= Trumpet Concerto (Leopold Mozart) =

Trumpet Concerto by Johann Georg Leopold Mozart

- by Leopold Mozart
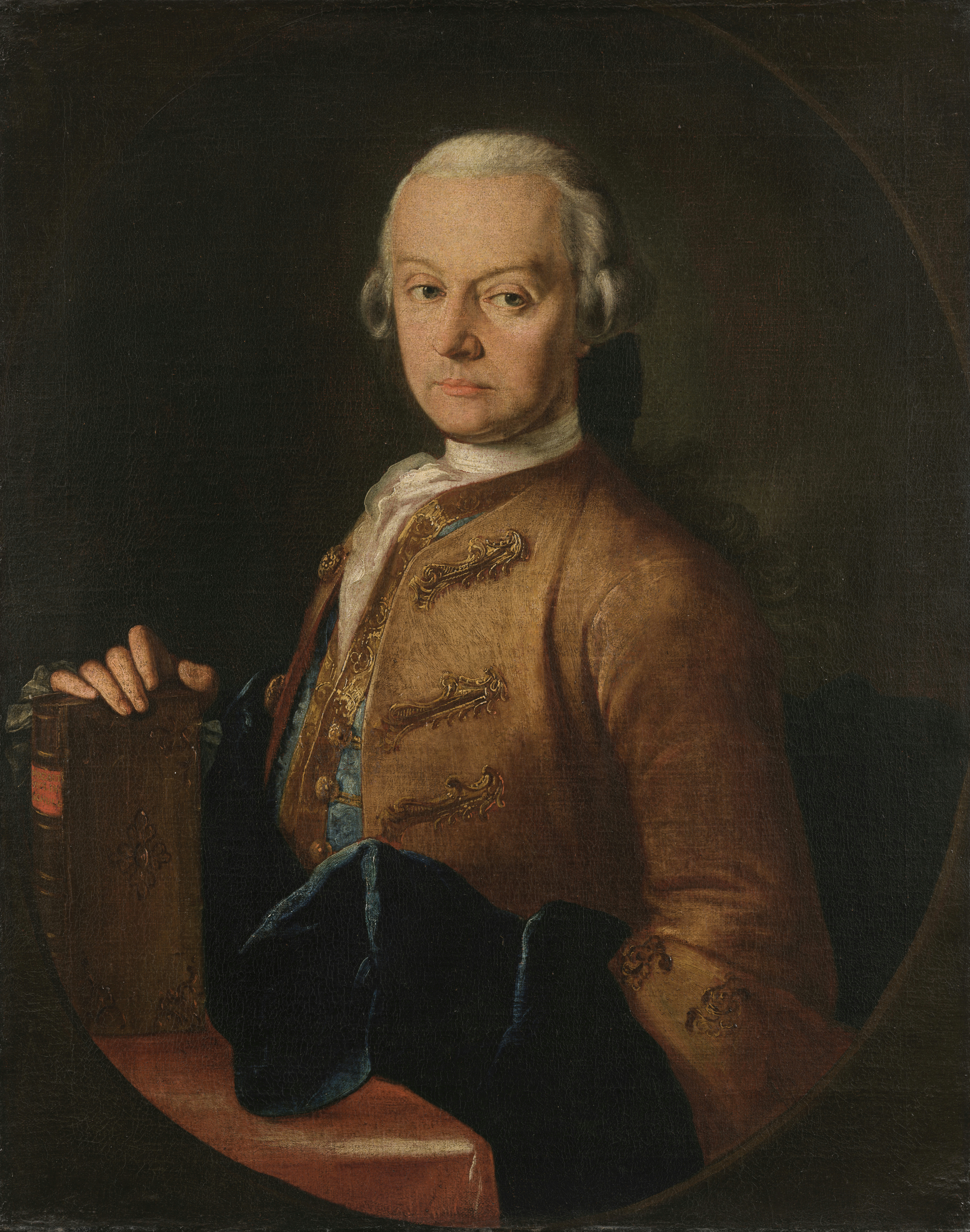
- Key: D Major
- Year: 1762
- Period: Classical
- Genre: Concerto
- Movements: 2
- Scoring: Trumpet, two horns and strings

Leopold Mozart's Trumpet Concerto in D major was completed in 1762, and is now "popular with trumpeters." The work is in two movements:

1. Largo
2. Allegro moderato

Besides the solo trumpet in D, the concerto is scored for two horns in D and strings. Only the first movement provides room for a cadenza; the Gábor Darvas edition published by Editio Musica gives an 8-measure cadenza which requires no ledger lines but consistently involves small note values. In fact, in regards to range, the concerto is "cautious."

== Discography ==
Nikolaus Harnoncourt with Vienna Concentus Musicus chooses this Trumpet Concerto to cap off a disc of music by the composer's son, which includes the Bassoon Concerto K. 191.

It can also be found on several CDs with trumpet concertos by other composers, such as:

- George Vosburgh's recording with the Seattle Symphony and Gerard Schwarz, which includes Joseph Haydn's Trumpet Concerto in E♭ major, Johann Nepomuk Hummel's Trumpet Concerto in E major and Georg Philipp Telemann's Trumpet Concerto in D major.
- The Naxos Records album The Art of the Baroque Trumpet, Volume 1, with Niklas Eklund, groups Mozart's Concerto with Baroque trumpet concertos such as the aforementioned Telemann, and adds Molter, Purcell, Fasch and Handel. Eklund wrote his own cadenza for the first movement.
- Miroslav Kejmar also includes it in his Famous Trumpet Concerti album, which besides Joseph Haydn's is all Baroque.
- On Telarc, Rolf Smedvig with the Scottish Chamber Orchestra conducted by Jahja Ling plays Mozart's Concerto as well as Telemann's and Bach's Brandenburg Concerto No. 2.
- Wynton Marsalis plays this concerto along with the famous concerti by Haydn and Hummel. This recording is part of the Great Performances series by Sony.
- Maurice André, with the Berliner Philharmoniker conducted by Herbert von Karajan on EMI 5 66909 2 (Great Recordings of the Century series), together with concertos by Hummel, Telemann, and Vivaldi.
- John Wilbraham, with the Academy of St. Martin-in-the-Fields conducted by Neville Marriner on Decca 417 761-2 (Ovation series), together with concertos by Haydn (played by Alan Stringer), Telemann, Albinoni and Hummel.
- Edward H Tarr, with the Consortium Musicum conducted by Fritz Lehan on a two-disc compendium entitled Trumpet Classics on EMI Seraphim 5 69140 2, together with music for trumpet by Haydn, Torelli, Viviani, Telemann, Franceschini, Hummel, Hertel, Handel, Albinoni and Vivaldi, with a variety of performers.
