= Trumpet Concerto (Michael Haydn) =

Trumpet Concerto by Michael Haydn

Trumpet Concerto in C major
- by Michael Haydn
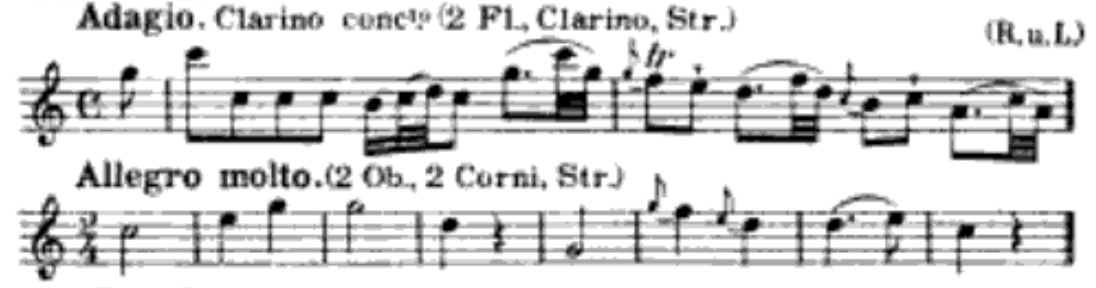
- Incipit of Michael Haydn's Clarino Concerto
- Catalogue: MH 60, Perger 34
- Genre: Concerto
- Composed: 1763
- Movements: 2
- Scoring: 2 flutes, strings, continuo, solo trumpet

Michael Haydn's Trumpet Concerto in C major (Clarino Concerto MH 60/Perger 34) was completed in 1763. It is known for its extremely high register. The piece is often listed as Trumpet Concerto No. 2. Its more famous predecessor, Trumpet Concerto No. 1 in D major, MH 104, is culled from a divertimento.

== Background ==
Michael Haydn arrived in Salzburg just prior to composing the concerto. The manuscript is at Göttweig Abbey. In the Perger-Verzeichnis, it is listed as Clarino Concerto. Until the 20th century, the piece was commonly known as Sinfonia. Edward Tarr gave it the name Trumpet Concerto No. 2 in order to distinguish it from Haydn's Trumpet Concerto No. 1 in D major (MH 104).

The music is derived from Haydn's Violin Concerto in G Major (MH 52). The solo trumpet line is a very close adaptation of the violin solo.

== Music ==
The work is in two movements:

1. Adagio
2. Allegro molto

Haydn's concerto "is one of the most difficult in the entire repertory." Besides the solo trumpet in C, the concerto is scored for two flutes, strings, and continuo. Part of the difficulty of the concerto is because of the very high notes for the trumpet, which is written even higher than the flutes (indeed, the solo trumpet part is much higher than would be advisable for the modern trumpet, while the flute parts are too low for modern flutes to be heard clearly against a full string section).

Both movements provide room for a cadenza; Edward H. Tarr's edition for Musica Rara writes out cadenzas in the trumpet part but not in the conductor's score. Tarr's cadenza for the second movement even goes up to a G above high C but provides ossia for the next lower G.

== Discography ==
- Armando Ghitalla. Armando Ghitalla, Volume II. Cambridge (CRS 2823). 1969.

Reissued in Trumpeter Emeritus. Chamber Orchestra of Copenhagen, John Moriarty. Crystal Records, 1996.

- John Wallace. Virtuoso Trumpet Concertos. Philharmonia Orchestra, Simon Wright. Nimbus Records, 1988.
- Niklas Eklund. The Art of Baroque Trumpet, Volume 4. Drottningholm Baroque Ensemble, Nils-Erik Sparf. Naxos, 1999.
- Crispian Steele-Perkins. Classical Trumpet Concertos. The King's Consort, Robert King. Hyperion Records, 2001.
- Reinhold Friedrich. Trumpet Recital. Academy of St Martin in the Fields, Neville Marriner. Capriccio, 2003.
- Otto Sauter. The Trumpet in Salzburg. Cappella Istropolitana, Nicol Matt. Brilliant Classics, 2006.
- Franz Landlinger. Michael Haydn: Complete Wind Concertos, Volume 2. Salzburger Hofmusik, Wolfgang Brunner. CPO, 2014.

Reissued in Michael Haydn Collection, Volume 2. Salzburger Hofmusik, Wolfgang Brunner. Brilliant Classics, 2019.

== See also ==
- Joseph Haydn, Trumpet Concerto
