= Tone hole =

Opening in the body of a wind instrument

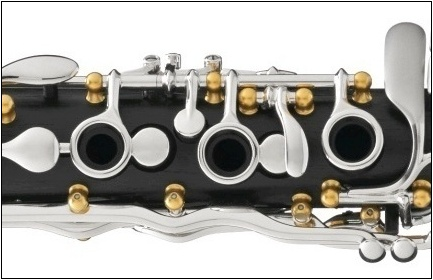
Some tone holes of a basset clarinet.

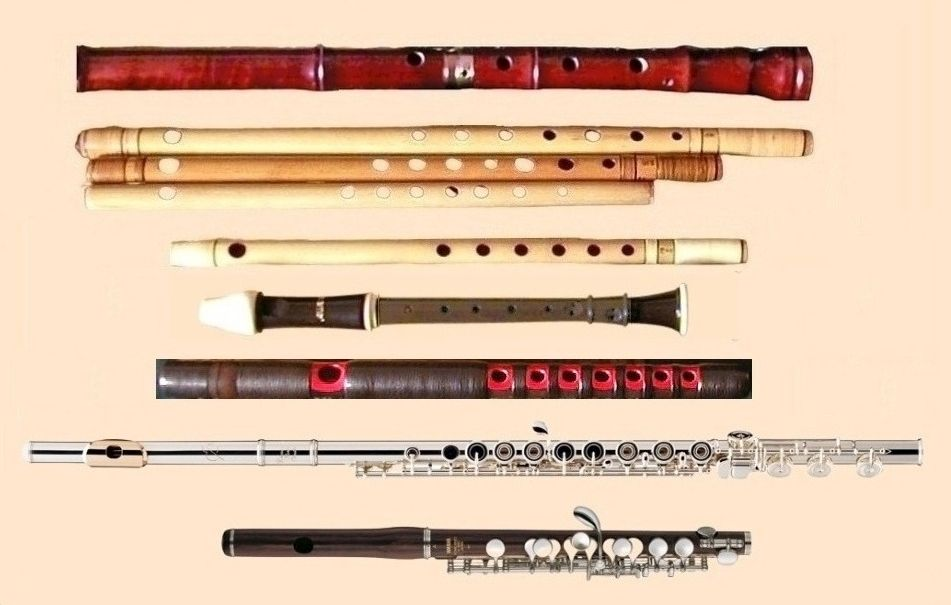
A selection of flutes from around the world

A tone hole is an opening in the body of a wind instrument which, when alternately closed and opened, changes the pitch of the sound produced. Tone holes may serve specific purposes, such as a trill hole or register hole. A tone hole is, "in wind instruments[,] a hole that may be stopped by the finger, or a key, to change the pitch of the tone produced."

The resonant frequencies of the air column in a pipe are inversely proportional to the pipe's effective length. In other words, a shorter pipe produces higher notes. For a pipe with no tone holes but open at both ends, the effective length is the physical length of the pipe plus a little more for the small volumes of air just beyond the ends of the pipe that are also involved in the resonance. An open hole anywhere along the middle of the pipe shortens the pipe's effective length and therefore raises the pitch of the notes it produces. The closer an open hole is to the blowing end, the shorter the remaining effective length is and the more it raises the pitch. Generally, a hole in a given position doesn't reduce the effective length quite as much as cutting the pipe at that position would, and the smaller the hole, the less it reduces the effective length when open. Closing the hole increases the effective length and lowers the pitch again. However, a pipe with a closed tone hole is not acoustically identical to a pipe with no hole; the shape of the fingertip or pad that closes the hole modifies the pipe's internal volume and effective length.

When there are multiple tone holes, the first (closest to the blowing end) open tone hole usually has the largest influence on the pipe's effective length. However, closing holes below the first open hole without closing the first hole can also lower the pitch significantly; such cross fingerings may often be useful. Generally, the pitch and timbre of the notes produced will depend on the positions, sizes, heights, and shapes of all the tone holes, both open and closed. Theoretical models allow these effects to be calculated with some accuracy, but the design of tone holes remains to some degree a matter of trial and error.

Most woodwind instruments rely on tone holes to produce different pitches. Two common exceptions are the slide whistle and the overtone flutes. Most brass instruments use valves or a slide instead of tone holes, with the cornett, the ophicleide, the keyed trumpet, and the rare keyed bugle as exceptions. The modern reproduction of the natural trumpet, called the baroque trumpet, are fitted with tone holes (called vent holes) to correct the out of tune notes (written) B♭_{4,} F_{5,} A_{5,} and B♭_{5}.

== See also ==
- Saxophone tone hole
- Organ pipe
