= Trumpet Concerto (Haydn) =

Trumpet concerto composed by Joseph Haydn

- by Joseph Haydn
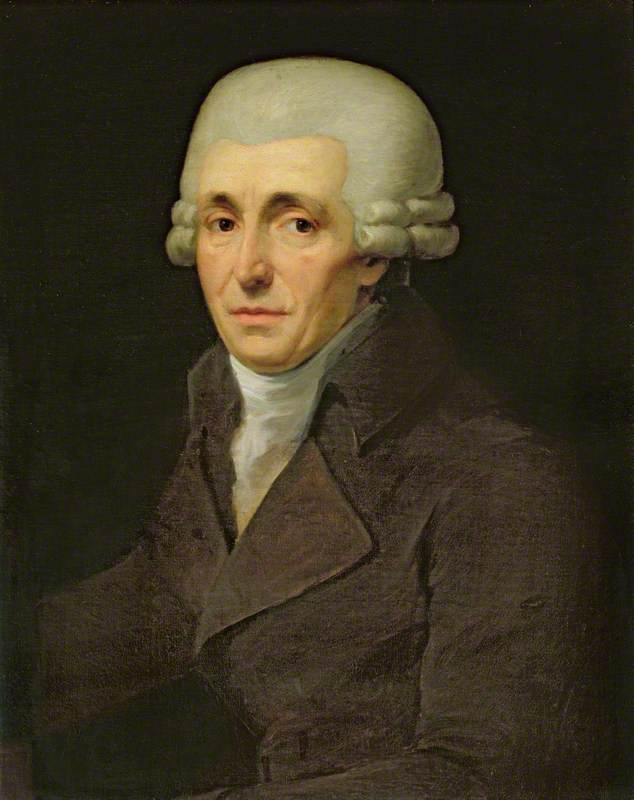
- Portrait of Haydn by Johann Carl Rößler, c. 1799
- Key: E♭ major
- Catalogue: Hob. Vlle/1
- Composed: 1796
- Performed: March 28, 1800; 226 years ago Burgtheater, Vienna
- Movements: three

Joseph Haydn composed the Concerto per il Clarino (Hob. VIIe/1) (Trumpet Concerto in E♭ major) in 1796 for the trumpet virtuoso Anton Weidinger. Joseph Haydn was 64 years of age. A favourite of the trumpet repertoire, it has been cited as "possibly Haydn's most popular concerto". Although written in 1796, Weidinger first performed the concerto four years later on March 28, 1800.

== Original instrument ==
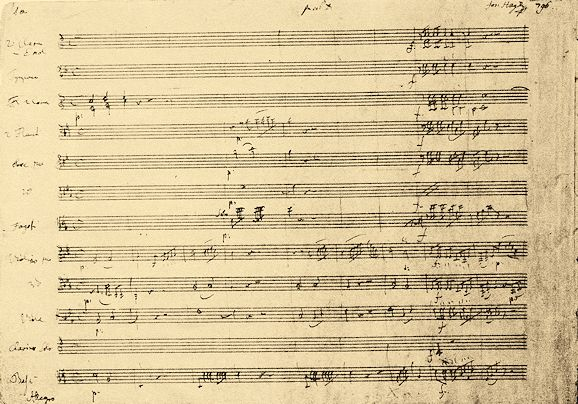
First page of the autograph of the concerto

Anton Weidinger developed a keyed trumpet which could play chromatically throughout its entire range. Before this, the trumpet was valveless and could only play a limited range of harmonic notes by altering the vibration of the lips; also called by the name of "natural trumpet". Most of these harmonic notes were clustered in the higher registers, so previous trumpet concertos could only play melodically with the high register (e.g., Bach's Brandenburg Concerto No. 2). Haydn's concerto includes melodies in the middle and lower register, exploiting the capabilities of the new instrument. Haydn, fascinated by the invention, was inspired to write the concerto. He enjoyed experimenting with the instrument and its newly chromatic capabilities in all registers of the instrument. The concerto itself features a variety of chromatic shifts, achievable with the manipulation of the keys, to display Weidinger’s technical brilliance on the instrument.

There were attempts all over Europe around the mid-classical era to expand the range of the trumpet using valves, but Weidinger's idea of drilling holes and covering them with flute-like keys was not a success as it had very poor sound quality. Thus the natural trumpet still had continual use in the classical orchestra while the keyed trumpet had barely any repertoire. The valved trumpets used today were first constructed and used in the 1830s.

== Form ==
I. Allegro

II. Andante

III. Allegro
Performed by the Real Filharmonía de Galicia

Typical of a Classical period concerto, the work is in three movements:

1. Allegro (sonata)
2. Andante (A–B–A)
3. Allegro (rondo)

In addition to the solo trumpet, the concerto is scored for an orchestra consisting of two flutes, two oboes, two bassoons, two horns, two trumpets, timpani, and strings.

== In popular culture ==
In Hong Kong, this piece has been adopted as the theme of the sketch comedy Shanghai Woman (played by Lydia Shum) in TVB's variety show Enjoy Yourself Tonight. This piece has also been adopted in one of the songs of Wan Kwong.

The concerto's third movement was also used in the popular Netflix TV Series Squid Game and the Roblox game Grow a Garden.

== See also ==
- Michael Haydn also wrote a trumpet concerto, with the same two-movement form as Leopold Mozart's Trumpet Concerto.
- Johann Nepomuk Hummel also wrote a trumpet concerto for Anton Weidinger.
