= Pitch of brass instruments =

Lowest playable resonance frequency of the open instrument

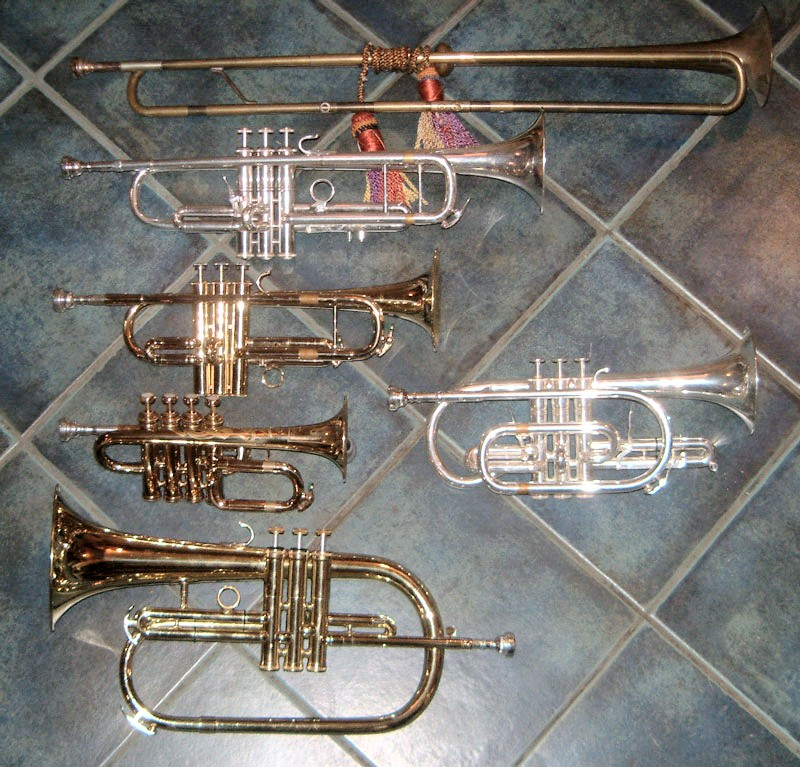
High brass - from the top left: Baroque trumpet in D, modern trumpets in B♭ and D (same pitch D as Baroque), piccolo trumpet in high B♭, Flugelhorn in B♭; right: cornet in B♭.

The pitch of a brass instrument corresponds to the lowest playable resonance frequency of the open instrument. The combined resonances resemble a harmonic series. The fundamental frequency of the harmonic series can be varied by adjusting the length of the tubing using the instrument's valve, slide, key or crook system, while the player's embouchure, lip tension and air flow serve to select a specific harmonic from the available series for playing. The fundamental is essentially missing from the resonances and is impractical to play on most brass instruments, but the overtones account for most pitches.

The following table provides the pitch of the second harmonic (the lowest playable resonance on most brass instruments, an octave above the fundamental frequency) and length for some common brass instruments in descending order of pitch. This pitch is notated transpositionally as middle C for many of these brass instruments.

| Pitch | Length | Examples |
|---|---|---|
| B♭_{4} or A_{4} | 2.25, 2.12 ft (69, 65 cm) | piccolo trumpet |
| E♭_{4} | 3.125 ft (95.3 cm) | soprano cornet, soprano trumpet |
| B♭_{3} | 4.5 ft (1.4 m) | trumpet, cornet, flugelhorn, soprano trombone |
| F_{3} | 6 ft (1.8 m) | F mellophone |
| E♭_{3} | 6.75 ft (2.06 m) | alto horn, alto trombone, alto trumpet |
| B♭_{2} | 9 ft (2.7 m) | tenor and bass trombone, baritone horn, euphonium, B♭ horn, bass trumpet, natural trumpet, B♭ mellophone |
| F_{2} | 12 ft (3.7 m) | French horn, contrabass trombone, cimbasso |
| E♭_{2} or F_{2} | 13.5, 12 ft (4.1, 3.7 m) | bass tuba |
| B♭_{1} or C_{2} | 18, 16 ft (5.5, 4.9 m) | contrabass tuba, contrabass trombone |

== Range ==
The normal playing range of most three-valved brass instruments extends from three whole tones below the 2nd harmonic of the instrument to the 10th harmonic. Skilled players can produce tones outside this range. For many transposing brass instruments, this range is written as extending from F♯ below middle C to E two octaves and a third above middle C.

The orchestral horn is an exception as it was classically assigned a range beginning at its fourth harmonic.

=== Whole tube vs half tube ===
The ease with which a player produces the fundamental note of each harmonic series for each tubing length of a modern brass instrument varies with the instrument's design. As bore width increases relative to length, it becomes easier for the player to resist the instrument's tendency to jump to the second harmonic instead of producing the fundamental frequency. Brass instruments with sufficient bore to play fundamentals with relative ease and accuracy are called "whole-tube" instruments, while instruments that are limited to the second harmonic as a lowest note in practical use are called "half-tube" instruments. These terms stem from a comparison to organ pipes, which produce the same pitch as the pedal tone (fundamental) of a brass instrument of equal length.

Certain low brass instruments such as trombone, tuba, euphonium, and alto horn are whole-tube and can play the fundamental tone of each harmonic series with relative ease. Furthermore, the low brass often use extra valves to extend their range uniformly, since the fundamental is chromatically discontinuous with the lowest 2nd harmonic reachable on a three-valve instrument or via the seven-position slide on a trombone. Trombone and tuba in particular are often called upon to play pedal tones and "false tones" or "privileged tones" which have a pitch between the normal range and the fundamental.

=== Horn ===
The modern standard orchestral horn is a double B♭/F horn. The player can switch between the two modes using a thumb-operated fourth valve. The fundamental pitch of the F horn is near that of the tuba. Horn notation is a complex subject beyond the scope of this article, but what is written as middle C for the horn is the fourth harmonic of the unlengthened instrument, not the second. Horn music makes greater use of the higher range of the harmonic series than do most other modern brass instruments.

=== Bass trombone ===
The modern bass trombone is the same length as a tenor trombone, but typically has two valves, pitched in F and G♭. When combined, these valves put the instrument into D. The modern contrabass trombone is usually constructed in F and fitted with two valves in either D and B♭ combining to give A♭, or in C and D♭ combining to give A. The less common double slide contrabass in low B♭ is often fitted with a valve in F. All these instruments are notated in bass clef at concert pitch.

=== Tuba ===
The bass tuba is commonly available in F and E♭, while contrabass tubas are available in C and B♭.

In most of the rest of Europe, the bass tuba in F is considered the standard orchestral instrument.
