= Keyed bugle =

19th-century keyed brass instrument

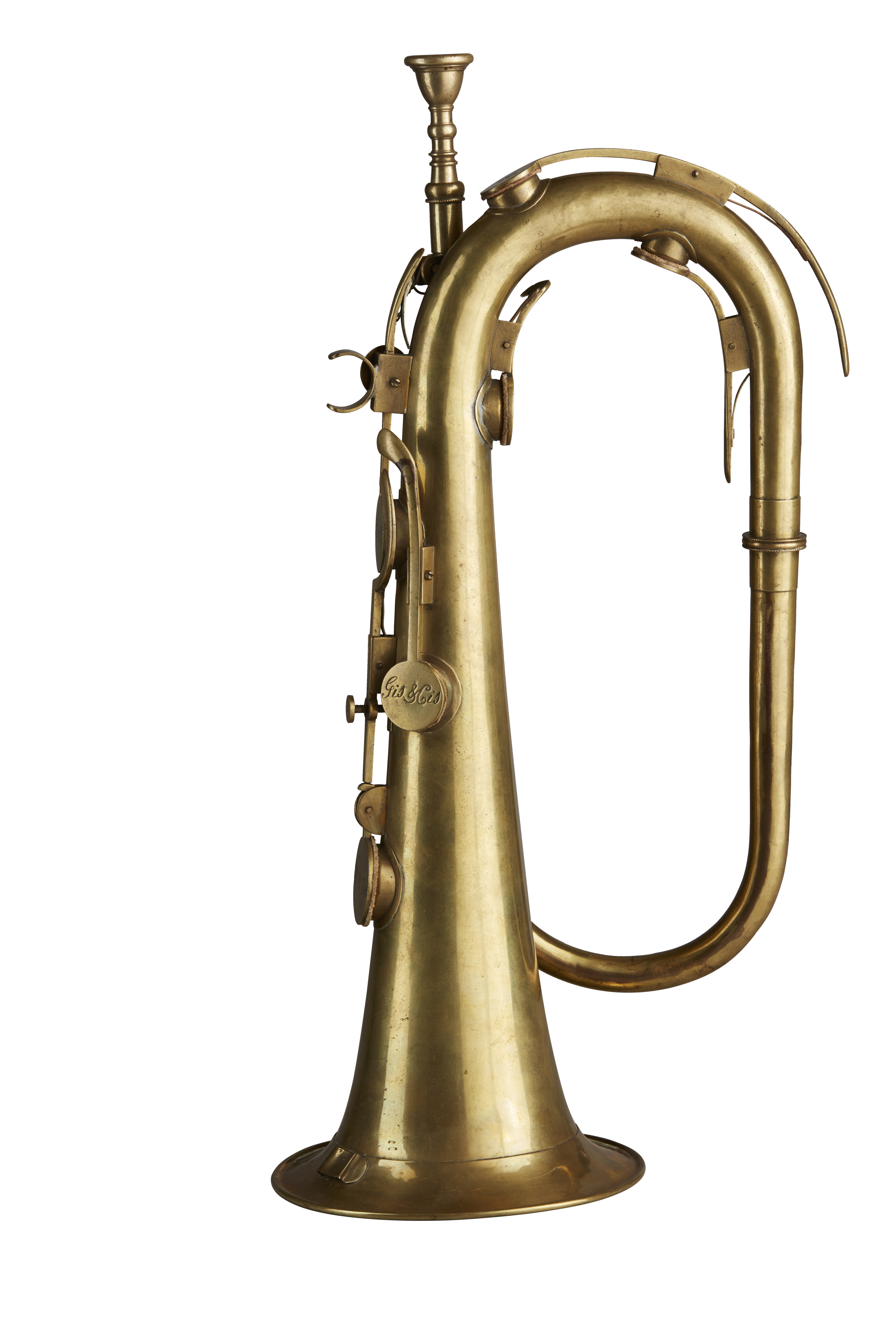
- Keyed bugle, c. 1830

Brass instrument
- Other names: Royal Kent bugle; Kent bugle; French: bugle à clefs; German: Klappenhorn, Klappenflügelhorn; Italian: cornetta a chiavi
- Classification: Aerophone; Brass instrument
- Hornbostel–Sachs classification: 423.21 (lip-reed aerophone with keys)
- Developed: 19th century

Playing range
- Range of the keyed bugle in C

Related instruments
- Bugle; Keyed trumpet; Flugelhorn; Cornet; Ophicleide

Keyed bugle made c. 1835

The keyed bugle (also Royal Kent bugle, or Kent bugle) is a high-pitched brass instrument with a wide conical bore and tone holes operated by keys to alter the pitch and provide a full chromatic scale. It was developed from the bugle around the year 1800 and was popular in military bands in Europe and the United States in the early 19th century, and in Britain as late as the 1850s. It was superseded by the flugelhorn and cornet after the invention of valves.

== History ==
The first known mention of a bugle with keys appears on 4 April 1800 in London's Morning Chronicle newspaper, in an advertisement for an instrument built by the London instrument maker George Astor. However, not until 5 May 1810 was a patent on a five-keyed bugle granted to Joseph Haliday of Yorkshire, entitled "Halliday's [sic] Improvements in the Musical Instrument called the Bugle Horn." Shortly thereafter, in 1811 the first known solos on the instrument were performed by trumpeter Henry Willman, brother of the clarinetist Thomas Lindsay Willman. Performances at the Theatre Royal, Dublin were announced with "Mr. H. Willman will play a Concerto on that highly-improved Instrument, The Patent Kent Bugle Horn, (Invented by Mr. Joseph Halliday)". The first book on the instrument, which by then had six keys to enable more tones, was Introduction to the Art of Playing on the Royal Kent Bugle by Johann Bernhard Logier in 1813.

While the 1911 Encyclopædia Britannica claims that Haliday called it the "Royal Kent Bugle" as a compliment to the Duke of Kent, who was at the time commander-in-chief, and encouraged the introduction of the instrument into the regimental bands, this appears to be at least partly erroneous. The duke was never commander-in-chief of any bands in Europe, and the dedication might have been made by Holden. A Royal Kent bugle in the key of C, stamped with Halliday’s name as inventor, and made by Turton of Dublin, was exhibited at the Royal Military Exhibition in 1890.

== Pitch ==
The instrument has a tessitura range of around two octaves, not including the fundamental tones. The notes of the harmonic series with no keys down are:

Notes from the harmonic series available open (no keys)

To the original instrument specified in the patent, Halliday added a sixth key, which became the first and was in the normal position open; this key when closed gave B♭, with the same series of harmonics as the open tube. The series, however, becomes shorter with each successive key:

Notes from the harmonic series available on the second through sixth keys

The bore of the instrument is just wide enough in proportion to its length to make possible the playing of the fundamental tones in the first two series, but these notes were never used, and the harmonics above the sixth were also avoided due to poor intonation.

The keyed bugle was chiefly used in B♭, usually by adding a small B♭ crook to the leadpipe of the bugle in C.

== Bibliography ==
- Dudgeon, Ralph T. (2004), The Keyed Bugle, OL 8481503W, Wikidata Q116224505
- Herbert, Trevor; Myers, Arnold; Wallace, John, eds. (2019). The Cambridge Encyclopedia of Brass Instruments. Cambridge University Press. doi:10.1017/9781316841273. ISBN 978-1-316-63185-0. OL 34730943M. Wikidata Q136027509.
- Herbert, Trevor; Wallace, John, eds. (1997). The Cambridge Companion to Brass Instruments. Cambridge Companions. Cambridge University Press. doi:10.1017/ccol9780521563437. ISBN 978-1-139-00203-5. OCLC 460517551. OL 34482695M. Wikidata Q112852613.
- Lasocki, David (2009). "New Light on the Early History of the Keyed Bugle Part I: The Astor Advertisement and Collins v. Green". Historic Brass Society Journal. 21: 10–55.
