= Keyed trumpet =

Early Classical era trumpet with keys

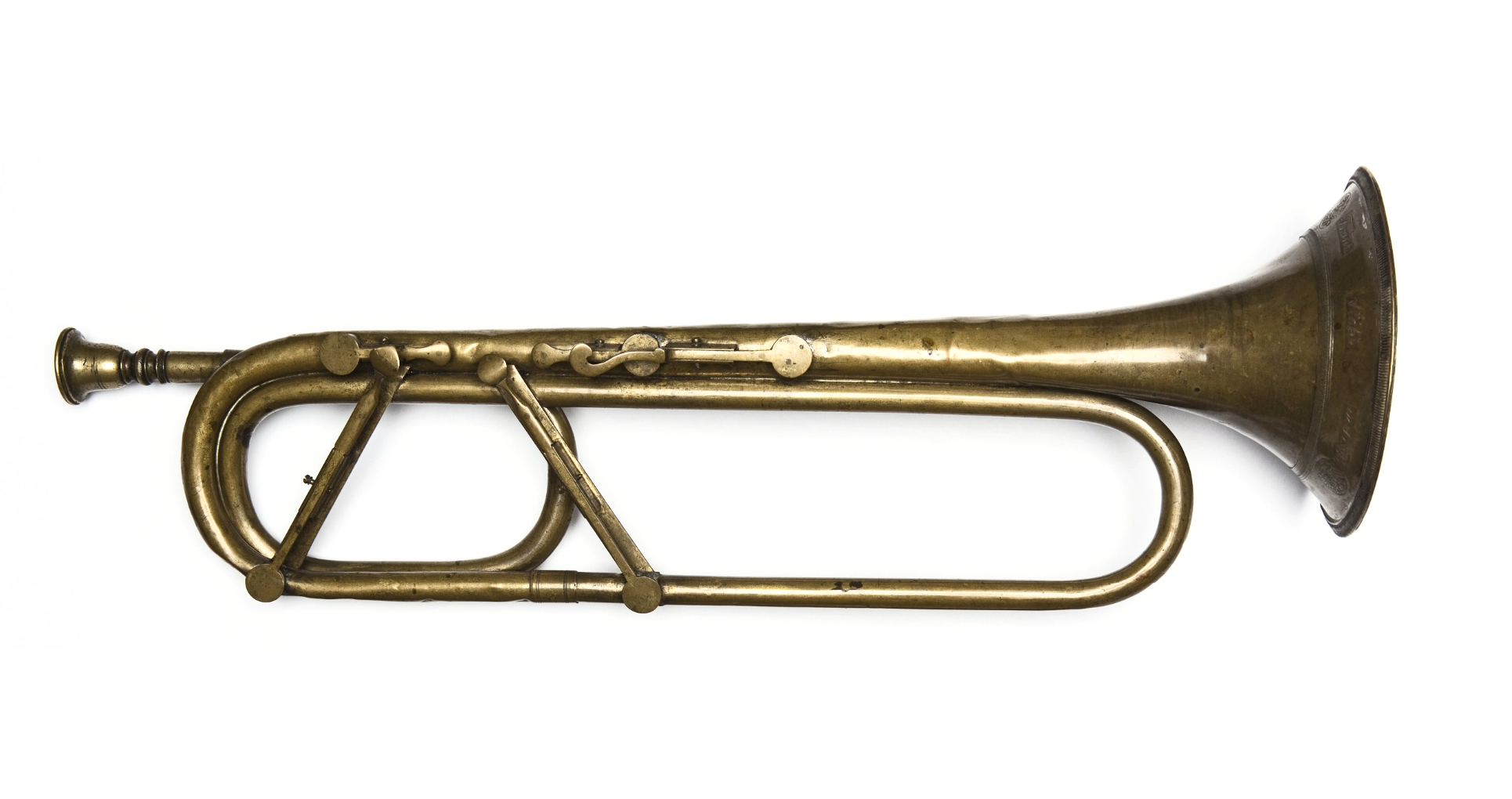
- Keyed trumpet in G by Franz Stöhr, c. 1830. St Cecilia's Hall, Edinburgh

Brass instrument
- Other names: French: trompette à clefs; German: Klappentrompete; Italian: tromba a chiavi
- Classification: brass
- Hornbostel–Sachs classification: 423.211 (chromatic labrosone with keys and cylindrical bore)
- Developed: Late 18th century

Related instruments
- keyed bugle; natural trumpet; trumpet

Musicians
- Barry Bauguess; Mark Bennett; Crispian Steele-Perkins; Anton Weidinger; Markus Wuersch

Builders
- Historical: Alois Doke; Josef Riedl; Franz Stöhr; Modern replicas: Blaswerkstatt Burri; David Edwards; Egger

The keyed trumpet is a cylindrical-bore brass instrument in the trumpet family, developed from the natural trumpet in the late 18th century. It makes use of tone holes, operated by keys, to alter pitch and provide a full chromatic scale, rather than extending the length of tubing with a slide or valves. It reached its high-point in popularity c. 1800 when two important trumpet concertos were written for it by Austrian composers Joseph Haydn and Johann Nepomuk Hummel. The conical bore of its more successful sibling, the keyed bugle, was more accommodating of the acoustic compromises caused by tone holes, and the keyed trumpet was quickly supplanted by instruments that were developed after the invention of valves in the 1820s, such as the cornet à pistons and eventually the modern valved trumpet. It is rarely seen in modern performances.

== History ==
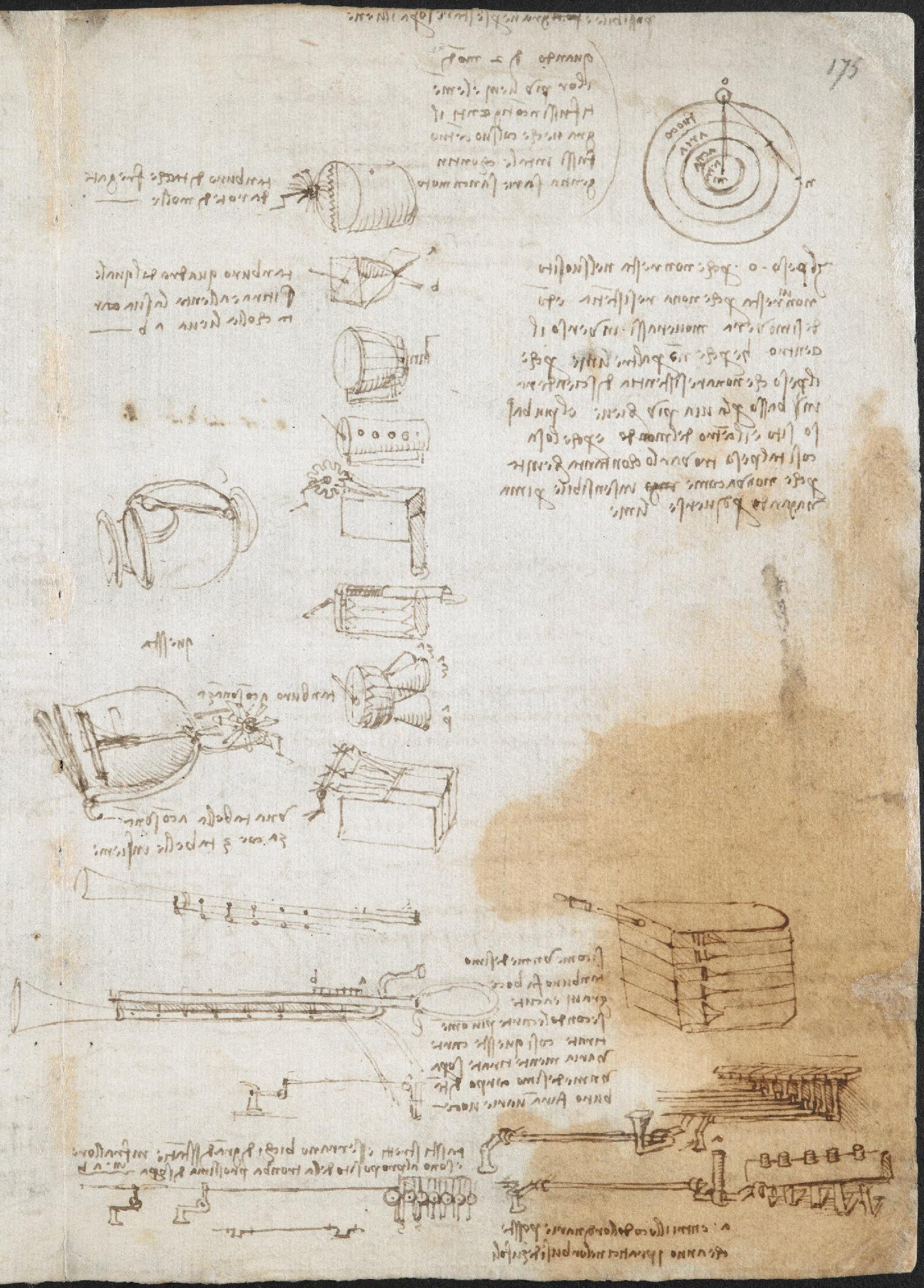
Leonardo da Vinci's diagrams of a trumpet with tone holes and keys (lower left), c. 1480–1518

The idea of applying keys to the natural trumpet, in order to extend its available notes beyond the harmonic series, was first documented by Leonardo da Vinci as a series of annotated diagrams in his notebooks written c. 1480–1518. Da Vinci describes a mechanism using a wire or thin rod to link finger-operated buttons to remote keys or pads, allowing tone holes to be in their acoustically correct positions without having to be covered directly by the fingertips. Like many of his ideas, it was not realised for centuries.

The invention of the keyed trumpet is often attributed to Viennese court trumpeter Anton Weidinger, its most successful and earliest proponent, who was certainly involved in its early development and built one of the first prototypes. However further research has revealed many conflicting records, accounts, and details of surviving instruments that attest to its simultaneous independent invention in several places within a short period, such that the very first inventor may never be known with certainty. The lack of surviving instruments from this early period further obscures its history.

The very first designs of keyed trumpet were intended to correct the intonation of the notes in the harmonic series, rather than to extend its capabilities to a full chromatic scale. The harmonic trumpet, a silver trumpet in E♭ with crooks for D, C, and B♭ and four keys, was made by London instrument maker William Shaw for King George III in 1787. British musician and musicologist Eric Halfpenny found that each key corresponds to one of the four crooks and raises the pitch by a fifth, providing a fuller range of notes by allowing the player to switch between two harmonic series as required. This instrument not only predates Weidinger's instrument, but may have been known to Austrian composer Joseph Haydn, who was making extended visits to London at the time. He composed his trumpet concerto in 1796, the year after his last visit, and early music trumpet specialist Crispian Steele-Perkins postulates that this instrument, via Haydn, may have inspired the further development of keyed trumpets in Vienna by Weidinger and others.

The keyed trumpet's popularity peaked in the first decades of the 19th century, sustained by Weidinger and subsequent players throughout Europe. It unlocked the chromatic scale for trumpet players, increasing the versatility of the instrument and allowing its use in the orchestra as a featured, rather than background, instrument. Its popularity was relatively short-lived, remaining in frequent use until only the 1830s and 1840s, by which time the valved cornet à pistons was replacing it.

== Construction ==
The keyed trumpet is based on the natural trumpet, which can only play the notes in the harmonic series using the embouchure. Melodies could only be played in the high register of the instrument where the harmonic notes were clustered closer together. The keyed trumpet allows more than one harmonic series to be used, by shortening the effective length of the tubing using raised tone holes operated by keys, similar in construction to the later ophicleide or saxophone. As on many woodwind instruments, the tone holes are covered with a padded circular closure and opened with a finger-operated key, via a rod and lever mechanism. Most instruments had five keys, and several crooks to shift the base pitch. The experimental E♭ keyed trumpet was chromatic in all registers of the instrument.

== Repertoire ==
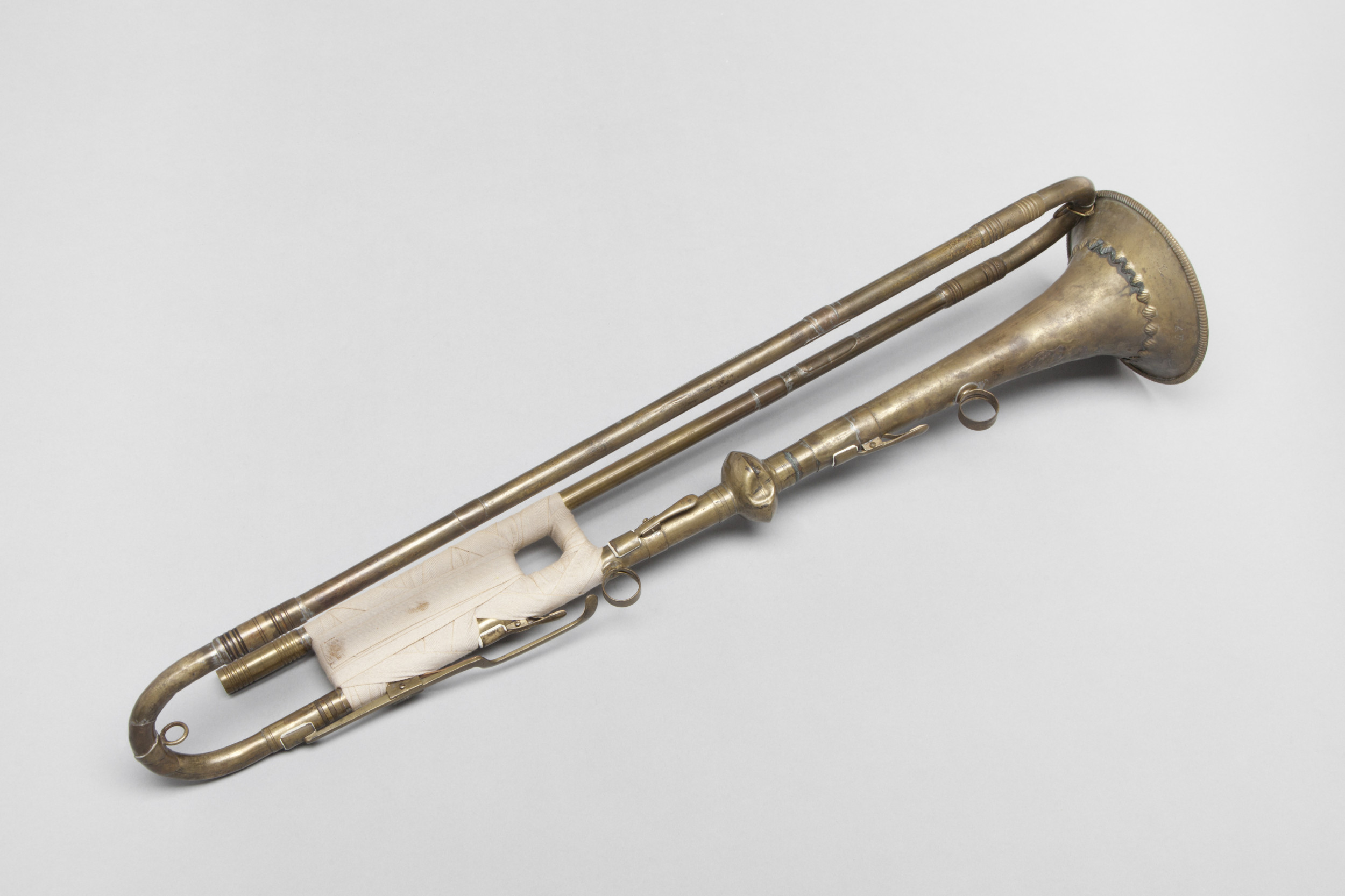
Keyed trumpet by I. Bauer, Prague, 1817

In 1796, Austrian composer Joseph Haydn wrote his Trumpet Concerto for Vienna court musician Anton Weidinger, who performed its première on 22 March 1800 at the Imperial and Royal Court Theatre. The piece begins with the arpeggios and fanfare motifs common to trumpet music of the time, but introduces diatonic melodies and chromatic runs not possible on the natural trumpet. This allows the concerto to be the first trumpet solo written in sonata-allegro form. The highest note in the concerto is high concert D♭, or high E♭ on a B♭ trumpet, or a high B♭ on E♭ trumpet for which it was written.

Like Haydn, Austrian composer Johann Nepomuk Hummel wrote his Trumpet Concerto for Anton Weidinger. It was written and performed in 1803 to mark his entrance into the Esterházy court orchestra in 1804, following Haydn. There are places, primarily in the second movement, where Weidinger is believed to have changed the music because of the execution of the instrument; it is unknown whether this was in agreement with Hummel.

=== Other works ===
The following are pieces originally written for keyed trumpet:

- Leopold Kozeluch - Concertante in E flat major for mandolin, keyed trumpet, double bass, pianoforte and orchestra - 1798
- Joseph Weigl - Concerto in E flat for Corno Inglese, Flauto d’amore, Tromba, Viola d’amore, Cembalo and Violoncello - 1799
- Johann Nepomuk Hummel - Trio for pianoforte, violin and trumpet. (possibly the influence for Rondo from Hummel's trumpet concerto) - 1802
- Antonio Casimir Cartellieri - Polonaise in A - 1815
- Sigismund Neukomm - Requiem (with keyed trumpet interludes) - 1815

== Performance ==
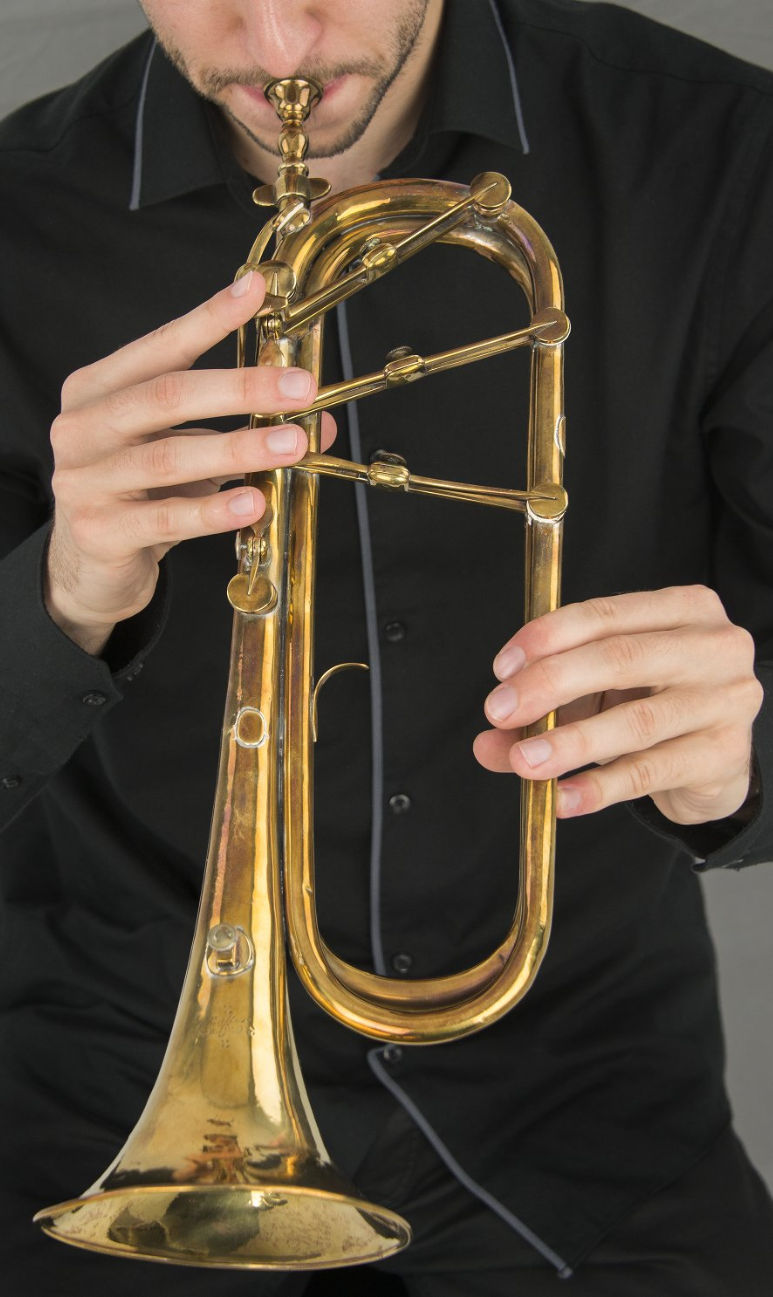
Keyed trumpet in E♭ by Louis Müller, Lyon c. 1835

Due to its physical characteristics—cylindrical bore, bell shape, and historical mouthpiece—the keyed trumpet is closer in tone to the natural trumpet than the valved trumpet. Nevertheless, the combination of wide-flared bell and cylindrical bore introduces inherent acoustical problems when using tone holes, especially when compared with its conical-bore equivalent, the keyed bugle. It was once said to have sounded like a "Demented Oboe ... despite Haydn's efforts, the keyed trumpet had no real success ... the explanation may be that the holes detracted from the brilliant tone of the instrument." The keyed trumpet has a different, weaker tone on open-keyed notes, due to the inability of the bell to support the harmonics produced when shortening the cylindrical air column. This inferior tone quality is ultimately what allowed the keyed trumpet to be surpassed by the valved trumpet.

There are few people that play the keyed trumpet today, and it is generally used only in historically informed performances. Modern experts on the keyed trumpet include Markus Wuersch, Crispian Steele-Perkins, Mark Bennett and Barry Bauguess. Given that there are few people who can play this specialized instrument, performances are rare and almost exclusively performances of the Haydn or Hummel concertos. The argument for using keyed trumpets in the modern day is that you get the distinct tone qualities of the instrument. Keyed trumpets have a rich, overtone filled sound due to them being double the length of the modern trumpet. Today, orchestral music is seeing a push to return to period instruments in order to preserve the compositions in the way the composer intended. This push is what has caused instrument makers like Konrad Burri to revisit and produce period instruments like the keyed trumpet in the modern day.

=== Recordings ===
Although performances using the keyed trumpet are rare, there are a few recordings that can be listened to:

- Mark Bennett, Haydn Trumpet Concerto with The English Concert (1990)
- Markus Würsch, Hummel Trumpet Concerto (2016)

== See also ==
- Natural trumpet
- Brass instrument valves
- Trumpet

== Bibliography ==
- Geiringer, Karl; Geiringer, Irene (1982). Haydn: A creative life in music. Berkeley: University of California Press. ISBN 0-520-04316-2. Wikidata Q134891954.
- Klaus, Sabine Katharina (2013). Ways to Expand the Harmonic Series. Trumpets and Other High Brass. Vol. 2. Vermillion: National Music Museum. ISBN 978-0-9848269-2-6. Wikidata Q116447957.
- Warburton, Annie O. (1980). Analyses of Musical Classics. Vol. 2. ISBN 978-0-582-32484-8. OCLC 930237837. OL 6797765W. Wikidata Q126900650.
