= Carl Hummel =

German painter

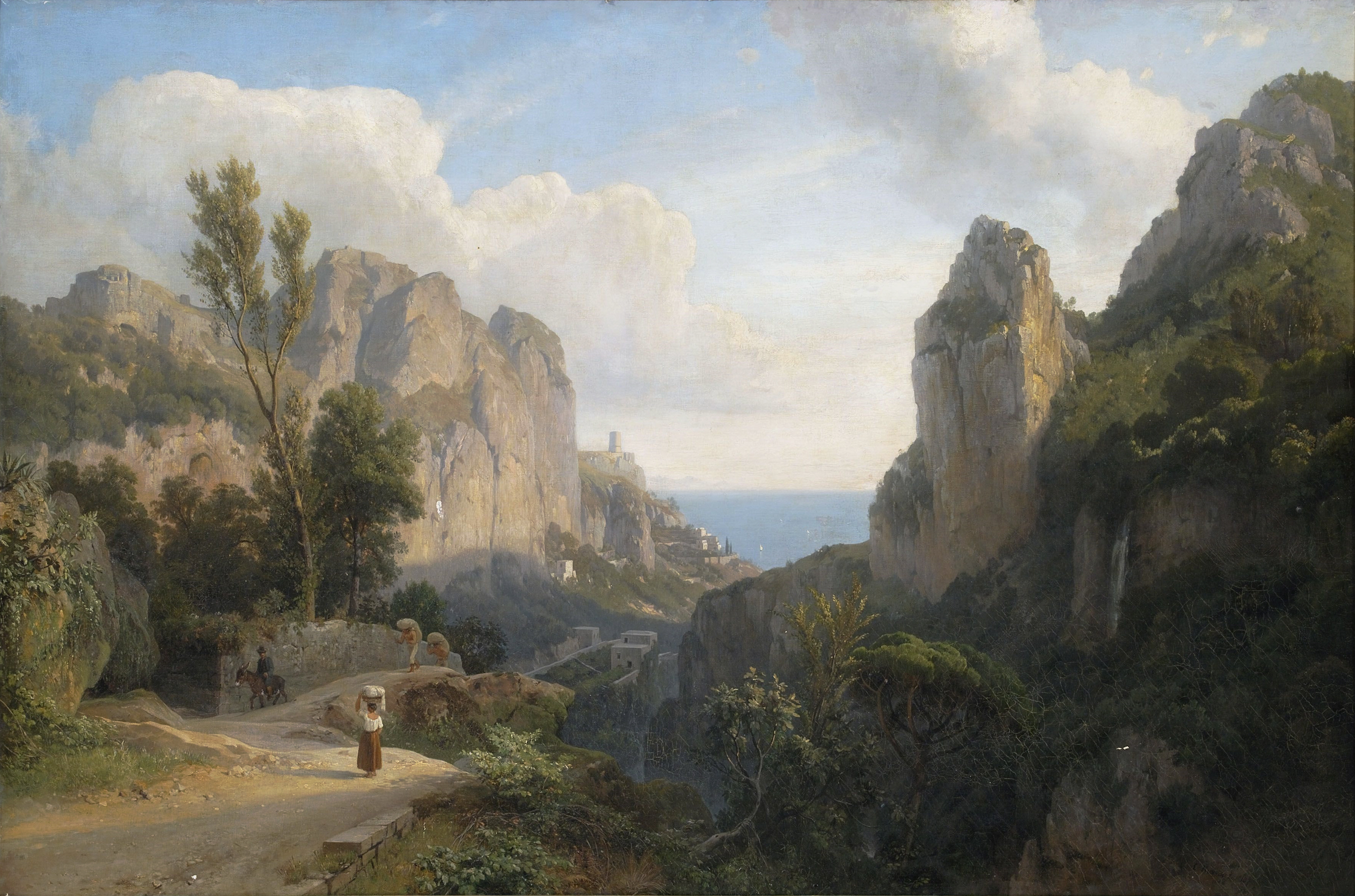
Valley of the Mills, near Amalfi (1878)

Carl Maria Nicolaus Hummel (31 August 1821, Weimar – 16 June 1907, Weimar) was a German landscape painter and etcher.

== Life and work ==
He was the son of Austrian composer Johann Nepomuk Hummel and the opera singer Elisabeth Röckel. His studies began in 1841 under Friedrich Preller at the Fürstliche freie Zeichenschule Weimar. After graduating, he made several study trips to England, Norway, Rügen and the Tyrol, lingering in Italy and Sicily until 1846.

Upon his return, he settled in Weimar, where he became a professor at the Weimar Saxon-Grand Ducal Art School in 1860. His paintings focus primarily on the Italian and Tyrolean Alps. They are widely displayed at museums throughout Northern Europe, including the Musée de la Vie Romantique in Paris.

== Sources ==
- "Carl Hummel", in Thieme-Becker, Allgemeines Lexikon der Bildenden Künstler von der Antike bis zur Gegenwart. Vol. 18, E. A. Seemann, Leipzig 1925, p. 127.
- Paul Schmaling: Künstlerlexikon Hessen-Kassel 1777–2000. Mit den Malerkolonien Willingshausen und Kleinsassen. Jenior, Kassel 2001, ISBN 3-934377-96-3.
