= Anton Weidinger =

Anton Weidinger (June 9, 1766, in Vienna – September 20, 1852, in Vienna) was an Austrian trumpet virtuoso in the classical era, and a "k. k. Hof-Trompeter" (Imperial and Royal Court trumpeter). He was friends with Haydn, Mozart, Beethoven and Hummel.

Basing his ideas on earlier designs, in 1792, Weidinger experimented with a 7-keyed trumpet, a version of the instrument on which a full chromatic scale became possible, albeit with alleged loss of the instrument's usual power. It remained fashionable until well into the 19th century, when it was superseded by the valve trumpet.

In 1799 Weidinger became a member of the Imperial and Royal Court Trumpeter Corps.

In 1796 Joseph Haydn composed his Concerto in E Flat Major for Trumpet and Orchestra for Weidinger, the first piece by Haydn developed for a trumpet solo. The first performance took place in Vienna at the Old Burgtheater (now demolished) on 28 March 1800. Johann Nepomuk Hummel, who was Haydn's successor as Kapellmeister to the Esterházy family, also composed a Trumpet Concerto for Weidinger; this was originally written in the key of E major, but it is often played in the key of E flat major. Hummel also wrote a Trio for trumpet, piano and violin for Weidinger; this is now lost. Other composers known to have written for Weidinger include Leopold Kozeluh and Joseph Weigl (1766–1846).
