= Reinhold Friedrich =

German musician

Reinhold Friedrich (born 14 July 1958) is a German trumpeter and university lecturer in Karlsruhe.

== Career ==
Born in Weingarten, Friedrich was from 1983 to 1999 Solo trumpeter at the Radio-Sinfonie-Orchester Frankfurt. In 1986 he was awarded a prize at the ARD International Music Competition in Munich. Since 1989 he has been professor for trumpet at the Hochschule für Musik Karlsruhe. As a peculiarity, Friedrich masters the playing on the keyed trumpet of which he presented various recordings. Friedrich also cultivates the playing of historical baroque trumpet and teaches trumpet playing in the sense of the historically informed performance.
