= Trumpet Concerto (Hummel) =

1804 musical work

- by Johann Nepomuk Hummel
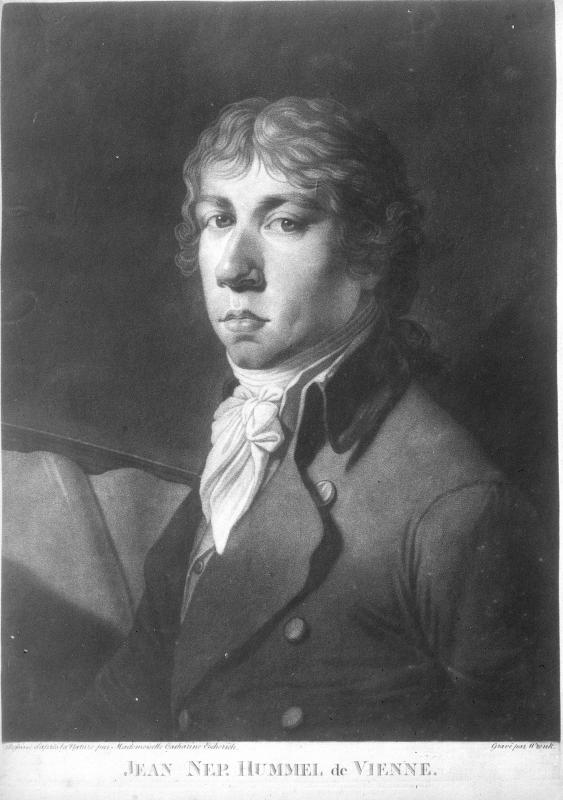
- Key: E major (often E♭ major)
- Composed: December 1803
- Performed: January 1, 1804; 222 years ago Eszterháza, Fertőd

Johann Nepomuk Hummel completed his Concerto a Trombe Principale (Trumpet Concerto in E Major) in December 1803. It was performed on New Year's Day 1804 to mark Hummel's entrance into the court orchestra of Nikolaus II, Prince Esterházy as Haydn's successor.

The work was composed for Viennese trumpet virtuoso and proponent of the keyed trumpet, Anton Weidinger. There are parts which Weidinger may have altered to make it easier to perform on the keyed trumpet.

Originally this piece was written in E major, but today is often performed in E♭ major. This makes the fingering less difficult on modern valve trumpets. A typical performance lasts around 17 minutes.

== Music ==
The work is scored for keyed trumpet solo, flute, two oboes, two clarinets, two horns, timpani, and strings.

The work is composed in three movements (typical of a concerto) and they are marked as follows:

1. Allegro con spirito
2. Andante
3. Rondo

== See also ==
- Joseph Haydn also wrote a trumpet concerto for Anton Weidinger.
