= Anna Freeman =

Australian trumpet player and teacher

Anna Freeman (born 1954) is a trumpet player and Professor of Trumpet and Brass Chamber Music at Hochschule für Musik und Tanz Köln in Germany. She was a soloist with Australian symphony orchestras and performed with the Australian Chamber Orchestra.

== Early life ==
Freeman was born in 1954 in Drouin, Victoria, Australia, and studied at Victorian College of the Arts (now part of the University of Melbourne), earning a Diploma of Performing Arts in 1976. She became a lecturer at Canberra Institute of the Arts (now part of Australian National University) and the Victorian College of the Arts. She travelled to Europe (Schola Cantorum Basiliensis in Switzerland) and was Guest Principal Trumpet with the Zurich Chamber Orchestra.

In 1999, she became Professor of Trumpet and Head of Brass at the Hochschule für Musik und Tanz Köln in Aachen, Germany. She has also taught at Switzerland's Musikhochschule Winterthur in Zurich. She released CDs and published her trumpet method in a book called Beyond Brass Basics, A Guide to Common Sense Brass Playing (Spaeth/Schmid Verlag). She performs concerts and recitals and records around the world including Europe, USA, New Zealand, Japan, and Australia.

== Discography ==
=== "Baroque Trumpet and Strings" ===
Supported by Australian baroque string and keyboard players, Freeman's CD covers repertoire from a diverse group of eight composers. Performers include the following:

- Linda Kent - organ
- Anna Freeman - baroque trumpet
- Julie Hewison - first violin
- Lucinda Moon - second violin
- Miriam Morris - cello
- Jenny Ingram - viola
