= Crispian Steele-Perkins =

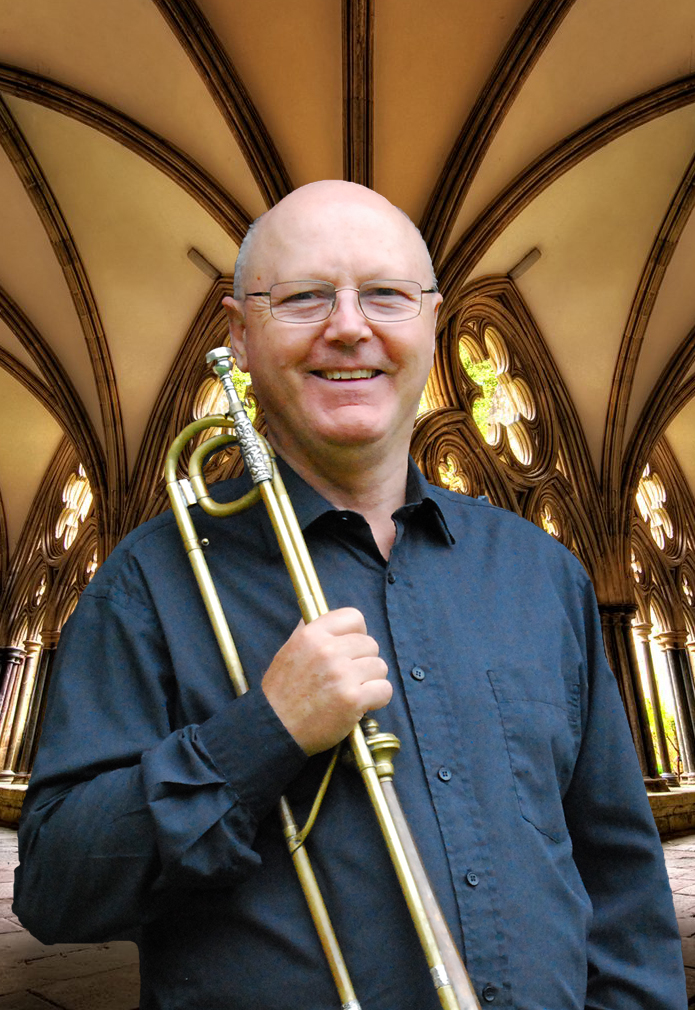
- Crispian at Salisbury Cathedral

Background information
- Born: Crispian Guy Steele-Perkins; 18 December 1944 (age 81); Exeter, Devon United Kingdom
- Genres: Classical,
- Occupations: Musician, professor
- Instrument: Trumpet
- Years active: 1964 - Current
- Label: Independent
- Website: Crispian Steele-Perkins Official website

Crispian Guy Steele-Perkins (born 18 December 1944) is an internationally acclaimed English classical trumpeter who was educated at Copthorne Preparatory School, Marlborough College and the Guildhall School of Music.

== Personal life ==
Steele-Perkins lives in Dorking, Surrey and is the father of Emma, Kate and Guy. He is also grandfather to William and Ben Mitchell and Isabelle and Zoe Jinadu. In 1967, he married Angela Helen Hall (d. 1991), and in 1995 he married Jane Elizabeth Mary Steele-Perkins.

== Career ==
Steele-Perkins picked up his first trumpet at the age of ten and progressed so quickly that just 6 years later he was playing with the English National Youth Orchestra. On graduating from the Guildhall School of Music, having studied with Bernard Brown, Steele-Perkins began his professional career with the Sadler's Wells Theatre (ENO) 1966–73, before performing with the London Gabrielli Brass Ensemble 1974–84, Royal Philharmonic Orchestra 1976–80, English Baroque Soloists 1980–91, Amsterdam Baroque Orchestra, The King's Consort, 1985–2009. Steele-Perkins's purity of tone and artistic subtlety have received critical acclaim for more than four decades now. Throughout the 1980s and 1990s, he played a key role in the growth of historically-aware trumpet playing, using a collection of more than 100 pre-1900 mechanised and 'natural' trumpets to bring a brighter, clearer sound to baroque performances. In 2004, Steele-Perkins received the Monk Award for his significant and lifelong contribution to the field of early brass music. In October 2015 BBC’s CD Review programme (now Record Review) selected his recording of Joseph Haydn’s Trumpet Concerto in Eb with the English Chamber Orchestra as the best available recording of the work.

In addition to his work with classical orchestras and period instruments, Steele-Perkins has developed a body of television and film work which is universally recognisable today – most famously he played the theme tune to the popular British television programme Antiques Roadshow. As a studio musician he also played for many film scores including Wild Geese, Zulu Dawn, Watership Down and Jaws 2 in 1978, The Life of Brian, Moonraker in 1979, Superman 2 in 1980, History of the World, Part 1, For Your Eyes Only, Arthur in 1981, Gandhi and Rambo in 1982, Never Say Never, Octopussy in 1983, Supergirl in 1984, Santa Claus, A View to Kill in 1985 and Robocop in 1988. Thereafter he became established as an international solo performer upon the Baroque Trumpet and toured the globe extensively.

Steele-Perkins is a presenter giving recitals, lectures and masterclasses at schools, colleges and music venues around the world. He has a collection of antique trumpets from the late 18th century to 1920s and in later years has become an enthusiastic motorcyclist.

In June 2026, Steele-Perkins was interviewed by Hannah French in an episode of The Early Music Show on BBC Radio 3, discussing the evolution of musical pitch through the centuries.

== Selected recordings ==
- Eternal Source of Light Divine, with James Bowman and The King's Consort, Purcell, Hyperion Records CDA66315
- Classical Trumpet Concertos, with The King's Consort, Hyperion Records (2001) CDA67266
- The Well-Tempered Trumpet, with Leslie Pearson, LDR Recordings (1989) LDRCD 1006
- Music for Trumpet & Orchestra, Tafelmusik and Jeanne Lamon, Sony Classical Records (1993) SK 53 365
- Let The Trumpet Sound, with the Bournemouth Sinfonietta, Carlton Classics (1996) 30366 00382
- The Regents Bugle, with Ian Partridge, Leslie Pearson and David Woodcock, Independent
- Let The Bright Seraphim, with Jeni Bern and The Handel Players, Carlton Classics (1998) 30366 01182
- Trumpets Ancient and Modern, with David Hill, Herald AV Publications (2000) HAVPCD 251
- Trumpet Concertos, with the English Chamber Orchestra, Alto (1986) ALTO 1063
- The Music of Gershwin, with Leslie Pearson, Independent (2007)
