= Niklas Eklund =

Swedish classical trumpeter (1969–2025)

Niklas Eklund (1969 – 10 April 2025) was a Swedish trumpeter.

== Life and career ==
Eklund was born in Gothenburg in 1969 into a musical family; his father, Bengt, was a noted trumpeter and conductor. Eklund studied with his father, as well as at the School of Music and Musicology of the University of Gothenburg.

Further studies took place under the tutelage of Edward H. Tarr at the Schola Cantorum Basiliensis. After five years as solo trumpeter with the Basel Radio Symphony Orchestra, Eklund left the orchestra in the autumn of 1996 to pursue a solo career, during which he collaborated with many leading musicians and conductors, including Cecilia Bartoli, Zubin Mehta, John Eliot Gardiner, Heinz Holliger, András Schiff, John Foster, Iván Fischer and Gustav Leonhardt.

In 1996, Eklund won first prize at the first Altenburg International Baroque Trumpet competition, held in Bad Säckingen, Germany.

As a specialist on the notoriously difficult baroque trumpet, he demonstrated exceptional interpretive skill coupled with a high degree of control and precision. Christopher Martin, Principal Trumpet of the New York Philharmonic, says: "Niklas Eklund's Art of the Baroque Trumpet series [on Naxos], is the most lyrically gorgeous trumpet playing you'll ever hear."

Eklund played an extensive part in the "Bach Pilgrimage" series of performances and recordings directed by Sir John Eliot Gardiner (available on Deutsche Grammophon Archiv CDs), beginning in the year 2000. Besides giving concerts in Sweden and Europe, Eklund appeared as a guest performer and teacher in the USA, Australia, the Ukraine, Russia and New Zealand (condensed from the artist's website).

Eklund died on 10 April 2025, at the age of 56.
