= Johann Nepomuk Hummel =

Austrian composer and pianist (1778–1837)

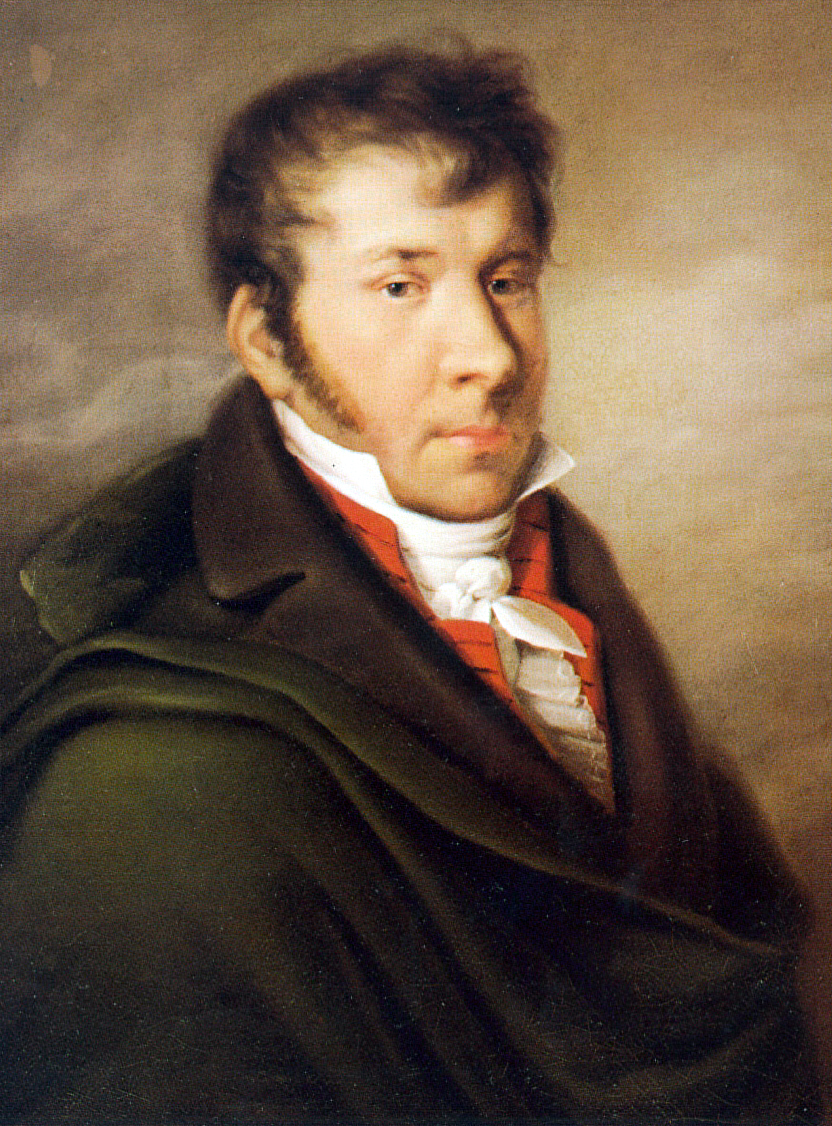
- Portrait by Joseph Willibrord Mähler, c. 1814
- Born: 14 November 1778; Pressburg, Kingdom of Hungary (now Bratislava, Slovakia)
- Died: 17 October 1837 (aged 58); Weimar, Saxe-Weimar-Eisenach, German Confederation (now Weimar, Thuringia, Germany)
- Occupations: Composer; pianist
- Works: List of compositions
- Spouse: Elisabeth Röckel (m. 1813)
- Children: Eduard; Carl

Johann Nepomuk Hummel (14 November 1778 – 17 October 1837) was an Austrian composer and pianist. His music reflects the transition from the Classical to the Romantic musical era. He was among Wolfgang Amadeus Mozart and Antonio Salieri's best students. He also studied under Joseph Haydn. Hummel significantly influenced later piano music of the nineteenth century, particularly in the works of Frédéric Chopin, Franz Liszt, and Felix Mendelssohn.

== Life ==
=== Early life ===
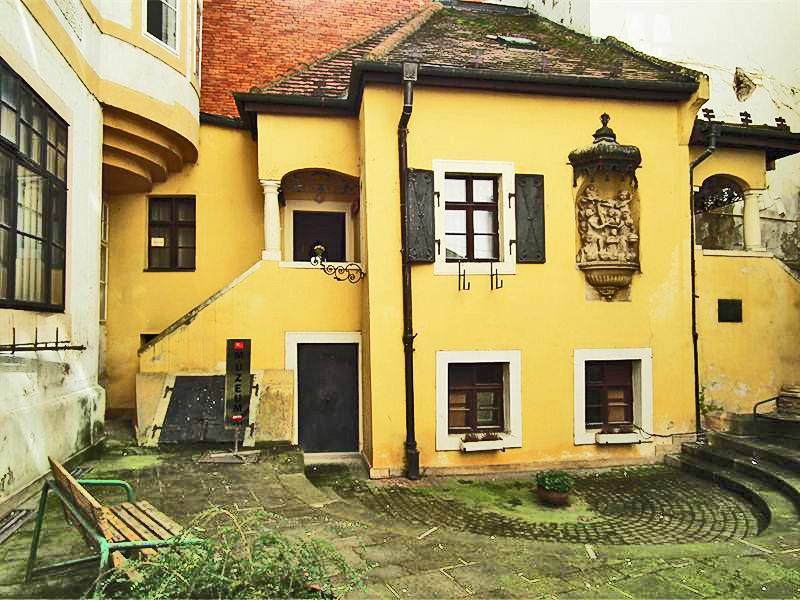
Hummel's birthplace in Klobučnícka St., Bratislava

Hummel was born in Pressburg, Kingdom of Hungary (now Bratislava, Slovakia). Unusually for that period, he was an only child. He was named after the Czech patron saint John of Nepomuk. His father, Johannes Hummel, was a violinist and music teacher who served in the household orchestra of Count Grassalkovich and later as orchestra director at the Pressburg Theatre before becoming music director at the military academy in Wartberg (now Senec, Slovakia) around 1780. Following the dissolution of this institution under Joseph II's reforms, the family relocated to Vienna in late 1786 or early 1787, where Johannes became music director at the Theater auf der Wieden and later at the Apollo-Tanzsaal. His mother, Margarethe Sommer Hummel, was the widow of the wigmaker Josef Ludwig. The couple married just four months before his birth.

Hummel was a child prodigy. At the age of eight, he was offered music lessons by the classical composer Wolfgang Amadeus Mozart, who was impressed with his ability. Hummel was taught and housed by Mozart for two years free of charge. He made his first concert appearance at the age of nine, at one of Mozart's concerts.

Hummel's father then took him on a European tour, arriving in London in 1790, where he received lessons from Muzio Clementi. He played to much acclaim at the Hanover Square Rooms, performing a Mozart piano concerto and a sonata of his own. In 1791, at the same venue, the thirteen-year-old Hummel premiered a piano trio by Haydn.

He returned to Vienna in 1793, giving concerts along his route. Upon his return, he was taught by Johann Georg Albrechtsberger, Joseph Haydn, and Antonio Salieri. At about this time, young Ludwig van Beethoven arrived in Vienna and also took lessons from Haydn and Albrechtsberger. The two men became friendly rivals, and Hummel took part in several performances of Beethoven's orchestral work Wellingtons Sieg.

On 16 May 1813, he married the opera singer Elisabeth Röckel. The following year, at her request, was spent touring Russia and the rest of Europe. The couple had two sons. The younger, Carl (1821–1907), became a well-known landscape painter. The older, Eduard, worked as pianist, conductor, and composer; he moved to the U.S. and died in Troy, New York.

Hummel visited Beethoven in Vienna on several occasions with his wife Elisabeth and his pupil Ferdinand Hiller. Hummel would later perform at Beethoven's memorial concert.

Hummel had made friends with Franz Schubert, who dedicated his last three piano sonatas to Hummel. However, both men had died by the time of the first publication of the sonatas, and the publishers changed the dedication to Robert Schumann.

=== Career ===
In 1804, Haydn appointed Hummel as his successor as Konzertmeister of Nikolaus II, Prince Esterházy's estate at Eisenstadt. Although he had taken over many of the duties of Kapellmeister because Haydn's health did not permit him to perform them himself, he continued to be known simply as the Konzertmeister out of respect to Haydn, receiving the title of Kapellmeister, or music director, to the Eisenstadt court only after the older composer died in May 1809. He remained in the service of Prince Esterházy for seven years altogether before being dismissed in May 1811 for neglecting his duties.

Hummel later held the positions of Kapellmeister in Stuttgart from 1816 to 1818 and in Weimar from 1819 to 1837, where he formed a friendship with Goethe. Hummel brought one of the first musicians' pension schemes into existence, giving benefit concert tours to help raise funds. In his fight against unethical music publishers, Hummel also was a key figure in establishing the principles of intellectual property and copyright law.

In 1825, the Parisian music-publishing firm of Aristide Farrenc announced that it had acquired the French publishing rights for all future works by Hummel. In 1830, Hummel gave three concerts in Paris; at one of them, a rondo by Hummel was performed by Aristide Farrenc's wife, the composer Louise Farrenc, who also "sought Hummel's comments on her keyboard technique".

In 1832, at the age of 54 and in failing health, Hummel began to devote less energy to his duties as music director at Weimar. In addition, after Goethe's death in March 1832 he had less contact with local theatrical circles and as a result was in partial retirement from 1832 until his death in 1837.

=== Last years and legacy ===
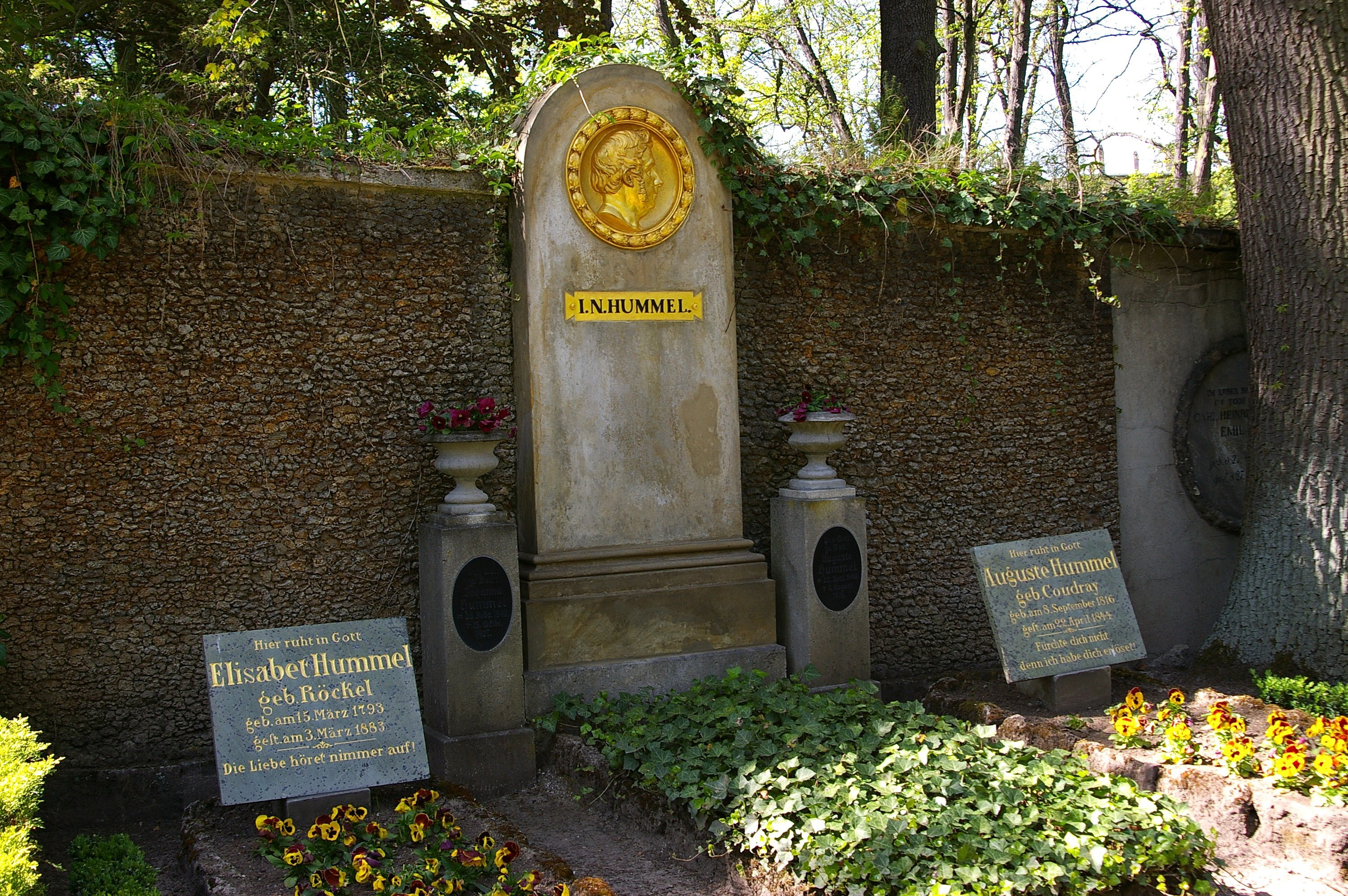
Hummel's grave in the Historical Cemetery, Weimar

At the end of his life, Hummel saw the rise of a new school of young composers and virtuosi, and found his own music slowly going out of fashion. His disciplined and clean Clementi-style technique, and his balanced classicism, opposed him to the rising school of tempestuous bravura displayed by the likes of Beethoven and Liszt. Composing less and less, but still highly respected and admired, Hummel died peacefully in Weimar on 17 October 1837. Like Haydn, Mozart, and some other notable composers of the time, Hummel was a freemason. Hummel bequeathed a considerable portion of his famous garden behind his Weimar residence to his masonic lodge. His grave is in the Historical Cemetery, Weimar.

Although Hummel died famous, with a lasting posthumous reputation apparently secure, he and his music were quickly forgotten at the onrush of the Romantic period, perhaps because his classical ideas were seen as old-fashioned. Later, during the classical revival of the early twentieth century, Hummel was passed over. As with Franz Joseph Haydn, whose musical revival had to wait until the second half of the twentieth century, Hummel was overshadowed by Mozart and especially, Beethoven. Due to an increasing number of recordings and live performances, his music has become reestablished in the classical repertoire.

Notable students include Ferdinand Hiller and Alexander Müller.

== Music ==
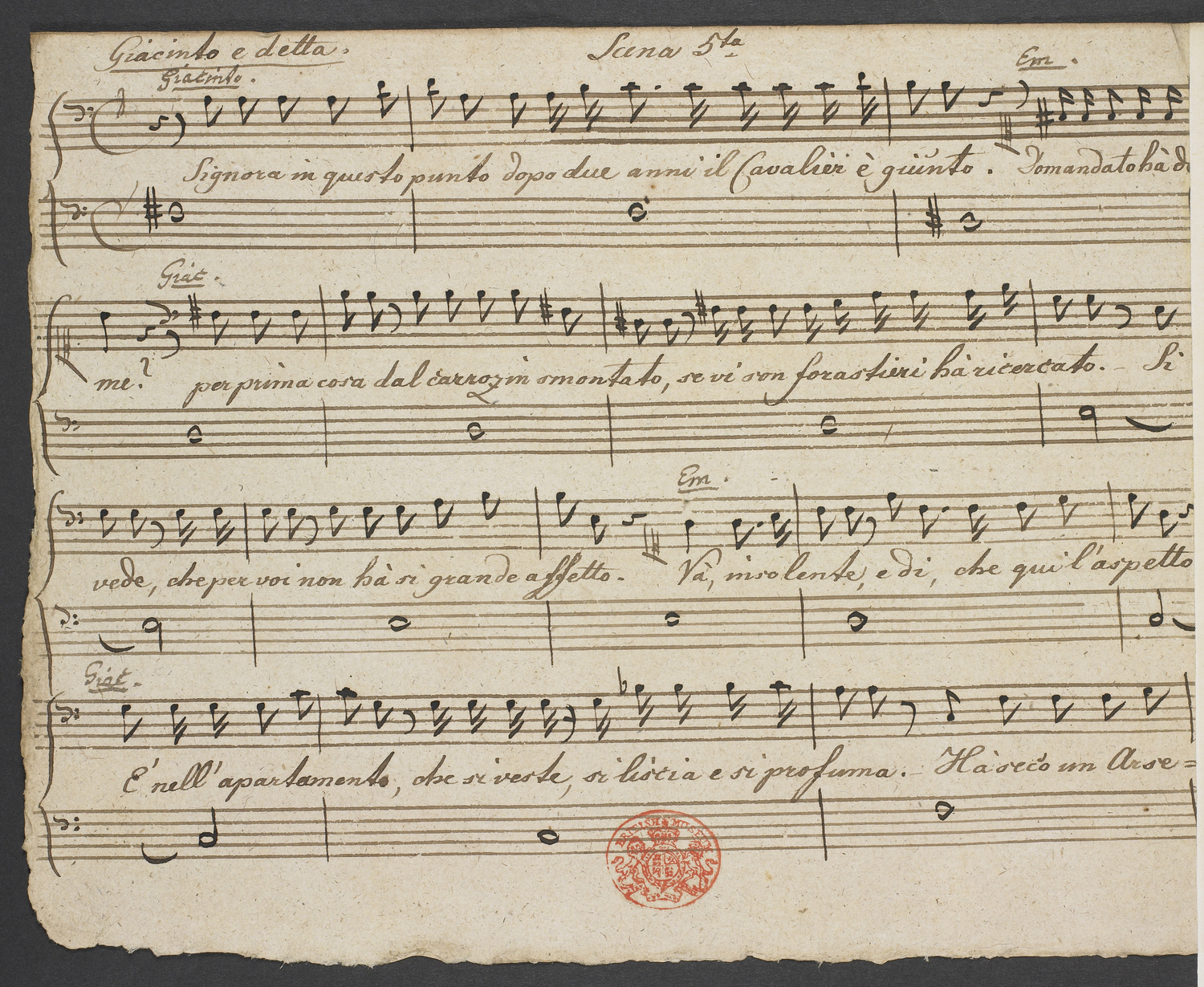
A surviving manuscript of Hummel's work, probably in his own hand

Hummel's music took a different direction from that of Beethoven. Looking forward, Hummel stepped into modernity through pieces such as his Piano Sonata in F♯ minor, Op. 81, cherished by Robert Schumann, and his Fantasy, Op. 18, which would have a major influence on Schubert's Wanderer Fantasy, for piano. These pieces are examples where Hummel may be seen to both challenge the classical harmonic structures and to stretch the sonata form.

His main oeuvre is for the piano, on which instrument he was one of the great virtuosi of his day. He wrote eight piano concertos, a double concerto for violin and piano, ten piano sonatas, eight piano trios, a piano quartet, two piano septets, a piano quintet, and four hand piano music. Of his eight piano concertos the first two are early compositions (S. 4/WoO 24 and S. 5) and the later six were numbered and published with opus numbers (Opp. 36, 85 (number 2 in A minor), 89, 110, 113, and posth), his often performed Piano Concerto No. 5 in Ab Op 113.

Aside from the piano, Hummel wrote a wind octet, a cello sonata, a mandolin concerto, a mandolin sonata, a Trumpet Concerto in E major written for the keyed trumpet (usually heard now in E♭ major – better suited to modern trumpets), a "Grand Bassoon Concerto" in F, a quartet for clarinet, violin, viola, and cello, 22 operas and Singspiels, masses, and more. He also wrote a variation on a theme supplied by Anton Diabelli for part 2 of Vaterländischer Künstlerverein.

Hummel was very interested in the guitar and was talented with the instrument. He was prolific in his writing for it, beginning with opus 7 and finishing with opus 93. Other guitar works include Opp. 43, 53, 62, 63, 66, 71, and 91, which are written for a mixture of instruments.

Hummel's output is marked by the conspicuous lack of a symphony. However, he would arrange Mozart and Beethoven‘s symphonies for piano, violin, cello and flute as well as Beethoven’s Septet.

== Influence ==
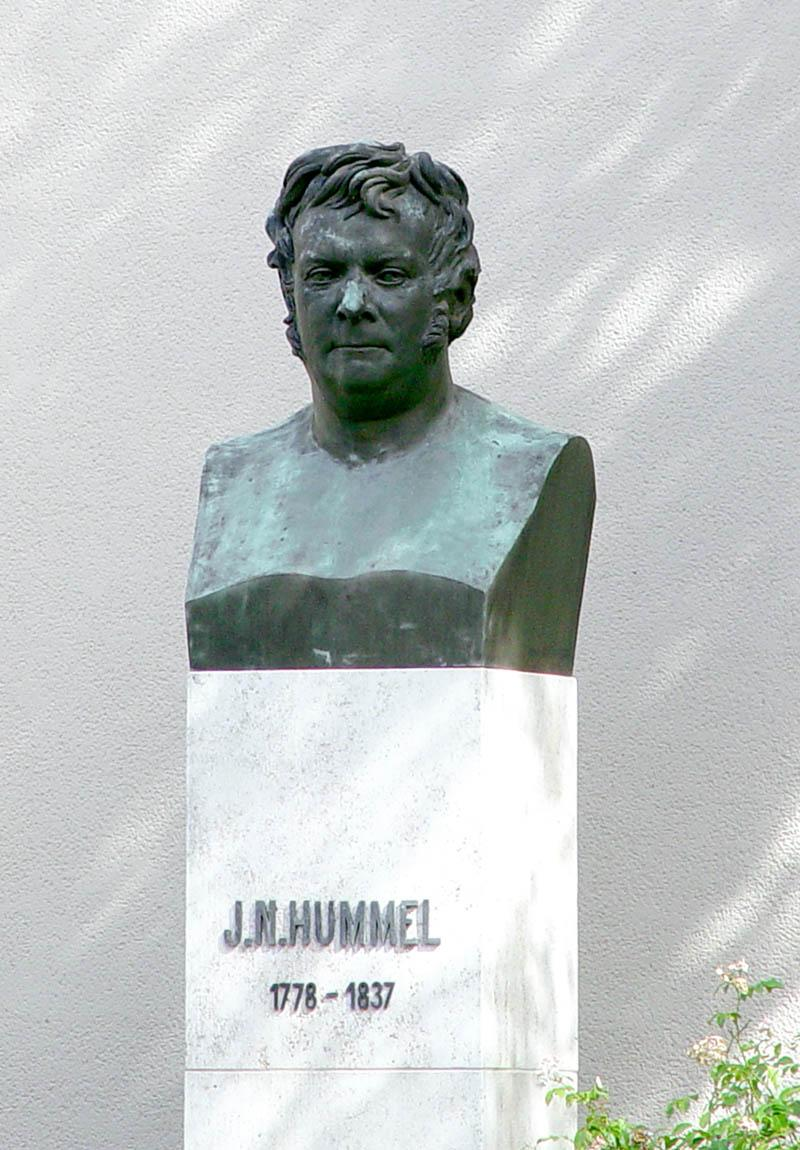
Bust of Hummel near the Deutsches Nationaltheater in Weimar

While in Germany, Hummel published A Complete Theoretical and Practical Course of Instruction on the Art of Playing the Piano Forte (Anweisung zum Pianofortespiel, 1828). It sold thousands of copies within days of its publication and brought about a new style of fingering and of playing ornaments.

Later nineteenth-century pianistic technique was influenced by Hummel, through his instruction of Carl Czerny who later taught Franz Liszt. Czerny had transferred to Hummel after studying three years with Beethoven. Liszt knew and admired Hummel deeply and often performed his works, a particular favourite being the Septet Op. 74.

Hummel's influence also can be seen in the early works of Felix Mendelssohn, Frédéric Chopin, and Robert Schumann. The shadow of Hummel's Piano Concerto in B minor as well as his Piano Concerto in A minor may be particularly perceived in Chopin's concertos. This is unsurprising, considering that Chopin must have heard Hummel on one of the latter's concert tours to Poland and Russia, and that Chopin kept Hummel's piano concertos in his active repertoire. Harold C. Schonberg, in The Great Pianists, writes "...the openings of the Hummel A minor and the Chopin E minor concertos are too close to be coincidental". In relation to Chopin's Preludes, Op. 28, Schonberg says: "It also is hard to escape the notion that Chopin was very familiar with Hummel's now-forgotten Op. 67, composed in 1815 – a set of twenty-four preludes in all major and minor keys, starting with C major".

Schumann studied Hummel's Anweisung zum Pianofortespiel, and considered becoming his pupil. Liszt's father Adam refused to pay the high tuition fee Hummel was used to charging (thus Liszt ended up studying with Czerny). Czerny, Friedrich Silcher, Ferdinand Hiller, Sigismond Thalberg, and Adolf von Henselt were among Hummel's most prominent students. He also briefly gave some lessons to Felix Mendelssohn.

According to Schubert's friend Albert Stadler, Schubert's Trout Quintet was modelled on an earlier Hummel work, the quintet version of his Septet in D minor for Flute, Oboe, Horn, Viola, Cello, Bass, and Piano, Op. 74. It also may have been influenced by Hummel's Quintet in E♭, Op. 87.
