= History of the trumpet =

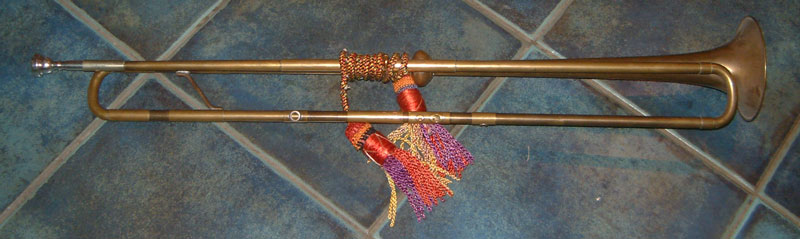
A reproduction of a Baroque trumpet

The chromatic trumpet of Western tradition is a fairly recent invention, but primitive trumpets of one form or another have been in existence for millennia; some of the predecessors of the modern instrument are now known to date back to the Neolithic era. The earliest of these primordial trumpets were adapted from animal horns and sea shells, and were common throughout Europe, Africa, India and, to a lesser extent, the Middle East. Primitive trumpets eventually found their way to most parts of the globe, though even today indigenous varieties are quite rare in the Americas, the Far East and South-East Asia. Some species of primitive trumpets can still be found in remote places, where they have remained largely untouched by the passage of time.

For the most part, these primitive instruments were "natural trumpets": that is to say, they had none of those devices (fingerholes, keys, slides or valves) by which the pitch of an instrument might be altered. It is in fact quite exceptional to come across a chromatic trumpet – primitive or otherwise – which is not derived from the chromatic trumpet of Western tradition; the bās of Madhya Pradesh in India, which has fingerholes bored into the side of its tube, is one such exception.

== Primitive trumpets ==
The simplest – and presumably the earliest – type of trumpet was made from the hollowed-out horn or shell of an animal, into the end of which a hole was bored for the mouth. This "trumpet" had neither a mouthpiece nor a bell, and was not so much a musical instrument as a megaphone into which one spoke, sang, or shouted. Typically only one or two different pitches could be produced on such an instrument, though sometimes a small fingerhole was bored in the tip to provide the player with an extra pitch. Most of these early trumpets were end-blown, like the modern trumpet; side-blown varieties, however, were not unknown, and can still be found in Africa and other parts of the globe.

The strident sound and distinct forms afforded to them by the animal origins of these early trumpets made them suitable as audio-visual instruments for warfare and the chase with which they are often associated.

== Animal-horn trumpets ==
Animal-horn trumpets are still employed today, especially in Africa, though they are also found in Israel, Asia and Oceania. With the exception of African varieties, most are end-blown instruments from which the tip has been removed to provide a mouthhole. In the majority of cases the player's lips are applied directly to the mouthhole; sometimes, however, the instrument has a detachable mouthpiece. Cattle, sheep, goats and antelopes are among the animals whose horns are – or have been – most frequently used to make such trumpets. The following examples may be briefly noted:

- The Sumerian si was the ordinary word for animal horn. Literary references show that as an instrument it was played in the streets by the herald who delivered public announcements.
- The Jewish shofar is perhaps the best-known animal-horn trumpet. It is usually made from a ram's horn, though the horn of any kosher animal other than a cow or calf may be used. The shofar, which is still employed in Jewish religious ceremonies today, is an ancient instrument; it is mentioned frequently in the Bible and rabbinic literature. It can generally produce only two pitches; theoretically, these should be a fifth apart (being the second and third partials of the instrument's harmonic series); the irregular bore of the instrument, however, can reduce this to as little as a fourth or increase it to as much as a sixth. These acoustical details apply to most animal-horn trumpets.

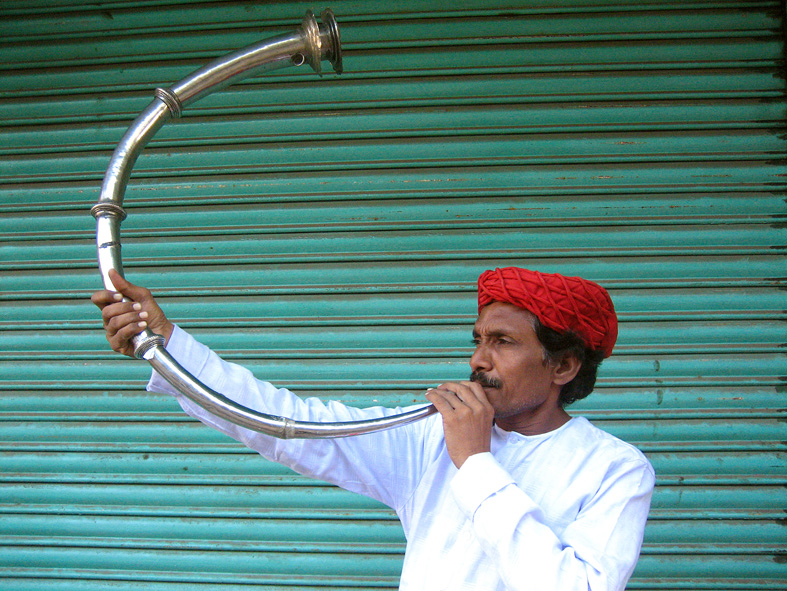
Shringa- an Indian trumpet

- The Indian shringa, or ṣṛnga, (Sanskrit for "horn") was originally made from the horn of the buffalo, though the term was later applied to almost any kind of horn or trumpet, irrespective of its origin. In the south of the country the general name of the instrument is kombu, a Dravidian term which also means "horn". The shringa is an end-blown instrument, though one particular variety – the singha of Orissa – is side-blown. The shringa and its close relations are known by various names in different parts of India: singe (the shringa of the Bhils), sakna (a buffalo horn of the Santals), reli'ki (the Angami's buffalo horn, which has a bamboo mouthpiece), visan (a buffalo horn of Uttar Pradesh), singi (a deer horn of Uttar Pradesh), and kohuk (a horn of the Marias of Madhya Pradesh). India's national epic, the Mahābhārata, mentions the govishanika, which is thought to have been a cow's horn. Many species of shringa can still be found in India today.
- The Greek keras ("horn") and the Etrusco-Roman cornu (Latin for "horn") were originally simple animal-horn trumpets, though both were superseded by more advanced instruments to which they lent their names.
- The Germanic cowhorn, or Stierhorn, which was generally made from the horn of an aurochs or buffalo.
- The rwa-dun is a Tibetan ram's-horn trumpet similar to the Jewish shofar. It has been used for centuries in Buddhist ceremonies for the purposes of exorcism.
- The Latvian āžrag was made from a goat's horn, and was blown by young men in the summertime to announce their intention to take a wife.
- The engombe is a side-blown trumpet found in Uganda; it is usually made from a cow's horn and is blown by Bugandan huntsmen to ensure a successful hunt.

== Conch-shell trumpets ==
Conch shells have also been used as primitive instruments since Neolithic times, and must be numbered among the antecedents of the natural trumpet. The four shells most commonly used for this purpose are the triton or trumpet shell, the cassis or helmet shell, the fusus, and the strombus or true conch, though the term "conch-shell trumpet" is generally applied to all instruments of this type. The spiral interior of the shell acts as tubing, and a mouthhole is created either by breaking off the point of the shell (end-blown conch) or by boring a small hole in the body (side-blown conch). The cassis is an end-blown shell; the other three types are usually side-blown.

Conch-shell trumpets are found in almost every part of the globe, including inland areas like Tibet, Central Europe and the Andes. They are especially common throughout Oceania, where the conch-shell trumpet was once used on religious, ceremonial and military occasions. Today, however, the instrument is more often associated with mundane events like football matches; the Tongan football team is regularly encouraged by ensembles of up to nine kele'a. In the South Pacific island nation of Vanuatu, local fishermen use conch-shell trumpets known as tapáe to call for assistance when they are drawing in their nets. In Fiji, the davui conch-shell trumpet is still blown to invoke the gods.

End-blown conch-shell trumpets are still used as sacred ritual instruments in Asia. The Indian śańkh or śańkham is blown by Brahmins in Hindu temples throughout India and South Asia, and is also used today as an instrument of folk music and dance; formerly it was employed as a heraldic instrument to declare war or celebrate victory. According to Hindu mythology the śankh will be blown by Siva at the end of the current World Age as a sort of Last Trump.

The conch shell is also used as a signal in Buddhist ceremonies in the Far East. In Tibet it is known as the dun-dkar, or dung-dkar; in China it is the faluo or hai lo, and in Japan the horagai or hora.

== Early manufactured trumpets ==
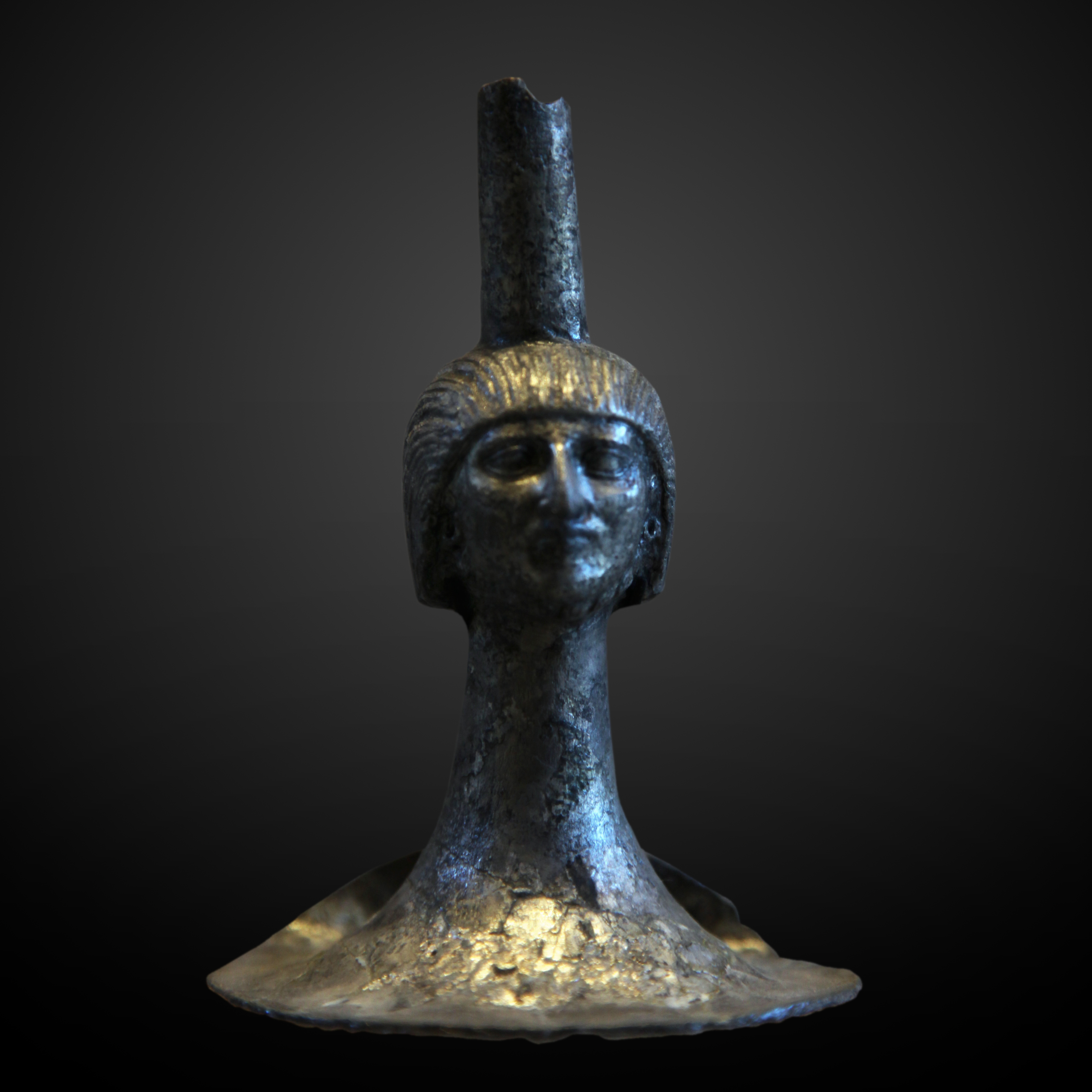
Short sheet-metal trumpet from the Bactria, dated from 2100 B.C.- 1900 B.C. This particular example is missing its mouthpiece. Labeled Oxus type bulb trumpets, these trumpets were designed to produce a soft, very high pitch with "modest" tension in the player's lips.

The earliest artificial trumpets appeared before the end of the Neolithic, and were adapted from the natural models provided by animal-horns and conch-shells. They were – and in some parts of the world are still – made from a variety of perishable and non-perishable materials, including bark, wood, gourds, bamboo, horn, bone, ivory, clay and, of course, metal. Early metallic trumpets were either hammered from sheets of a suitable metal (e.g. silver) or cast in bronze by the lost-wax method. Among these primitive trumpets the following may be noted:

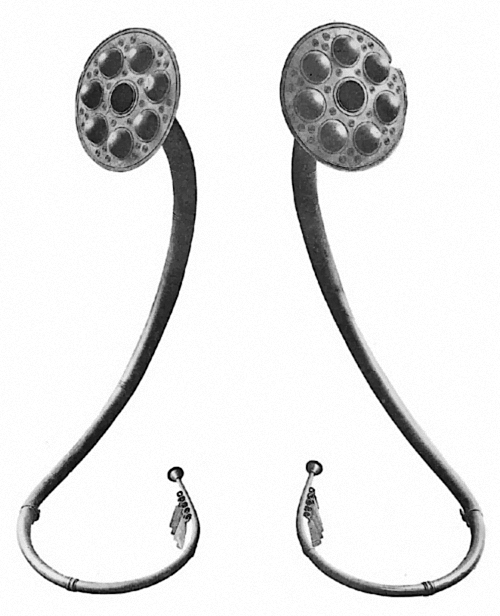
Brudevælte Lurs, Denmark.

- The ancient Nordic lur was made of bronze and dates back to the Late Bronze Age (1000–500 BCE). This extraordinary instrument consisted of an elaborate S-shaped conical tube, usually about 2 metres (7 ft) in length, with a slightly flared bell. It was an end-blown natural trumpet, and sounded rather like a modern trombone. To date, fifty-six lurs have been found: thirty-five in Denmark, eleven in Sweden, four in Norway, five in northern Germany, and one in Latvia. They have often been discovered in matching pairs, which suggests that they were used for ceremonial or religious purposes, rather than as instruments of war. The original name of the instrument is unknown.
- The Celtic carnyx was also made of bronze, and was used as an instrument of war during the Iron Age (c. 300 BCE – 200 CE). It consisted of a cylindrical tube about 2 metres (7 ft) long; the bell was elaborately carved to resemble a wild boar's head, with a movable tongue and jaw; the mouthpiece was curved. The carnyx was held vertically with the bell above the player's head. The instrument is most often associated with the Celts, but is now known to have been used also by the inhabitants of ancient Dacia. A similar S-shaped trumpet from the Iron Age has been found at Loughnashade in Ireland. Named the trumpa créda (archaic Irish for "bronze trumpet"), it consists of two curved tubes of bronze, each comprising a quarter circle, one of which is of conical bore and one of cylindrical bore, with a joint in the middle. The Loughnashade trumpet is generally displayed with the two halves joined together to make a semicircle, but it is now thought to have been played with the two parts bending in opposite directions to make an S-shaped trumpet not unlike the carnyx, to which it may have been related.
- In India the primitive shringa or kombu was adapted to make a great variety of metallic trumpets. The modern kombu is generally a C-shaped instrument made of brass or copper, with a conical bore and a detachable mouthpiece. It is still played at weddings and funerals, and during religious processions. There are two sizes of kombu: the small timiri kombu and the large bari kombu. Another type of brass kombu – known variously as turi, bānkiā, bargu, banke, ransingha, narsingha, narsĩgā and nagphani in different parts of the subcontinent – is S-shaped and looks remarkably like the trumpa créda of Ireland. Indigenous straight trumpets have been made in India since the Neolithic and are still found today in various guises and under various names: turahi, turya, tutari, tuttoori, bhongal, kahal, kahala, and bhenr. The booraga of Sanskrit literature was possibly also a straight trumpet made of brass or copper.
- The wooden lur of medieval Scandinavia (not to be confused with the much earlier bronze instrument to which it has lent its name) is referred to in the Icelandic sagas as an instrument of war, used to marshal troops and frighten the enemy. It is also mentioned by Saxo Grammaticus in his Gesta Danorum. This particular species of lur was a straight, end-blown natural trumpet, with a cylindrical tube about 1 metre (3 ft) long. It was made of wood – typically by cutting a thick branch in half lengthwise and hollowing it out, and then rejoining the two-halves, which are secured with tar and willow osiers. A similar instrument, but secured with birch, known as the birch trumpet, has been used in Nordic countries since the Middle Ages as a signalling instrument and to call cattle.
- The Lithuanian daudytė is a natural wooden trumpet similar to the wooden lur of Scandinavia; its sections are held together with putty and linen yarn.
- The alphorn, or alpenhorn, is a distinctive natural wooden horn with a conical bore, upturned bell and cup-shaped mouthpiece. It has been used as a signalling instrument in the Alpine regions of Europe for about two millennia. The alphorn is generally carved from the solid softwood of the spruce or pine. In former times alphorn makers would use a tree that was already bent at the base, but today's alphorns are pieced together from separate sections, which are secured with bark or gut. The cup-shaped mouthpiece is usually carved out of a block of hardwood.
- The Australian didjeridu is one of the best known species of primitive trumpet. A natural wooden trumpet, it has been in continuous use among the aboriginal peoples of Australia for at least 1,500 years, and possibly much longer. It is usually manufactured from the trunk of a hardwood tree, such as the eucalyptus, which has been suitably hollowed out by termites. The instrument is typically about 1 to 1.5 metres (3 to 5 ft) long; the bore may be conical or cylindrical. By vibrating his lips against the mouthhole the player can produce a deep drone; the note so produced may be sustained indefinitely by means of a technique called circular breathing. Today the didjeridu is frequently played as a solo instrument for recreational purposes, though it was traditionally used to accompany dancing and singing on ceremonial occasions.
- The Ugandan arupepe is a natural wooden trumpet covered with animal hide.
- The molimo is a wooden trumpet used by the Mbuti people of the Congo to awaken the spirit of the Ituri Rainforest. It is also the name of the elaborate ritual in which the instrument plays a vital role.
- Bone trumpets made from human femurs (khang ling) and tiger femurs (stag ling) can still be found in the Himalayas, where they are associated with Buddhist tantra. In Tibet the human thigh-bone trumpet is called the rkan-dun (or rkang-gling) and plays an important role in the traditional shamanistic religion known as Bön. In the Tibetan language the word dun means both "trumpet" and "bone"! Brass replicas of bone trumpets are also known in Tibet.
- The borija, a short natural trumpet found in Bosnia-Herzegovina, is made from the spiral shavings of the willow or ash, bound firmly into a conical tube about 50 cm (20 in) long.
- The obsolete tāšu taure of Latvia was of similar design to the borija, but it was made from birch bark and could be up to 150 cm (5 ft) long.
- In the Amazon rainforest giant trumpets up to 4 metres (13 ft) in length are made from tightly coiled bark; sticks are attached to one or both sides of the instruments to support them and prevent sagging.
- Bamboo trumpets can be found in many parts of Africa and South America, but are almost unheard of in the bamboo-rich regions of China and South-East Asia. A notable exception is provided by the bamboo "brass-band" tradition of Sulawesi, which is actually quite a recent tradition. In the 19th century Dutch missionaries introduced European brass bands to the island; later, in the 1920s, local craftsmen began to make bamboo replicas of these modern instruments. Today most replicas are made of zinc, though bamboo examples can still be found in isolated pockets, such as the Sangir Archipelago, which lies to the north of Sulawesi.
- Gourds, the hollow, dried shells of the fruit of a member of the family Cucurbitaceae, can be adapted quite easily to make natural trumpets. Gourd trumpets have been used in Africa for centuries, and are also to be found in Asia and the Americas; one particular variety of gourd, the calabash, is even known as the "trumpet gourd". The gourd trumpet was also used by the Aztecs and other indigenous peoples of Central America. One notable variety, the Mayan Hom-Tah, has been compared to the Australian didjeridu. Among the gourd trumpets that are still in use today is the waza of the Berta people, who live in the Blue Nile region of the Sudan.

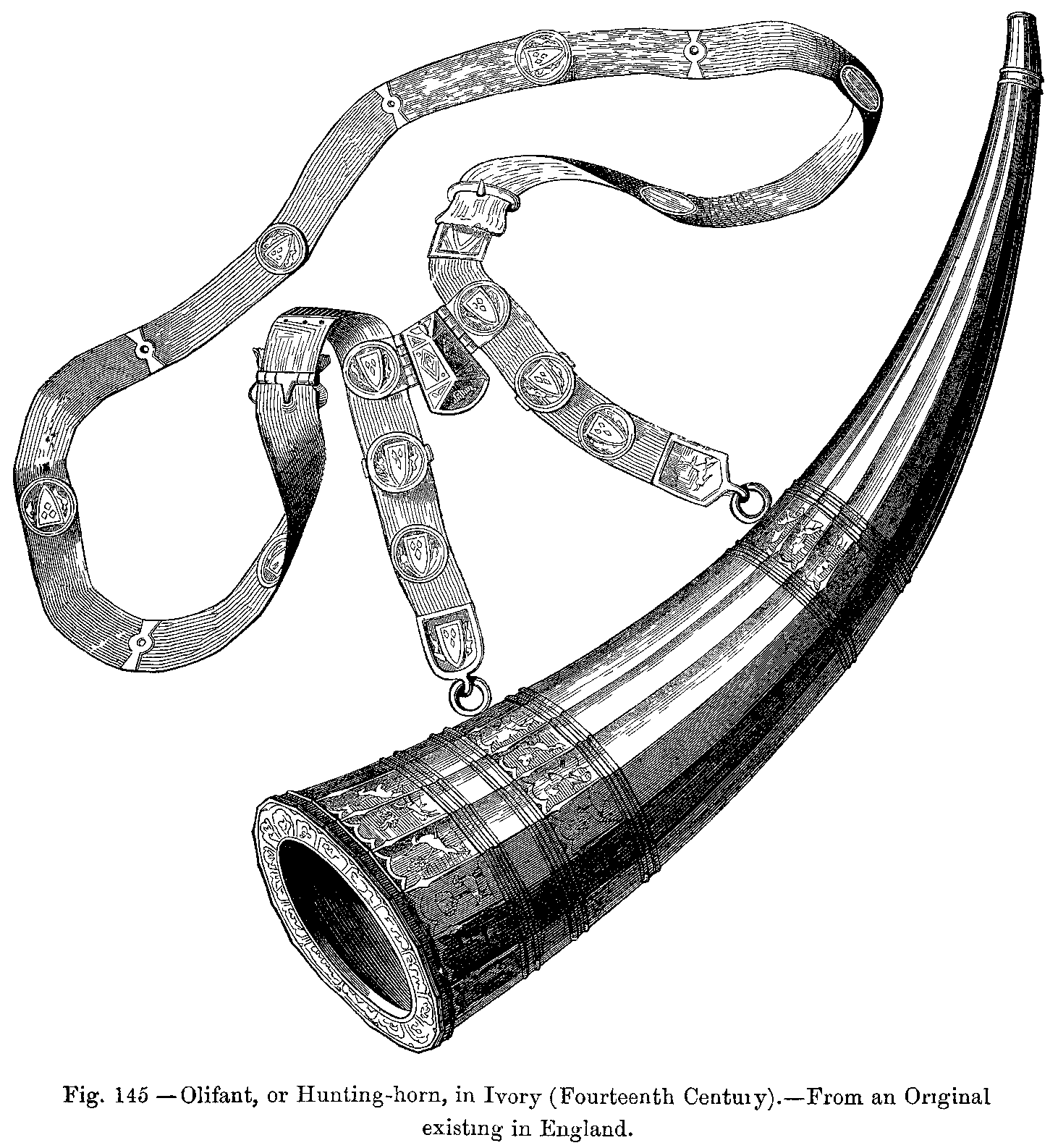
A 14th-century olifant.

- Most trumpets fashioned from the ivory tusks of an elephant are of African origin; both end-blown and side-blown varieties can still be found in some parts of the continent today. The most notable exception is the medieval olifant, a short, thick, end-blown trumpet carved from ivory, which was apparently introduced to Europe by the Saracens at the time of the Crusades; a Middle Eastern instrument, the olifant was possibly adapted by the Arabs from African models, which have a long history.
- Clay trumpets can be found in South America, India, Western Europe and parts of Africa. South American varieties include imitations of conch-shell trumpets, such as the potuto of Peru. The Horniman Museum in London has a red-and-white-marbled clay Portuguese trumpet which was obviously copied from a brass instrument. Coiled clay trumpets probably derive from animal-horn or conch-shell models. Peru had long straight clay trumpets called pungacuqua or puuaqua which were up to 1.5 metres (5 ft) long and were blown in pairs, as was the botuto from the Orinoco basin. Clay trumpets have also been found in Mayan cities in Central America.

== Ancient Egypt ==
Sheneb in hieroglyphs
V7 N35 D58 N34
Šnb

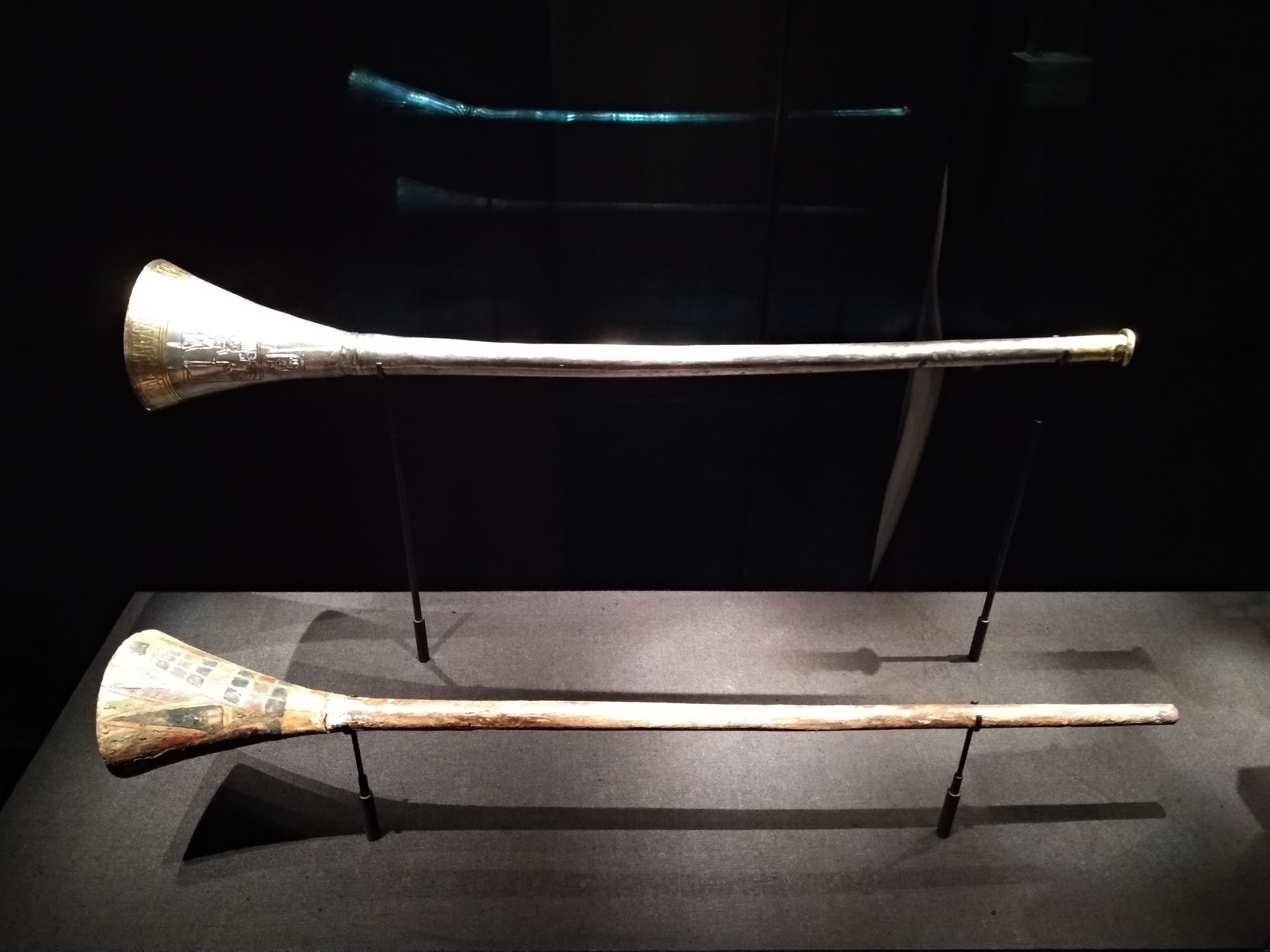
Silver and gold plated trumpet and its wooden mute from the tomb of Tutankhamun (1326–1336 BC)

Sheneb (Ancient Egyptian: šnb) was the common name in Ancient Egypt for straight natural trumpets used for military purposes. The natural trumpet was probably first used as a military instrument in Ancient Egypt. The trumpets depicted by the artists of the Eighteenth Dynasty were short straight instruments made of wood, bronze, copper or silver. According to the Classical writers, the Egyptian trumpet sounded like the braying of an ass.

An early image of an Egyptian trumpet comes from the New Kingdom, circa 1480 B.C. In the mortuary temple of Queen Hatshepsut (c. 1467–1445 B.C.) at Deir el-Bahari, a relief depicts a trumpeter in a military parade.

For the most part the trumpeters depicted in Egyptian art are engaged in military activities – the sheneb was probably used on the battlefield both to encourage (and possibly also to direct) the Pharaoh's troops and to intimidate the enemy. In some murals from the Eighteenth Dynasty, the sheneb appears to be accompanying dancers; if this is the case, it is possibly the earliest depiction of a trumpet in a truly "musical" setting. Egyptian trumpeters are often, though not always, shown in pairs.

The oldest surviving examples of metallic trumpets are the two instruments that were discovered in the tomb of Tutankhamun in 1922. One of these is 58.2 cm (22.9 in) long and is made of silver; it has a conical tube 1.7 to 2.6 cm (0.67 to 1.02 in) in diameter, and a flaring bell 8.2 cm (3.2 in) wide. The other instrument is 50.5 cm (19.9 in) long and is made of copper with gold overlay. Neither instrument has a separate mouthpiece. Both are inscribed with the names of gods associated with Egyptian army divisions. A third trumpet, probably dating from the Ptolemaic era, is now preserved in the Louvre museum in Paris.

== Ancient Israel ==
Other trumpets are mentioned in the Bible besides the primitive shofar, a horn made from a ram's horn whose sound supposedly made the walls of Jericho fall down (Joshua 6); the taqowa' was a Jewish military trumpet which is mentioned in Ezekiel 7:14. The best known Biblical trumpet after the shofar, however, is the hasoserah. In the Book of Numbers, Moses is instructed to make two silver hasoserah:

^{2}Make thee two trumpets of silver; of a whole piece shalt thou make them: that thou mayest use them for the calling of the assembly, and for the journeying of the camps. ^{3}And when they shall blow with them, all the assembly shall assemble themselves to thee at the door of the tabernacle of the congregation. ^{4}And if they blow but with one trumpet, then the princes, which are heads of the thousands of Israel, shall gather themselves unto thee. ^{5}When ye blow an alarm, then the camps that lie on the east parts shall go forward. ^{6}When ye blow an alarm the second time, then the camps that lie on the south side shall take their journey: they shall blow an alarm for their journeys. ^{7}But when the congregation is to be gathered together, ye shall blow, but ye shall not sound an alarm. ^{8}And the sons of Aaron, the priests, shall blow with the trumpets; and they shall be to you for an ordinance for ever throughout your generations. ^{9}And if ye go to war in your land against the enemy that oppresseth you, then ye shall blow an alarm with the trumpets; and ye shall be remembered before the Lord your God, and ye shall be saved from your enemies. ^{10}Also in the day of your gladness, and in your solemn days, and in the beginnings of your months, ye shall blow with the trumpets over your burnt offerings, and over the sacrifices of your peace offerings; that they may be to you for a memorial before your God.... (Numbers 10:2–10, King James Version.)

The hasoserah was played in two different ways: taqa‘ ("blowing")and teruw‘ah ("sounding an alarm"). Blowing was a continuous sounding of the instrument by one or two Levites during religious ceremonies; the sounding of an alarm was generally a military signal, and was always carried out by two players. In the 18th century the German music theorist Johann Ernst Altenburg compared these two styles of playing to the two registers of trumpet playing prevalent in the Late Baroque: the low principale and the high clarino.

The military use of the natural trumpet is mentioned in many passages of the Bible (e.g. Jeremiah 4:19, Zephaniah 1:16, Amos 2:2). Other passages recount its use as a celebratory instrument (e.g. II Kings 11:14, II Chronicles 5:12–13, Psalms 98:6).

Josephus, who credits Moses with the invention of the hasoserah, describes the instrument thus:

In length it was little less than a cubit [45 cm, 18 in]. It was composed of a narrow tube, somewhat thicker than a flute, but with so much breadth as was sufficient for admission of the breath of a man's mouth: it ended in the form of a bell, like common trumpets. Its sound was called in the Hebrew tongue Asosra. (Antiquities of the Jews, 3.291)

The hasoserah is depicted on the Arch of Titus among the spoils taken by the Romans in the sack of Jerusalem in 70 CE (though these particular trumpets appear to be at least 1 metre (3 ft) long).

== Babylon and Assyria ==
A straight trumpet similar to the Egyptian sheneb was also used in ancient Babylonia and Assyria, where it was called the qarna. On a relief from the time of Sennacherib (reigned 705–681 BCE) depicting the moving of a colossal bull statue, two trumpeters are standing on the statue; one is playing while the other rests. Among the descendants of the qarna are the Persian karranay and the Safavid karna. The latter, a straight metallic trumpet, can still be found in northern India.

== Ancient Greece ==
The war-trumpet used by the ancient Greeks was called the salpinx, and was probably adapted from the Egyptian sheneb. There is a fine example on display in Boston's Museum of Fine Arts; the tube of this particular salpinx is 157 cm (62 in) long and consists of thirteen cylindrical parts made of ivory; the instrument's bell and mouthpiece are both made of bronze, as are the rings used to hold the ivory sections together; the instrument is thought to date from the second half of the 5th century BCE. The Greek playwright Aeschylus described the sound of the salpinx as "shattering"; the word salpinx is thought to mean "thunderer".

At the Olympic Games, contests of trumpet playing were introduced for the first time in 396 BCE. These contests were judged not by the participants' musical skill but by the volume of sound they generated. Among the more famous trumpeters who participated in the games was Achias, who was awarded first prize on three occasions and in whose honour a column was erected. Another famous contestant was Herodorus of Megas, a man of immense stature, whose playing was so loud that audiences were allegedly concussed by his performances. By winning the trumpet contest at Olympia, a trumpeter was authorized to perform at the hippodrome and to introduce the athletes for the remainder of the games.

On a painted ceramic knee guard dating from around 500 BCE, a salpinx call is recorded using the Greek syllables TOTH TOTOTE. This is the earliest example of trumpet notation anywhere in the world.

== Etruria and Ancient Rome ==
The use of the natural trumpet as a fully-fledged military signalling instrument is generally credited to the ancient Romans; a total of forty-three signals are said to have been used in the Roman army. Since the early days of the Republic, two centuriates of troops (about 160 men) were composed entirely of trumpeters; these musicians, called aeneatores, employed a variety of instruments. It is now thought that the Romans adapted these instruments, and possibly also the signals sounded on them, from Etruscan models. The Etruscans were expert metallurgists and keen musicians, and musical instruments were just some of the many inventions they bequeathed to their Roman conquerors. Among the trumpet-like instruments used by the Romans, the following four may be distinguished:

- The tuba was a straight trumpet played by tubicines or tubatores. It was about 117 cm (46 in) long and had a conical bore of between 10 and 28 mm (0.39–1.10 in). It was usually made of bronze and was played with a detachable bone mouthpiece. It had a slightly flared bell. The Roman tuba was probably a direct ancestor of both the Western trumpet and the Western horn. (The modern tuba, which shares its name with the Roman tuba, however, is a recent invention.)
- The cornu was a horn about 3 m (10 ft) long, with a wide, conical bore; it was made of bronze and took the form of a letter G. It was played with a cup-shaped mouthpiece. The large flaring bell curved over the player's head or shoulder. The cornu was played by a trumpeter known as a cornicen.
- The buccina, or bucina, was played by a buccinator. This was of similar construction to the cornu and was also played with a cup-shaped mouthpiece, but it had a narrower, more cylindrical bore. The military buccina evolved from a primitive prototype, the buccina marina, which was a natural conch-shell trumpet; in Roman poetry the buccina marina is often called the concha.
- The lituus was a long J-shaped trumpet. Essentially, it was a straight trumpet like the tuba, to which an animal-horn trumpet was attached to act as a bell; it is not unlike the Celtic carnyx. The lituus was a cult instrument used in Roman rituals and does not appear to have had any military uses, though the term was later used in the Middle Ages to denote a military trumpet. Players of the lituus were called liticines. Surviving litui are between 78 and 140 cm (31–55 in) long. Being the shortest of the Roman trumpets, the lituus was a higher pitched instrument, the sound of which Classical writers described as acutus ("high"). The lituus and the buccina are frequently confused.

The late Roman writer Vegetius briefly describes the use of trumpets in the Roman legions in his treatise De re militari:

The legion also has its tubicines, cornicines and buccinatores. The tubicen sounds the charge and the retreat. The cornicines are used only to regulate the motions of the colours; the tubicines serve when the soldiers are ordered out to any work without the colours; but in time of action, the tubicines and cornicines sound together. The classicum, which is a particular signal of the buccinatores or cornicines, is appropriated to the commander-in-chief and is used in the presence of the general, or at the execution of a soldier, as a mark of its being done by his authority. The ordinary guards and outposts are always mounted and relieved by the sound of the tubicen, who also directs the motions of the soldiers on working parties and on field days. The cornicines sound whenever the colours are to be struck or planted. These rules must be punctually observed in all exercises and reviews so that the soldiers may be ready to obey them in action without hesitation according to the general's orders either to charge or halt, to pursue the enemy or to retire. For reason will convince us that what is necessary to be performed in the heat of action should constantly be practised in the leisure of peace. (De Re Militari, Book II)

Like the Greek salpinx the Roman trumpets were not regarded as musical instruments. Among the terms used to describe the tone of the tuba, for instance, were horribilis ('horrible'), terribilis ('terrible'), raucus ('raucous'), rudis ('coarse'), strepens ('noisy') and stridulus ('shrieking'). When sounding their instruments, the tubicines sometimes girded their cheeks with the capistrum ('muzzle') which aulos ('flute') players used to prevent their cheeks from being puffed out unduly.

== Middle East ==
See: Nafir

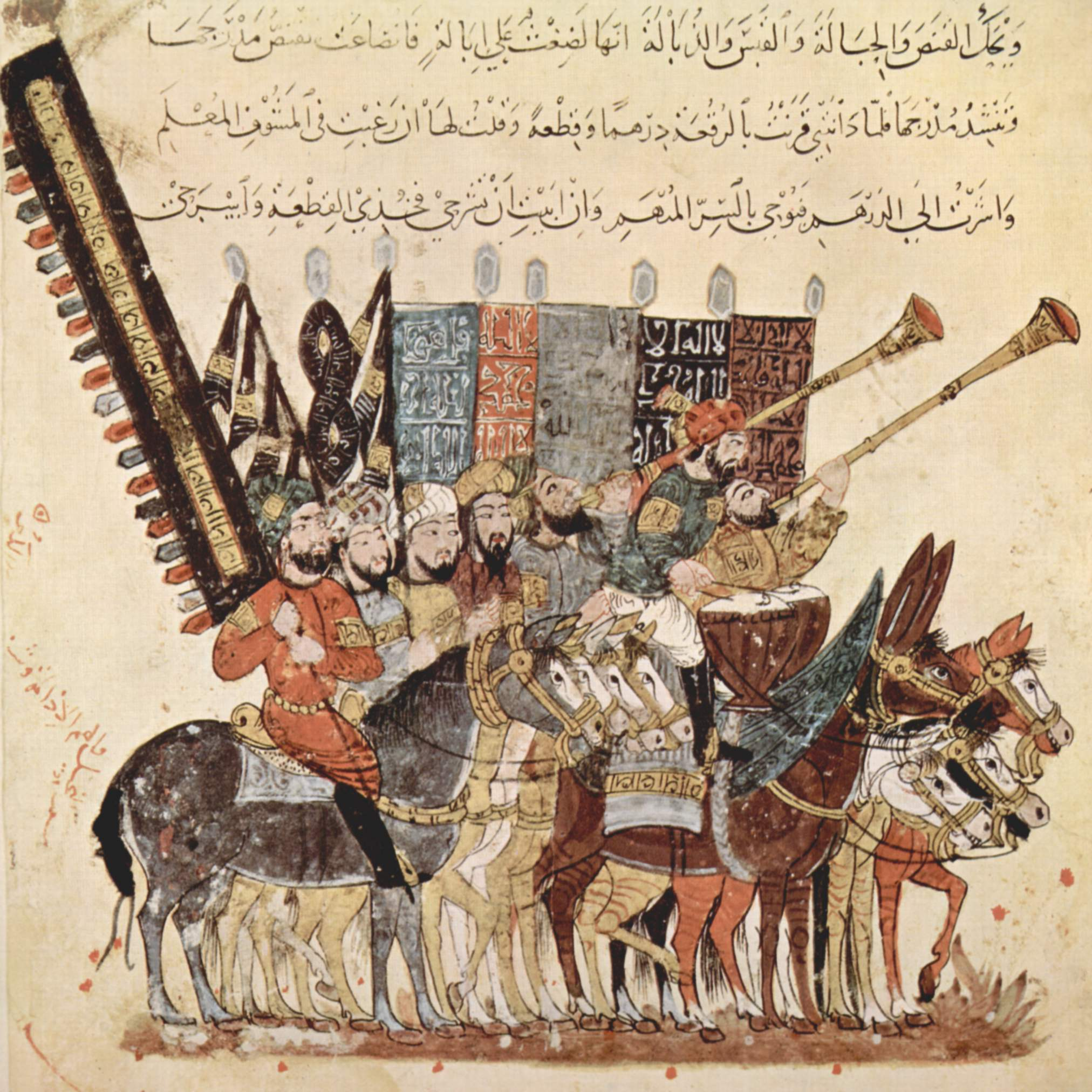
A group of riders with flags, standards and musical instruments, including two long trumpets, nafir. From the 1237 manuscript of Al-Hariri of Basra's Maqamat. (BNF ms. arabe 5847).

After the fall of the Western Empire in 476, the trumpet disappeared from Europe for more than half a millennium. Elsewhere the art of bending long metal tubes was lost, for the trumpets of the succeeding era lacked the characteristic G-like curve of the cornu and buccina. The straight-tubed Roman tuba, however, continued to flourish in the Middle East among the Sassanids and their Arabic successors. The Saracens, whose long metal trumpets greatly impressed the Christian armies at the time of the Crusades, were ultimately responsible for reintroducing the instrument to Europe after a lapse of six hundred years.

During the last centuries of the Roman Empire the name buccina was widely used throughout the Near East to denote a particular type of straight trumpet similar to, and probably derived from, the Roman tuba. From this, undoubtedly, derives the generic term būq, which first occurs after 800; this was the name used by the Arabs to describe a variety of both trumpet-like and horn-like instruments. The būq al-nafīr ("buc[cina] of war") was a long straight metal trumpet used in the military bands of the Abbasid period (750–1258) and thereafter; by the 14th century it could be as much as 2 metres (7 ft) long. From the 11th century, this term was used to denote any long straight trumpet.

Other Arabic words for trumpets of various sizes and shapes include qarnā and sūr; the latter is the name used in the Qur'an for the Last Trump that will announce Judgment Day. The qarnā is thought to be a descendant of the ancient Mesopotamian instrument of the same name.

The Saracens are sometimes said to be the first people to make brass trumpets from hammered sheet, though this is not at all certain.

Many of the long, straight metal trumpets that first appeared around this time were associated with the spread of Islam. In Africa, for example, end-blown metal trumpets are found only in Islamic regions such as Nigeria, Chad and central Cameroon. Known as kakaki (among the Hausa of Nigeria) or gashi (in Chad), these trumpets consist of narrow cylindrical tubes, sometimes over 2 metres (7 ft) in length, with flared metal bells. The silver nafiri is one of only two trumpets found in Malaysia; its name clearly derives from the Arabic būq al-nafīr. Slightly less than 1 metre (3 ft) long, a single nafiri is present in each of the royal nobat ensembles maintained by the local sultans. As in Africa, these royal ensembles play on ceremonial occasions and Islamic holidays.

== Asia ==
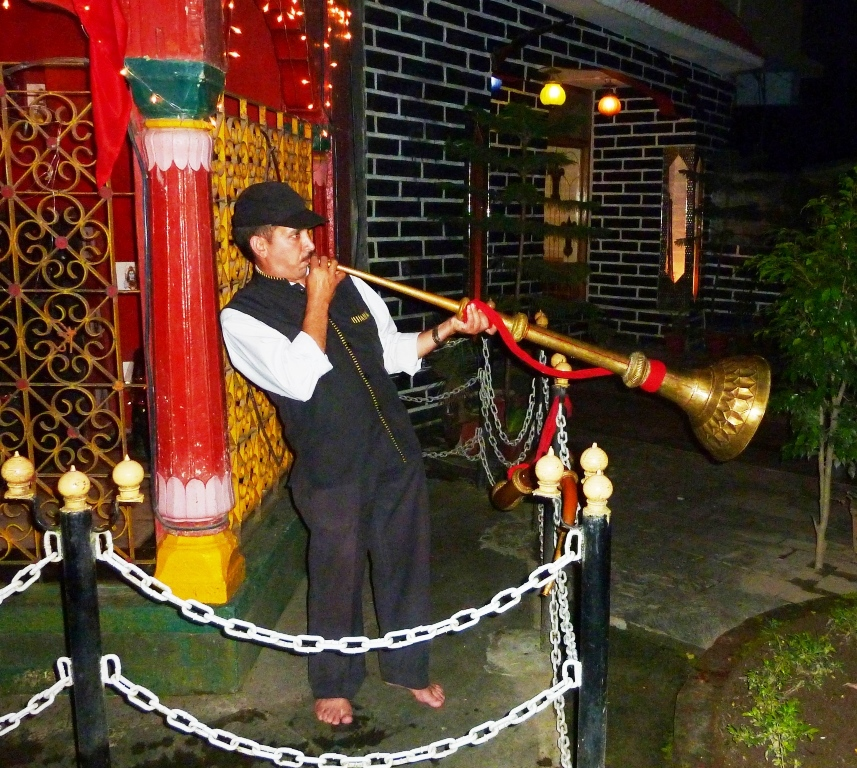
Playing trumpet at Palace Temple. Mandi, Himachal Pradesh, India

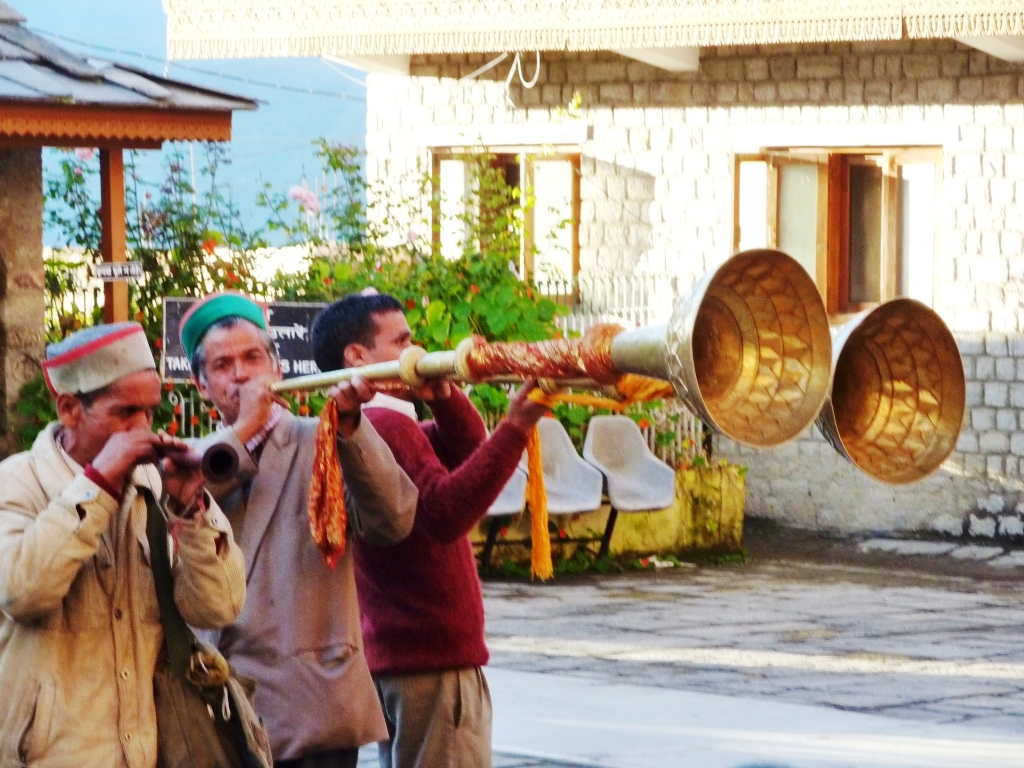
Trumpeters, Royal Palace, Sarahan, HP, India

The dung is the long monastic trumpet of Tibet; it is similar to, and probably derives from, straight trumpets depicted in 13th-century Arabic and Persian manuscripts. The dung is a straight, end-blown trumpet with a conical bore; it is made of copper or brass and has a separate mouthpiece. It varies in length from about 60 cm (24 in) (the medium-sized rag-dun) to as much as 5 m (16 ft) (the telescopic dung-chen). In musical ensembles, two such instruments blown in alternation provide a continuous drone, which is sustained beneath the woodwind and percussion.

The dung-chen can also be found in the northern hills of Laddakh in India and in Bhutan, where it is known by the name thunchen. This ceremonial instrument is used to accompany ritual dances. Nearly 3 metres (10 ft) long, it is made of copper and decorated with silver. The thunchen is generally employed in pairs; the trumpeters, known as thunchen pa, announce the commencement of ceremonies from the gamba, or temple, and also accompany ritual dances. The length and weight of thunchen make it extremely unwieldy; so the flared end is rested on the ground or a special stand, or is supported on the shoulders of another monk.

Possibly related to the Tibetan dung is the tirucinnam, a straight trumpet still found in Tamil Nadu in southern India. Usually a pair of these long, slender instruments are blown together; until a few decades ago it was standard practice for one musician to play both of them simultaneously, which seems to have been the case also in Nepal. A double trumpet of this type is depicted on a relief in Chandi Jawri, Indonesia, dated to 1300. The tirucinnam is about 75 cm (30 in) long and has a wide cylindrical bore; it has a narrow conical bell but no mouthpiece (to facilitate the simultaneous blowing of two instruments).

The Chinese too had a long cylindrical metal trumpet known as haotong (or, in Japanese, dokaku), which may have been related to the foregoing instruments. In place of a bell, the haotong had a long, broad cylinder made of wood, iron or brass, into which the rest of the instrument could be telescoped when not in use; the haotong was played with the bell end resting on the ground. The ordinary Chinese trumpet was the laba (rappa in Japanese). This came from Mongolia, where it was called the rapal. It had a narrow, conical bore and consisted of two or three sections which telescoped into each other. (Chinese sources record the use of trumpets on the battlefield by the Huns, or Xiongnu, in the 3rd and 2nd centuries BCE.)

== See also ==
- Military tattoo

== Notes ==
1. These primitive instruments are now regarded as the common ancestors of most modern brasswind instruments, including the horn, the bugle, the trombone and the tuba.
2. Baines, Anthony. Brass Instruments. Courier Corporation, 1993. pp. 38 ff. et passim.
3. Cyropaedia 3:44 et passim.
4. Bhagavad Gita, Chapter 1, vresin12–19.
5. Roland's legendary trumpet, Olifant, in the 11th-century epic poem The Song of Roland (which is set in the late 8th century) is probably an anachronism.
6. Ezekiel 27:15.
7. Plutarch, Moralia, 5, "On the Worship of Isis and Osiris", Chapter 30 (page 362f). Cf. Aelian, De Natura Animalium, 10.28. See The Trumpet of Tutankhamun Program for a modern recording of one of Tutankhamun's trumpets.
8. This is true if the conventional Egyptian chronology, according to which Tutankhamun died in 1323 BCE, is correct. See the article Egyptian chronology for further discussion.
9. According to some sources this instrument is made of bronze.
10. The Hebrew spelling, הרצצח (Unicode: he resh tsadi tsadi het), is variously transliterated as, hasoserah, hasosra, hassrah, kasoserah, chazozra, chatzotzrah, Chatsots@rah, ħaşoşerah, etc. The correct pronunciation of this and other Biblical terms for "trumpet" are given here.
11. Several Greek and Roman sources credit the Etruscans with the invention of the Greek salpinx as well as the Roman tuba. See, for example, Athenaeus, Deipnosophistes, IV:82; Julius Pollux, Onomasticon, IV:85, 87; Diodorus Siculus, Bibliotheca historia, V:40; Maurus Servius Honoratius, Commentary on Virgil's Aeneid, VIII:516; and Clement of Alexandria, Stromata 1:16.
12. The precise meaning of the various terms tuba, cornu, buccina and lituus is still a matter of dispute. Vegetius makes a clear distinction between the cornu and the buccina; moreover, he refers to the instrument played by the cornicen as an aes curvum, or brass curve, rather than a cornu. Ovid (Metamorphoses, 1:98) refers to aeris cornua, "brass horns". See Meucci (1989) for further details, including the claim that Vegetius originally described the buccina as being made of animal horn rather than metal.
13. This instrument is mentioned, for example, in a letter from St. Jerome to Dardanus, prefect of Gaul.
14. Baibars, the Sultan of Egypt from 1260–1277, numbered twenty trumpeters among the sixty-eight members of his military band. The size of a Saracen's band depended on his rank.
