= Garmr =

Wolf or dog described as a guardian of Hel's gate

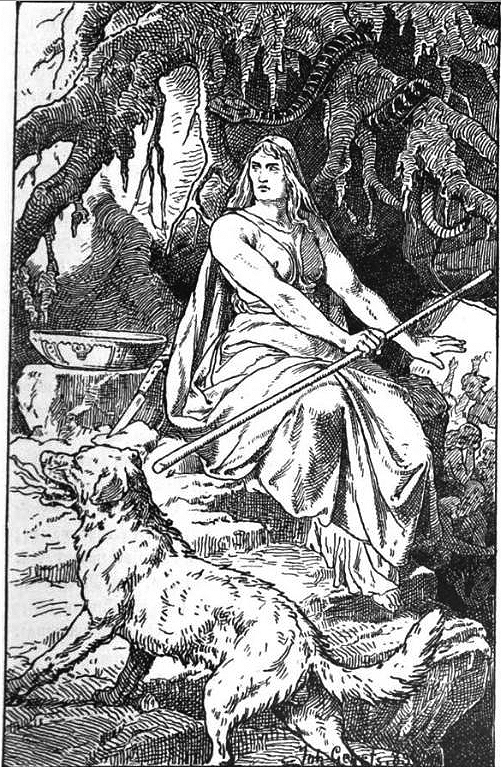
"Hel" (1889) by Johannes Gehrts.

In Norse mythology, Garmr or Garm (Old Norse: Garmr [ˈɡɑrmz̠]) is a wolf or dog associated with both Hel and Ragnarök, and described as a blood-stained guardian of Hel's gate.

== Name ==
The etymology of the name Garmr remains uncertain. Bruce Lincoln brings together Garmr and the Greek mythological dog Cerberus, relating both names to a Proto-Indo-European root *ger- "to growl" (perhaps with the suffixes -*m/*b and -*r). However, Daniel Ogden notes that this analysis actually requires Cerberus and Garmr to be derived from two different Indo-European roots (*ger- and *gher- respectively), and in this opinion does not establish a relationship between the two names.

He also appears in Low Saxon folklore as the helhond or kardoes in Twente, Eastern Netherlands as the companion of Tamfana or Tanfana; one of Hell's/Nerthus's many titles/names.

It's said that his red glowing eyes have been seen around the tankenberg, in Oldenzaal and that his howl indicates illness and death.

Elements within pan-Germanic folklore overlap with the ancient tradition of "'t an bloaz'n" of the "mirreweenterhorn", blowing the midwinter horn, also called a Lur.

It is likely that the eerie sounds of the horn, used to communicate with the spirits of the ancestors, were answered by wolves in the area, and thus the sound became synonymous to winter, illness, death and the veil between life and death being very thin.

The Lur/midwinterhorn was a ritual animistic tool, played to call into the "otherworld", thank the ancestors or to announce and guide the passing of family and members of the community.

== Attestations ==
=== Poetic Edda ===
The Poetic Edda poem Grímnismál mentions Garmr:

The best of trees | must Yggdrasil be,
Skíðblaðnir best of boats;
Of all the gods | is Óðinn the greatest,
And Sleipnir the best of steeds;
Bifröst of bridges, | Bragi of skalds,
Hábrók of hawks, | and Garm of hounds.

One of the refrains of Völuspá uses Garmr's howling to herald the coming of Ragnarök:

Now Garm howls loud | before Gnipahellir,
The fetters will burst, | and the wolf run free;
Much do I know, | and more can see
Of the fate of the gods, | the mighty in fight.

After the first occurrence of this refrain the Fimbulvetr is related; the second occurrence is succeeded by the invasion the world of gods by jötnar; after the last occurrence, the rise of a new and better world is described.

Baldrs draumar describes a journey which Odin makes to Hel. Along the way he meets a dog.

Then Óðinn rose, | the enchanter old,
And the saddle he laid | on Sleipnir's back;
Thence rode he down | to Niflhel deep,
And the hound he met | that came from hell.

Bloody he was | on his breast before,
At the father of magic | he howled from afar;
Forward rode Óðinn, | the earth resounded
Till the house so high | of Hel he reached.

Although unnamed, this dog is sometimes assumed to be Garmr. Alternatively, Garmr is sometimes assumed to be identical to Fenrir. Garmr is sometimes seen as a hellhound, comparable to Cerberus.

=== Prose Edda ===
The Prose Edda book Gylfaginning assigns him a role in Ragnarök:

Then shall the dog Garmr be loosed, which is bound before Gnipahellir: he shall do battle with Týr, and each become the other's slayer.

== In popular culture ==
Garmr is the namesake and emblem of the protagonist's squadron, Galm Team, in the combat flight simulation game Ace Combat Zero: The Belkan War. The name "Galm" is a mistransliteration of "Garmr" into English due to the singular liquid phoneme in the Japanese language.

Garmr appears as a boss fight in the 2003 video game Boktai: The Sun Is in Your Hand, 2017's Hellblade: Senua's Sacrifice and 2022's God of War Ragnarök.

In episode 12 of the anime The Most Notorious "Talker" Runs the World's Greatest Clan, the new group Wild Tempest must fight in the Quartz Valley against Garmr, who is a rank 9 beastly dog. This version of Garmr is intelligent, can speak, has 3 tails, 3 pairs of eyes, and has an open chest.

In the 2026 video game, Resident Evil: Requiem, the giant mutant zombie dogs that pursue Leon S. Kennedy through the ruins of Raccoon City are dubbed the Garmr, which serve as the game's newest variant of the Cerberus zombie dogs of previous titles.

== See also ==
- Hellhound
- List of wolves
