= Birch trumpet =

Natural trumpet made of spruce covered with birch bark

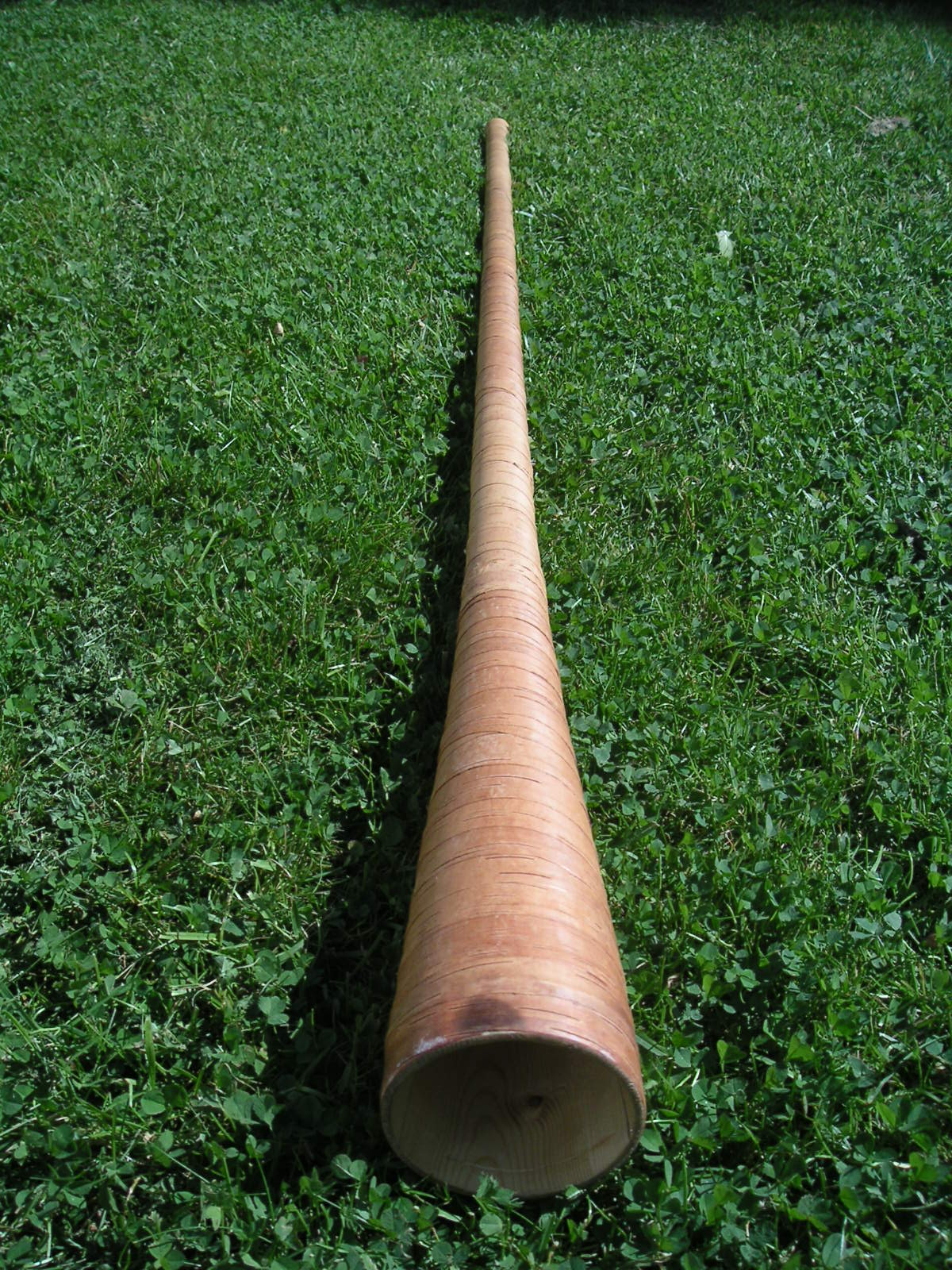
Neverlur

Birch trumpets in Luostarinmäki Handicrafts Museum

The birch trumpet (Norwegian: neverlur, Swedish: näverlur, Latvian: tās̆u taure, Lithuanian: ragas, daudytė, Finnish: tuohitorvi, Estonian: karjapasun) is a type of natural trumpet made of spruce covered with birch bark, known in Norway, Sweden, Finland, England, Denmark, Latvia, Lithuania, Belarus and Estonia. Even cruder and less durable versions were made of plain birch bark. They are associated with the early European Chalet culture, where it was presumably used to intimidate predators, frighten supernatural enemies, and convene council meetings.

Usually, the birch trumpet is a natural horn, having no fingerholes or valves. Normally, a player can play 10 tones from the natural scale on the instrument. In the modern era, the birch trumpet is primarily a cultural curiosity, used for the occasional fanfare.

In Finland, the birch trumpet, locally known as the tuohitorvi, comes in different varieties. Some instruments are built as natural horns and used for signalling, usually by shepherds, whereas others are built in the style of the mute cornett and have fingerholes for melody playing.

Tolga kulturskole (culture school) in Norway regularly teaches playing the birch trumpet to all interested people living in Tolga Municipality.

The oldest recovered birch trumpet in Sweden dates back to the 10th century, and resembles earlier bronze trumpets.

== Contemporary manufacturers ==
=== Norway ===
- Magnar Storbækken at the company Naturinstrumenter in Tolga Municipality

=== Sweden ===
- Rune Selén was Sweden's best known birch trumpet manufacturer. He manufactured more than 11,000 birch trumpets between 1959 and 2005, when he retired because of dust allergy. He died on 28 October 2011.
- Lisa Byers Runberg in Alunda. She was taught by Rune Selén. Her husband Per Runberg is a folk musician and riksspelman.
- Jan Nordkvist at the company Lurmakaren in Tällberg

== Similar and related instruments ==
- With length up to 4–5 meters are known from the Alps (alphorn), Carpathian Mountains, and Pyrenees.
- Midwinter horn mainly known from the border area between Germany and Netherlands in Bentheim and Twente. It is only played in the period between Advent Sunday and Epiphany
- Büchel (Switzerland)
- Ligawka (Poland)
- Karjapasun (Estonia)
- Bucium (Romania)
- Rozhok (Russia)
- Trembita (Galicia)

== Gallery ==
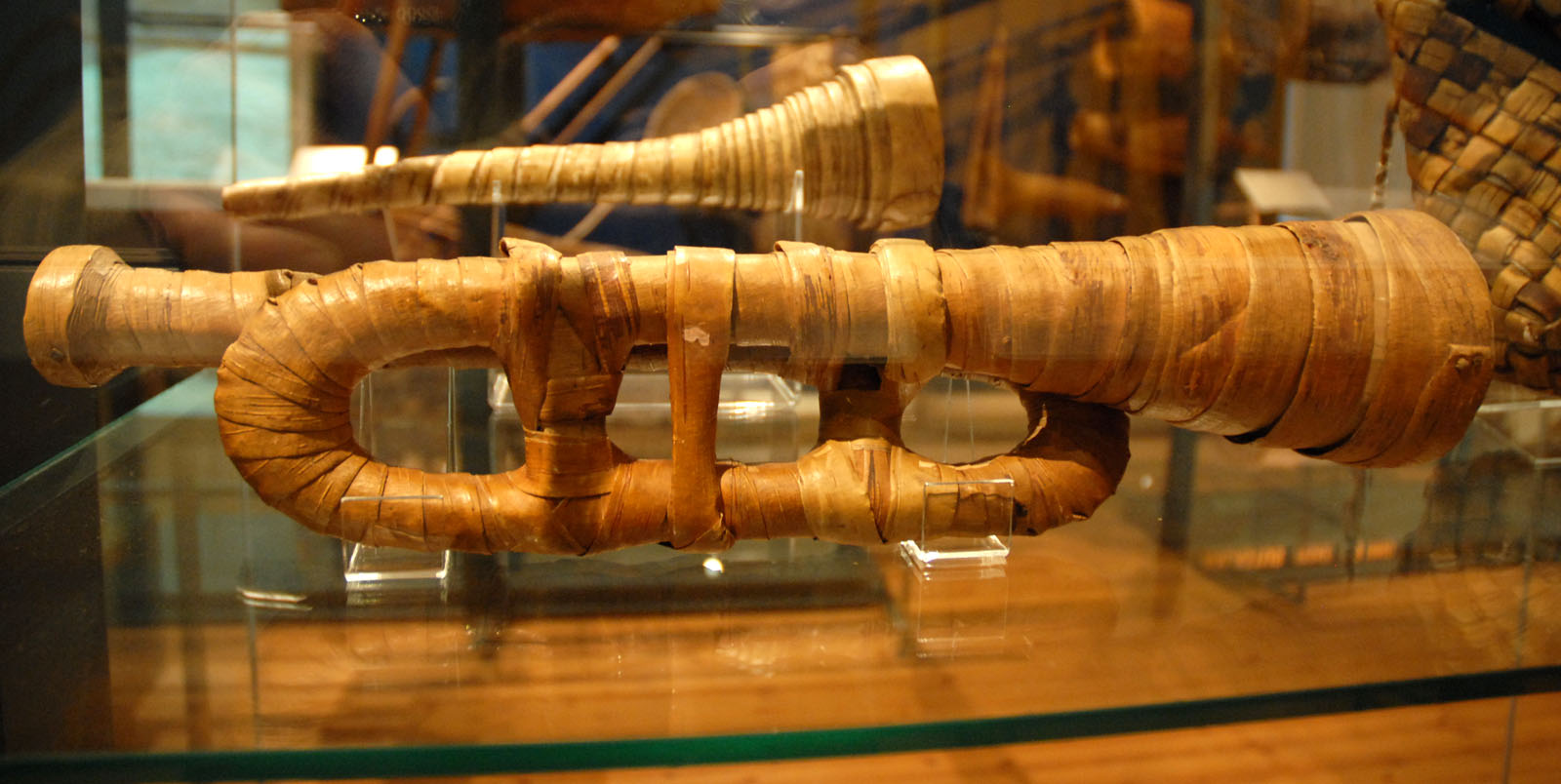
Two tuohitorvi in the Finnish National Museum, with the one in front being modelled after a brass bugle

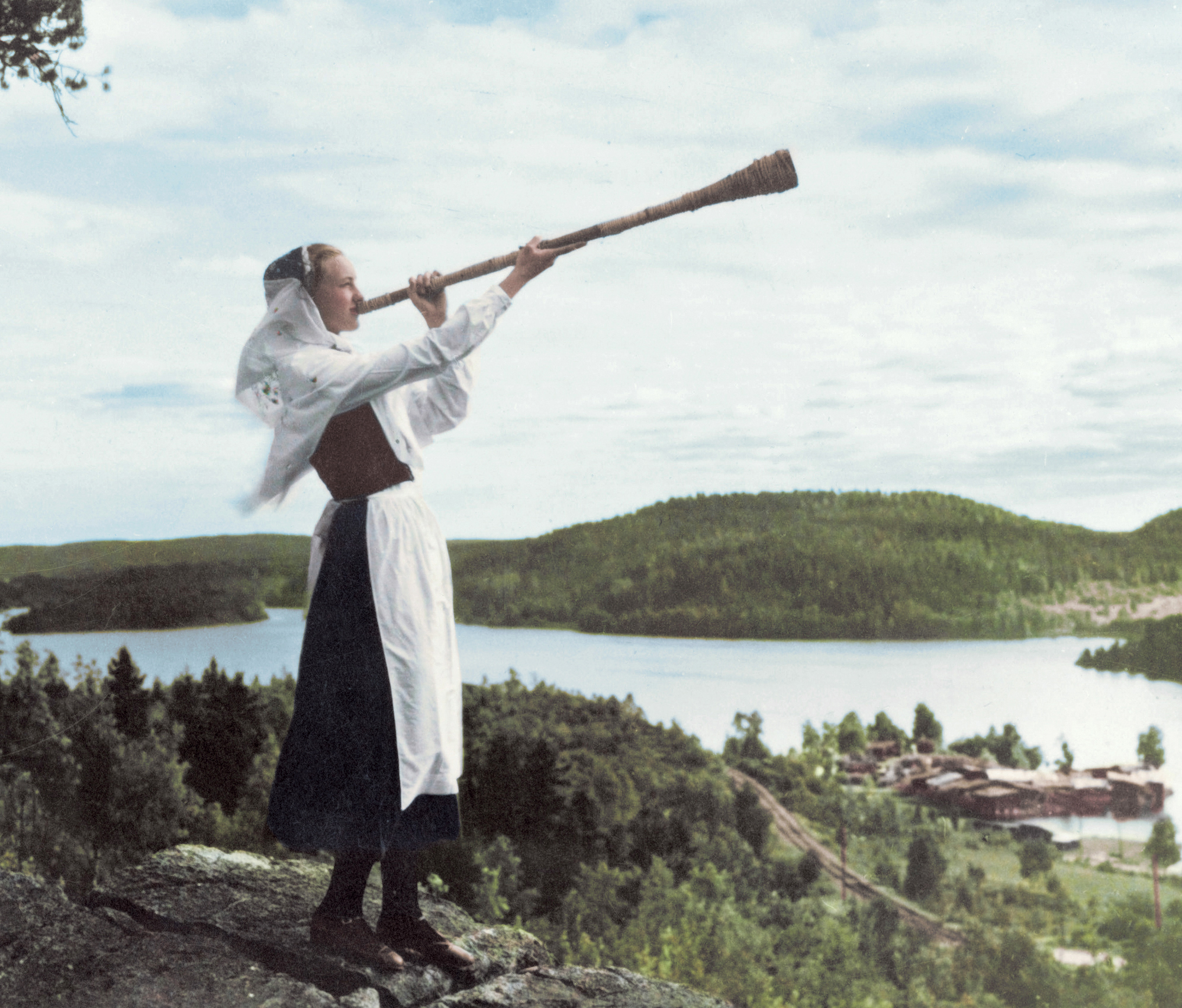
Swedish birch trumpet

Two birch trumpets in the coat of arms of Pielavesi

== See also ==
- Lur
