= Trembita =

Alpine horn (musical instrument)

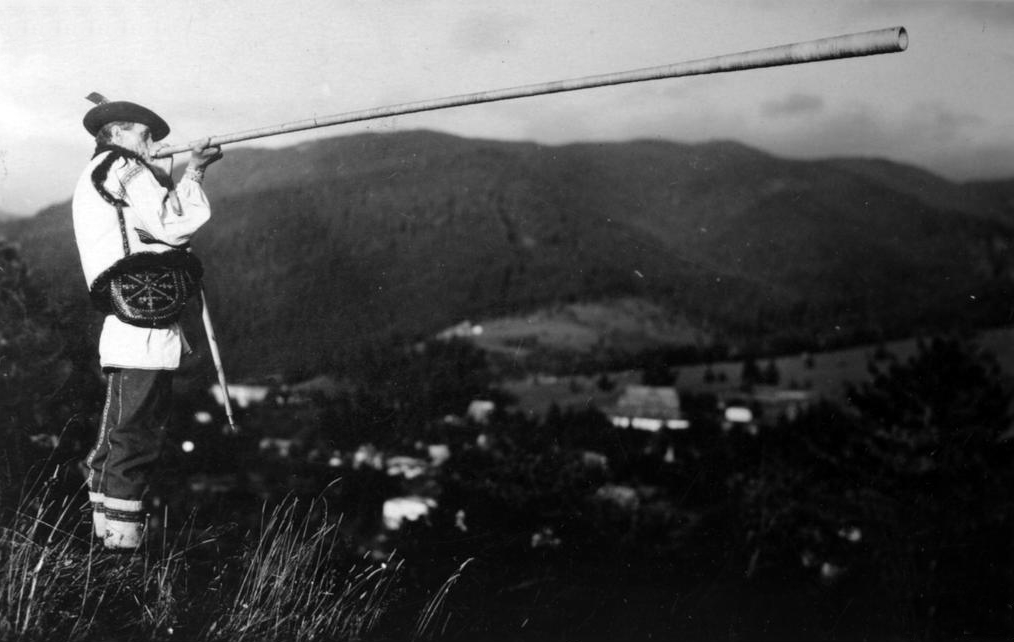
- A Galician highlander playing the trembita
- Classification: Aerophone
- Hornbostel–Sachs classification: 423.121-12

Playing range
- c^{1}-g^{4}

Related instruments
- Alpine horn; Bucium; Cossack horn; Alphorn

The trembita (from the old Germanic trumba, "to trumpet", in Ukrainian трембíта) is a type of an alpine horn made of wood. It is common among Galicians highlanders Hutsuls who live in western Ukraine (Galicia), eastern Poland, Slovakia, and northern Romania. In Poland it is known as a trombita (in the south), a bazuna (in the north), or a ligawka (in central Poland). Trembita is also one of the Galician folk musical instruments.

== Etymology ==
The word "trembita" is believed to be derived from Romanian trîmbiță. In the Romanian language itself, it is probably a Slavicism - from Proto-Slavic *trǫbica < *trǫba (in Ukrainian труба).

The variant "trombita" is apparently borrowed from Hungarian trombita, where it comes from Italian trombetta.

== Description ==
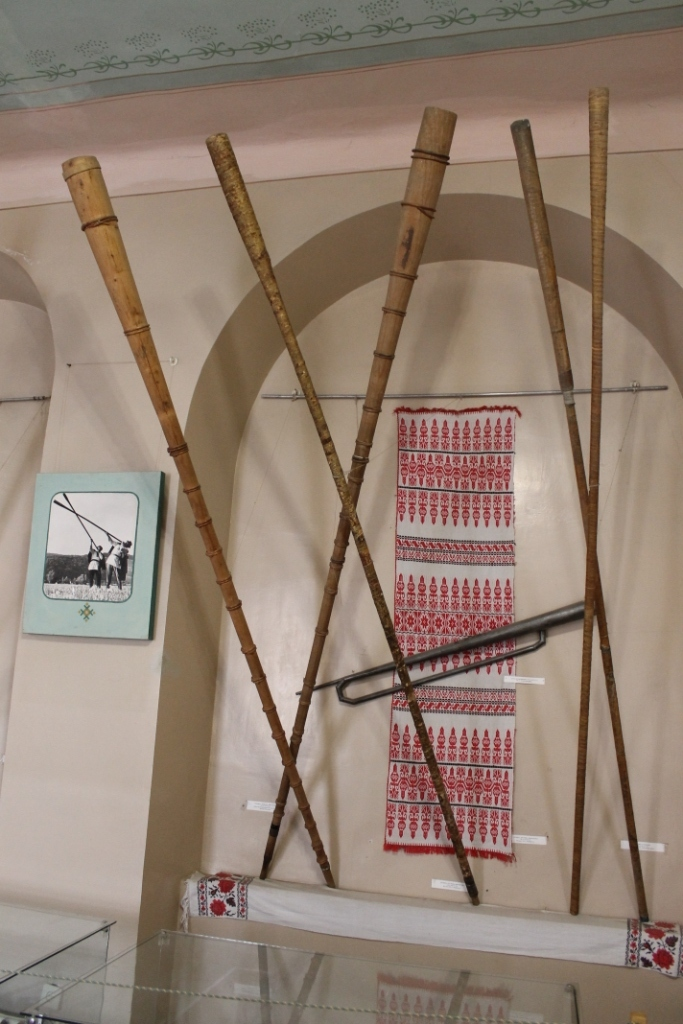
Five trembitas in a museum

A trembita was used primarily by mountain dwellers known as Hutsuls and Gorals in the Carpathians, it was used as a signaling device to announce deaths, funerals, weddings.

The tube is made from a long straight piece of pine or spruce (preferably one that has been struck by lightning) which is split in two in order to carve out the core. The halves are once again joined together and then wrapped in birch bark or osier rings. It is also used by shepherds for signaling and communication in the forested mountains and for guiding sheep and dogs. The trembita has a timbre that is much brighter than that of the alpenhorn due to its narrow bore and very minor flare.

The trembita has no lateral openings and therefore gives the pure natural harmonic series of the open pipe. The upper harmonics are the more readily obtained by reason of the small diameter of the bore in relation to the length.

The notes of the natural harmonic series overlap, but do not exactly correspond, to notes found in the familiar chromatic scale in standard Western equal temperament. Most prominently within the trembita's range, the 7th and 11th harmonics are particularly noticeable because they fall between adjacent notes in the chromatic scale.

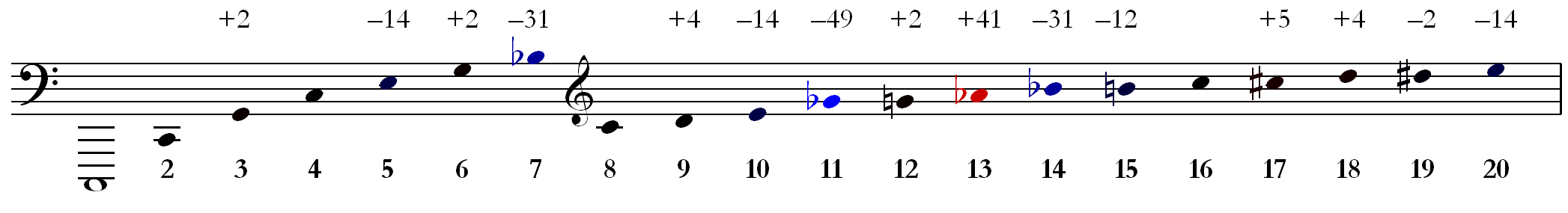

In the hands of a skilled composer or arranger, the natural harmonics can be used to haunting melancholy effect or, by contrast, to create a charming pastoral flavor.

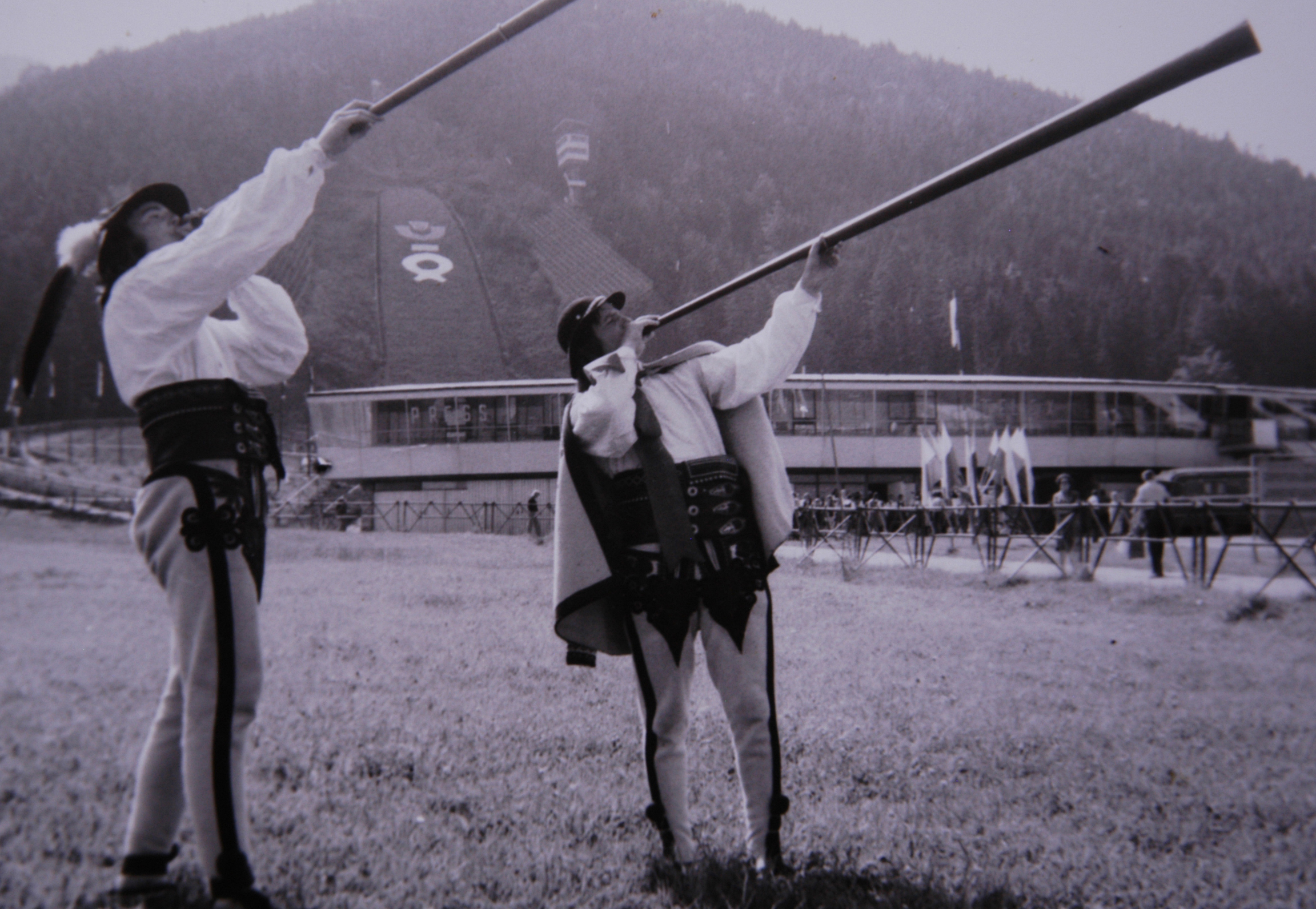
Podhale highlanders, Poland, playing trombitas.

== Modern use ==
The trembita is often used in Galician ethnographic ensembles and as an episodic instrument in the Galician folk instrument orchestra.

The trembita was shown on 2004 Eurovision Song Contest by the Ukrainian winner of the contest Ruslana during her performance of the song "Wild Dances".

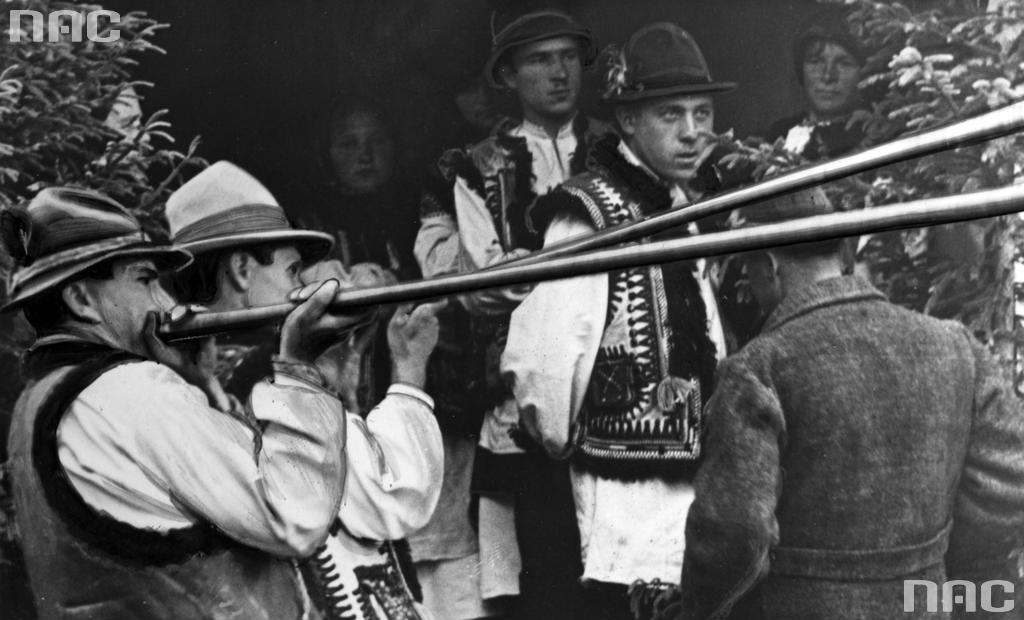
Hutsuls playing trembitas

It is also used by Ukrainian band ONUKA.

The longest trembita (8.35 m) was made by Polish folk musician Józef Chmiel, located in the Czech Republic.

== Similar instruments ==
- Alphorn, used by mountain dwellers in Switzerland and elsewhere
- Erke, a similar instrument of the Argentine Northwest
- Birch trumpet, a similar instrument used in Norway, Sweden and the Baltic region
- Lur, native Scandinavian term for Birch trumpet
- Trâmbiță or Bucium, a type of alphorn used by mountain dwellers and by shepherds in Romania and Moldova

== See also ==
- Polish folk music
- Romanian folk music
- Slovak folk music

== Sources ==
- Humeniuk, A (1967). Ukrainski narodni muzychni instrumenty. Kiev: Naukova dumka.
- Mizynec, Victor (1987). Folk instruments of Ukraine. Doncaster: Bayda Books. ISBN 0-908480-19-9. OCLC 19355447.
- Cherkasky, Leonid Musiiovych (2003). Ukrainski narodni muzychni instrumenty. Kiev: Tekhnika. ISBN 966-575-111-5. OCLC 56112444.
- Demonstration of trembita performance
- Mr Plyushko explains about trembita to students (in Ukrainian)
- Christmas call by trembitas
