= Gnipahellir =

Mythical cave in Norse mythology

Gnipahellir (Gnipa cave) is a cave in Norse mythology. Gnipahellir is the home of Garmr, the hellhound who guards the gates of Hel, the Norse realm of the dead. Garmr is often featured chained here until the onset of Ragnarök, at which time his bindings break and he runs free. Reference to Gnipahellir appears in Vǫluspá, Prophecy of the Völva, one of the poems of the Poetic Edda.

Now Garm howls loud before Gnipahellir, The fetters will burst and the wolf run free

— Völuspá, verse 44

== Other sources ==
- Brodeur, Arthur Gilchrist (1916) Snorri Sturluson's The Prose Edda (The American-Scandinavian Foundation, CreateSpace Independent Publishing. 2011) ISBN 978-1461087892
- Lincoln, Bruce (1991) Death, War, and Sacrifice: Studies in Ideology and Practice (University of Chicago Press) ISBN 0-226-48199-9.
- Orchard, Andy (1997) Dictionary of Norse Myth and Legend (Cassell) ISBN 0-304-34520-2
- Simek, Rudolf (1996) Dictionary of Northern Mythology (translated by Angela Hall. first published by Alfred Kröner Verlag in 1984. Cambridge: D. S. Brewer)ISBN 0-85991-513-1
