= Russian horn orchestra =

Historical Russian music

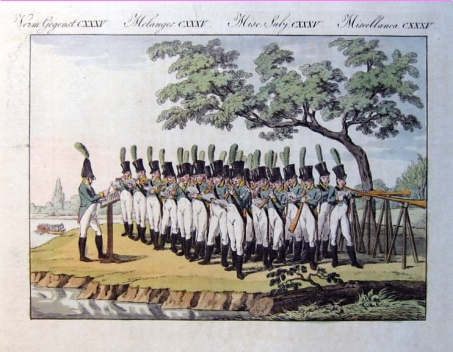
Colored engraving of an orchestra with more than 20 horn players. Early 19th century.

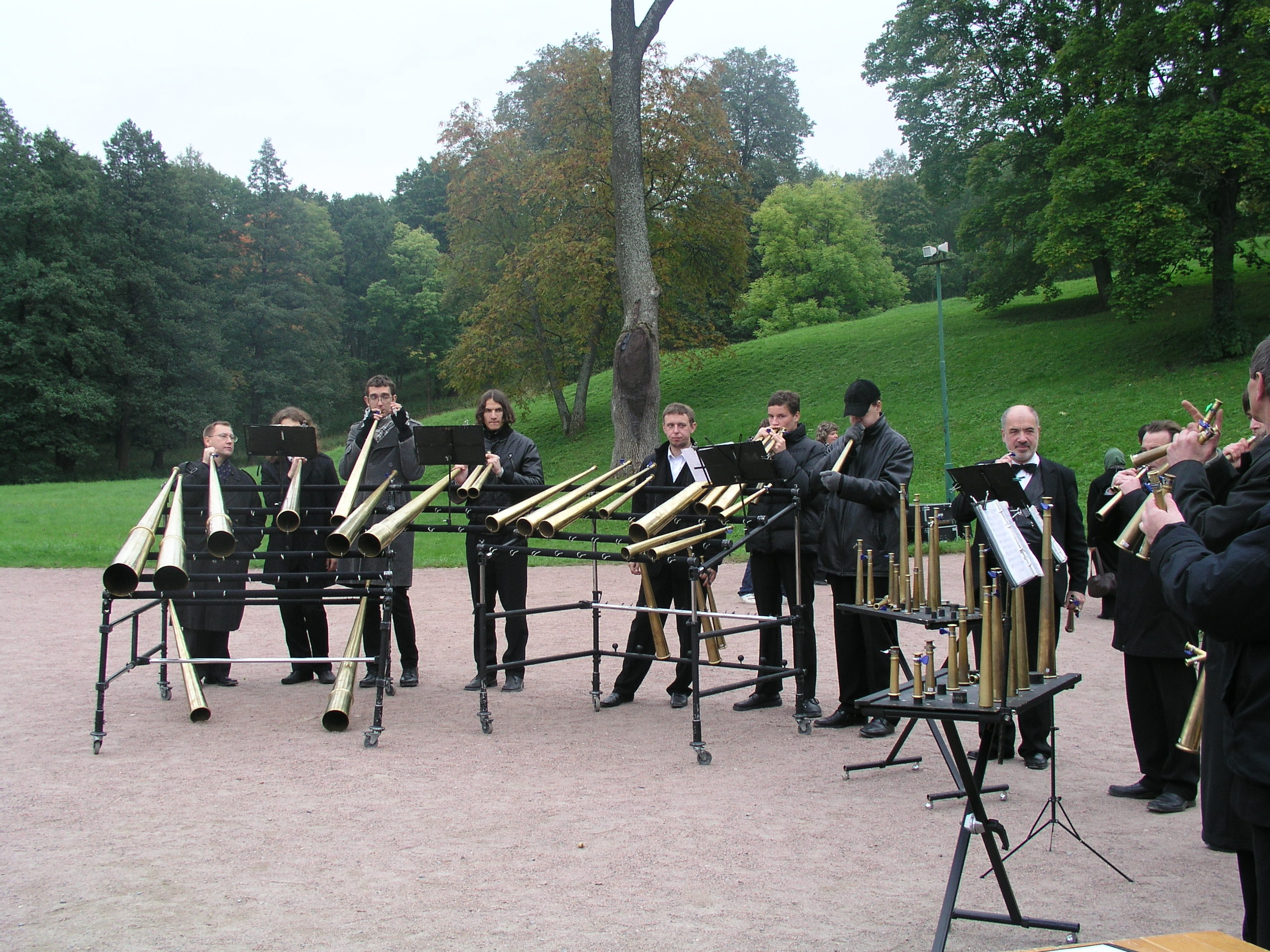
Modern version. St. Petersburg, 2008.

The Russian horn orchestra flourished as a distinct music genre in 18th and 19th century Russia. It was a coordinated performance using hunting horns known as Rozhoks, each of which could produce only one specific sound.

According to the treatise On Man, His Mortality, His Immortality (1790) of Alexander Radishchev, the inventor of this music genre was Oberjägermeister Dmitry Naryshkin (1764—1838), the husband of Maria Naryshkina. Radishchev elucidates the primitive nature of individual instruments while likening the collective effect to that of a church organ. Besides, a specific feature of such music is that it sounds cacophonic up close and can only be listened to from a certain distance. Within his philosophical context, the author uses the fact to illustrate the idea that the whole transcends the sum of its parts.

The orchestra was also mentioned by the German philosopher Arthur Schopenhauer in Parerga and Paralipomena (1851). He also uses the metaphor of the Russian horn orchestra, apparently known in his era in Western Europe, too, to illuminate his philosophical thoughts. According to Schopenhauer, the mediocre man is like such a horn and it is because of his inferiority that he seeks solace in social companionship.

== See also ==
- Blowing horn
- Bukkehorn
- Hunting-horn
- Shofar
- Swedish cowhorn
- Vuvuzela
