= Brudevælte Lurs =

Coordinates: 55.855556°N 12.287778°E

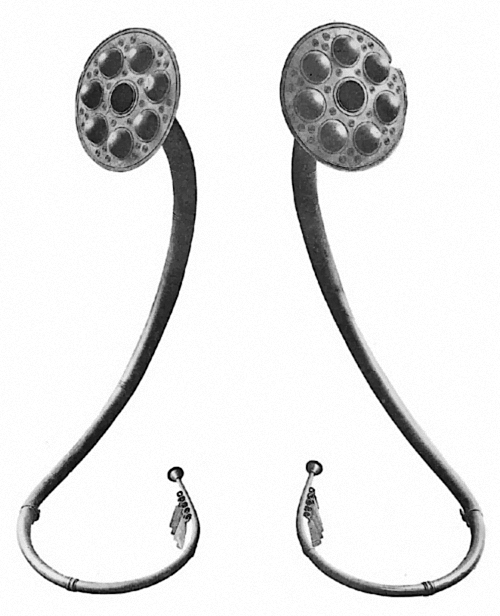
- Material: Bronze
- Size: length: 1.5 - 2.2 meters
- Created: c. 800 – c. 700 BC
- Discovered: 1797; Lynge, Capital, Denmark
- Discovered by: Ole Pedersen

The Brudevælte Lurs, found in a bog north of Lynge on the Danish island of Zealand, are six lurs, which are so well preserved that they can still be played. They date from the Nordic Bronze Age.

== History ==
The three pairs of lurs were found by a farmer named Ole Pedersen in 1797 in a turf grave in a bog which has since been drained. It was the first hoard of Lurs ever discovered, and also the largest and most important.

== Description ==
The length of the Lurs ranges between 1.5 and 2.2 metres. Tuned differently from one another, they were made around 800-700 BC. The Danish archaeologist Christian Jürgensen Thomsen was the first to refer to the bronze instruments with the Old Norse word luðr; before that they were referred to as "horns".

Most lurs are found as hoards. That they had great cultural significance is indicated by hoards with a cultic context and by the frequent depiction of Lur-players on Scandinavian Bronze Age rock art. In these depictions the lur-players are usually depicted as pairs and, as a rule, lurs are found in pairs. These pairs are always tuned to the same tone. The tone sequence is based on just intonation; a good player can produce a wide tonal range. The sound of the lurs is powerful and piercing, similar to the Wagner Tuba.

The lurs consist of an S-shaped pipe made of several pieces that have been welded together, a sound-board at the upper end and a mouthpiece at the lower end. The lurs were cast from bronze with a level of craftsmanship so high that it is still not entirely clear to modern scholars how they achieved such perfection with the quality of casting technology available to them.

== Exhibition ==
Five of the Brudevælte lurs are found in the National Museum of Denmark in Copenhagen. The sixth was given to the Russian Tsar Nicholas I in 1845.
