= Tochacatl =

Musical instrument

El tochacatl, tochácatl, toxacatl o toxácatl is a group of aerophone instruments, of Mexican origin, whose main characteristics are being aspired instead of blown and do not have conical but tube mouthpieces. Prehispanic tochacatl was a straight, long rod. Afterwards, different forms and materials were adapted to the instrument.
