= Salpinx =

Ancient Greek trumpet-like instrument

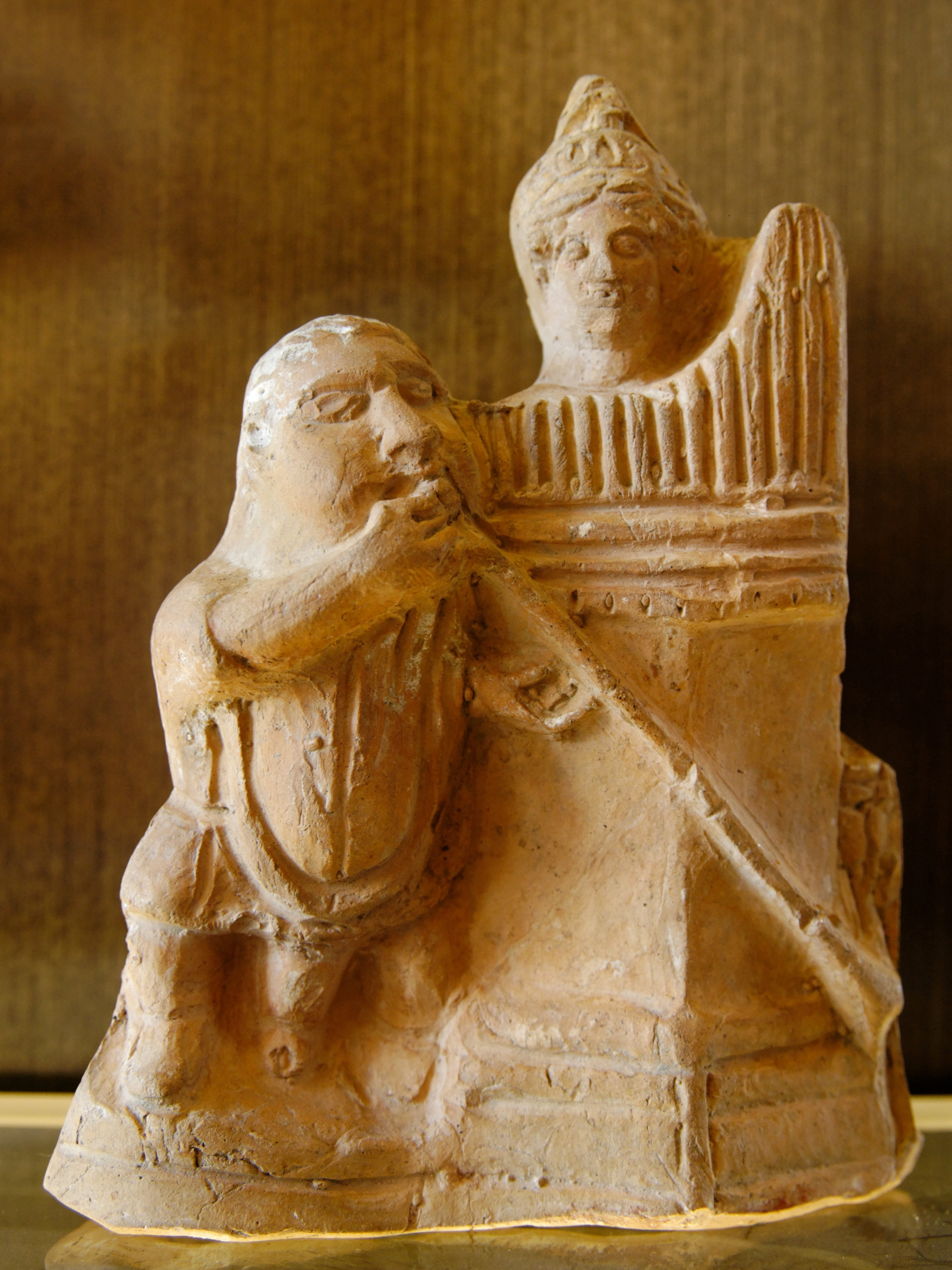
Musicians playing the salpinx (trumpet) and the hydraulis (water organ). Terracotta figurine made in Alexandria, 1st century BC

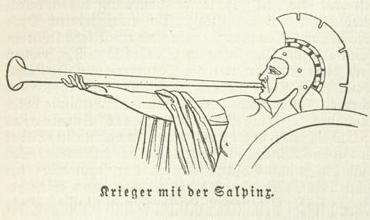
Greek warrior blowing a salpinx

A salpinx (/ˈsælpɪŋks/; plural salpinges /sælˈpɪndʒiːz/; Greek σάλπιγξ) was a trumpet-like instrument of the ancient Greeks that was used as a tactical signal on the battle field, as well as to signal the beginnings of gatherings, or of races in sport.

== Construction ==
The salpinx consisted of a straight, narrow bronze tube with a mouthpiece of bone and a bell (also constructed of bronze) of variable shape and size; extant descriptions describe conical, bulb-like, and spherical structures. Each type of bell may have had a unique effect on the sound made by the instrument. The instrument has been depicted in some classical era vases as employing the use of a phorbeia: a leather strap typically worn on the face of aulos players to support their embouchure and allow for the projection of a strong sound. Because of this, there is some debate about whether there was a version of the salpinx that involved the use of a reed, however it is unlikely as the mouthpiece was made of a solid material (bone), and a cane reed would not have been able to withstand the vast amount of air pressure a lip reed can undergo to generate a sound resonant enough to be heard on the battlefield. The salpinx was akin to a shorter version of the approximately 1.5 meter long Roman tuba. As noted by Anthony Baines in Brass Instruments: Their History and Development, there is no existing fully attested Greek salpinx. However, Boston’s Museum of Fine Arts houses a type of salpinx attributed to the Hellenistic period or the Roman Imperial period, that was supposedly found in Olympia. It is unique in that it is constructed from thirteen sections of bone, connected using tenons and sockets (with bronze ferrules) rather than the long, bronze tube described elsewhere. This salpinx is over 1.57 m long dwarfing the common salpinx, which is estimated to have been around 0.8 – 1.20 m long.

== Origin ==
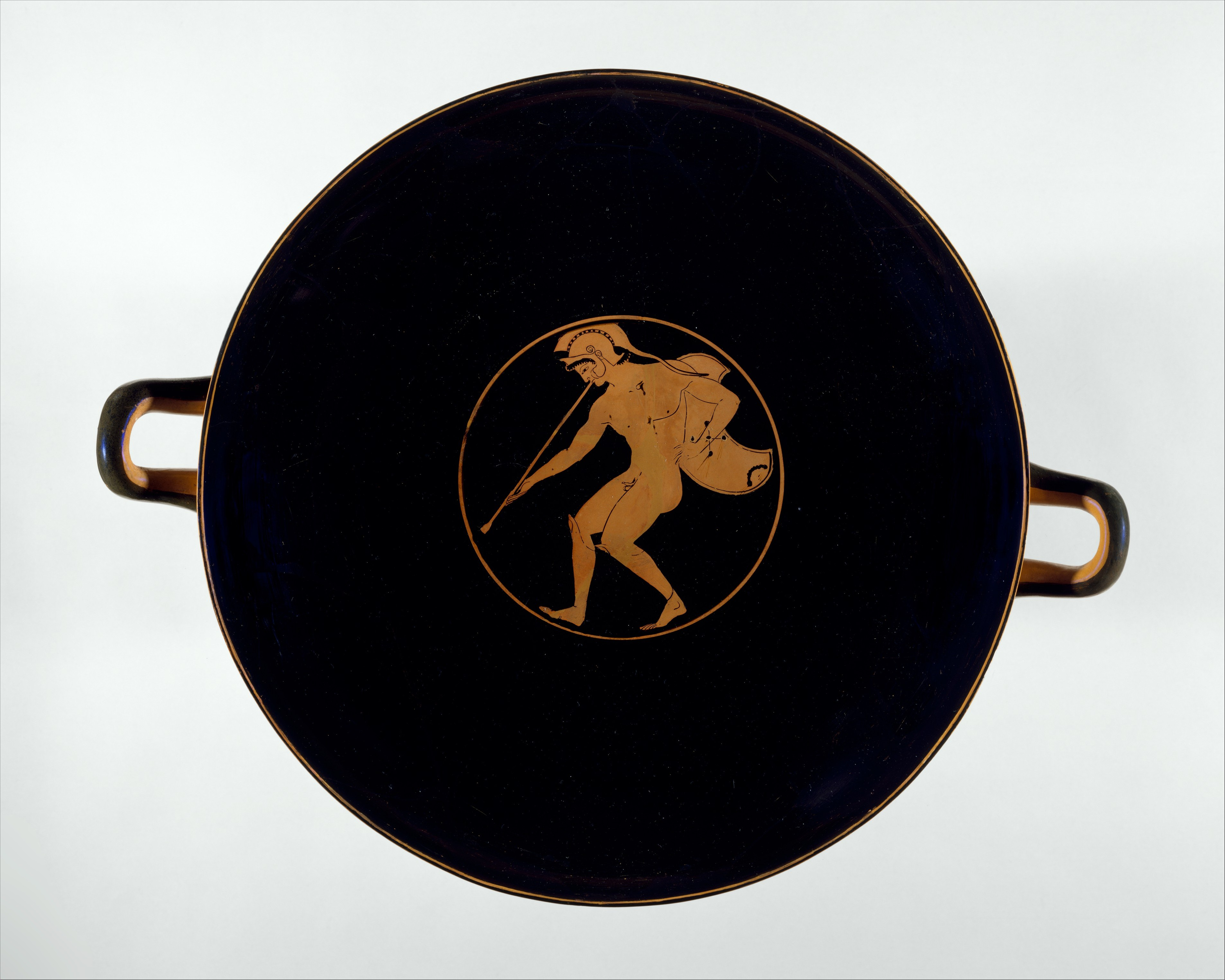
Greek drinking bowl, circa 500 B.C., showing a warrior sounding a salpinx

The trumpet is found in many early civilizations and therefore makes it difficult to discern when and where the long, straight trumpet design found in the salpinx originated. References to the salpinx are found frequently in Greek literature and art. Early descriptions of the sound of the salpinx can be found in Homer’s Iliad (9th or 8th century BC), however, this Archaic reference is exceptional and frequent references are not found until the Classical period. Similar instruments can be found in Anatolia, Mesopotamia, and Egypt, though the salpinx is most closely related to the Egyptian version. References to the salpinx in classical literature include mention of the instrument as tyrrhene a derivative of Tyrrhenoi, an exonym often employed by the Greeks as an allusion to the Etruscan people. Bronze instruments were important among the Etruscans and as a people they were held in high regard by the Greeks for their musical contributions. The salpinx as an Etruscan invention is thus supported by the Greeks and various descriptions can be found among the authors Aeschylus, Pollux, and Sophocles. It is likely that the salpinx was introduced to the Greeks in some way through the Etruscans, however, scattered references to the salpinx prior to Greek contact with the Etruscans, as well as the myriad salpinx type instruments described by Eustathius of Thessalonica, suggests some small level of uncertainty in regard to whether or not the instrument came to the Greeks directly from the Etruscans or through some intermediary source.

== Uses ==
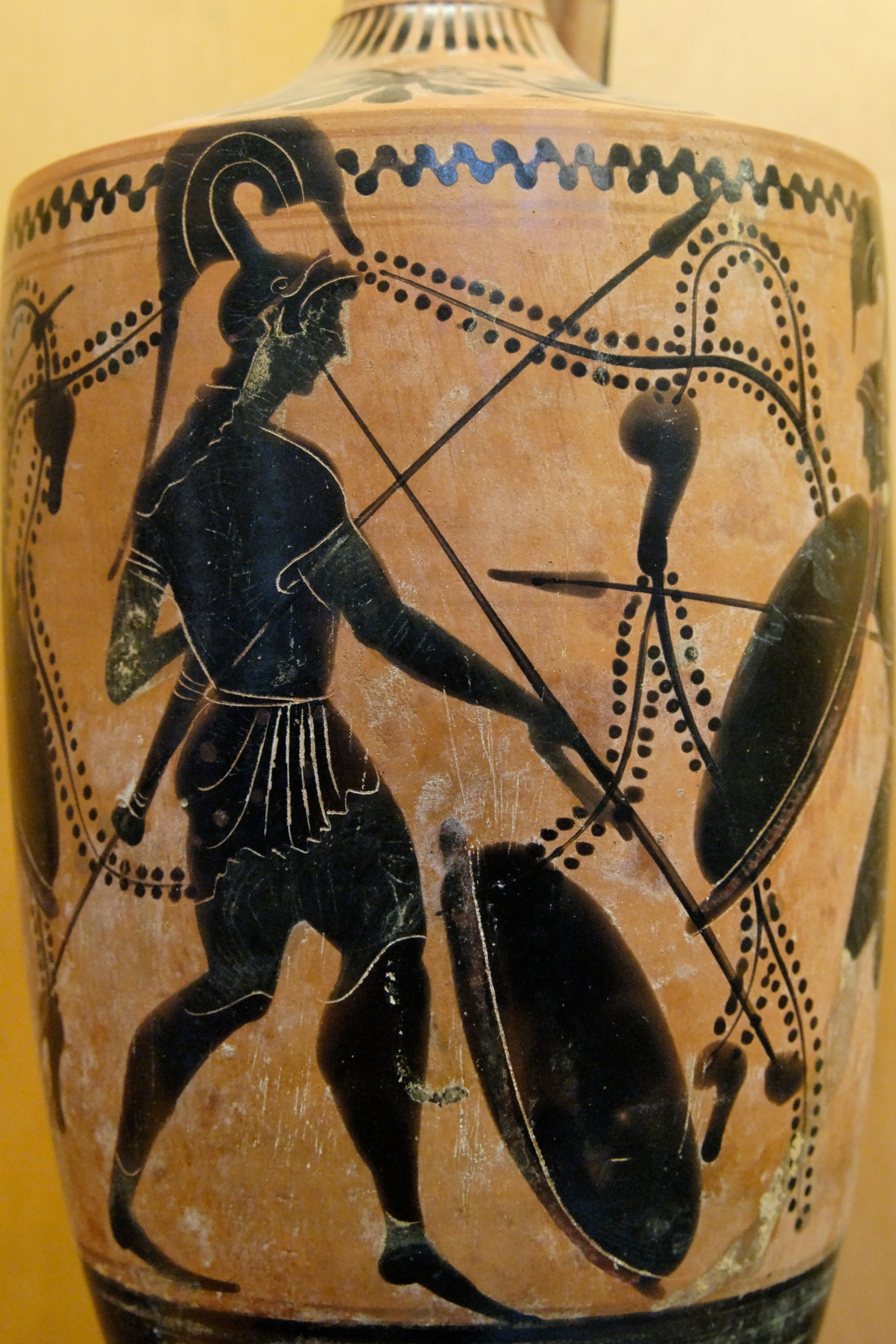
Late 6th, early 5th century BC. Vase depicting a soldier playing the salpinx

When encountered in Greek art and literature, the salpinx is usually depicted as being played by a soldier. Fifth century authors frequently associated its "piercing sound" with war; the instrument often being used for signalling, summoning crowds and beginning chariot races. This is supported in the writing of Aristotle who, in De audibilibus, explained that salpinges were used as "...instruments of summons in war, at the games, and so on, not to make music." Aristides Quintilianus described the necessity of the salpinx and salpingtis (a player of the salpinx) in battle in his treatise, On Music. He explains that each command to troops was given using specific tones or "melodies" played on the salpinx. This action allowed for an entire army to receive a command at once as well as provide a level of secrecy as these salpinx calls were specific to a group and would be unknown to an opponent. Yet despite its distinctive sound, the shrill blasts of the salpinx would have had a difficult time overcoming the clashing of metal, the cries of the wounded, the roars of aggression from rows of soldiers. This is why the salpinx was primarily used before battle to summon men to prepare for battle and to sound the charge.

Andrew Barker, however, describes a possible exception to the utilitarian usage of the salpinx referencing Aristotle, who wrote, "...that is why everyone, when engaging in revelry, relaxes the tension of the breath in playing the salpinx, so as to make the sound as gentle as possible." It is suggested here that the salpinx may have found use in festive occasions as well as war. This notion is corroborated by Nikos Xanthoulis in his article "The Salpinx in Greek Antiquity". Here, he draws particular attention to Aristotle's statement that "...participants of a komos unbend the tension of the exhaling air in the salpinx, in order to make the sound smoother." The komos, a street festival with music and dance, would require an "unbending of tension" in order to create a more pleasing tone thus indicating a usage for the instrument outside of the military. Another more universal function of the salpinx was to use it as a means of bringing silence to a rambunctious crowd or at a large gathering. This was both useful in a societal setting in places such as large assemblies and as a tool to quiet soldiers while a general addressed his men.

=== Sound ===
The harmonic range of the salpinx was probably only the first few notes of the harmonic series, due to the length and structure of the instrument. The full range was not demonstrated on the battlefield: Because their goal was to create a loud, piercing sound that could be heard far and wide, salpinktes may have just blown one or two notes as hard as possible.

=== Notable Players ===
Herodorus of Megara: A late 4th century salpinktes, described as a man with strong lungs and a very healthy appetite, who stood over 7 ft tall. He is said to have slept on bear skin and could play two salpinges at once. He was able to produce sound so loud it would dissuade anyone within his vicinity, and it aided in Demetrius I Poliorcetes’s conquest of Argos.

Epistades: A salpinktes from the 4th century BCE that Pollux described as being audible from around 8.9 km away.

Aglaisi Megakleous: A 3rd century BCE female salpinx player who had a healthy appetite. She wore a helmet while playing at the first great procession in the city of Alexandria.

Archias of Yvla: A salpinx player from the classical period, who was celebrated for his astonishing ability to project his sound without any sort of amplifier, alongside winning three Olympic trumpet competitions and the Pythian games.

=== Modern ===
The sound of the salpinx was being digitally recreated by the Ancient Instruments Sound/Timbre Reconstruction Application (ASTRA) project which uses physical modeling synthesis to simulate the sound of the salpinx. Due to the complexity of this process, the ASTRA project uses grid computing on hundreds of computers throughout Europe to model the sounds.

The Salpinx is part of the Lost Sounds Orchestra, alongside other ancient instruments whose sounds have been recreated by ASTRA, including the epigonion, the aulos, the barbiton and the syrinx.

== See also ==
- History of primitive and non-Western trumpets
