= Chazozra =

Musical instrument

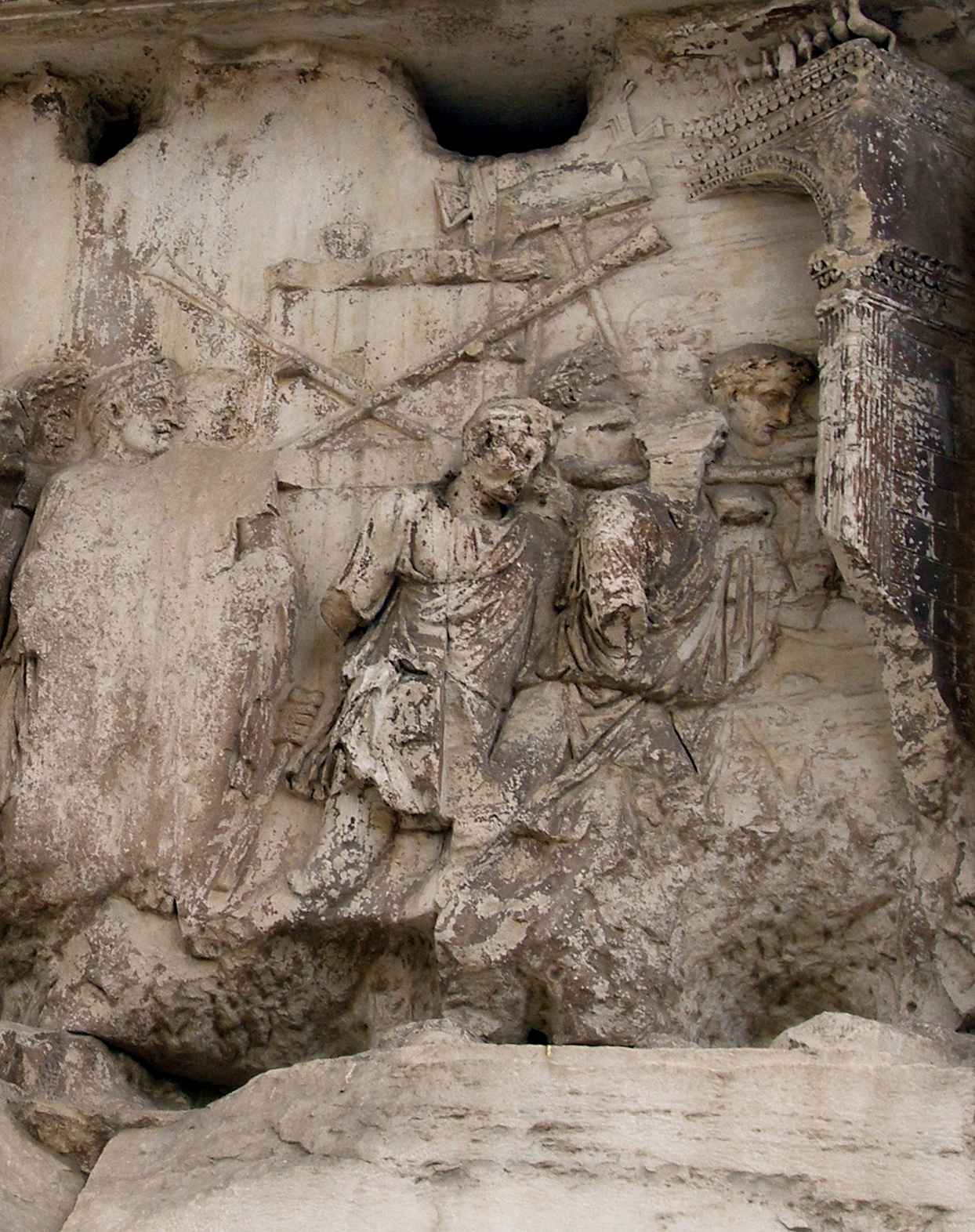
Art from the Arch of Titus showing the Chazozra trumpets, carried away by Roman soldiers

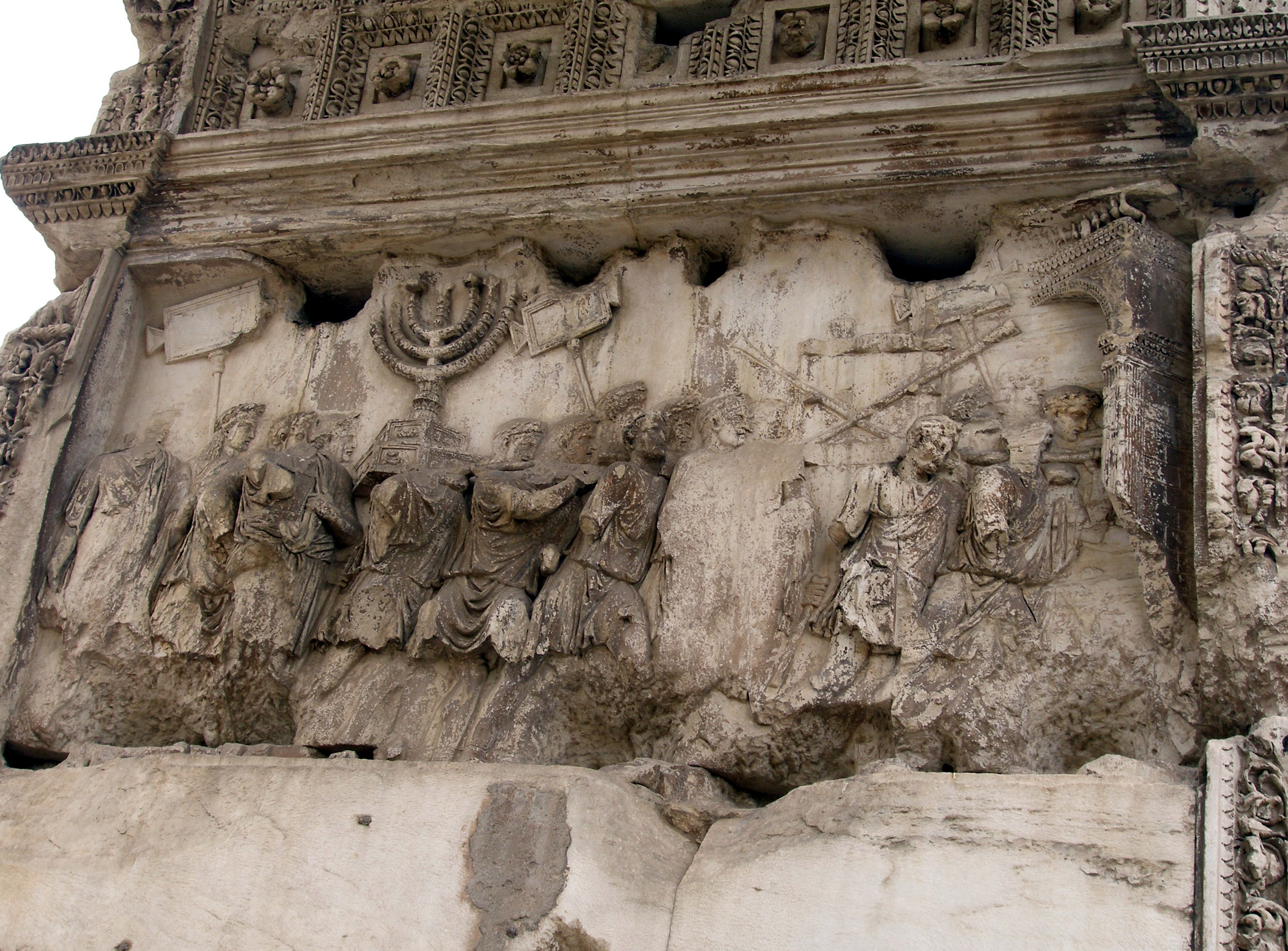
Relief of the Arch of Titus, on the right two chazozras

Chazozra, also hazozra, hasosrah, hasoserah, plural chazozrot, hasoserot (Hebrew: חצוצרות) was a natural trumpet used in religious rituals by the Israelites, made of bronze, silver or silver alloys. The chazozra is mentioned 31 times in the Old Testament and is translated tuba in the Vulgate. The first written description of the chazozra is probably recorded in the 4th book of Moses. The prophet Moses is from Elohim prompted: "And the LORD spoke to Moses and said: Make two trumpets of beaten silver..." (4 Mos 10)

The straight metal trumpet chazozra can be distinguished from the curved natural horn shofar by its design. While the word shofar derives from Akkadian, chazozra is based on the Hebrew consonant root ḤṢR (“housing”, “fence”, derived “tube”). The shape, but not the name, appears to have been imported from Egypt, deriving from the simpler Egyptian military trumpet sheneb, which produced only two notes. The chazozra was usually played in pairs. While the chazozra is attributed to the institutionalized sacred area and the circle of power of the Second Temple, the shofar was part of the magical-mystical worship of God

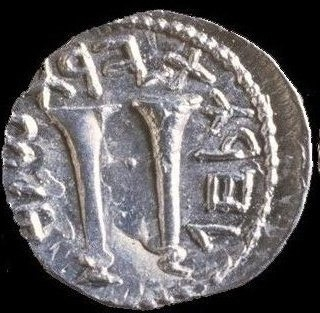
Chazozras on a Bar Kokhba coin

According to the Bible, the dedication of Solomon's temple included “…120 priests who blew trumpets. And it was as if it were someone who trumpeted..., as if a voice could be heard praising and thanking the LORD." ( 2 Chr 5,12-13)

When the Second Temple was destroyed in 70 AD at the end of the Jewish War, the stolen temple equipment was taken to Rome. An illustration of this can be found in the form of two reliefs on the Arch of Titus in Rome (c. 70 AD), which were only added later, around 190 AD. Flavius Josephus states the length of a chazozra in his book Antiquities of the Jews as a "bare cubit" (approx. 46 cm).

Josh Wander worked on remaking them. After extensive planning, preparation and supervision, the trumpets were made and on Tisha B’Av in 2024, the trumpets were blown for the first time in 2000 years. Since then, Wander has blown them at a number of events including when Israel went out to war against Hamas.

== See also ==
- History of the trumpet § Ancient Israel

== Literature ==
- Edward H. Tarr: The Trumpet . Schott, Mainz 1984. ISBN 3-7957-2357-4
