= Rozhok =

Russian musical instrument

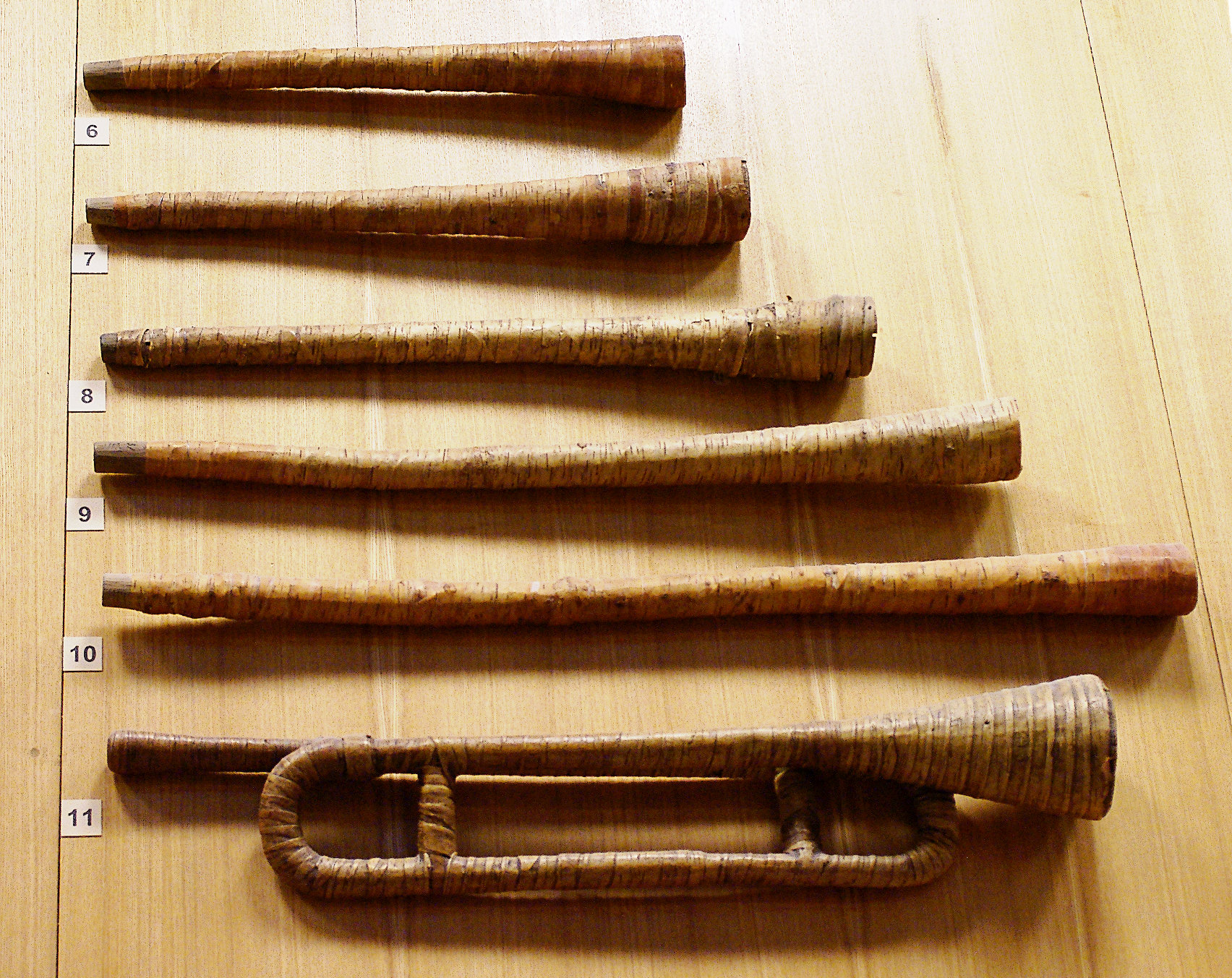
Rozhoks from the Russian Ethnographic Museum, first half of 20th century

The rozhok (Russian: рожок) is an ancient Russian wooden trumpet, a relative of the cornett, which has remained in continuous use until the present day.

== Names ==
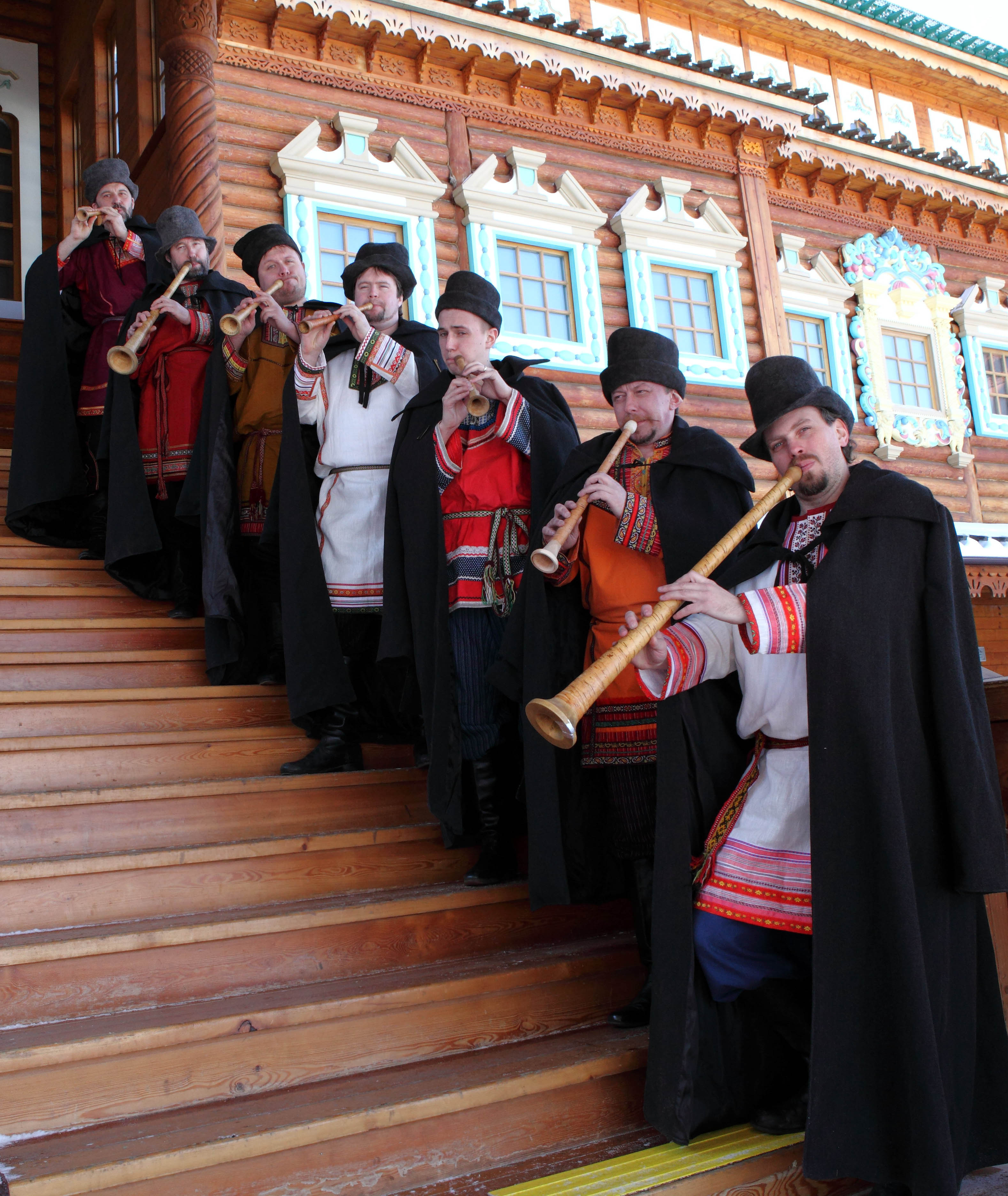
Rozhok horns of varying sizes.

A rozhok can be called be various names: shepherd's horn (Russian: пастуший рожок), Russian horn (Russian: Русский рожок), or song horn (Russian: песенный рожок). A popular variant is (Russian: Владимирский рожок, Vladimirskiy rozhok, "Vladimir horn"), due to the success of a chorus of rozhok players under the leadership of Nikolai Vasilyevich Kondratyev from the Vladimir region.

== Structure ==
A rozhok is a conical straight tube with the six playing holes: five on top and one underneath. The total length of a rozhok ranges from 320 to 830 mm (13" to 33"). A mouthpiece is cut in the form of a small cup, and the lower end of the tube is shaped like a conical bell. A rozhok is usually made of birch (mostly birch bark), maple, or juniper. In the past they were made in two halves fastened together with birch bark; today they are turned. The sound of a rozhok is strong, but mellow, having a range of about an octave, or a little more. There are several types of rozhoks: the shortest one, having the highest sound is called vizgunok (squeaker), typically in F# or G; the longest and thus the lowest one is called bas (bass), in F# or G an octave below, while a mid-size instrument is called a polubasok (half-bass), typically in C. It is polubasok instruments that are most frequently used for solo playing. Rozhok ensembles usually consist of just vizgunok and bas instruments in the ratio 2:1 (twice as many high-pitched horns).

== Varieties ==
As of 2015, rozhok ensembles exist in Moscow, Vladimir and Nerekhta.

== See also ==
- Russian horn orchestra
- Timeline of Russian inventions and technology records
