= Hábrók =

Bird from Norse mythology

In Norse mythology, Hábrók is, according to Grímnismál, and quoted by Snorri Sturluson in Gylfaginning, as the "best of hawks" in a list containing various other names which represent the best of things. However, nothing more is known of this creature. The name is translated as "High Pants" which may refer to the bird's long legs.
