= Midwinter horn =

Wooden natural trumpet

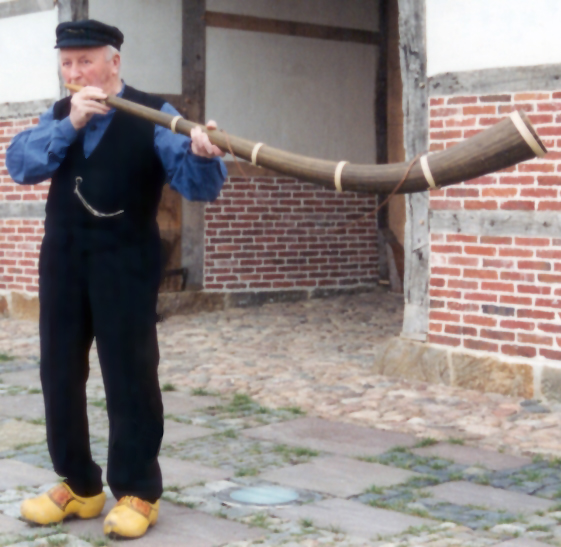
Playing a midwinter horn in the County of Bentheim

The midwinter horn, in Dutch midwinterhoorn and in various dialects of Low German Middewinterhorn, Mittewinterhorn, Mirrewinterhorn, Midwinterhorn and Mittwinterhorn, also known as the dewertshorn and adventshorn (Advent horn), is a wooden natural trumpet traditionally blown at the Christmas season in areas of the Netherlands and nearby parts of North Germany.

== Characteristics and manufacture ==
A midwinter horn is about 1.3 m (4 ft) long, although they vary in size and are said to have become longer in modern times. They are made from slightly curved tree trunks of, for example, alder (said to be the traditional material), birch, or willow, which are cut in half lengthwise, hollowed out until the walls are about 1 cm (half an inch) thick, and then rejoined. The halves are either glued together, clamped at intervals with metal rings or automotive clamps, or, traditionally, bound with willow or bramble withies or split rushes, and traditionally the horn is dipped in water to seal cracks and then played wet; water is usually also poured down the instrument immediately before playing. A mouthpiece, usually made of elder wood, is added; this is cut at a slant, like that of the Celtic carnyx, and the horn is played laterally. In the early twentieth century, wooden midwinter horns were replaced by sheet metal horns, made in sections to achieve the desired curve, but still with a wooden mouthpiece; the folklore revival displaced these modern instruments.

Unlike the similar but larger alphorn, the midwinter horn is held in the hands when played, rather than rested on the ground. It is traditionally held over water, supposedly for amplification although the shape of the curve and the angle at which the instrument is held make this ineffective. Approximately eight notes can be produced, but since they vary between instruments, midwinter horns are not played together.

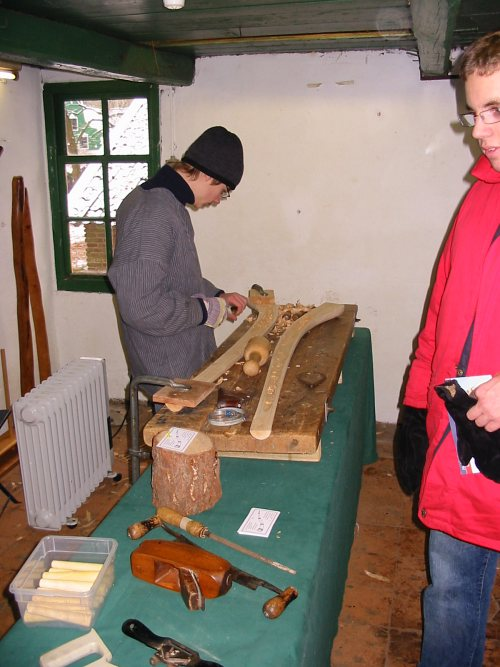
Making a midwinter horn at the Netherlands Open Air Museum in Arnhem

== Use and geographical distribution ==
The playing of wooden horns at midwinter is an old tradition on either side of the Dutch-German border that has been revived in recent years in, for example, the County of Bentheim in Germany and Twente in the Netherlands.

Playing midwinter horns is now practised as an announcement and celebration of Christmas: the horns are sounded from the beginning of Advent (late November or early December) to Epiphany (6 January). Many villages and town neighbourhoods in the border region have groups of midwinter horn players, who sound their instruments one after the other. The tradition in Gelderland and Overijssel has been listed as a national heritage tradition of the Netherlands on the Nationale Inventaris Immaterieel Cultureel Erfgoed.

The first recorded mention of the midwinter horn dates to 1815, but the tradition is generally thought to derive from Germanic Yule custom, both to summon help and to repel evil spirits. The Indiculus proscribes the sounding of horns along with the playing of bells as Saxon heathen methods of warding off bad weather. The playing of ox horns in Friesland has been shown by excavations to date back a thousand years; the custom survived, on Christmas Eve and Christmas Day, in parts of West Twente until the end of the 19th century and was revived in Markelo in 1988. The region is a Catholic enclave within overwhelmingly Protestant areas, and the horns may well have been blown to warn neighbouring farmers of danger; during the German occupation of the Netherlands in the Second World War, they were used to signal the approach of a patrol. However, the folklorist J. J. Voskuil saw the midwinter horn as deriving not from Germanic paganism but from medieval nativity plays depicting horn-blowing shepherds, and argued that the modern tradition was new folklore having more to do with regional identity than with the pagan past.

Sounding a midwinter horn in the Netherlands in 1930
