= Lur =

Long natural horn

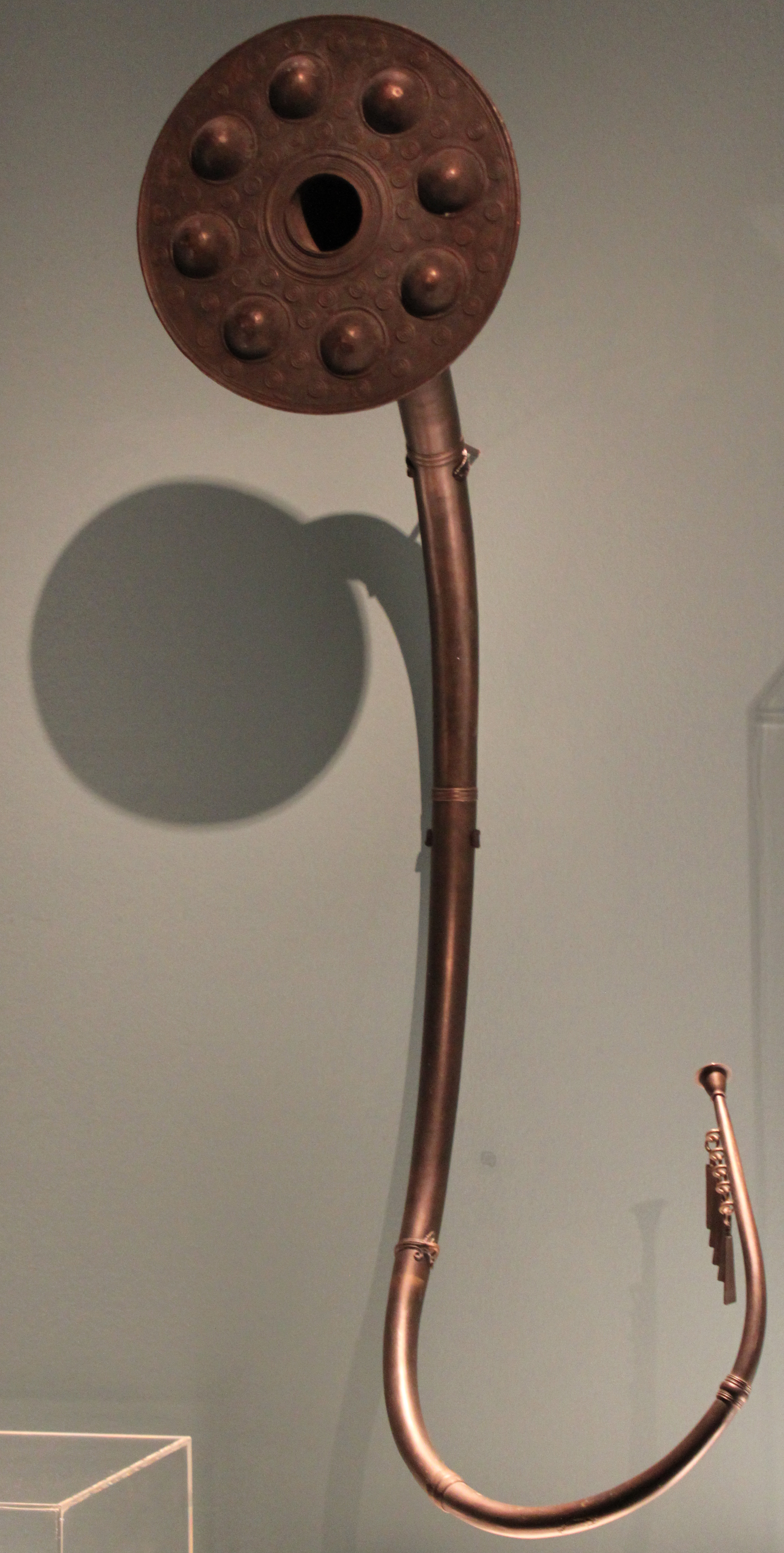
A Bronze Age lur found in Brudevælte Mose, northeast of Lynge in Zealand, Denmark

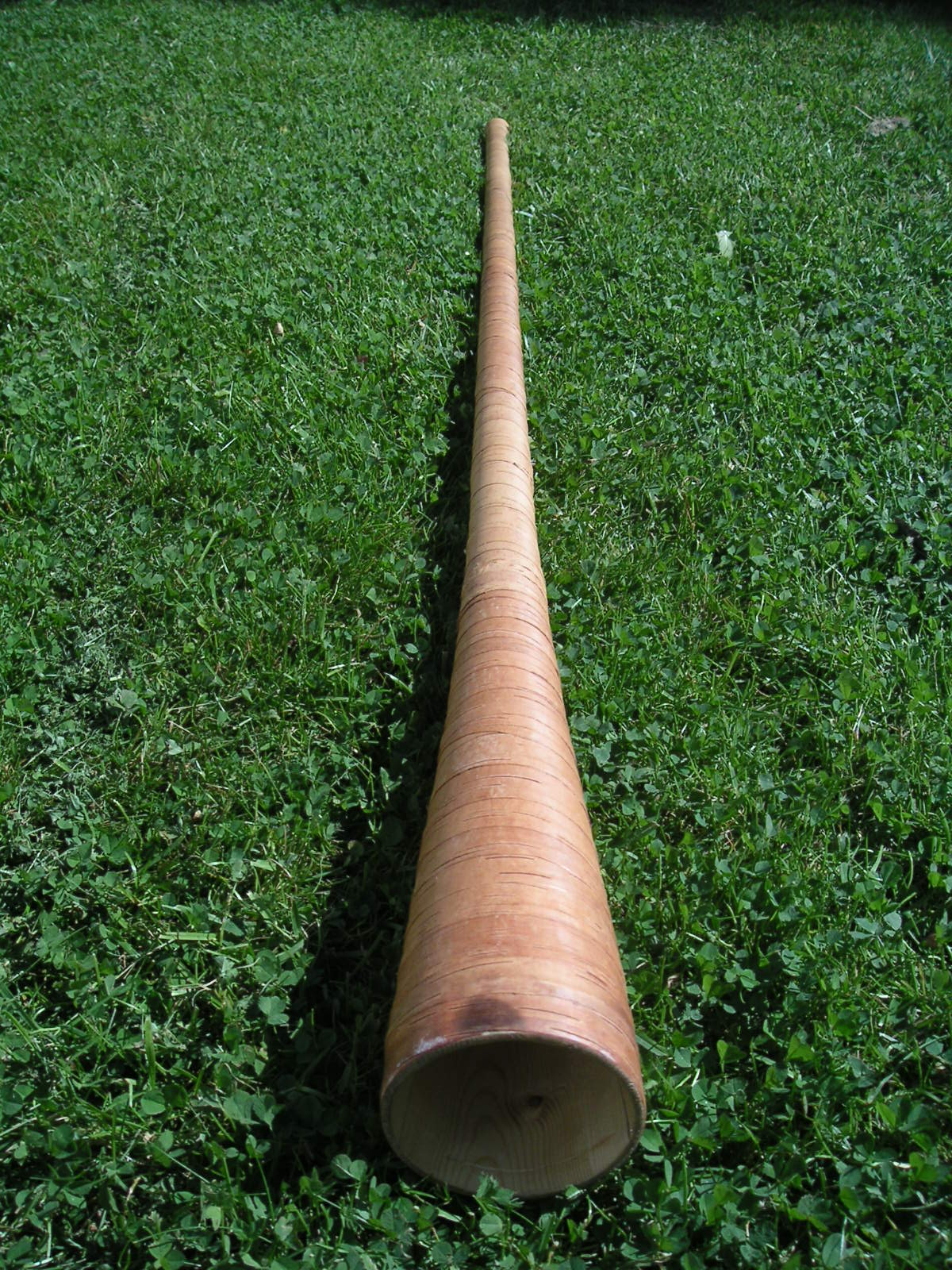
A modern lur from Norway, made of wood wrapped in birch bark

A lur, also lure or lurr, is a long natural horn without finger holes that is played with a brass-type embouchure. Lurs can be straight or curved in various shapes. The purpose of the curves was to make long instruments easier to carry (e.g. for marching, like the modern sousaphone) and to avoid directing the loud noise at nearby people.

The name lur is used for two distinct types of ancient wind instruments. The more recent type is made of wood and was in use in Scandinavia during the Middle Ages. The older type, named after the more recent type, is made of bronze, dates to the Bronze Age and was often found in pairs, deposited in bogs, mainly in Denmark and Germany. It consists of a mouthpiece and several pieces and/or pipes. Its length can reach between 1.5 and 2 metres. It has been found in Norway, Denmark, South Sweden, and Northern Germany. Illustrations of lurs have also been found on several rock paintings in Scandinavia.

== Wooden lurs ==
The earliest references to an instrument called the lur come from Icelandic sagas, where they are described as war instruments, used to marshal troops and frighten the enemy. These lurs, several examples of which have been discovered in longboats, are straight, end-blown wooden tubes, around one metre long. They do not have finger holes, and are played much like a modern brass instrument.

A kind of lur very similar to these war instruments has been played by farmers and milkmaids in Nordic countries since at least the Middle Ages. These instruments, called in English a birch trumpet, were used for calling cattle and signalling. They are similar in construction and playing technique to the war instrument, but are covered in birch, while the war instruments are covered in willow.

== Bronze lurs ==
Lurs made of bronze were used as musical instruments in ancient Greece, as well as in northern Europe where a total of 56 lurs have been discovered: 35 (including fragmentary ones) in Denmark, 11 in Sweden, 4 in Norway, 5 in northern Germany, and a single one in Latvia.

== Lurs today ==
The word lur is still in the Swedish language, indicating any funnel-shaped implement used for producing or receiving sound. For instance, the Swedish word for headphones is hörlurar (hearing-lurs), and a telephone might be referred to as a lur in contemporary Swedish (derived from telefonlur, telephone handset), and luuri is similarly used in Finnish for the handset part of old-fashioned landline telephones. The Norwegian and Swedish words for foghorn are respectively tåkelur and mistlur. The Danish butter brand Lurpak is named after the lur, and the package design contains pictures of lurs.

Icelandic composer Jón Leifs wrote for lurs in some of his orchestral works.

The word lur has several other meanings in Danish, Norwegian, and Swedish that are not related to sound.

== See also ==
- Natural trumpet
- Carnyx
