= Trumpet repertoire =

Set of available musical works for trumpet

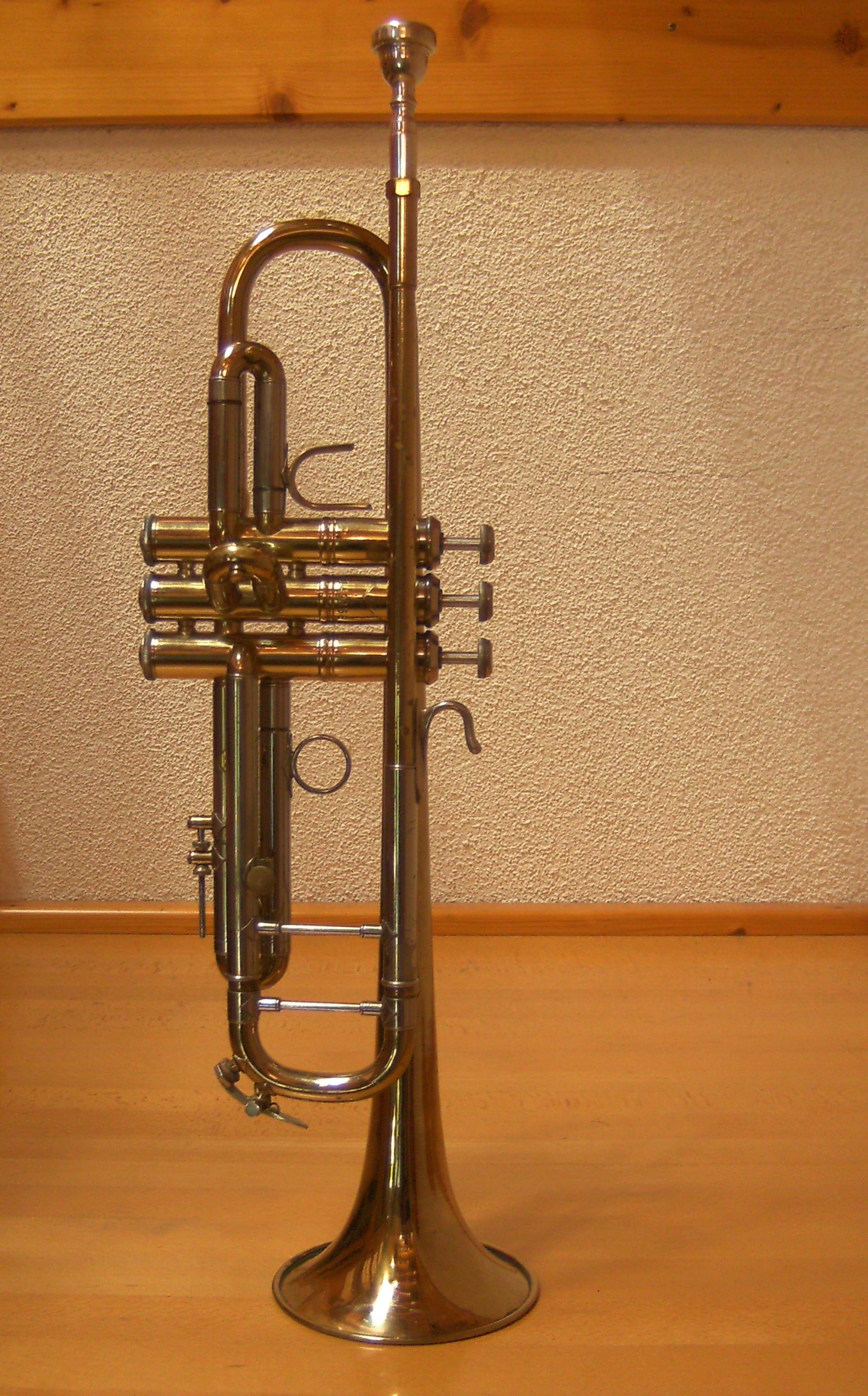
A modern B♭ trumpet (Bach Stradivarius model)

The trumpet repertoire consists of solo literature and orchestral or, more commonly, band parts written for the trumpet. Tracings its origins to 1500 BC, the trumpet is a musical instrument with the highest register in the brass family.

Among the repertoire for the trumpet are the following works:

== Solo trumpet ==
- Samuel Adler, Canto I, for B♭ or C trumpet
- Louis Andriessen, A Very Sad Trumpet Sonata

A Very Sharp Trumpet Sonata

- Mark Applebaum, Authenticity

Entre Funérailles I

- Richard Ayres, No. 27 "Blue"
- Sven-Erik Bäck, March and Song
- Gerald Barry, Trumpeter
- Luciano Berio, Good night
- Lauren Bernofsky, Fantasia
- Lisa Bielawa, Synopsis #5: He Figures Out What Clouds Mean
- Harrison Birtwistle, Antiphonies from the Moonkeeper

Five Little Antiphonies for Amelia

- Daniel Börtz, Målning
- Howard J. Buss, A Day in the City, Commemoration
- Elliott Carter, Retracing III
- Aaron Cassidy, What then renders these forces visible is a strange smile (or, First Study for Figures at the Base of a Crucifixion)
- Friedrich Cerha, The Pied Piper
- Nicolas Collins, Sonnet 40
- Peter Maxwell Davies, Litany – for a Ruined Chapel between Sheep and Shore, for solo C trumpet

Sonatina, for solo trumpet

- Lucia Dlugoszewski, Space Is a Diamond
- Anders Eliasson, Prelude
- Robert Erickson, Kryl, for solo C trumpet
- Morton Feldman, A Very Short Trumpet Piece
- HK Gruber, Exposed Throat
- Hans Werner Henze, Sonatina, for trumpet
- Robin Holloway, Sonata for solo trumpet
- Mauricio Kagel, Old/New, for trumpet

Morceau de Concours

- Hanna Kulenty, Brass No. 1, for double bell trumpet
- Eres Holz, MACH, for B♭ trumpet (2011)
- Libby Larsen, Fanfare for the Women, for solo C trumpet
- Ingvar Lidholm, Epigram
- György Ligeti, The Big Turtle-Fanfare from the South China Sea
- Liza Lim, Wild-Winged One
- Witold Lutosławski, Tune
- Peter Machajdík, If
- Isabel Mundry, Solo auf Schwellen, for double bell trumpet
- Sergiu Natra, Sonatina
- Olga Neuwirth, Laki, for solo C trumpet
- Per Nørgård, Scale – Fanfare – Variation
- Nigel Osborne, Flamingo Time-Line
- Vincent Persichetti, Parable XIV for Trumpet, Op. 127
- Matthias Pintscher, Shining Forth
- Anthony Plog, Postcards
- Folke Rabe, Shazam
- Gottfried Reiche, Abblasen
- Wolfgang Rihm, Little Echo Fantasy
- Poul Ruders, Reveille-Retraite
- David Sampson, Litany of Breath
- Giacinto Scelsi, Four Pieces
- Rebecca Saunders, Blaauw, for double bell trumpet
- Kurt Schwertsik, Stretch & Yawn
- Roberto Sierra, Fanfare
- Juan María Solare, Israfil

Unterwegs
Perlas esparcidas
Weise weiße Weisen
Serpentine
Reverence (Homage to Bach)
Petite Suite Antique
Art-Man, for double bell trumpet
Avanti

- Karlheinz Stockhausen, Eingang und Formel, for solo B♭ trumpet

In Freundschaft, for solo 4-valve E♭ trumpet
Oberlippentanz, for solo B♭ piccolo trumpet
Harmonien, for solo C trumpet

- Toru Takemitsu, Paths, for solo C trumpet
- Hilary Tann, Look Little Low Heavens
- Antoine Tisné, Emotion, for C trumpet solo
- Mark-Anthony Turnage, An Aria With Dancing, for solo B♭ trumpet
- Stefan Wolpe, Solo Piece for Trumpet
- Valentin Zubiaurre, Audition Piece for Trumpet

== Trumpet ensemble ==
- Sally Beamish, Fanfare for 2 trumpets
- Heinrich Ignaz Biber, Duets for 2 trumpets

Sonata for 2 trumpets, 2 violins, 2 violas & continuo No. 1 in C major, C. 114
Sonata for 2 trumpets, 2 violins & continuo No. 7 in G major, C. 120
Sonata for 2 trumpets, 2 violins, 2 violas & continuo No. 12 in C major, C. 125

- Larry Bitensky, Fanfare for 6 trumpets and tympani
- Harrison Birtwistle, Placid Mobile for 36 trumpets
- Vassily Brandt, Country Pictures for 4 trumpets
- Henry Brant, Flight Over a Global Map for 100 or 56 trumpets and percussion

Millennium I for 8 trumpets and 3 percussionists

- Benjamin Britten, Fanfare for St Edmundsbury for 3 trumpets
- Bruce Broughton, Contest Piece for Eight Trumpets for 8 trumpets
- Howard J. Buss, Festive Overture for 8 trumpets

Prelude and Intrada for 4 trumpets
Rendezvous for 4 trumpets and one percussion
The Walls of Jericho for solo trumpet and 6-part trumpet ensemble

- Elliott Carter, Birthday Flourish for 5 trumpets (or brass quintet)

Canon for Three for 3 trumpets

- Eric Ewazen, A Concert Fanfare for 6 trumpets

Fantasia for Seven Trumpets
Prelude and Fugue for Trumpet Choir for 6 trumpets
Sonatina for Two Trumpets
Sonoran Desert Harmonies for 8 trumpets

- Sofia Gubaidulina, Trio for 3 trumpets
- Cristóbal Halffter, Little Fanfare for Two Trumpets
- Bengt Hambraeus, A Small Concert Piece for trumpet and tomtom
- Robin Holloway, Sonata for 2 trumpets
- Bertold Hummel, Saeckingen for 6 trumpets and timpani, Op. 103f (2000)
- Mauricio Kagel, Fanfanfaren for 4 trumpets

Morceau de Concours for 2 trumpets

- Fabien Lévy, à peu près de for 2 trumpets
- Johann Jacob Löwe, Capriccio No. 1 for 2 trumpets and continuo

Capriccio No. 2 for 2 trumpets and continuo

- Frederik Magle, The Fairest of Roses (Den yndigste rose) for two trumpets and organ
- Peter Maxwell Davies, Quintet for 5 trumpets
- Ben-Zion Orgad, Melosalgia for 2 trumpets
- Robert Paterson, Fanfare for 6 Trumpets
- Krzysztof Penderecki, Luzerner Fanfare for 8 trumpets and percussion
- Vincent Persichetti, Parable XXV for 2 Trumpets, op. 164
- Johann Christoph Pezel, Sonata No. 69 for 2 trumpets and continuo

Sonata No. 71 for 2 trumpets and continuo
Sonata No. 75 for 2 trumpets and continuo

- Lucia Ronchetti, Dazbog for soprano and 2 trumpets
- Carl Ruggles, Angels for 6 muted trumpets
- David Sampson, Flight for 3 trumpets
- Elliott Schwartz, Downeast Fanfare for 3 trumpets
- Stefano Scodanibbio, Plaza for 4 trumpets
- Judith Shatin, Hearing the Call for 2 trumpets and 2 snare drums
- Juan María Solare, Aquelarre (tercera noche de Walpurgis) for 3 trumpets

Fun-fare for 4 trumpets and a drum
Fricción for 2 trumpets

- Thomas Stevens, A New Carnival of Venice for four trumpets and orchestra

Triangles for 3 trumpets

- Karlheinz Stockhausen, Donnerstags Abschied for 5 trumpets

Michaels-Ruf for 4 trumpets
Trumpetent for 4 trumpets

- Igor Stravinsky, Fanfare for a New Theatre for 2 trumpets
- Josef Tal, Fanfare for 3 trumpets & 3 trombones
- Georg Philipp Telemann, Concerto No. 1 for 3 trumpets and timpani in D Major, TWV 54:D3

Concerto No. 2 for 3 trumpets and timpani in D Major, TWV 54:D4

- Henri Tomasi, Trio for 3 trumpets
- Joan Tower, Fanfare for the Uncommon Woman (No. 5) for 4 trumpets
- Kenny Wheeler, Trumpet Quartet
- Charles Wuorinen, Epithalamium for 2 trumpets

Big Epithalamium for 8, 12 or 16 trumpets

- La Monte Young, The Second Dream of the High-Tension Line Stepdown Transformer for 8 trumpets
- John Zorn, Antiphonal Fanfare for the Great Hall for 6 trumpets

== Brass trio ==
- Leslie Bassett, Brass Trio
- Howard J. Buss, "Trigon" for trumpet, trombone, and tuba

"Enigmatic Triptych" for trumpet, horn, and trombone
"Elegy" for horn, trombone, and tuba

- Eric Ewazen, A Philharmonic Fanfare
- Frigyes Hidas, Triga
- Lior Navok, Paper Tigers
- Václav Nelhýbel, Trio for Brass
- Anthony Plog, Trio for Brass
- Francis Poulenc, Sonata for horn, trumpet & trombone
- Lucia Ronchetti, Laura o delle simmetrie in ombra
- David Sampson, Duncan Trio
- John D. Stevens, Triangles
- Fisher Tull, Trio

== Brass quintet ==
- See Brass quintet repertoire

== Brass ensemble ==
- Howard J. Buss, Brom Bones for 4 trumpets, one horn, 3 tenor trombones, one bass trombone, and tuba

Three Jazzicals for trumpet and tuba
Time Capsule in versions for flute and trumpet, and trumpet and trombone
Chromatic Fantasy for 2 trumpets, horn, trombone, and tuba
Concord for 2 trumpets, horn, trombone, and tuba
Contrasts in Blue for trumpet, trombone and piano
Sonic Fables: Lessons from Aesop for 2 trumpets, horn, trombone, tuba, and one percussion
Trigon for trumpet, trombone and tuba
Enigmatic Triptych for trumpet, trombone and tuba
Elegy for horn, trombone and tuba

- Wen-Chung Chou, Soliloquy of a bhiksuni, for trumpet with brass and percussion ensemble
- Louis Durey, Interlude for 4 trumpets, 4 horns, 3 trombones, tuba and tympani, Op. 112
- Gala Flagello

I Could Fall for brass ensemble
The Parting Glass for brass ensemble
Watch Me for brass ensemble

- Malcolm Forsyth, Aphorisms for trumpet, two horns, trombone and tuba
- Philip Glass, Brass Sextet for 2 trumpets, 2 horns, trombone and tuba
- Jacques Hétu, Fanfare pour une fête, 4 French horns, 4 trumpets, 4 trombones, tuba, 2000

Fanfare pour Lanaudière, 4 French horns, 3 trumpets, 3 trombones, tuba

- Fred Ho, Fanfare for the Creeping Meatball, for 2 trumpets and 2 trombones
- Eres Holz, Vier Schatten, for 2 trumpets, French horn, trombone and tuba
- André Jolivet, Fanfares pour Britannicus for brass ensemble
- Peter Machajdík, Arching Sentiments, for brass quintet (2 trumpets, horn, tenor trombone and bass trombone)
- Darius Milhaud, Fanfare for brass ensemble, Op.396

Fanfare for 2 trumpets and trombone, Op.400

- Lior Navok, Gitz & Spitz Suite, for brass quartet
- Raymond Premru, Quartet, for brass quartet
- Jean Sibelius, Tiera for Brass Septet and Percussion, JS200 (1899)
- R. Murray Schafer, Isfahan for three brass quintets
- David Sampson, Winter Ceremony for 2 trumpets and percussion
- Clare Shore, Game Piece No. 1 for bells, violin and brass quartet
- Karlheinz Stockhausen, Drachenkampf, for trumpet, trombone, and synthesizer
- Germaine Tailleferre, Prélude et fugue for organ, 2 trumpets and 2 trombones
- Michael Tippett, The Wolf Trap Fanfare, for three trumpets, two trombones and tuba
- Mark-Anthony Turnage, Set To, for brass ensemble
- William Walton, Introduction to the National Anthem, for three trumpets, three trombones and snare drum (orig. 12 trumpets)
- Christian Wolff, Peace March 9, for brass choir and percussion

== Trumpet and keyboard ==
- George Antheil, Sonata, for trumpet and piano, W. 143
- Leonard Bernstein, Rondo for Lifey for trumpet and piano
- Larry Bitensky, From Those Beginning Notes of Yearning for trumpet and piano
- Vladislav Blazhevich, Concerto No. 5 for trumpet and piano

Scherzo for trumpet and piano

- Rory Boyle, 4 Bagatelles for trumpet and piano
- Eugène Bozza, Lied, Badinage and Caprice, for trumpet and piano
- Vassily Brandt, Concertpiece No. 1 Opus 11 for trumpet and piano
- Yehezkel Braun, Sonata for trumpet and piano
- Stephen Brown, Wind in the Long Grass, sonata for trumpet and piano, (2025)
- Howard J. Buss, Meditation and Caprice for trumpet and piano

Skylines for trumpet and piano

- Théo Charlier: Solo de Concours
- George Enescu, Légende, for trumpet and piano
- Hans Ulrich Engelmann, Epitaph für einen imaginären Freund, for trumpet and piano
- Thierry Escaich, Tanz-Fantasie for trumpet and piano or organ
- Eric Ewazen, Sonata for Trumpet and Piano
- Gala Flagello, A Crab, A Quill for trumpet and piano
- Richard Halligan, Meditation, for trumpet and piano
- Thorvald Hansen, Sonata for Cornet & Piano, Op. 18
- Jennifer Higdon, Trumpet Songs for trumpet and piano
- Paul Hindemith, Trumpet Sonata
- Arthur Honegger, Intrada, for C trumpet and piano, H 193
- Bertold Hummel, Sonatina for trumpet and piano, Op. 1a

Invocationes for trumpet and organ, Op. 68a
Trio for trumpet, percussion and piano, Op. 82a

- Jacques Ibert, Impromptu
- Norman Dello Joio, Sonata for Trumpet and Piano
- André Jolivet, Air de Bravoure for trumpet and piano
- Kent Kennan, Sonata for trumpet and piano
- Meyer Kupferman, Three Ideas for trumpet and piano
- Thomas Larcher, Uchafu for trumpet and piano
- Morten Lauridsen, Sonata for trumpet and piano
- David Loeb, Litany for trumpet and piano

Moresca for trumpet and piano

- Frederik Magle, Kosmos for trumpet and organ
- Bohuslav Martinů, Sonatina for Trumpet & Piano, H. 357
- Sergiu Natra, Music for Harp and Three Brass Instruments
- Johann Ludwig Krebs, Fantasie in C major for trumpet and organ

Fantasie in D major for trumpet and organ

- Karl Pilß, Sonata for trumpet and piano (1935)
- William Presser, Suite for trumpet and piano
- Jean-Baptiste Robin, Récits Héroïques (Heroic Tales) for trumpet and organ
- David Sampson, The Mysteries Remain for trumpet and organ
- Somei Satoh, Hikari(Light) for trumpet and piano
- Joseph Guy Ropartz, Andante et Allegro for trumpet and piano
- Adam Schoenberg, Separated by Space for trumpet and piano
- Nikos Skalkottas, Concertino for trumpet and piano
- Halsey Stevens, Sonata for trumpet and piano
- Robert Suderburg, Chamber Music VII ("Ceremonies"), for trumpet and piano

Chamber Music VIII (Sonata for trumpet and piano)

- Germaine Tailleferre, Choral for trumpet and piano

Galliarde for trumpet and piano

- Augusta Read Thomas, Angel Tears & Earth Prayers, for trumpet and organ
- Henri Tomasi, Triptyque for trumpet and piano
- Pavel Josef Vejvanovský, Sonata a 4 in G minor for trumpet and organ
- Giovanni Viviani, Sonata No. 1 for trumpet and organ

Sonata No. 2 for trumpet and organ

- Alec Wilder, Sonata for trumpet and piano
- Charles Wuorinen, Nature's Concord for trumpet and piano

== Chamber music with trumpet ==
- Tomaso Albinoni, Concerto for trumpet, 3 oboes, and basso continuo in C major
- George Antheil, Symphony for Five Instruments for flute, bassoon, trumpet, trombone and viola
- Georges Aperghis, Trio, for flute, clarinet and trumpet
- Shai Cohen, Circles of Time for trumpet and string quartet

Encounters for trumpet and Piano

- José Ardévol, "Música de Cámera para seis instrumentos" for flute, clarinet, basson, trumpet, violin and cello
- Georges Auric, Suite for clarinet, bassoon, trumpet, violin, cello and piano, incidental music to Marlborough s'en va-t'en guerre
- Johann Sebastian Bach, Brandenburg Concerto No. 2 in F major, BWV 1047
- David Baker, "Hommage a l'Histoire" for clarinet, trumpet trombone, percussion, violin and double bass
- Luciano Berio, Kol-Od for trumpet and chamber ensemble

Sequenza X for trumpet and piano

- Harrison Birtwistle, Hoquetus Petrus for piccolo trumpet and 2 flutes
- Heinrich Ignaz Biber, Sonata for trumpet, violin, 2 violas and continuo No. 4 in C major, C. 117

Sonata for trumpet, violin, 2 violas and continuo No. 10 in G minor, C. 123

- Larry Bitensky, The Other Side concertino for trumpet and chamber ensemble
- Anonimo Bolognese, Concerto Op. 4, No. 7 for trumpet, 2 violins, cello and continuo
- Henry Brant, Concave for mezzo-soprano, baritone, trumpet, trombone and chamber ensemble

Wind, Water, Clouds and Fire for jazz trumpet, improv organ, improv marimba, 4 choruses and ensemble

- Howard J. Buss, Contrasts in Blue for trumpet, trombone, and piano

Remembrances for trumpet, cello, and piano (2000)
Atmospheres for trumpet/flugelhourn and percussion (2005)
Incantation for trumpet and percussion (1994)
Serendipity Suite for trumpet, trombone, and piano (2016)

- Alfredo Casella, Serenata for clarinet, basson, trumpet, violin, and cello

Sinfonia' for piano, clarinet, trumpet and cello, op. 54

- Ornette Coleman, The Sacred Mind of Johnny Dolphin for double string quartet, trumpet and percussion
- Arcangelo Corelli, Sonata in D major for trumpet, 2 violins and continuo
- Peter Maxwell Davies, Quintet for trumpet and string quartet
- Vincent d'Indy, Suite in Olden Style for two flutes, trumpet, 2 violins, viola, cello, op. 24
- Donald Erb, Dance Pieces for violin, piano, trumpet and percussion
- Robert Erickson, Night Music
- Thierry Escaich, Antiennes oubliées for violin, cello, flute, saxophone, trumpet, trombone and percussion

Élégie for trumpet and instrumental ensemble

- Eric Ewazen, "Mandala", for flute, clarinet, trumpet, violin, and cello

Quintet for trumpet and strings
Trio for trumpet, cello (viola, trombone or flute), and piano
Trio In E♭ for trumpet, violin and piano

- Mohammed Fairouz, Meditation for alto saxophone, trumpet, and amplified double bass

Three Shakespeare Songs for clarinet, bassoon, trumpet, trombone, harp, mezzo soprano, violin, double bass

- Lorenzo Ferrero, Freedom Variations for trumpet and chamber ensemble
- David Gillingham, ‘’Tourbilion, Whirlwind’’ trio for violin, trumpet and piano
- Alexei Haieff, "Dance Suite: Princess Zondilda and her Entourage" for flute, bassoon, trumpet, violin, cello and piano
- Richard Halligan, Dialogues, for trumpet, piano and percussion
- Paul Hindemith, "Drei Stücke" for clarinet, trumpet, violin, double bass and piano

"Tafelmusik" for flute, two trumpets, violin, and cello

- Johann Nepomuk Hummel, Septett Militaire in C major for piano, flute, violin, clarinet, cello, trumpet and double bass, op. 114
- Charles Ives, "Allegretto Sombreoso" for flute, trumpet, three violins, and piano

"Fugue in Four Keys on the Shining Shore" for flute, trumpet, two violins, viola, cello and double bass
"Scherzo (all the way around and back)" for flute, trumpet, violin, piano and percussion

- Vincent A. Jockin, Quintet, Op. 27, No. 1, for trumpet and string quartet
- André Jolivet, Heptade for trumpet and percussion

12 Inventions for wind quintet, trumpet, trombone, and string quintet

- Jo Kondo, "Durante l'Inverno"
- Liza Lim, Ehwaz for trumpet and percussion

Songs Found in Dream for oboe, clarinet, saxophone, trumpet, 2 percussionists, cello and bass
Veil for flute, clarinet, trumpet, percussion, piano, violin, and cello

- Bohuslav Martinů, "La Revue de Cuisine" for clarinet, bassoon, trumpet, violin, cello and piano

Cantata "All'armi, pensieri" for soprano, trumpet, cello and continuo
Cantata "Quai bellici accenti" for soprano, trumpet, cello and continuo

- Darius Milhaud, Hécube incidental music for flute, clarinet, bassoon, trumpet and percussion, Op. 177

Jules César, incidental music for flute, clarinet (or saxophone), trumpet, tuba and percussion, Op. 158
Macbeth incidental music for flute, clarinet, bassoon, violin, cello, trumpet and percussion, op. 175

- Václav Nelhýbel, "Quintetto Concertante" for trumpet, trombone, violin, xylophone and piano
- Francis Poulenc, Quatre poèmes de Max Jacob for voice, flute, oboe, bassoon, trumpet and violin

Suite française for 2 oboes, 2 bassoons, 2 trumpets, 3 trombones, percussion and harpsichord

- William Presser, "Three Duets" for trumpet and double bass
- Frederic Rzewski, Trio for flute, trumpet and piano
- Camille Saint-Saëns, Septet for trumpet, string quartet, double bass and piano, op. 65
- David Sampson, Passage for viola and flugelhorn
- Alessandro Scarlatti, Cantata "Su le sponde del Tebro" for soprano, trumpet, 2 violins, cello and basso continuo
- Karl Schiske, Musik für Klarinette, Trompete und Bratsche
- William Schmidt, "Jazzberries" for trumpet, cello and piano
- Dieter Schnebel, HD for trumpet and 9 Harley-Davidsons
- Ruth Schönthal, "Trompetengesänge" for trumpet, mezzo-soprano, violin, cello, piano and percussion
- Adam Schoenberg, Ailtyud for flute, clarinet, bassoon, alto saxophone, and trumpet
- Elliott Schwartz, Sinfonia Juxta for 2 trumpets, piano and percussion
- Charlotte Seither, Waiting for T for trumpet, trombone, percussion and violoncello
- Alex Shapiro, Elegy for trumpet, cello, and piano
- Roberto Sierra, "Piezas Caracteristicas" for bass clarinet, trumpet, violin, cello, percussion and piano
- Thomas Stevens, Variations on Clifford Intervals for trumpet, vibraphone and bass
- Karlheinz Stockhausen, Bassetsu Trio for basset horn, trumpet, and trombone

Erwachen for soprano saxophone, trumpet, and cello
Glanz for oboe, clarinet, bassoon, trumpet, trombone, tuba, and viola
Halt for trumpet and double bass
Quitt for alto flute, bassethorn, and piccolo trumpet
Schönheit for flute, bass clarinet, and trumpet
Tierkreis Trio for trumpet/piano, flute/piccolo, and clarinet/bassethorn
Vision for trumpet, tenor, mime, and synthesizer

- Alessandro Stradella, Sinfonia alla Serenata "Il Barcheggio" for trumpet, 2 violins, cello and continuo

Sonata a 8 Viole con una Tromba in D major

- Igor Stravinsky, Histoire du Soldat for clarinet, bassoon, cornet, trombone, violin, double bass and percussion

Octet for flute, clarinet, two bassoons, two trumpets, and two trombones

- Carlos Surinach, Hollywood Carnival, Sketches in Cartoon for flute, clarinet, trumpet, double bass and percussion
- Alexandre Tansman, Divertimento for oboe, clarinet, trumpet, cello and piano
- Georg Philipp Telemann, Air for trumpet and continuo in D, TWV41:C1

Quartet for trumpet, 2 oboes and continuo in D, TWV43:D7
Quintet for trumpet, violins, viola and continuo in D, TWV44:1
Sinfonia Spirituosa in D Major (2 violins, viola and continuo, trumpet ad libitum)

- László Tihanyi, L’épitaphe du soldat for clarinet, bassoon, trumpet, trombone, percussion, violin and bass
- Virgil Thomson, Sonata da Chiesa for E♭ clarinet, trumpet, French horn, trombone, and viola
- Giuseppe Torelli, Sonata for strings and trumpet
- Manos Tsangaris, Tafel 3 for trumpet/zugtrompete/quarter-tone flugelhorn/piccolo, soprano, percussion and noise generator (four players in a tree)
- Edgard Varèse, Octandre for seven wind instruments and double bass
- Kevin Volans, "Trumpet and String Quartet No. 1"

"Trumpet and String Quartet No. 2"

- Anton Webern, "Fünf Geistliche Lieder" for flute, clarinet, trumpet, harp, violin and soprano
- Christian Wolff, Boras Song for horn, trumpet, violin and piano

Duo 6 for trumpet and violin
For six or seven players (= Music for Merce Cunningham) for violin, viola, trumpet, trombone, piano and bass
Mosaic Trio for trumpet, violin and piano
Nine for flute, clarinet, horn, trumpet, trombone, celeste, piano and two cellos
Pulse for trumpet and percussion
Trio for flute, trumpet and cello
Variation for trumpet, percussion and bass with sound projection

- Stefan Wolpe, Piece for Trumpet and Seven Instruments

Quartet for trumpet, tenor saxophone, percussion and piano

== Trumpet and orchestra ==
- Michael Abels, American Variations on "Swing Low, Sweet Chariot"
- John Adams, Tromba Iontana for two trumpets and orchestra
- John Addison, Concerto for trumpet, strings and percussion (1958)
- Tomaso Albinoni, Sonata a sei con tromba in C major (for trumpet, 2 violins, 2 violas and basso continuo)

Sinfonia in D major for the first act of Zenobia (for trumpet, 2 violins, 2 violas, cello and basso continuo)
"Vien con nuova orribil guerra" from La Statira for soprano, 2 trumpets, 2 oboes, strings and continuo

- Leroy Anderson, A Trumpeter's Lullaby
- Malcolm Arnold, Trumpet Concerto
- Richard Ayres, No. 31 (NONcerto for trumpet)
- Alexander Arutiunian, Trumpet Concerto in A♭ major (1950)
- Nicolas Bacri, Concerto Episodes for trumpet and orchestra
- Luciano Berio, Kol-Od (Chemins VI)
- Harrison Birtwistle, Endless Parade, for trumpet, vibraphone and strings
- Herbert Blendinger, Concerto barocco for trumpet and orchestra (1977)
- Ernest Bloch, Proclamation
- Oskar Böhme, Concerto for Trumpet, Op. 18
- Yevgeny Brusilovsky, Concerto for trumpet and orchestra
- Howard J. Buss, Skylines for trumpet and orchestra
- Dimitrije Bužarovski, Concerto for trumpet and strings Op. 58
- Domenico Cimarosa, Trumpet Concerto in C Major (transcribed from Oboe Concerto)
- Jeremiah Clarke, Suite in D
- Aaron Copland, Quiet City for trumpet, English horn and strings
- Joseph Curiale, Blue Windows
- Peter Maxwell Davies, Trumpet Concerto

Strathclyde Concerto No. 3, for horn, trumpet, and orchestra

- Alfred Desenclos, Incantation, Threne et Danse
- Péter Eötvös, Jet Stream

Snatches of a Conversation, for double-bell trumpet, speaker, and ensemble

- Thierry Escaich, Résurgences for trumpet and orchestra
- Harold Farberman, Double Concerto for Single Trumpet
- Gala Flagello, Persist for two trumpets and chamber orchestra
- Johann Friedrich Fasch, Trumpet Concerto in D Major, FWV L:D1
- Lorenzo Ferrero, Two Cathedrals in the South, concertino for trumpet and string orchestra
- Petronio Franceschini, Sonata in D major for 2 trumpets, strings and continuo
- Baldassare Galuppi, Alla tromba della Fama for soprano, trumpet, strings and continuo
- Michael Gilbertson (composer), Concerto for trumpet and orchestra
- Alexander Goedicke, Concert Etude for Trumpet and Orchestra, Op. 49
- Edward Gregson, Concerto for Trumpet, Strings and Timpani
- HK Gruber, Aerial
- Joachim Gruner, Concerto for Trumpet and Orchestra No. 1
- Iain Hamilton, Circus for two trumpets and orchestra
- George Frideric Handel, Overture to "Atalanta" for trumpet and orchestra

Trumpet Concerto No. 9 in B♭ Major
Mr. Handel's Celebrated Water Piece, for trumpet and strings

- Joseph Haydn, Trumpet Concerto in E flat major
- Michael Haydn, Trumpet Concerto in C major, MH 60

Trumpet Concerto in D major, MH 104

- Bernhard Heiden, Concerto Music for trumpet and orchestra
- Hans Werner Henze, Requiem
- Johann Wilhelm Hertel, Double Concerto in E♭ Major for trumpet and oboe
- Jacques Hétu, Concerto for trumpet and small orchestra, Op. 43
- Arthur Honegger, Symphony No. 2 for strings and trumpet
- Alan Hovhaness, Prayer of St. Gregory, Op. 62b, for B♭ trumpet and strings (or organ)
- Johann Nepomuk Hummel, Trumpet Concerto in E major
- Charles Ives, The Unanswered Question for trumpet and orchestra
- André Jolivet, Concertino for Trumpet, Strings and Piano

Trumpet Concerto No. 2

- Jan Kapr, Omaggio alla Tromba for 2 trumpets and orchestra
- Peter Jona Korn, Concerto for trumpet
- Hanna Kulenty, Trumpet Concerto
- Raoul Laparra, Suite Italienne
- Lowell Liebermann, Concerto for Trumpet and Orchestra, Op. 64
- James MacMillan, Epiclesis
- Frank Martin, Concerto for seven wind instruments, timpani, percussion, and string orchestra (1949)
- Martín Matalon, Trame V
- Darius Milhaud, Symphonie concertante for bassoon, horn, trumpet, double bass and orchestra, Op.376

La couronne de gloire, Cantata for voice and chamber ensemble (flute, trumpet, strings), Op. 211

- Johann Molter, Trumpet Concerto No. 1 in D
- Paul Moravec, Songs of Love and War for baritone, trumpet, chorus and strings
- Leopold Mozart, Trumpet Concerto in D major
- Johann Baptist Georg Neruda, Concerto in E♭ for Trumpet and Strings
- Olga Neuwirth, ... miramondo multiplo..., for C and piccolo trumpets and orchestra
- Christopher Norton, Concertino for trumpet and strings
- Sean O'Boyle, Lonseome Prairie
- Andrzej Panufnik, Concerto in modo antico for trumpet, 2 harps, harpsichord, and strings
- Arvo Pärt, Concerto Piccolo über B-A-C-H for trumpet, strings, harpsichord and piano
- Stephen Paulus, Concerto for Two Trumpets and Orchestra
- Giacomo Antonio Perti, Sinfonia to 'L'Inganno scoperto per Vendetta' (1691) for trumpet, strings and basso continuo
- Matthias Pintscher, Celestial Object I for trumpet and ensemble

Occultation for solo horn, solo trumpet and ensemble

- Anthony Plog, Trumpet Concerto no. 1
- Amilcare Ponchielli, Concerto for trumpet and wind band in F
- Gerhard Präsent Himmelslicht concerto for trumpet and orchestra
- Henry Purcell, Sonata, Trumpet and Strings Z.850
- Erkegali Rakhmadiyev, Concerto for trumpet and orchestra
- Franz Richter, Trumpet Concerto in D Major
- Wolfgang Rihm, Marsyas Rhapsody for Trumpet, Percussion & Orchestra
- Vivian Adelberg Rudow, Dark Waters
- Aulis Sallinen, Sunrise Serenade Op. 63, 2 trumpets, piano and string orchestra
- David Sampson, Serenade for flugelhorn and orchestra
- R. Murray Schafer, The Falcon's Trumpet
- Rodion Konstantinovich Shchedrin, Concerto for trumpet and orchestra
- Dmitri Shostakovich, Concerto in C minor for piano, trumpet, and string orchestra, Op. 35
- Karlheinz Stockhausen, Michaels Reise um die Erde for trumpet and orchestra
- Simon Stockhausen, Windschatten for flugelhorn, orchestra and electronics
- Gottfried Heinrich Stölzel, Concerto for trumpet in D
- Germaine Tailleferre, Sinfonietta for trumpet, strings and tympani
- Giuseppe Tartini, Trumpet Concerto in D
- Georg Philipp Telemann, Trumpet Concerto No. 1 in D Major TWV51:D7

Concerto for 2 oboes and trumpet in D Major TWV 53:D2
Sonata for trumpet and strings in D Major, TWV 41:DA3 also known as Quintet for trumpet, violins, viola and continuo in D, TWV44:1
Trumpet Concerto in C Minor (Oboe concerto transcribed by M. Andre) TWV51:c1

- Henri Tomasi, Concerto for trumpet and orchestra
- Giuseppe Torelli, Sinfonia con tromba

Trumpet Concerto in D Major

- Fisher Tull, Rhapsody for trumpet and orchestra
- Mark-Anthony Turnage, From the Wreckage

Dispelling the Fears for two trumpets and orchestra

- Antonio Vivaldi, Concerto for two trumpets and strings in C major, RV 537

"Combatta un gentil cor" from Tito Manlio for soprano, trumpet, strings and continuo RV 738

- John Williams, Trumpet Concerto
- Luigi Zaninelli, Aria festiva for trumpet, trumpet choir and orchestra

Autumn Music, for trumpet and strings

- Marc'Antonio Ziani, "Trombe d'Ausonia" from La Flora for soprano, trumpet and continuo
- Bernd Alois Zimmermann, Nobody Knows De Trouble I See, for trumpet and orchestra

== Trumpet and wind ensemble ==
- Mary Jeanne van Appledorn, Concerto for trumpet and band
- Jerry Bilik, Concerto for trumpet and band
- Larry Bitensky, Awake You Sleepers for trumpet and wind ensemble

The Closing of the Gates for trumpet and wind ensemble

- Henry Brant, Concerto for alto saxophone or trumpet and nine instruments
- Robert Farnon, Blow the Wind Southerly for trumpet and wind symphony
- Jean Françaix, Le Gai Paris for trumpet and orchestral wind ensemble
- Alan Hovhaness, Return and Rebuild the Desolate Places for trumpet and wind orchestra
- Karel Husa, Concerto for trumpet and wind orchestra
- Jukka Linkola, Tango-Tarantella for trumpet and symphonic band
- John Mackey, Antique Violences: Concerto for Trumpet with winds, brass, and percussion
- Daniel Pinkham, Serenades for solo trumpet and wind ensemble
- Alfred Reed, Concerto for trumpet and winds
- Jerzy Sapieyevski, Concerto for trumpet and winds
- Alec Wilder, Concerto No. 1 for trumpet and wind ensemble

Concerto No. 2 for trumpet, flugelhorn and wind ensemble

== Electroacoustic ==
- Howard J. Buss, "Alien Loop de Loops" for trumpet and electronic recording (fixed media) Brixton Publications
- Christopher Cerrone, How to Breathe Underwater for male voice, bass clarinet, trumpet, trombone, pre-recorded electronics
- Charles Dodge, Extensions for trumpet and tape
- Jonathan Harvey, Ricarcare una Melodia for trumpet and tape-delay system
- Jouni Kaipainen, Altaforte, op. 18
- Hannah Lash, Secrets for trumpet and tape
- Henri Lazarof, Concertazioni for trumpet, 6 instruments and 4-channel tape
- Olga Neuwirth, Addio...sognando for trumpet and tape
- Andrew Powell, Plasmogeny II for trumpet, live electronics and tape
- Roger Reynolds, The Serpent-Snapping Eye for trumpet, percussion, piano and tape
- David Sampson, Breakaway for 2 trumpets and electronics
- Annette Schlünz, Copeaux, éclisses for oboe, bass clarinet, trumpet, cello and electronics
- Elliott Schwartz, Music for Napoleon and Beethoven for trumpet, piano and 2 tapes
- Roger Smalley, Echo III for trumpet with tape delay
- Karlheinz Stockhausen, Aries for C trumpet and tape

Pietà for quarter-tone flugelhorn, soprano and tape
Trompete for C trumpet and tape

== Theatrical roles ==
- Karlheinz Stockhausen, Donnerstag aus Licht (Michael)

Samstag aus Licht (Michael)
Dienstag aus Licht (Michael)
Sonntag aus Licht (Michael)

- Isabel Mundry, Ein Atemzug – die Odyssee (Odysseus)

== Famous orchestral excerpts ==
- Johann Sebastian Bach, Magnificat
- Béla Bartók, Concerto for Orchestra
- Ludwig van Beethoven, Leonore Overture No. 2

Leonore Overture No. 3

- George Frideric Handel, Messiah
- Gustav Mahler, Symphony No. 3

Symphony No. 5
Symphony No. 8

- Modest Mussorgsky, Pictures at an Exhibition (orch. Ravel)
- Maurice Ravel, Piano Concerto in G
- Ottorino Respighi, Pines of Rome
- Nikolai Rimsky-Korsakov, Scheherazade
- Alexander Scriabin, The Poem of Ecstasy
- Richard Strauss, Ein Heldenleben

Don Juan

- Igor Stravinsky, Petrushka
  The Firebird
- Richard Wagner, Parsifal
