= Trumpet Concerto =

Trumpet Concerto may refer to:

- Trumpet concerto, a concerto for solo trumpet and instrumental ensemble
- Trumpet Concerto (Arutiunian)
- Trumpet Concerto (Davies)
- Trumpet Concerto (Grime)
- Trumpet Concerto (Haydn)
- Trumpet Concerto (Michael Haydn)
- Trumpet Concerto (Hummel)
- Trumpet Concerto (Leopold Mozart)
- Trumpet Concerto (Mozart)
- Trumpet Concerto (Musgrave)

== Others ==
- Concerto for Two Trumpets (Vivaldi)
