= Trumpet concerto =

Musical work for solo trumpet and ensemble

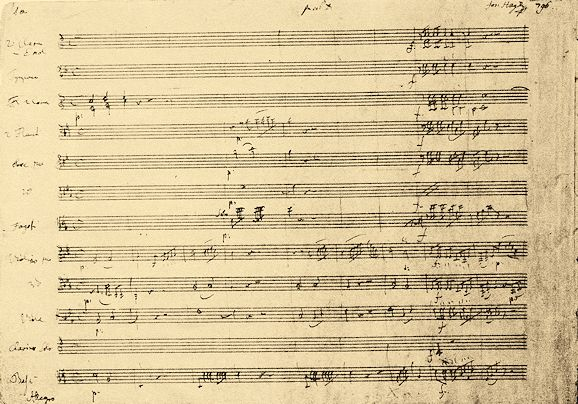
First page of the autograph of the Haydn's Trumpet Concerto

A trumpet concerto is a concerto for solo trumpet and instrumental ensemble, customarily the orchestra. Such works have been written from the Baroque period, when the solo concerto form was first developed, up through the present day. Although comparatively rare compared to concertos for other instruments, some major composers have contributed to the trumpet concerto repertoire, such as Joseph Haydn in his Trumpet Concerto in E♭.

Traditionally a three-movement work, the modern-day trumpet concerto has occasionally been structured in four or more movements. In some trumpet concertos, especially from the Baroque and modern eras, the trumpet is accompanied by a chamber ensemble rather than an orchestra.

== Selected list of trumpet concertos ==
The following concertos are presently found near the centre of the mainstream Western repertoire for the trumpet.

=== Baroque era ===
Brandenburg Concerto No. 2
I. Allegro

II. Andante

III. Allegro assai
Performed by the Lexington Bach Choir Orchestra with Vince DiMartino (trumpet), Arnold (flute), Rennick (oboe), and Saunders (violin)

Johann Sebastian Bach

- Brandenburg Concerto No. 2 (Solo part for trumpet)

Joseph Arnold Gross

- Trumpet Concerto in D major

Johann Friedrich Fasch

- Concerto for trumpet and two oboes in D major

Johann Georg Reutter

- Trumpet Concerto in D major

Franz Xavier Richter

- Trumpet Concerto in D major

Antonio Vivaldi

- Concerto for Two Trumpets RV 537

Francesco Onofrio Manfredini

- Concerto for Two Trumpets in D major

Giuseppe Torelli

- Trumpet Concerto in D, G.9

Johann Christoph Graupner

- Trumpet Concerto in D major

Franz Querfurth

- Trumpet Concerto in E♭ major

Johann Wilhelm Hertel

- Trumpet Concerto No. 1 in E♭ major
- Trumpet Concerto No. 2 in E♭ major
- Concerto for Trumpet and Oboe in E♭ major

Joseph Riepel

- Trumpet Concerto in D major

Valentin Rathgeber

- Concerto for Two Trumpets in E♭. Op. 6 No. 15

Johann Melchior Molter

- Trumpet Concerto No. 1 in D major MWV 6.32
- Trumpet Concerto No. 2 in D major MWV 6.33
- Trumpet Concerto No. 3 in D major MWV 6.34
- Concerto for Two Trumpets No. 1 in D major MWV 6.27
- Concerto for Two Trumpets No. 2 in D major MWV 6.28
- Concerto for Two Trumpets No. 3 in D major MWV 6.29
- Concerto for Two Trumpets No. 4 in D major MWV 6.30
- Concerto for Two Trumpets No. 5 in D major MWV 6.31

Georg Philipp Telemann

- Trumpet Concerto in D major TWV 51:D7

=== Classical era ===
Laue (fl. c. 1760)

- Trumpet Concerto in D major

Otto (fl. c. 1770)

- Trumpet Concerto in E♭ major

Joseph Haydn

- Trumpet Concerto in E♭ major (keyed trumpet)

Michael Haydn

- Trumpet Concerto in C major (natural trumpet)
- Trumpet Concerto in D major

Johann Baptist Neruda

- Trumpet Concerto in E♭ major (corno-da-caccia)

Johann Nepomuk Hummel

- Trumpet Concerto in E major (keyed trumpet)

Leopold Mozart

- Trumpet Concerto in D major (natural trumpet)

Wolfgang Amadeus Mozart

- Trumpet Concerto, K. 47c (1768, lost)

=== Romantic era ===
Amilcare Ponchielli

- Concerto for trumpet and wind band in F

Oskar Böhme

- Trumpet Concerto in F minor (originally in E minor)

=== Modern era ===
Kalevi Aho

- Concerto for trumpet and symphonic wind orchestra (2011)

Harry James

- Concerto for Trumpet (1939)

Alexander Arutunian

- Trumpet Concerto in A♭ major (1950)

Alfred Baum

- Concerto for Trumpet, Piano, Timpani and strings (1959/60)

Herbert Blendinger

- Concerto barocco for trumpet and orchestra, Op. 33 (1977)

Peter Maxwell Davies

- Trumpet Concerto (1988)

Duke Ellington

- Concerto for Cootie

Michael Gilbertson

- Trumpet Concerto (2017)

Geoffrey Gordon

- CHASE – A Concerto for Trumpet and Orchestra after Giacometti (2017)

Helen Grime

- Trumpet Concerto, night-sky-blue (2022)

Heinz Karl Gruber

- Aerial, Concerto for trumpet and orchestra (1998–99), composed for Håkan Hardenberger

Robin Haigh

- LUCK, Concerto for trumpet and orchestra (2024)

Steve Heitzeg

- American Nomad (concerto for trumpet and orchestra, 2015)

André Jolivet

- Concertino for trumpet, piano, and orchestra (1948)
- Concerto for trumpet (1954)

Lowell Liebermann

- Concerto for trumpet and orchestra, Op. 74 (2001)

John Mackey

- Antique Violences: Concerto for Trumpet (2017)

Ennio Morricone

- UT for trumpet, timpani, bass drum and string orchestra

Thea Musgrave

- Trumpet Concerto (2019)

William P. Perry

- Concerto for trumpet and orchestra

Gerhard Präsent

- Heaven´s Light (Himmelslicht), concerto for trumpet and orchestra

Christopher Rouse

- Heimdall's Trumpet (2012)

Kaija Saariaho

- HUSH (2023)

Philip Sawyers

- Concerto for trumpet, strings and timpani (2018) (Nimbus NI 6374)

R. Murray Schafer

- The Falcon's Trumpet

Frank Ticheli

- Concerto for trumpet and orchestra, composed for Armando Ghitalla (1990)

Henri Tomasi

- Concerto for trumpet and orchestra (1948)

Mieczysław Weinberg

- Trumpet Concerto in B♭ major, Op. 94 (1968)

Jörg Widmann

- Towards Paradise (2021)

Grace Williams

- Concerto for trumpet and orchestra (1963)

John Williams

- Concerto for trumpet and orchestra (1996)

Joe Wolfe

- Concerto for trumpet and orchestra (2003)

Ellen Taaffe Zwilich

- American Concerto (1994)
