= Musical repertoire =

Set of prepared musical compositions

Musical repertoire is a collection of music pieces played by an individual musician or ensemble, composed for a particular instrument or group of instruments, voice, or choir, or from a particular period or area.

== See also ==
- Brass quintet repertoire
- Classical guitar repertoire
- Euphonium repertoire
- Flute repertory
- Organ repertoire
- Piano trio repertoire
- String instrument repertoire
- Trumpet repertoire
