= Karim Haddad =

Lebanese composer (born 1962)

Karim Haddad (born January 22, 1962, in Dar-el Mraisseh, Beirut, Lebanon) is a Lebanese composer specializing in contemporary and computer-assisted music, renowned for his innovative use of non-tempered spaces, temporal poetics, and electronic elements in orchestral and operatic works. Based in Paris since 1982, he has developed tools for computer music environments and contributed to institutions like IRCAM, where his compositions blend philosophy, literature, and advanced technology.

Haddad's early education was shaped by the Lebanese Civil War; he studied clarinet at the National Conservatory of Beirut until its closure in 1975, followed by philosophy and literature at the American University of Beirut.In Paris, he earned six prizes and an advanced degree in composition with honors from the Conservatoire National Supérieur de Musique et de Danse de Paris (CNSMDP), studying under composers such as Alain Bancquart, Paul Mefano, and Klaus Huber. He attended master classes with Karlheinz Stockhausen, Emmanuel Nunes, and Brian Ferneyhough at the Darmstadt Summer Courses in 1992 and 1994, and completed IRCAM's computer music course in 1995, after which he exclusively used computer tools for his creations.

His career highlights include serving as head of technical support for the IRCAM Forum since 2000 and lecturing at the CNSMDP, while developing interfaces for OpenMusic, Csound, Finale, and Lilypond. Haddad's works have been performed by ensembles such as Itinéraire, 2e2m, the Diotima Quartet, and the Orchestre Philharmonique de Radio-France at festivals including Présences and IRCAM's Agora. Notable compositions include the short opera Seven Attempted Escapes from Silence (2005, libretto by Jonathan Safran Foer), premiered at the Staatsoper Berlin; Noch eins ist aber zu sagen... (commissioned by Radio France, for two sopranos, ensemble, and electronics); ... and the leaves are full of voices ... (2000, for solo violin); Rumeurs d'étoiles (1993, for octet of cellos); and Ce qui dort dans l'ombre sacrée (1995, for double bass and live electronics, in memoriam Nada Adib Haddad).

== Early Life and Education ==
=== Early Years in Beirut ===
Karim Haddad was born on January 22, 1962, in Beirut, Lebanon.[1]

From an early age, Haddad displayed a keen interest in music, beginning studies at the National Conservatory of Beirut where he focused on the clarinet. These formative lessons were abruptly halted in 1975 when the conservatory closed due to the outbreak of the Lebanese Civil War, which profoundly disrupted cultural and educational life in the city.

Amid the ongoing conflict, Haddad pursued studies in philosophy and literature at the American University of Beirut, navigating the challenges of wartime instability.

In 1995, Haddad dedicated the work Ce qui dort dans l'ombre sacrée ("In memoriam Nada Adib Haddad") for double bass and live electronics.

=== Formal Musical and Academic Training ===
In 1982, Karim Haddad moved from Beirut to Paris, where he enrolled at the Conservatoire National Supérieur de Musique et de Danse de Paris (CNSMDP). There, he earned six premier prix in harmony, counterpoint, fugue, orchestration, analysis, and composition between 1990 and 1994, along with a Diplôme Supérieur de Composition with honors in 1994.[5] His studies at the CNSMDP were guided by composers Alain Bancquart, Paul Mefano, and Klaus Huber, whose influences shaped his early explorations into non-tempered harmonic spaces and temporal structures in music.

Haddad furthered his training through international workshops, attending master classes with Karlheinz Stockhausen, Brian Ferneyhough, and Emmanuel Nunes at the Darmstadt Summer Courses (Ferienkurse für Neue Musik), where he received scholarships in 1992 and 1994. These experiences exposed him to avant-garde compositional techniques and reinforced his interest in complex rhythmic and formal innovations.

In 1995, Haddad completed IRCAM's Cursus in computer-assisted musical composition, a pivotal step that led him to integrate digital tools exclusively into his creative process from that point onward. Complementing his practical training, he obtained a licence (B.A. equivalent) in musicology from Paris-Sorbonne University (Paris IV) in 1986 and culminated his academic pursuits with a doctorate in musical composition from Sorbonne University in 2020, in collaboration with IRCAM, emphasizing theoretical advancements in temporal organization. This formal education built upon his foundational clarinet studies in Beirut, providing the technical rigor for his later innovations in computer music.

== Professional Career ==
=== Initial Compositions and Move to Paris ===
After completing his studies in philosophy and literature at the American University of Beirut amid the Lebanese civil war, Karim Haddad relocated to Paris in 1982 to continue his musical education. There, he earned a B.A. in musicology from the Sorbonne University and subsequently obtained six prizes, along with an advanced diploma in composition with honors, from the Conservatoire National Supérieur de Musique et de Danse de Paris (CNSMDP), studying under Alain Bancquart, Paul Mefano, and others. This period marked an intense engagement with non-tempered musical spaces and their intersections with temporal poetics, influenced by his philosophical background.

Haddad's earliest dated compositions date to 1989, showcasing initial explorations in solo piano writing. These include 47 lat. Nord, 3 long. Ouest , a 6-minute unpublished piece for solo piano, and Lang ist das Leben... , a 13-minute unpublished work for the same instrumentation, both reflecting tentative forays into abstract temporal structures. By 1991, his output shifted toward chamber and electronic forms, as seen in Des ciels gris de cristal, a 12-minute unpublished chamber piece for four instruments (alto flute, B-flat clarinet, violin, and cello), and La prédestination au labyrinthe ou de la tellurique de l'esprit , a 9-minute electronic tape piece emphasizing spatial and conceptual abstraction. These works premiered in the early 1990s, with La prédestination receiving its first performance in October 1992 at the CNSMDP in Paris, and Des ciels gris de cristal in June 1994 in Gif-sur-Yvette, performed by Pierre-Yves Artaud and ensemble.

In 1993, Haddad composed several pieces drawing on philosophical themes, including '...et...' , a 12-minute unpublished orchestral work; Rumeurs d'étoiles , a 13-minute unpublished piece for cello octet, premiered in November 1994 by L'Atelier Instrumental du Conservatoire under Alain Bancquart at the CNSMDP; and Was ist das -"ist"? , a 17-minute unpublished solo violin composition. These early performances, often by small ensembles at Parisian conservatories and contemporary music venues, helped establish Haddad's presence in French new music circles. His participation in the Darmstadt Ferienkurse für Neue Musik fellowships in 1992 and 1994 further catalyzed this emerging style.

=== Role at IRCAM and Research Contributions ===
Karim Haddad's engagement with IRCAM began in 1995 when he participated in the institute's computer music Cursus, marking his entry into the field of computer-assisted composition. In 1999, he developed the Om2Csound library, which enables control of Csound synthesis directly within the OpenMusic environment, facilitating seamless integration of algorithmic composition with sound synthesis for composers. That same year, he also authored the OpenMusic Reference and Tutorial, serving as a key resource for users of the software.

In 2000, Haddad was appointed head of technical support for the IRCAM Forum, where he provided expertise in computer music tools to support composers and researchers worldwide. In this role, he advised on the practical application of software like OpenMusic and contributed to the forum's educational and technical initiatives.

To address limitations in musical notation workflows, Haddad created the Omlily library, which interfaces OpenMusic with the LilyPond notation system, allowing bidirectional exchange of musical structures such as chord sequences, voices, and polyrhythms. This tool bridges the gap between algorithmic generation in OpenMusic and professional score engraving in LilyPond, supporting complex notations like polymetrics, irrational measures, and breakpoint functions for enhanced composition-to-performance pipelines. Developed in collaboration with Carlos Agon at IRCAM, Omlily is open-source and has been presented at conferences like TENOR 2016, emphasizing its role in experimental contemporary music notation.

In 2015, Haddad joined IRCAM's Musical Representations team as a scientist, taking oversight of the ongoing development of the OpenMusic environment, which remains a cornerstone for visual programming in computer-assisted composition. His work in this capacity has focused on advancing representations of musical time and structure within the software. In 2020, he completed a doctorate in musical composition at the Sorbonne University.

Haddad's theoretical contributions include publications exploring temporal concepts in composition software, such as the chapter "Livre Premier de Motets: The Time-Block Concept in OpenMusic," which introduces a framework for manipulating time-blocks—discrete temporal units—as modular elements for building complex rhythmic and durational architectures. This approach leverages OpenMusic's functional programming to enable recursive transformations and proportional relations, influencing how composers model musical time. He has also co-authored works on rhythmic structures, including "Representation and Rendering of Rhythmic Structures" (2002) with Carlos Agon and Gérard Assayag.

== Major Compositions ==
=== Chamber and Orchestral Works ===
Karim Haddad's chamber and orchestral compositions emphasize acoustic instrumental textures alongside occasional electronic elements, drawing on poetic and philosophical sources to explore themes of exile, memory, and transience. Influenced by his studies in philosophy and literature in Beirut, Haddad's writing for ensembles evolved from intimate chamber settings in the 1990s to broader orchestral gestures in later works, often evoking Hölderlin's reflections on time and becoming. His pieces prioritize timbral subtlety and structural poetics in formations ranging from solo instruments to full ensembles, with hybrid acoustic-electronic integrations in select works. Performances by groups such as the Itinéraire ensemble, 2e2m, and the Diotima Quartet have featured prominently at festivals including Présences de Radio France.

A pivotal early orchestral work is Noch eins ist aber zu sagen... (1997, 33 minutes), scored for two sopranos, flute (doubling bass flute), bass clarinet (doubling contrabass clarinet), horn, trombone, electric guitar, string orchestra, and electronics. Commissioned by Radio France, it premiered in June 1999 with the Orchestre Philharmonique de Radio-France conducted by Laurent Cuniot and inaugurates Haddad's Das Werden im Vergehen cycle, inspired by Friedrich Hölderlin's poem of the same name, which contemplates poetic endurance amid loss.

Among his chamber highlights, I can only say, there we have been: but I cannot say where (1998, 13 minutes) features double bass soloist with ensemble, premiered in December 1999 in Dijon by Jean-Pierre Robert and the Dijon ensemble. This piece, drawing from T.S Eliott's reflections on ineffable experience, underscores themes of elusive memory through sparse, resonant textures. Similarly, ...und wozu Dichter in durftiger Zeit?... (2002, 15 minutes) for twelve instruments and electronics engages Hölderlin's question on the poet's role in scarcity, employing layered instrumental dialogues to evoke philosophical introspection.

Later chamber works include the Adagio for string quartet (2003, 5 minutes), premiered in September 2004 at Radio France by the Diotima Quartet, which distills contemplative lyricism in a compact, elegiac form. In 2008, Wo wollen wir bleiben?... (string quintet, in memoriam Mahmoud Darwish) premiered on March 10, 2009, with the Itinéraire ensemble in Paris; its introspective lines meditate on displacement and legacy, aligning with Haddad's recurring motifs of exile. These compositions collectively demonstrate Haddad's command of ensemble writing, where poetic sources inform a sound world blending acoustic and electronic elements with quiet intensity and structural elegance.

Notable among his chamber works is also Rumeurs d'étoiles (1993, 13 minutes) for octet of cellos, dedicated to Klaus Huber which evokes stellar whispers through resonant cello textures.

=== Electronic and Vocal Pieces ===
Karim Haddad's engagement with electronic and vocal elements began prominently after his participation in IRCAM's Cursus in 1995, marking a shift toward computer-assisted composition techniques that enabled precise manipulation of temporal structures and spatial acoustics in his music. These methods, often leveraging tools like the Om2Csound library for synthesizing sounds within the OpenMusic environment, allowed Haddad to explore hybrid forms blending live performance with processed electronics. His works in this domain emphasize sonic experimentation, drawing on memorial themes and poetic introspection to create immersive auditory landscapes.

Among his early electronic pieces, Ce qui dort dans l'ombre sacrée (1995, 7 minutes) stands out as a dedication in memoriam Nada Adib Haddad, featuring solo double bass intertwined with live electronics to evoke shadowy, sacred resonances. This was followed by In te anime meus tempora metior (1997, 13 minutes), part of the cycle Das Werden im Vergehen , which incorporates mezzo-soprano voice alongside horn, electric guitar, double bass, bass drum, and electronics; it was first recorded in May 1999 for France Musique, performed by vocalist Isabel Soccoja and an ensemble including Pierre-Yves Bens on horn. These compositions highlight Haddad's initial forays into integrating acoustic instruments with real-time electronic processing for enhanced expressive depth.

Haddad further developed vocal-electronic hybrids in works like No one to speak their names (now that they are gone) (2000, 11 minutes), available in versions for two bass clarinets and string trio with electronics, or electric guitar and string trio with electronics; this piece reflects on absence and memory through layered, processed timbres. A later example, Alles ist innig (2009, 40 minutes), combines Cristal Baschet (a friction-based glass instrument), violin, cello, and fixed tape, fostering intimate dialogues between organic sounds and electronic textures. In pure electronic formats, Haddad produced Ash-Wednesday (1998, 7 minutes) and Unus dies par omni est (1998, 34 minutes), both realized as tape pieces that utilize computer-generated materials to investigate cyclical time and liturgical motifs without live performers. These tape works exemplify his post-1995 emphasis on algorithmic approaches to rhythm and space. Performances of his electronic and vocal pieces have occurred at IRCAM's Agora festival, such as a 2011 rendition of Ce qui dort dans l'ombre sacrée , and by contemporary ensembles, underscoring their role in advancing sonic experimentation.

A significant vocal work is the short opera Seven Attempted Escapes from Silence (2005, libretto by Jonathan Safran Foer), premiered at the Staatsoper Berlin in September 2005, blending orchestral, vocal, and electronic elements in a narrative of attempted communication.

== Operatic and Scenic Works ==
=== First Opera: Seven Attempted Escapes from Silence ===
First Attempted Escape from Silence is Karim Haddad's debut opera, conceived as a multi-act work that philosophically explores human attempts to break free from silence through narrative and sonic means. The libretto, written by Jonathan Safran Foer, structures the drama around recitation without traditional dialogue, featuring protagonists who speak an incomprehensible language, emphasizing themes of existential isolation and futile escape.[21] Central motifs, such as the reversed phrases "Alone" becoming "Enola" and "Did you escape?" transforming into "epaxe oy dead," underscore subliminal absence and hidden meaning, drawing from Heraclitus's idea that "hidden harmony is stronger than apparent harmony." Repetitive textual elements evolve into an invented language in sung sections, symbolizing entrapment in subterranean voids and fleeting emergences from quietude.

The opera's conceptual framework is deeply influenced by Andrei Tarkovsky's notion of "sculpting time," where temporal extension in cinema mirrors musical form's projection of infinite duration beyond discrete events, as seen in films like Stalker with its sealed, introspective spaces. Friedrich Hölderlin's prosody and metrics, particularly syllable counts from poems such as Andenken , inform the rhythmic density, treating thought itself as inherently measured and fragmented by themes of loss and remembrance. These influences converge in a non-linear layering of time, where silence serves as a void from which musical events strive to emerge, paralleling existential struggles. Haddad integrates fixed electronics, alongside spatialized sound via eight loudspeakers to create immersive audio correlations that heighten the escape motifs.

The first act, titled First Attempted Escape from Silence: Tunnels and composed in 2005, lasts 16 minutes and marks Haddad's entry into scenic music, building on his earlier vocal experiments with prosodic structures. It features a narrator (Authority, using a megaphone), two solo sopranos, a solo tenor, and a solo bass-baritone as inmates, accompanied by an ensemble of 10 to 25 instruments including clarinet, brass, percussion, electric guitar with effects, and strings, all processed through fixed electronic sounds. The act delves into themes of silence and isolation through heterophonic layers of recitation and sung interventions, derived from the libretto's prosody and segmented by textual "breaths" or silences. Prosodic proportions, such as those quantized from Hölderlin's syllable lists into tempus values like 15/8 or 24/7, are modulated via tempo shifts from irrational to binary rhythms, forming asymmetric or symmetric temporal blocks.

Technically, Haddad employed OpenMusic software to structure these temporal blocks, utilizing recursive hierarchies of Unités Temporelles (UTs) —containers defined by scale (_u_), offset (_o_), and extension (_e_)—visualized through Maquette objects for global event planning.[20] Arbres Rythmiques (Rhythm Trees) facilitated operations like circular permutations and subdivisions (e.g., proportions of 3:4:5:7), generating prosodic UTs from Hölderlin's texts and combining them with rhythmic reductions inspired by Anton Webern's Bagatelle No. 5. This approach preserved thematic density while enabling precise quantization and electronic transformations, such as filtering and autoreferential rotations, to approximate a polyphony of concurrent times.

The act premiered in 2005 at the Staatsoper Berlin as the opening segment of the opera, establishing First Attempted Escape from Silence as Haddad's landmark scenic project with its blend of vocal, instrumental, and electronic forces in an immersive staging. Subsequent performances highlighted its role in contemporary music festivals, underscoring Haddad's innovative fusion of philosophical narrative and temporal experimentation. Later acts of the opera remained conceptual explorations and were not performed.

=== Other Scenic Projects ===
Karim Haddad's scenic projects include multimedia works blending electronic sound, video, and live performance, often drawing on literary sources to probe themes of lament, identity, and introspection. One such piece is Menons Klagen um Diotima (2003), a 10-minute composition for tape and video. This multimedia work integrates fixed electronic media with projected visuals to evoke a narrative of emotional exile and fragmented selfhood, reflecting Haddad's interest in hybrid forms influenced by his IRCAM affiliations. It premiered in October 2004 at the Pergamon Museum in Berlin.

== Later Career and Legacy ==
=== Doctoral Work and Recent Activities ===
In 2015, Karim Haddad joined the Musical Representations (RepMus) team at IRCAM as a scientist while simultaneously beginning research for a doctorate in musical composition at Sorbonne Université, under the supervision of Jean- Marc Chouvel and Carlos Agon. His thesis, titled L'Unité Temporelle: Une approche pour l'écriture de la durée et de sa quantification, explored compositional processes in computer-assisted environments, particularly the conceptualization and quantification of temporal units in music writing. He defended the doctorate in 2020, integrating theoretical analysis with practical developments in tools like OpenMusic to bridge conceptual ideas and performative realization. His thesis is published by Hermann editions.

Following his doctoral completion, Haddad continued as a researcher in the RepMus team at IRCAM, focusing on advancements in OpenMusic to address notational and performative gaps in contemporary composition. A key contribution was the OMLily library, which converts OpenMusic objects—such as chord sequences and polyphonies—into LilyPond files for generating printable scores, thereby facilitating smoother transitions from digital modeling to engraved notation suitable for performance. This tool, presented at the 2016 TENOR Conference on Technologies for Music Notation, exemplifies his ongoing efforts to enhance the environment's capabilities for complex rhythmic and microtonal notations.

Post-2020, Haddad has sustained his dual role in composition and software development at IRCAM, contributing to updates like OpenMusic 7.6 (released November 2024), which introduced features for equal divisions and improved microtonal playback.[26] His recent research includes collaborative work on functional programming paradigms in musical computing, such as the 2024 paper "The Maquette Monad," co-authored with Carlos Agon and Gonzalo Romero-García, which proposes a monadic structure for managing hierarchical musical sketches (maquettes) in OpenMusic. Presented at the 2024 Functional and (Abstracting) Meta-Programming (FARM) workshop, this work advances scalable representations for compositional experimentation. These activities underscore his commitment to evolving computer-aided composition tools amid ongoing IRCAM projects, with a recent emphasis on research over new compositions.

=== Influences and Impact ===
Karim Haddad's compositional approach was profoundly shaped by the Lebanese civil war and his subsequent education in philosophy and literature, informing themes of transience and temporal flux evident in literary inspirations like Friedrich Hölderlin's poetry, which served as the basis for works like the cycle Das Werden im Vergehen and pieces such as ...und wozu Dichter in dürftiger Zeit... . Mentors during his Paris training at the Conservatoire National Supérieur de Musique, including Alain Bancquart, Paul Mefano, Emmanuel Nunes and Klaus Huber, along with workshops at the Darmstadt Ferienkurse für Neue Musik in 1992 and 1994, exposed him to avant-garde and post-serialist techniques, further refining his focus on non-tempered spaces and temporal poetics.[13][8] Additionally, Karlheinz Stockhausen's essay "...wie die Zeit vergeht..." influenced Haddad's "spectral-time" methods, where frequency-domain analysis translates into time-based structures like durations and gestures, bridging acoustic and electronic elements.

Haddad's impact on contemporary music stems from his pioneering role in computer-assisted composition at IRCAM, where, following his 1995 Cursus, he developed tools like the Om2Csound library for OpenMusic, enabling seamless integration of synthesis (e.g., Csound) with notation software such as Finale and Lilypond. These innovations have advanced electroacoustic practices by facilitating the translation of sound analysis data—such as amplitude envelopes or partial-tracking models—into symbolic musical parameters, including rhythms and dynamics, thus enhancing formal fusions in hybrid acoustic-electronic works. His compositions, performed by prestigious ensembles like Ensemble Itinéraire, 2e2m, the Diotima Quartet, and the Orchestre Philharmonique de Radio-France at festivals including Présences and IRCAM's Agora, have elevated Lebanese contemporary music on international stages, showcasing a diaspora perspective within Western institutions.

As a legacy, Haddad serves as a bridge between Western avant-garde traditions and broader poetic and cultural inquiries rooted in his Lebanese heritage, infusing his output with explorations of temporal and existential themes that resonate with Mediterranean identities. His contributions to OpenMusic, including rhythm tree manipulations and data-to-time algorithms, continue to influence computational music tools, promoting a "hypercomplex minimalism" that integrates analysis and notation in modern praxis. Documentation of his activities post-2011 focuses primarily on research and tool development, with limited information on recent premieres or new compositions as of 2024.
