= Otto (composer) =

18th-century composer

- Born: 18th century
- Died: 18th or 19th century
- Occupation: Composer

Otto (first name unknown, sometimes referred to as Luigi Otto or Johann Otto; fl. 18th century) was a composer of the early classical period.

== Life and work ==
The composer Otto is known for his trumpet concerto in E-flat Major, which is dated about 1770. The original performing parts are indicated dell Sign^{e} Otto on the title page. The only surviving copy of the composition is held in the Fürst zu Bentheimsche Musikaliensammlung Burgsteinfurt, now in the custody of the Universitäts- und Landesbibliothek Münster. It is documented that the copies were acquired on behalf of Count Louis of Bentheim and Steinfurt by the court chapel's trumpeter named Preger. Together with another trumpet concerto from a likewise unknown composer named Signor Laue, the sheet music arrived in December 1803 from Gotha. However, as Preger left the chapel already in 1804, and the parts are in an almost untouched condition, it seems possible that both concertos may have never been performed in the concert hall of the Steinfurter Bagno.

Nothing is currently known about Otto's life. Since the first recording of his concerto in 1981, he is referred to as Luigi Otto in most releases, although there seems to exist no source for the first name. The Répertoire International des Sources Musicales (RISM) associates Otto with a certain Johann (Giovanni) Otto, of whom performing parts of two symphonies have survived in the Herzog August Library in Wolfenbüttel, although the attribution is conjectural. Other musicians named "Otto", who have been proposed, include the composer Franz Otto (1730–1805) from Glatz (Silesia), the song composer Carl Otto from Mainz or the Augustinin canon Laurentius Justinianus Ott (1748–1802) from Weyarn.

The concerto has been recorded by notable trumpeters like Maurice André, Ludwig Güttler, Otto Sauter and Krisztián Kováts.

== Works ==
- Concerto a trompete solo, violino primo, violino secondo, oboe primo, oboe secondo, corno primo, corno secondo, viola et basso. (it can be played on the piccolo and also the trumpet)

== Editions ==
- Ludwig Güttler (ed.): Concerto in Es für Trompete (Clarino) und Orchester / dell Sig^{e} Otto. Piano reduction (= FH 2427). Friedrich Hofmeister, Hofheim 1998, ISMN 979-0-2034-2427-7. Also performing material (= FH 15046, only on hire).
- John Wallace, Simon Wright (Hrsg.): Luigi Otto: Trumpet Concerto in E♭. Score. (= BWP 4104S). Brass Wind Publications, Oakham 1998 (also piano reduction, BWP 4104D, orchestral parts BWP 4104SP).
- Edward H. Tarr, Arne Thielemann (eds.): Johann Otto (mid-18th century): Concerto in E-Flat Major (c. 1770) for Trompet, 2 Horns, 2 Oboes, Strings & Basso continuo. Score (= Brass collection. 50372). Martin Schmid, Nagold 2014 (also piano rduction, Brass collection. 50373).

== Discography ==
- Four Trumpet Concertos. Luigi Otto / Francesco Barsanti / Giovanni Albinoni / Georg Friedrich Händel. Maurice André, Württembergisches Kammerorchester, Jörg Faerber. His Master's Voice 1C 067-03 974 T, 1981.
- Classical Trumpet Concertos, Vol. 2. Luigi (?) Otto, Johann Melchior Molter, Franz Xaver Richter, Johannes Matthias Sperger. Ludwig Güttler, Neues Bachisches Collegium Musicum zu Leipzig, Max Pommer. ETERNA 7 25 147, 1988. Auch: Capriccio 10 051, 1988.
- Wiederentdeckter Barock – Fünf Trompetenkonzerte aus der Minter Sammlung Vol. 1. Joh. Samuel Endler, Joseph Riepel, Luigi (?) Otto, Franz Xaver Richter. Otto Sauter, John Wallace, Rudolf Köpp, Philharmonisches Staatsorchester Bremen, Simon Wright. G.I.B. Classics 383 7501 2, 1996.
- World of Baroque (Vol. 2). Works by Johann Melchior Molter, Johann Georg von Reutter, Luigi Otto, Joseph Riepel, Carl Friedrich Christian Fasch. Otto Sauter, Kenji Tamiya, Capella Istrapolitana, Volker Schmidt-Gertenbach. EMI Classics 7243 5 57021 2 2, 2000.
- The Mystery of the Natural Trumpet. Works by Johann Stamitz, Joseph Riepel, Johannes Matthias Sperger, Laue (here referred to as Johann Georg Lang), Johann Otto. Krisztián Kováts, L’arpa festante, Christoph Hesse, Rien Voskuilen. cpo 555 144-2, 2020.
