= OpenMusic =

Visual programming environment for musical composition

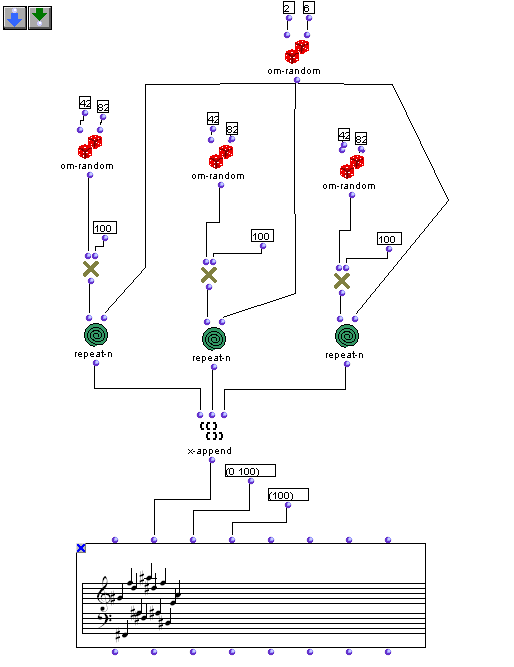
- A typical patch in OpenMusic
- Stable release: 8.0 / 30 March 2026; 30 days ago
- Operating system: Linux; macOS; Windows
- License: GPLv3
- Website: repmus.ircam.fr/openmusic/home
- Repository: github.com/openmusic-project/OM6

OpenMusic (OM) is an object-oriented visual programming environment for musical composition based on Common Lisp. It may also be used as an all-purpose visual interface to Lisp programming. At a more specialized level, a set of provided classes and libraries make it a convenient environment for music composition.

== History ==
OpenMusic is the last in a series of computer-assisted composition software designed at IRCAM. Versions of OpenMusic are currently available for macOS (PowerPC, Intel, and Apple Silicon/ARM), Windows, and Linux. The source code has been released under the GNU Lesser General Public License.

== Programming in OpenMusic ==
Programs in OpenMusic are created by connecting together (a process known as "patching") either pre-defined or user-defined modules, in a similar manner to graphical signal-processing environments such as Max/MSP or Pure Data. Unlike such environments, however, the result of an OpenMusic computation will typically be displayed in conventional music notation, which can then be directly manipulated, if so required, via an editor. A substantial body of specialized libraries has been contributed by users, which extends OpenMusic's functionality into such areas as constraint programming, aleatoric composition, spectral music, minimalist music, music theory, fractals, music information retrieval, sound synthesis etc.

== Notable users ==
- Alain Bancquart
- Marc Battier
- Brian Ferneyhough
- Joshua Fineberg
- Karim Haddad
- Rozalie Hirs
- Eres Holz
- Michael Jarrell
- Fabien Lévy
- Magnus Lindberg
- Fang Man
- Philippe Manoury
- Tristan Murail
- Kaija Saariaho
- Marco Stroppa

== Gallery ==
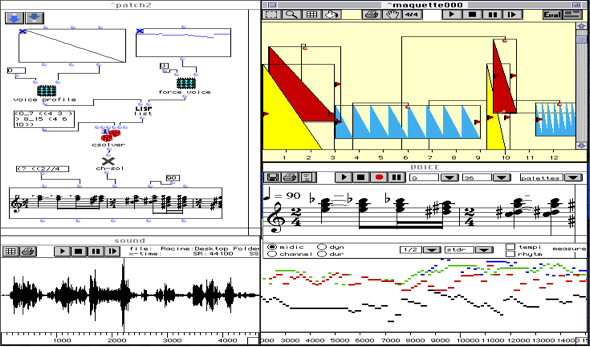
Patches and scores in OM

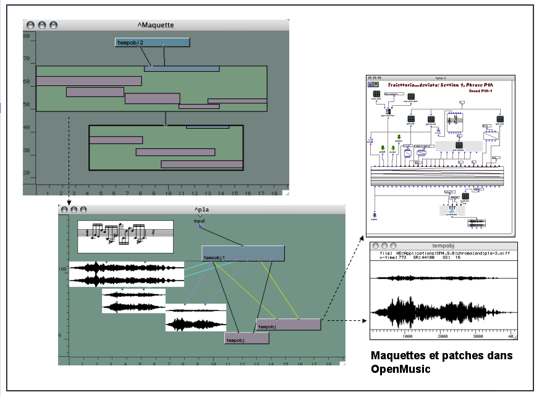
Patches and maquettes in OM
