= Sequenza X =

Composition for trumpet and piano by Luciano Berio

- by Luciano Berio
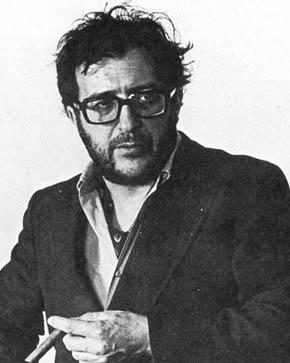
- Related: Kol-Od
- Composed: 1967
- Dedication: Ernest Fleischmann
- Published: 1984
- Scoring: trumpet; piano

Sequenza X is a composition for trumpet and piano by Luciano Berio, the tenth in his series of pieces with this title. The work was commissioned by the Los Angeles Philharmonic for Thomas Stevens, and premiered by him on November 19, 1984. The piece is dedicated to Ernest Fleischmann, managing director of the Los Angeles Philharmonic from 1969 to 1997, who convinced Berio to write a Sequenza for trumpet, despite years of resistance to the idea. Stevens received the music only nine days before the premiere.

Sequenza X is for trumpet and piano, however the piano is only used as a resonator. Berio requires the pianist to depress the keys on the piano without sounding the instrument. By playing the trumpet into the piano, the strings are made to sympathetically resonate. The effect is so subtle that the piano must be amplified for it to be heard in the auditorium. Berio prescribes a contact microphone solution in his score, whereby the microphones are secured to the underside of the sound board.

Sequenza X requires the trumpeter to employ a variety of extended techniques, including flutter tonguing, pedal tones, and valve tremolos. Much of the musical material focuses on transmuting the timbre of the instrument, often on a single pitch. Techniques such as double tonguing and doodle tonguing are interchanged rapidly and often paired with valve tremolos and hand stops. Like much of the extended technique for brass, Berio's incorporation of doodle tonguing was inspired by jazz trumpeter Clark Terry. However, he misunderstood the method, which produces a very legato, almost drunken-sounding articulation. He repeatedly asked Stevens in rehearsals for a more staccato sounding doodle tongue, eventually acquiescing when he realized it was impossible.

The range of the piece creates an endurance problem for any trumpeter. Though the tessitura is almost entirely in the standard trumpet range, the piece spans over three octaves, and notoriously requires 17 high C's to be played by the trumpeter on the final page. Though the score's lowest note is a C-sharp, Berio had originally wanted a pedal C. Stevens could not produce a pedal C at the volume Berio desired; so, the note was raised a half-step. Both Stevens and Berio agreed that the printed score should include the pedal C, but the change was never made.

The piece has become a standard in the contemporary trumpet repertoire, and has been recorded numerous times, most notably under supervision of the composer by trumpet soloist Gabriele Cassone.

Sequenza X is the basis for Berio's Kol-Od (also called Chemins VI) which adds a small ensemble to accompany the solo trumpet part. Kol-Od was premiered by Gabriele Cassone with the Ensemble InterContemporain, Pierre Boulez conducting, on April 27, 1996, in Basel, Switzerland.

== List of techniques ==
- Fluttertonguing - The first notes of the piece are fluttertongued, and Berio makes extensive use of the technique throughout.
- Doodle tonguing - Used extensively throughout the piece, it is often interchanged rapidly with fluttertonguing.
- Hand stopping - The trumpeter must produce the notated pitch, which requires a compensation due to the tendency for stopping to change the pitch. The technique is used extensively throughout the piece, and is often paired with a tremolo effect, creating a wah-wah effect.
- Valve tremolo - Used most often in rapid switches from fluttertonguing and back again.
- Pedal tone - There are 2 pedal C-sharps in the piece, only a fourth below the standard trumpet range.
- Shake - A very fast lip trill (sometimes aided by use of 'shaking' the trumpet) between two adjacent partials. This is only used once in this piece.

== Discography ==
- Graham Ashton, Baroque and Contemporary Trumpet (Virgin classics)
- Marco Blaauw, Hot: Trumpet Solo (BVHaast)
- Gabriele Cassone, Sequenzas (Deutsche Grammophon)
- Guy Few, Sequenzas I-XIV For Solo Instruments (Naxos)
- William Forman, The Complete Sequenzas, Alternate Sequenzas & Works for Solo Instruments (Mode)
- Reinhold Friedrich, Nobody Knows de Trouble I See (Capriccio)
- Håkan Hardenberger, Emotion (Philips)
