= James Stamp =

American musician (1904–1985)

James George Stamp (20 December 1904 – 22 December 1985) was an American professional musician.

== Early life ==
James George Stamp was born in Carberry, Manitoba, Canada, to James Walter Stamp and Frances Jane Stamp (nee Ireson), English immigrants who arrived in Canada in 1902. His parents were Salvationists. James Walter Stamp was musically inclined, playing cornet in the Army band and rising to the rank of major.

== Career ==
Stamp became a professional musician at age 16. He started in the Mayo Clinic Band in Rochester, Minnesota. After playing in Minneapolis theatres, he was asked to play 4th trumpet in the Minneapolis Symphony Orchestra. After an argument with the 1st trumpet, he was asked to play the 1st part on the Brahms 2nd Symphony while on tour in Cincinnati. He was given a contract as 1st trumpet for the next season immediately after the concert. Stamp stayed with the Minneapolis Symphony Orchestra for 17 years, playing trumpet under conductors such as Henri Verbrugghen, Eugene Ormandy and his favorite, Dimitri Mitropoulos.

After Eugene Ormandy left the orchestra and Dimitri Mitropoulos became conductor, the orchestra's finances were troubled. In 1944 he moved to California., where he was immediately asked to play in studio orchestras, as well as on radio and television programs. He suffered a heart attack in 1954, after which he devoted time to teaching. He wrote an instructional book, Warm-ups + Studies first published in 1978.

Thomas Stevens, former principal trumpeter of the Los Angeles Philharmonic Orchestra said,

I believe James Stamp was one of the finest teachers in the world. His approach was so flexible that I have never seen him fail to improve a player, whether it be an established symphony musician, jazz or lead player or a twelve-year-old student.

He died on December 22, 1985.

== Bibliography ==
- Warm-ups + Studies: trumpet & other brass instruments in treble clef, CD in C and Bflat (1995)

== Articles ==
Articles in the Brass Bulletin, International Magazine for Brass Players:

- Brass Bulletin 39, III-1982 (p. 14-21), Alfred Willener, Subtle Teaching
- Brass Bulletin 53, I-1986 (p. 3-4), Jean-Pierre Mathez/Thomas Stevens, Editorial "Homage to James Stamp"
- Brass Bulletin 100, IV-1997 (p. 59-65), Jean-Christophe Wiener, James Stamp, Master in Listening part 1
