= Eres Holz =

German composer

Eres Holz (born September 26, 1977 in Rehovot), is a German composer of Israeli origin. He has been living in Germany since 2003.

== Life Biography ==
Holz studied composition with Ruben Seroussi in Tel Aviv. From 2003 to 2011 he studied composition with Hanspeter Kyburz and electronic music with Wolfgang Heiniger at the Hochschule für Musik "Hanns Eisler" in Berlin, where since 2008 he has taught Algorithmic Composition with OpenMusic and Common Music.

His works have been performed in Germany, Switzerland, Israel, Spain and Australia, by Ensemble Adapter, Ensemble Zafraan, Modern Art Sextet, Trio Nexus, Ensemble Risonanze Erranti, Israel Contemporary Players, Ensemble Meitar and others, as well as broadcast on the national German public broadcaster Deutschlandradio and on Hessischer Rundfunk.

Since 2014 he has been a member of the Academy of German Composers (Akademie Deutscher Musikautoren)

== Grants & Awards ==
The Hanns Eisler Prize in Composition, in the category "Competition for Composition and Performance of Contemporary Music", 2005, 2008 and 2010.
Nominated in 2012 for the German Music Authors' Prize, in the category "Promotion of young composers".
In 2012 he received the half-year residency at the Cité internationale des arts for 2013 in Paris (a scholarship of the Senate of Berlin).
In 2013, 2014 and 2015 he was awarded composition scholarships from the Senate of Berlin.
2017 Composer-in-residence at the German national broadcasting radio station - Deutschlandfunk

== Music ==
Eres Holz draws inspiration from engagement with extra-musical disciplines such as psychology and film. His composition LATAH (2006/07) was inspired by research into the Malaysian mental disorder of that name. Weisse Wunden (2008) is based on text by the Belgian director Jan Fabre. Holz makes this extra-musical content collide with semi-strict, intra-musical organizing principles developed using algorithmic models. In addition, Holz uses electronic sounds, often referencing a musical archaicism, which he contrasts with highly expressive instrumental gestures.

== Press ==
The music of Eres Holz, a former student of Hanspeter Kyburz, is one of the most exciting discoveries that could be made in Ultraschall – Festival for Contemporary Music. Holz is looking for a harmonic binding beyond the major-minor tonality. The ensemble work of Kataklothes by Eres Holz exposes a chain of chords, a progress of which at the same time is peculiarly logical and open: the title of the piece refers to the Moirai in the ancient Greek mythology which spin the thread of life. The result is an immensely colorful and plastic music, which makes harmony experienceable as a constantly changing phenomenon, as something that is not static but mobile in itself.

— Julia Spinola, Deutschlandfunk, 24. January 2016

What is fascinating about the Israeli composer Eres Holz is the ability to arrange seemingly unlimited flowing, polyphonic organized material so that the music achieves a state of order and control that gives the composition its lucid sovereignty. The Music of Eres Holz has beauty and complexity side by side.

— Anton Schlatz, Opern- & Konzertkritik Berlin, 1. December 2019

The Quintett (2009) by Eres Holz presents itself as a solid, elaborate ensemble piece with complex voice movements that flow together in color and drift apart again. Significantly more extrovert: Kataklothes (2015), which expresses states of tumultuous chaos with shrill expressiveness and screaming, bright colors. A very intense piece with a lot of percussion, dissonant condensation and folk music valeurs, as if the goddesses of fate in ancient mythology would pull the strings here directly.

— Dirk Wieschollek, Neue Zeitschrift für Musik / Schott Music, 2017

[...] uncomfortable to encounter after this "somersault into the past" ('Ihr sollt die Wahrheit erben' by H. Keller) the ensemble piece Kataklothes by Eres Holz, an Israeli composer who has "returned" to Germany and whose ancestors include Polish Holocaust victims. "Connecting threads" according to the fate goddesses of Greek mythology are for Holz an essential source of inspiration for an overwhelmingly colorful, developing into organic flow introductory and releasing music.

— Isabel Herzfeld, Frankfurter Allgemeine Zeitung, 2019

From a standpoint of technical advancement Holz tries in compositions such as Quintett (2009) or in his recent work for ensemble Kataklothes (2015) to gain a tonal gravitation without tonality With Allen Ginsberg's great Kaddish poem, he chose a text that stands in a tensed relationship to religious tradition. The dubious, scrupulous search in the "labyrinth of identity," which Eres Holz refers to the text, may also drives his own work.

— Ingo Dorfmüller, Deutschlandfunk, 28. May 2016

== List of Works (selection) ==
- Brain of Love (2024) for large ensemble and live-electronics; commissioned by Ensemble New Babylon
- DEATH (2023) for light, two bass clarinets and live-electronics
- Three minds - twisted (2023) for string quartet; Commissioned by Tonedmelisma - International Festival for Contemporary Music
- „Ein Mensch erkennt, dass er nie Mensch war“ (2023) for large ensemble, video and live-electronics; Commissioned by Deutschlandfunk
- MACH (2022) for recorder and live-electronics
- MACH (2021) for harp and live-electronics
- Insight (2021) for ensemble and live-electronics
- MACH (2020) for cello and electronics
- MACH (2020) for saxophone and electronics
- MACH (2020) for trombone and electronics
- MACH (2020) for accordion and electronics
- die frau (2020) for mezzo-soprano, recorder and double bass (after a poem by Constantin Virgil Bănescu)
- Touching universes and ends (2019) for oboe/cor anglais, clarinet in si flat/bass clarinet, bassoon, piano, viola, cello, percussion and electronic; commissioned by Ensemble Aventure
- Gebt Frieden (2019) for mixed choir, trumpet, horn, trombone and piano
- Madrigal (2019) 2nd version for saxophone and accordion
- Colors of emptiness (2018) for flute, oboe/cor anglais, clarinet in b flat/basset horn and basson
- Dunkle Risse (2018) for string quartet; Commissioned by Deutschlandfunk
- Madrigal (2018) for shawm and accordion
- Amor (2018) from Lamento della Ninfa, SV 163 / Claudio Monteverdi, Arrangement for shawm and accordion
- Fernen (2018) for mixed choir (Paul Celan)
- for whom the bell tolls; it tolls for thee (2018) miniature for saxophone, piano, accordion, viola and horn
- hautwärts (2018) for saxophone, piano, accordion, cello and trombone
- Ostrakon (2017) miniatur for clarinet, accordion and string quartet
- MACH (2017) for pipe organ; Commissioned by Deutschlandfunk
- MACH (2017) for solo clarinet and Live electronics
- Schakalkopf (2016) for flute, clarinet, violin, viola and cello
- Kataklothes (2015) for large Ensemble; Commissioned by the Zafraan Ensemble, funded by the Ernst von Siemens Music Foundation
- Kaddisch nach Allen Ginsberg (2015) for Baritone singer, flute, oboe, trumpet, harp, electric guitar and percussion; Project "Mekomot-Orte": artistic director Sarah Nemtsov; Funded by the German Cultural Foundation, the Foundation "Remembrance, Responsibility and Future" and the German Music Council in cooperation with the Deutschlandfunk
- Chaconne (2014) for 6 instruments; commissioned by Meitar Ensemble
- Nemesis (2014) for 12 instruments; commissioned by the Berlin Cultural Administration (2014); collaboration with Ensemble Risonanze Erranti (Conductor: Peter Tilling)
- Study 1 in Markov-Chains (2014) coded in Common Music
- Vier Schatten (2013) for brass quintet; commissioned by the Berlin Cultural Administration (2013); collaboration with Ensemble Schwerpunkt
- MACH (2012/13) for piano solo (dedicated to the international pianist Einav Yarden)
- Sich einstellender Sinn (2011) for mezzo-soprano, keyboard and live-electronics (lyric: Asmus Trautsch)
- MACH (2011) for trumpet solo
- Erd und Abgrund muss verstummen (2010) for keyboard, cello and live-electronics
- Trällernde Erinnerung (2010) for flute, clarinet, viola, piano and percussion
- Quartett (2009) for flute, clarinet, viola and piano
- Quintett (2009) for flute, clarinet, viola, piano and harp
- Weiße Wunden (2008) music theatre for three trumpets and video
- BLACK BOX (2007) for flute, piano and percussion
- LATAH (2006–07) for 15 musicians and live-electronics
- Moiré (2006–07) for accordion and clarinet
- Transmigration (2006) for fixed media
- Perspektiven (2005) for eleven musicians
- Zirkulationen (2004) for piano solo
- Frauen von Freunden (2003) for tenor, piano, harpsichord and harp (text: Kurt Tucholsky)

== Discography ==
- Touching Universes (2022), NEOS Music GmbH, EAN: 4260063122071
- Klangrede (2016), bastille musique, ASIN: B01N8XERA5
- Denkklänge (2013), Klang und Musik bei Walter Benjamin, Wilhelm Fink Verlag, ISBN 3770553438
