= American Concerto =

The American Concerto is a trumpet concerto written by the American composer Ellen Taaffe Zwilich. The work was commissioned by the California Center for the Arts, Escondido, the San Diego Symphony, the Virginia Symphony Orchestra, the Buffalo Philharmonic Orchestra, and the trumpeter Doc Severinsen, to whom it is dedicated. The piece was completed in New York on June 12, 1994, and was given its world premiere by Doc Severinsen and the San Diego Symphony under the direction of JoAnn Falletta in Escondido, California, on September 24, 1994.

== Composition ==
The American Concerto cast in a single movement and has a performance duration of approximately 15 minutes. Zwilich titled the concerto thus, in part, "to pay tribute to the distinctive and virile style of American brass playing exemplified by Doc Severinsen." In the score program note, the composer elaborated, "Unlike his or her European counterparts, the American brass player typically has had a broad background encompassing orchestral, band and jazz idioms. This lends a special vitality and versatility to the playing and offers remarkable inspiration to a composer. My American Concerto celebrates this marriage of the visceral and exciting to the majestic and uplifting."

=== Instrumentation ===
The music is scored for a solo trumpet and a large orchestra consisting of piccolo, flute, oboe, English horn, two clarinets, bass clarinet, bassoon, contrabassoon, four horns, two trumpets, two trombones, bass trombone, tuba, timpani, two percussionists, and strings.

== Reception ==
The American Concerto has been generally praised by music critics. Reviewing the first performance by the Buffalo Philharmonic Orchestra, Herman Trotter of The Buffalo News wrote, "The music seldom stands still. Predominantly nervous and energetic, it dances around, always moving from one type of expression to another with very natural transitions. But despite this mercurial character of the lyric line, there is a strong feeling of organic unity holding all the elements together." Reviewing the first performance by the Virginia Symphony Orchestra, David Nicholson of the Daily Press similarly observed, "Instead of long melodic lines and sweeping orchestration, the concerto featured brilliant blasts from the trumpet over powerful, agitated undercurrents created by the orchestra." He continued, "The work possessed a tremendous amount of drama, with high-pitched sounds from the trumpet and pounding rhythms from the percussion section. Zwilich's use of different tempos created a relentless feeling that drove the work forward."

Anne Midgette of The New York Times was slightly more critical, however, remarking, "The trumpet concerto was an able piece that moved through its entire course sounding at every moment as if something were just about to happen, with a sense of building climaxes or impending adagios. But it never quite delivered on its promise, seeming finally to be a collection of gestures rather than a fully satisfying continuum."
