= Anthony Plog =

American conductor

Anthony Plog (born November 13, 1947) is an American conductor, composer and trumpet player.

== Life ==
Plog was born in Glendale, California, United States. He is a fellow of the Music Academy of the West where he attended in 1968. From 2006 to 2007, he held the Roy Acuff Chair of Excellence at Austin Peay State University.

== Works ==
=== Educational ===
- Etudes & Duets Book I for trumpet
- Method for Trumpet – Volumes 1–7

=== Chamber music ===
- 2 Scenes for trumpet, soprano voice and organ (1974)
- 3 Miniatures for horn and piano (1998)
- 3 Miniatures for flute and piano (2007)
- 3 Miniatures for trombone and piano (1994)
- 3 Miniatures for trumpet and piano (1994)
- 3 Miniatures for tuba and piano (1990)
- 3 Profiles for antiphonal euphonium – tuba ensemble (2006)
- 3 Sketches for oboe, horn in F and piano (1995)
- 3 Sonnets for horn, piano and narrator
- 4 Miniatures for viola and woodwind quintet (1983)
- 4 Sketches for brass quintet (1990)
- 4 Themes on Paintings of Edvard Munch for trumpet and organ (1986)
- 4 Themes on Paintings of Goya for trombone and piano (2001)
- Animal Ditties II for trumpet, narrator and piano (1983)
- Animal Ditties III for horn, piano and narrator
- Animal Ditties IV (new version 2001) for brass tentet and narrator (1988/rev. 2001)
- Animal Ditties VI for woodwind quintet and narrator (1993)
- Animal Ditties VII for brass quintet and narrator (1987)
- Animal Ditties VIII for guitar and narrator (1986)
- Concertino for trumpet, trombone and piano (1999)
- Concertino for trumpet, trombone and brass ensemble (1999)
- Concerto for flute and piano (1986)
- Concerto No 1 for solo trumpet, large brass ensemble and percussion (1988)
- Concerto No 2 for trumpet and piano (1994)
- Contemplations for flugelhorn and piano (2007)
- Dialogue for horn, tuba and piano (1992)
- Dialogue for 2 tubas (2009)
- Double Concerto for Two Trumpets for 2 trumpets and piano reduction (2001)
- Fanfare M.T. for 9 trumpets (1995)
- Hurry Up for 4 trumpets (1993)
- Jocaan Trio for flute (+picc.), trumpet (+picc. Bb + flugelhorn) and organ (2010)
- Mini-Variations on Amazing Grace for brass ensemble (1990)
- Mosaics for brass quintet (1997)
- Nocturne for horn and piano (1987)
- Nocturne for trombone and piano
- Nocturne for trumpet and piano (1994)
- Nocturne for trumpet and organ (1994)
- Nocturne for tuba and piano (2004)
- Postcards for trumpet solo (1994)
- Postcards II for horn solo (1995)
- Postcards III for trombone solo (1999–2002)
- Postcards IV for bass trombone solo (2010)
- Postcards V for tuba solo (2019)
- Scherzo for brass ensemble and percussion (1994)
- Short Meditation for 12 euphoniums or trombones (2010)
- Short Meditation for 12 violoncelli (2010)
- Sonata for trumpet and piano (2009)
- Statements for tuba (contrabass trombone) and piano (1994)
- Suite for 6 trumpets (1980)
- Summit Fanfare for brass ensemble (2004)
- Trio for brass for trumpet, horn and trombone (1996)
- Triple Concerto for trumpet, horn, trombone and piano (1995)
- Trombone Quartet No 1 “Densities” for trombone quartet (1998/2000)
- Tuba Concerto for tuba and piano reduction (1997)
- Tuba Sonata for tuba and piano (2007)

=== Solo and wind ensemble ===
- 3 Miniatures for trombone and wind ensemble (1994)
- 3 Miniatures for trumpet and wind ensemble (1996)
- 3 Miniatures for tuba and wind ensemble (1990)
- Concerto for flute and wind ensemble (1986)
- Concerto 2010 for brass quintet and wind ensemble (2010)
- Concerto No 1 for solo trumpet, wind ensemble and percussion (1988/2007)
- Contemplations for flugelhorn and wind ensemble (2007)
- Double Concerto for Two Trumpets for 2 solo trumpets and wind ensemble (2001)
- Triple Concerto for trumpet, horn, trombone and wind band (1995/2009)

=== Solo and orchestra ===
- Concerto No 2 for trumpet and orchestra (1994)
- Double Concerto for Two Trumpets for 2 trumpets and chamber orchestra (2001)
- Nocturne for horn and string orchestra (1987)
- Nocturne for trombone and string orchestra (1996)
- Nocturne for trumpet and string orchestra (1994)
- Nocturne for tuba and string orchestra (2004)
- Triple Concerto for trumpet, horn, trombone and symphony orchestra (1995)
- Tuba Concerto for tuba and symphony orchestra (1997)

=== Orchestral ===
- Animal Ditties V for orchestra and narrator (1992)
- Fuocoso for symphony orchestra (2008)
- Landscapes for symphony orchestra (1992)
- Scherzo for Symphony orchestra (2006)
- Symphony No 1 for antiphonal strings, 14 brass and percussion (1992/93)
- Weiter for symphony orchestra (2007)

=== Wind band / ensemble ===
- Evolutions for wind band (1999)
- Mini-Variations on Amazing Grace for wind ensemble (1990)
- Textures for wind ensemble (2010)
