= Constantin Virgil Bănescu =

Romanian poet

Constantin Virgil Bănescu (Romanian pronunciation: [konstanˈtin virˈd͡ʒil bəˈnesku]; born May 26, 1982, in Târgoviște, Romania – died August 12, 2009) was a notable Romanian poet of the 2000 generation, also known for his translation activity.

== Poetry ==
- câinele, femeia și ocheada (t: the dog, the woman and the glance) (Timpul, Iaşi, 2000);
- floarea cu o singură petală (t: the flower with a single petal) (Junimea, Iaşi, 2002);
- același cer ce nu e (t: the same sky that is not) (Vinea, București, 2006);

(translations of his poetry available in German, Spanish, Slovenian and Hungarian).

== Prizes ==
- Prize of the Bucharest Young Writer's association
- Hubert Burda Prize for Young Poets from the South and South-East Europe (2003)
