= Dispelling the Fears =

Concerto by Mark-Anthony Turnage

- Double concerto by Mark-Anthony Turnage
- Composed: Original version: 1993 – 1994: Arsenal; Revised version: October 1995 – November 1995: Arsenal
- Performed: October 29, 1995 - Bedford
- Published: 1996 - London
- Duration: 20 minutes
- Movements: 1
- Scoring: Two trumpets; Orchestra

Dispelling the Fears is a double concerto for two trumpets and orchestra by the British composer Mark-Anthony Turnage. It was composed in 1993 and 1994.

== Background ==
This double concerto was initially inspired by a homonymous painting by Heather Betts. It was commissioned by the Philharmonia Orchestra and the Eastern Orchestral Board, with financial assistance from the Arts Council of England. The concerto was dedicated to Heather Betts and Brett Dean and was composed in 1993 and 1994 in Arsenal. However, the piece was revised again around the date of its first performance, in October and November 1995. Its first performance took place on October 29, 1995, at The Corn Exchange, in Bedford. Håkan Hardenberger and John Wallace played the trumpet parts, with the Philharmonia Orchestra conducted by Daniel Harding. The revised version was published in 1996 by Schott.

Dispelling the Fears was also used by Turnage as the last section of the nine-movement, large-scale composition Blood on the Floor. The arrangement used for Blood on the Floor is an abridged, scaled-down version of the concerto, with several full sections removed from the original version and a total duration of around 15 minutes.

== Structure ==
The concerto has a total duration of twenty minutes with no movement indications. It is scored for two solo trumpets in C, two flutes, two alto flutes, two oboes, two cor anglais, two clarinets in B-flat, two bass clarinets, two bassoons, two contrabassoons, two soprano saxophones, two horns in F, two trombones, a euphonium, a tuba, a large percussion player for only two percussionists (featuring a large bass drum, a tabla, a large suspended cymbal, a large tam-tam, four low gongs, Japanese temple bells, a vibraphone, a glockenspiel, crotales, tubular bells, bell plates, two bongos, a djembe, and a large lion's roar), a harp, a piano, a celesta, and a string section, consisting of eight first violins, eight second violins, six violas, six cellos, and four double basses.

Despite it being a double concerto, according to musicologist Nigel Simeone, Turnage uses "sombre and sinister colours" and the solo parts seem conceived "for a single instrument with two distinctive personalities". Upon this, Turnage also stated that he was "interested in the physical quality of the music: not just the sound, but the effect it has. There is a visceral quality in the music I like... There is something you can really grab hold of, something almost physical that you can touch."

== Recordings ==
Despite having generally been met with enthusiasm by critics, this composition has not been performed or recorded very frequently. The authoritative version was recorded by the musicians who premiered it on February 4, 1996, at Henry Wood Hall, London, being released later that year by Decca. The abridged version used for Blood on the Floor has also been recorded once by trumpet players William Forman and Bruce Nockles, with the Ensemble Modern conducted by Peter Rundel. That recording was released in 1997 by Decca and Argo.
