= Thomas Stevens (trumpeter) =

American musician

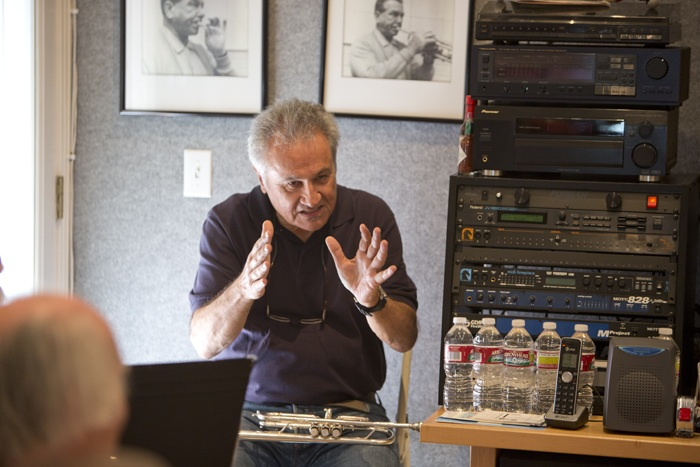
Thomas Stevens lecturing at Camp McNab 2012

Thomas Stevens (July 29, 1938 – July 14, 2018) was an American trumpeter, composer, and author.

Thomas Stevens was appointed to the Los Angeles Philharmonic Orchestra in 1965 by then music director, Zubin Mehta, who named him principal trumpet in 1972, a position he held until 2000. He served in the same capacity with the "World Orchestra for Peace," Sir Georg Solti's hand-picked group assembled in Geneva for the celebration of the fiftieth anniversary of the United Nations, and the Casals Festival Orchestra in Puerto Rico.

The Los Angeles appointment was preceded by a stint in the U.S. Army as solo trumpeter with the West Point Band followed by a one-year engagement with the Dallas Symphony Orchestra.

In addition to his work as an orchestral musician, Mr. Stevens performed and recorded as a soloist and chamber musician with major organizations worldwide, including the Chamber Music Society of Lincoln Center, and during the early 1980s he was invited by Pierre Boulez to participate in a special new brass music project with the Ensemble intercontemporain in Paris. He was a founding member of the Los Angeles Brass Quintet and also maintained an active presence in the Hollywood recording studios for many years.

Stevens is perhaps best known for his activities in the promotion, performance, and premiere recordings of new music for solo trumpet. His efforts have resulted in many works which have become staples of the genre, including the "Sequenza X" of Luciano Berio, which was written specifically for him.

Stevens was a composer, arranger, and orchestrator whose works have been performed in major concert venues and on recordings. His original educational materials are used in music schools throughout the world. He was the editor of the published definitive version of the internationally acclaimed James Stamp Warm-Ups and Studies (Editions Bim) and also edited the James Stamp Supplemental Studies (2009) for the same publisher. In 2011, Stevens compiled and edited the Editions Bim publication, After Schlossberg, a collection of derivative post-Schlossberg era trumpet studies, and in 2016, Gossamer Wings Music released the educational video, Thomas Stevens on Musicianship: Vacchiano's Rules and Beyond, which features selected excerpts from Stevens's masterclasses at the Center for Advanced Musical Studies at Chosen Vale (New Hampshire). In 2017, the hour-long video, Thomas Stevens, The Schlossberg Workshop at Chosen Vale was posted on YouTube.

Thomas Stevens's primary trumpet studies were with Lester Remsen and James Stamp in Los Angeles, and William Vacchiano in New York City. As a teacher in his own right, Stevens has been a regular faculty member at the University of Southern California, CalArts, and the Music Academy of the West, and he has given master-classes and held residencies at leading institutions around the globe. The list of those who have studied with him includes prominent international soloists, members of major symphony orchestras, and faculty members at leading universities and schools of music. Mr. Stevens was a member of the founding board of directors of the International Trumpet Guild.

Following his retirement from the Los Angeles Philharmonic in December, 1999, Thomas Stevens has continued his activities on the international master class circuit, teaching in various U.S. and European venues, including repeat appointments to the faculties of the Lake Placid Institute, the Center for Advanced Musical Studies at Chosen Vale, TAW Bremen, Germany, and during the fall term of 2008, the California Institute of the Arts.

In 1996, Thomas Stevens was named outstanding alumnus of the year by the University of Southern California (Thornton) School of Music, where he did his undergraduate studies, and in 2007 he received a Certificate of Special Recognition from the Congress of the United States, together with a similar citation from the California State Senate, for "outstanding and invaluable service to the community."

== Career ==
=== World premiere concerts ===
- Henri Lazarof, Spectrum (w/Utah Symphony Orchestra, Salt Lake City, 1974)
- Luciano Berio, Sequenza X (w/Los Angeles Philharmonic New Music Group, 1984)

=== World premiere recordings ===
- Frank Campo Times (1971)
- Iain Hamilton Five Scenes (1971)
- Robert Henderson Variation Movements (1971)
- William Kraft Encounters III (1971)
- Aurelio De La Vega Para-Tangents (1973)
- Henri Lazarof Spectrum (1974)
- Chou Wen-Chung Soliloquy of a Bhiksuni (1975)
- Verne Reynolds Signals (1978)
- Hans Werner Henze Sonatina (1981)

=== Compilations ===
- Thomas Stevens Trumpet Crystal Records CD 665
- Thomas Stevens Trumpet Crystal Records CD 667
- Thomas Stevens Trumpet Crystal Records CD 761
- Philharmonic Standard Time Crystal Records CD 960
- French Chamber Music (St. Saens Septet w/André Previn) RCA Red Seal 09026-68181-2
- Classic American Songbook (w/André Previn) DRG CD 5222 (1992) reissued mp3 Gossamer Wings Music (2008)

=== Solos recorded with orchestra ===
- Concertos in Contrast (Haydn Trumpet Concerto) Decca Eloquence 466 683 2
- Henri Lazarof Spectrum for Trumpet and Tape (w/Utah Symphony Orchestra) CRI CD 588
- Masters of the Trumpet (Bach Brandenburg #2) Deutsche Grammophon B0005042-02
- Music of Alan Hovhaness (Prayer of St, Gregory) Crystal Records 801
- Alan Hovhaness (Avak the Healer) Crystal Records 806
- Shostakovich Piano Concerto #1 (w/Bronfman/Salonen/LAP) Sony Classical SK60677

=== Published compositions ===
- The Moudon Fanfares (Wimbledon Music (Century City, California 1979)
- Variations on Clifford Intervals (Editions BIM 1983)
- A New Carnival of Venice (1985) Alphons Leduc, Paris 1985, copyright reassigned Editions BIM, Switzerland (2008)
- Variations in Olden Style (Editions BIM 1989)
- Triangles I (Editions BIM 1992)
- Triangles II "Segnali" (Editions BIM 1988 revised/published 2010)
- Triangles III "Encore Doc" (Editions BIM 1992)
- Triangles IV (Editions BIM 1994)
- Igor's Dance (Editions BIM 2001)
- Eight Studies for Eight Trumpets (Editions BIM 1999)
- Four Little Pieces (Editions BIM 2005)
- Aria con Variazoni (Editions BIM 2006)

=== Recorded compositions and arrangements ===
- The Moudon Fanfares: Dallas Trumpets (Crystal Records CD 230)
- A New Carnival of Venice: Thomas Stevens with Los Angeles Philharmonic Trumpet Section (Crystal Records CD 665)
- Triangles I: Thomas Stevens (Crystal Records CD 665)
- Variations in Olden Style (w/keyboard accompaniment): Roger Bobo Tuba Libera (Crystal Records CD690)
- Variations in Olden Style (w/orchestra accompaniment): Oystein Baadsvik (Bis Records 2003)
- Variations in Olden Style (w/keyboard accompaniment): Stepane Labeyrie (Octavia Records 2007)
- My Funny Valentine: Håkan Hardenberger with The Academy of St. Martin in the Fields Chamber Orchestra (Bis SACD 1814)

=== Educational publications ===
Original Materials:

- Contemporary Trumpet Studies (Billaudot, Paris 1975)
- Changing Meter Studies (Editions BIM 1980)
- Contemporary Interval Studies (Editions BIM 1981)

As editor/compiler:

- 48 Lyrical Studies (Editions BIM 1997)
- James Stamp Warm Ups and Studies (Editions BIM 4th Edition 2005)
- James Stamp Supplemental Studies (Editions BIM 2008)
- After Schlossberg (Editions BIM 2011)

== Other significant musical affiliations ==
- Los Angeles Brass Quintet (1966–73)
- Festival Casals of Puerto Rico (1975)
- Chamber Music Society of Lincoln Center (1994)
- Orchestra for World Peace (Solti) (1995)
- Center for Advanced Musical Studies, Chosen Vale (2005–2016)

=== Awards ===
In 1996, Stevens received the "Alumnus of the Year" award from the University of Southern California (Thornton) School of Music, where he had done his undergraduate studies, and in 2007 he received a Certificate of Special Recognition from the United States Congress in recognition of outstanding and invaluable service to the community.
