= William Presser =

William Henry Presser (19 April 1916, Saginaw, Michigan – 20 August 2004, Lafayette, Louisiana) was an American composer, violinist, and publisher of American chamber music particularly for brass and woodwinds. Both as a composer and a publisher, he pioneered repertoire for unfamiliar instruments and combinations, such as duets for oboe with trombone, and concert recital works for instruments such as baritone saxophone and alto clarinet. He earned degrees in violin and theory from Alma College, University of Michigan, and the Eastman School of Music. His teachers included Roy Harris, Gardner Read, Bernard Rogers, Burrill Phillips, and Pierre Monteux.

Presser performed both as violinist and violist in the San Francisco Symphony and Rochester Philharmonic, and he taught at six colleges. In addition to a long association with the Interlochen summer camp, he taught composition at University of Southern Mississippi in Hattiesburg from 1953 through 1981.

Over 130 works by Presser are in the catalogs of twenty publishers. His chamber works for winds and brass are staples of the repertoire, appearing on many contest lists and college recitals.

Presser founded Tritone Press & Tenuto Publications in 1961, and over 41 years built a catalog of over 350 works by over 50 American composers.
