= Valentin Zubiaurre =

Spanish composer (1837–1914)

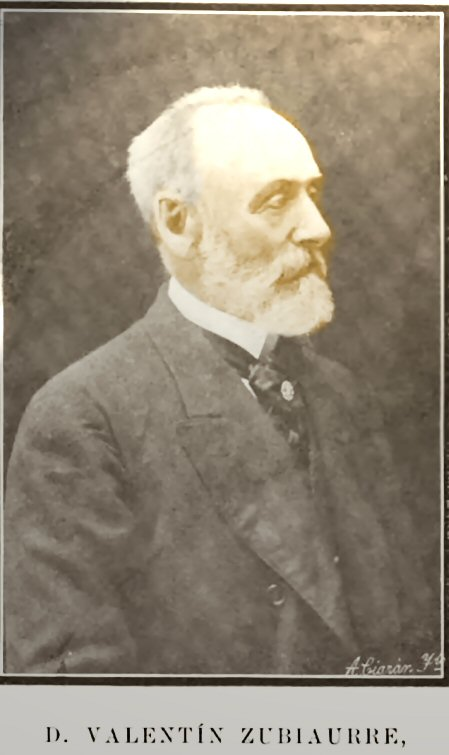

Valentin Zubiaurre Urionabarrenechea (13 February 1837 – 13 January 1914) was a Spanish composer who was a professor at the Madrid Royal Conservatory and worked at the Chapel Royal.

== Life ==
Zubiaurre was born in Garay, a Basque town in the province of Biscay on 13 February 1837. His first musical experience was as a choirboy in Bilbao, and he later went on to study the organ. He traveled to Latin America in 1852, where he taught music until 1866, when he returned to Spain. This proved to be fruitful, as in 1869 he won the National Music Competition for an opera called Ferdinand Set.

He was noticed by authorities and received a scholarship from the Academy of Fine Arts, with which he visited France, Germany and Italy to study. Upon his return he entered the Chapel Royal, which he eventually became master of in 1878. At the chapel he composed religious music and audition pieces for applicants. In this year he also became a professor at the Madrid Conservatory, where he composed the Audition Piece for Trumpet, one of his only compositions still used for the purpose of examination.

== Known works ==
=== Solo pieces ===
- Audition Piece for Trumpet
- Fantasy for horn with piano accompaniment
- Oboe solo with piano accompaniment

=== Operas ===
- Luis de Camoes
- Ferdinand Set
- Leda

=== Orchestral ===
- Symphony in E minor (1870)

=== Religious music ===
- St. Matthew Passion
- 5 Masses
- Requiem
- Salve
- Stabat Mater
- Motets

=== Piano ===
- 2 Sonatas
