= Larry Bitensky =

American composer

Larry Bitensky (born 1966 in New York, New York) is an American composer, singer-songwriter, and educator, who has written for a variety of genres, including piano, chamber ensembles, orchestra, and wind ensemble.

== Biography ==
Bitensky earned a DMA in composition at Cornell University and an MM in composition at Ithaca College. His primary composition teachers include Steven Stucky, Dana Wilson, Roberto Sierra, and Karel Husa. He also studied piano with Stephen Drury at the New England Conservatory of Music where he earned a B.M. in piano performance.

Bitensky's music has been described as "extraordinary sensitive and beautiful" and "speaking directly from the heart" and his works have been performed throughout North America and Europe. Some of his works have also been performed by the United States Marine Band.

In 1998, Bitensky began a 27-year career teaching at Centre College in Danville, Kentucky, where he taught music theory, composition, aural skills, world music, and a popular course on the Grateful Dead. At Centre he was named the Charles T. Hazelrigg Associate Professor of Music and then later held the title of W. George Matton Professor of Music until his retirement in 2025.

Bitensky was married to Katherine Nelsen from 1992 until her death in 2016.

== Works ==
From 1998 to 2015, Bitensky was a classical composer for a variety of ensembles. In 2015, he turned his eye toward improvisational performance, releasing the album The Nature of Three with Daniel Worley on guitar and Nathan Link on bass as the Trace Trio. Bitensky subsequently played keyboards in the Next Stop Jazz Band, the Kentucky jam band Fourth Street Station, and the Grateful Sunday Band. In 2022, Bitensky released his first album of original songs, In from the Cold.

=== Chamber works ===
- What Winter Dreamt
- From those Beginning Notes of Yearning
- Fanfare
- The Other Side
- Awake, You Sleepers!
- One for Two
- Then the Letting Go

=== Wind ensemble works ===
- We Tread and Go
- The Closing of the Gates
- Hadra
- Awake, You Sleepers!
- One for All
- To Touch the Sky

=== Piano ===
- From the Corner Room
- The Alchemy of Solitude
- Scent of the World We Gave Up
- Rapture
- Vocalise
- Shouts and Murmurs, Books 1 & 2
- One for Two

=== Orchestra ===
- Awake, you Sleepers!
- Einstein's Dreams
- LIGHTRIDE
- To Touch the Sky

=== Vocal ===
- Mishb'rey Yam
- Vayashav Hamal'ach
- The Drift of Things
- Doctor Knickerbocker and Other Stories
