= Concerto for Two Trumpets (Vivaldi) =

Concerto by Antonio Vivaldi

- Concerto by Antonio Vivaldi
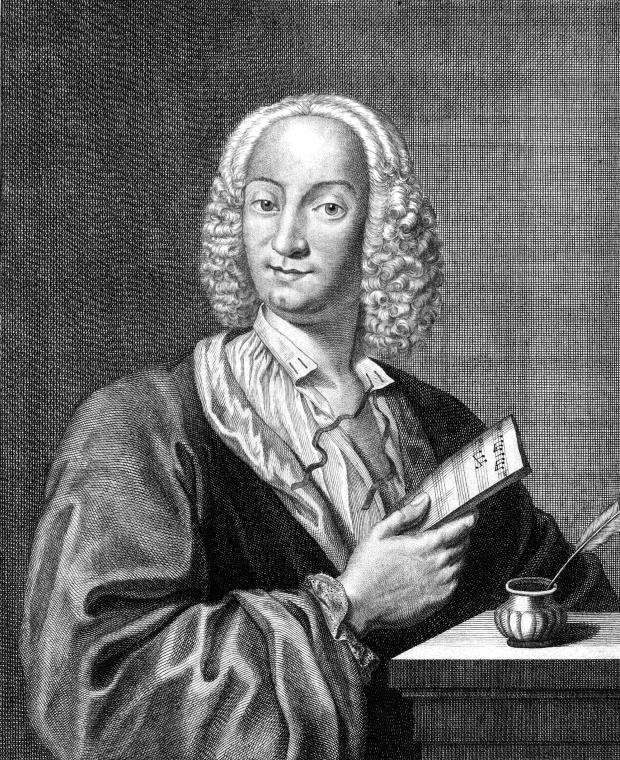
- Engraving of Vivaldi by La Cave, 1725
- Key: C major
- Catalogue: RV 537
- Composed: 1720s
- Published: 1950
- Movements: 3
- Scoring: 2 trumpets; strings; continuo

Antonio Vivaldi's Concerto for Two Trumpets in C major, RV 537, is a concerto for two trumpets, string orchestra and basso continuo in three movements, believed to have been composed in the 1720s. It is Vivaldi's only trumpet concerto. It was published by Ricordi in 1950 after its manuscript was found in a Turin library.

== History ==
Vivaldi composed the Concerto for Two Trumpets in C major possibly in the 1720s in Venice. It is his only trumpet concerto; it is not known for whom he wrote it. It seems unlikely that he wrote it for the Ospedale della Pietà, because the ensemble there comprised voices, strings and keyboard. It was written for the natural trumpet of the time; as a valveless instrument this was limited to the notes of the natural harmonic series which means that its music tends to stay close to its home key.

A manuscript was found in the Renzo Giordano Collection at the Turin National University Library, which holds much of Vivaldi's personal collection. It was first published, edited by Gian Francesco Malipiero, by Casa Ricordi in 1950. Vivaldi also used the second movement for his Concerto for strings in C major, RV 110. The third movement is similar to the first movement of RV 110.

== Music ==
The concerto is structured in three movements:

1. Allegro
2. Largo
3. Allegro

The outer movements display the virtuosity of the soloists in passage-work and fanfares. The two trumpets usually play together in the solo passages, but at times also play with the strings in the tutti parts.

In the first movement, the strings modulate to a minor key, which returns to the major when the trumpets re-enter. In the middle movement of only six measures, the trumpets are silent, with both the style and harmony being unsuitable for the instrument. It is in a languid mood, set with sustained chords from the strings. The third movement, beginning with fanfare arpeggios in canon from the soloists, is in a triple metre and brings the work to a vigorous conclusion.
