= Trumpet Concerto (Grime) =

2022 trumpet concerto by Helen Grime

Trumpet Concerto, night-sky-blue, is a concerto for trumpet and orchestra written in 2022 by the Scottish composer Helen Grime. The work was commissioned by the Koussevitzky Foundation, Library of Congress, the London Symphony Orchestra, and the Boston Symphony Orchestra. Its world premiere was given by the trumpeter Håkan Hardenberger and the London Symphony Orchestra conducted by François-Xavier Roth at the Barbican Centre, London, on 3 April 2022.

== Composition ==
The concerto is written in one continuous movement composed of interlinking sections and has a duration of roughly 22 minutes. The subtitle, "night-sky-blue, is taken from a poem by Fiona Benson.

=== Instrumentation ===
The concerto is scored for a solo trumpet and an orchestra comprising three flutes (2nd doubling alto flute; 3rd doubling piccolo), two oboes, Cor anglais, three clarinets (2nd doubling alto clarinet; 3rd doubling E-flat clarinet), two bassoons, contrabassoon, four horns, two additional trumpets, two trombones, bass trombone, tuba, timpani, four percussionists, piano (doubling celesta), harp, and strings.

== Reception ==
Reviewing the world premiere, the music critic Richard Fairman of the Financial Times gave the concerto modest praise, writing, "Its salient feature is how taut the construction is, charging its energy from a small number of ideas, led by a motif of oscillating minor thirds." Andrew Clements of The Guardian was more critical, however, describing it as "disappointingly limited in its solo writing, which seemed to fixate on just a couple of ideas." He continued, "The orchestral writing was far more imaginative and the ear was often drawn away from the solo trumpet to what was going on elsewhere – not exactly ideal in a concerto."

American music critics were more receptive of the concerto, however. Jeremy Eichler of The Boston Globe described it as "a compelling and evocative work, one that plays artfully with the trumpet's wide range of sonorities as grasped through the shifting scrim of orchestral sound. The music, which was in the composer's words 'inspired by the idea of a garden at night,' feels consistently fresh and inventive, the solo line in a state of perpetual transformation and, at its most compelling moments, seemingly expanded from within by bright washes of percussion." Steven Ledbetter of The Boston Musical Intelligencer similarly wrote, "The role of the solo trumpet is both challenging and varied."
