= Audition Piece for Trumpet (Zubiaurre) =

The Pieza De Cornetin con Accompanamiento De Piano para oposiciónes (Audition Piece for Cornet/Trumpet with Piano Accompaniment) is a short piece by the Spanish composer Valentin Zubiaurre written for either trumpet or cornet. In this article it will be mentioned as a trumpet piece, as this is what it is mostly performed on.

== Background ==
From 1878 Valentin Zubiaurre worked at the Madrid Royal Conservatory as a composer of audition pieces for potential members of the school. He had experience in this form of composition from his duties at the Chapel Royal, where he composed audition pieces for most instruments, as well as religious music. The Pieza De Cornetin para oposiciónes is his piece for the trumpet, and was probably used as a setpiece for final examinations in the conservatoire.

== Description ==
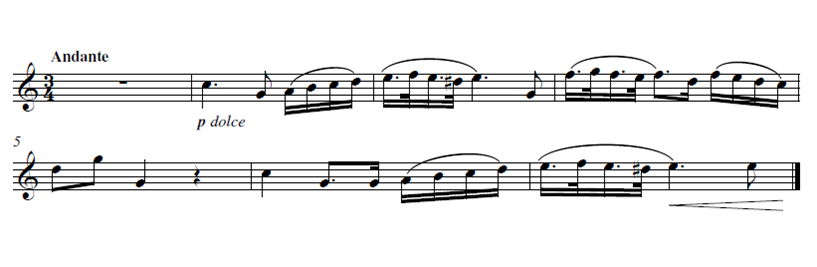
The beginning of the piece's andante movement

The piece is divided into two movements, marked andante and allegretto respectively. The piano accompaniment (and the piece itself) is written in B♭ major, but the trumpet part is transposed into C major (the trumpet is a B♭ key instrument). Only the trumpet part will be discussed here. The andante is written in 3/4 time, and was written to bring out some of the smooth and tranquil sounds of the trumpet. For examination purposes it was designed to show off the performer's ability to play a slow melody with a good sound and sensitive phrasing. The andante finishes with a diminuendo-ing long pause, and then moves into the 6/8 allegretto. This section demands a flamboyant and ostentatious playing style with quick tonguing. It is written for the more exuberant side of the trumpet's personality. The piece as a whole is written in a light Spanish style, very much like Bizet's opera Carmen.

== Other uses ==
In the United Kingdom the piece is used as part of the ABRSM Grade 7 syllabus for trumpet.

== See also ==
- Carmen
