= Kol-Od =

- by Luciano Berio
- Related: Sequenza X
- Performed: 2 April 1996
- Scoring: trumpet; chamber ensemble

Kol-Od (also titled Chemins VI) is a composition for solo trumpet and chamber ensemble by Luciano Berio. The ensemble consists of 3 flutes, oboe, 4 clarinets, 2 saxophones, bassoon, 2 horns, 2 trumpets, trombone, tuba, celeste, accordion and strings.

One of a series of works entitled Chemins that are largely based on the composer's Sequenzas, Kol-Od incorporates the solo trumpet part from Sequenza X.

Kol-Od was premiered by Gabriele Cassone with the Ensemble InterContemporain, Pierre Boulez conducting, on April 27, 1996, in Basel, Switzerland.
