= Håkan Hardenberger =

Swedish trumpeter (born 1961)

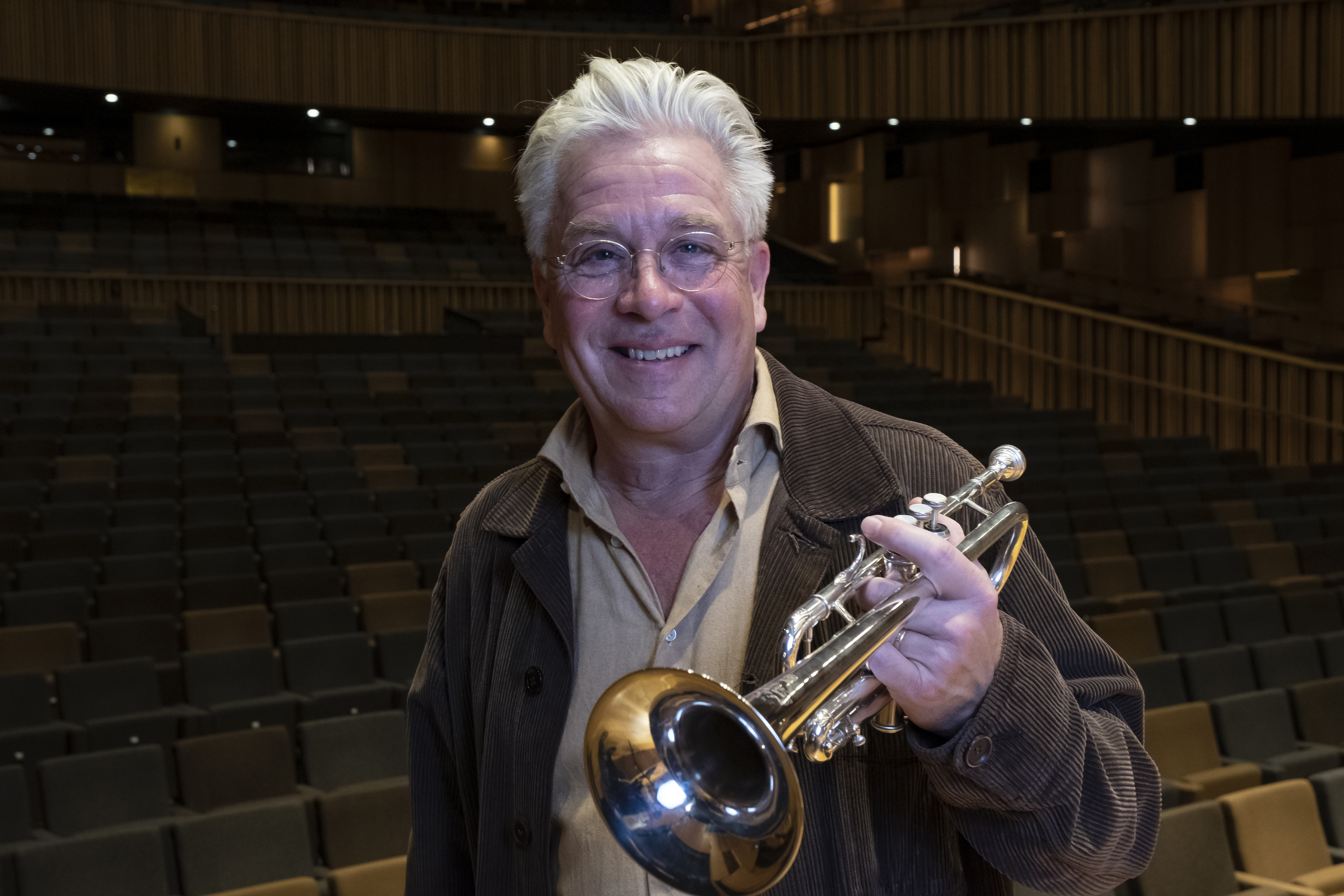
Hardenberger in 2021, News Øresund, Malmö, Sweden

Ulf Håkan Hardenberger (born 27 October 1961) is a Swedish trumpeter, conductor, and professor at the Malmö Academy of Music.

== Early life ==
Hardenberg was born in Malmö and began his practice of the trumpet at the age of eight under the guidance of his hometown teacher, Bo Nilsson. He then pursued further studies at the Paris Conservatoire, with Pierre Thibaud, and in Los Angeles with Thomas Stevens.

== Career ==
Hardenberger is a pioneer of important virtuosic new trumpet works. He collaborated with contemporary composers Harrison Birtwistle, Brett Dean (Dramatis Personae), HK Gruber (Aerial), Hans Werner Henze, Betsy Jolas, György Ligeti and Mark-Anthony Turnage (Dispelling the Fears). In 2021, he premiered Jörg Widmann's Towards Paradise. In 2022, he first performed Helen Grime's Trumpet Concerto, night-sky-blue, and in 2023, he premiered Wynton Marsalis's Trumpet Concerto for Europe.

Hardenberger performed with New York Philharmonic, Boston Symphony, Wiener Philharmoniker, Swedish Radio Symphony Orchestra, London Symphony Orchestra, Symphonieorchester des Bayerischen Rundfunks, NHK Symphony Orchestra and conductors Alan Gilbert, Daniel Harding, Paavo Järvi, Ingo Metzmacher, Andris Nelsons, John Storgårds and David Zinman. From 2016 to 2018, he was the artistic director of the Malmö Chamber Music Festival. In the 2019/20 season, he conducted Leipzig Gewandhaus Orchestra, Seoul Philharmonic Orchestra, Malmö Symphony Orchestra, Swedish Chamber Orchestra, and Tasmanian Symphony Orchestra. Hardenberger has been called "the cleanest, subtlest trumpeter on earth" by The Times.

== Awards ==
- 1999 Member No. 927 Kungliga Musikaliska Akademien
- 2003 Litteris et Artibus
- 2020 Kungliga Musikaliska akademiens Interpretpris

== Discography ==
=== Albums ===
- 2019: Stories – Trumpet Concertos
- 2018: The Scene Of The Crime
- 2017: Hakan Hardenberger Plays Dean & Francesconi
- 2013: Turnage: Speranza, From the Wreckage by Hakan Hardenberger
- 2012: Both Sides, Now
- 2011: Haydn/Hummel/Richter: Virtuoso Trumpet Concertos
- 2007: The Art of the Trumpet
- 2006: 20/21 Gruber 'Aerial', Eötvös 'Jet Stream', Turnage 'From the Wreckage', Gothenburg Symphony Orchester, Peter Eötvös (Grammophone 2894776150)
- 2006: Exposed Throat Gruber, Börtz, Ruders, Henderson, Holloway (BIS 1281)
- 2002: British Music Collection: Orchestral Works Peter Maxwell Davies, BBC Philharmonic Orchestra, Elgar Howarth (Decca 4734302)
- 2002: Adventures – Mysteries of the Macabre Gyorgy Ligeti, Roland Pöntinen (Deutsche Grammophon 4716082)
- 2002: Concertos Martinsson, Pärt, Tanberg, Gothenburg Symphony Orchestra, Neeme Järvi (BIS 1208)
- 2001: British Music Collection: Dispelling the Fears Mark-Anthony Turnage, Philharmonia, Wallace, Harding (Decca 4688142)
- 2001: Prières san Parole Constant, Tomasi, Jolivet, Sauguet, Jansen, Satie, Damase, Hakim, Simon Preston (BIS 1109)
- 2001: British Music Collection: Endless Parade Harrison Birtwistle, BBC Philharmonic, Elgar Howarth (Decca 4734302)
- 2000: Wind Concertos Joseph Haydn, Academy of St Martin in the Fields, Sir Neville Marriner, Elgar Howarth (Decca Eloquence 4681802)
- 2000: Panorama – Virtuoso Trumpet Clarke, Albinoni, M. Haydn, JS Bach, Stamitz, Hummel, I Musici, Sir Neville Marriner, Hans Stadlmair, Simon Preston (DG 4692292)
- 2000: Famous Classical Trumpet Concertos (2 CDs) Haydn, Hertel, Hummel, Stamitz…, The Academy of St Martin in the Fields, The London Philharmonic, Sir Neville Marriner, Elgar Howarth, Simon Preston, I Musici (Philips 464028-2)
- 2000: Håkan Hardenberger plays Swedish Trumpet Concertos Börtz, Sandström, Rabe, Malmö Symphony Orchestra, Gilbert Varga (BIS 1021)
- 1999: Concertos for Piano and Trumpet Shostakovitch, Enesco, City of Birmingham Symphony Orchestra, Paavo Järvi, Leif Ove Andsnes (EMI 5567602)
- 1999: Fireworks – Music composed by Elgar Howarth: Vol 3 Elgar Howarth, Eikanger-Bjørsvik Musikklag, Elgar Howarth (Doyen Records)
- 1997: Brass Concertos Holmboe, Aalborg Symphony Orchestra, Arwel Hughes, Christian Lindberg, Jens Bjørn-Larsen (BIS 802)
- 1996: Emotion Henze, Takemitsu, Berio, Kagel, Tisné, Blake Watkins, Henze, Ligeti (Philips 446 065-2)
- 1995: Cycle-Concert Skalkottas, H.Holliger / B.Canino / K. Thunemann (Philips 442 795-2/Universal Music 470-486-2)
- 1994: Baroque Trumpet Concerti Albinoni, Vivaldi, Corelli, Torelli, Marcello, Viviani, Franceschini, Baldassare, I Musici di Roma (Philips 442 131-2)
- 1994: The Virtuoso Trumpet J-B Arban, Jean Françaix, Antoine Tisné, Arthur Honegger, Sir Peter Maxwell Davies, Folke Rabe, John Hartmann, Roland Pöntinen (BIS 287)
- 1994: Requiem Henze, Ensemble Modern, Ingo Metzmacher, Ueli Wiget (Sony SK 58972)
- 1992: Trumpet and Organ Spectacular Martini, Clarke, Albinoni, Bach, Læillet, Gounod, Telemann, Simon Preston (Philips 434-074-2)
- 1990: Trumpet Concertos Telemann, Academy of St Martin in the Fields Iona Brown, Michael Laird, William Houghton (Philips 420954)
- 1990: Concertos Hummel, Hertel, Stamitz, Haydn, J., Academy of St Martin in the Fields, Sir Neville Marriner (Philips 420-203-2)
- 1989: Kantaten Bach, JS, Carl Philipp Emanuel Bach Chamber Orchestra, Barbara Hendrichs, Peter Schreier (EMI 7498452)
- 1989: At the Beach Höhne, Dinicu, Thomson, Mendelssohn, Waldtenfel, Bernstein, Glazunov, Ibert, Weide, Reger, Bitsch, Pöutine, Roland Pöntinen (Philips 422-344-2/Polygram Classics)
- 1988: Requiem for Fallen Soldiers Tubin, Lund Studentsångare, Gothenburg Symphony Orchestra, Neeme Järvi (BIS – CD297)
- 1986: Trumpet Concertos Haydn, Hummel, Hertel, Stamitz, First Recording, Academy of St. Martin-in-the-Fields, Sir Neville Marriner (Philips 420 203-2)
