= Trumpet Concerto (Musgrave) =

2019 composition by Thea Musgrave

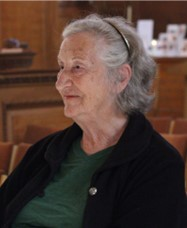
Thea Musgrave in 2017

Thea Musgrave's Trumpet Concerto was written in 2019 for the trumpeter Alison Balsom (to whom it is dedicated) on a commission from the Cheltenham Music Festival, the City of Birmingham Symphony Orchestra, and the Los Angeles Philharmonic. Its world premiere was given by Balsom and the City of Birmingham Symphony Orchestra conducted by Edward Gardner at the Cheltenham Music Festival on 6 July 2019. The piece later won the 2020 South Bank Sky Arts Award for Classical Music.

== Composition ==
=== Background ===
Musgrave's inspiration for the concerto came from two main sources. The first was during her first meeting with Balsom, who mentioned that she loved to "sing" with her instrument. In the score program note, Musgrave wrote, "This idea of using the trumpet as a 'singing' instrument immediately captured my imagination."

The second source of inspiration came when the composer attended an exhibition called "A Certain Light" featuring still life paintings of trees by the artist Victoria Crowe, whom Musgrave had previously met when Crowe painted her portrait. The composer wrote

I was immediately grabbed by the image of the very first painting I looked at—Opening Out—with the energy of the tree reaching from the roots upwards and outwards. I felt it could be a metaphor for the journey of life: reaching out to find colleagues, friends, lovers, but also ideas and projects – all those things that make life meaningful and fulfilling. I thought that this painting along with several others that I saw could form an overall shape to the work as well as the right environment for the trumpet's singing.

Crowe agreed to support the work with her artwork; each movement is thus named for one or more of the artist's paintings. The fourth movement also features the traditional Scottish ballad "The Bonnie Earl O' Moray" in a nod to Musgrave's Scottish heritage.

=== Structure ===
The concerto lasts about 20 minutes and is cast in five short, mostly connected movements:

1. Opening Out
2. How the Snow Fell
3. Between Two Windows
4. White Nights of a Northern Summer
5. Landscape with Hidden Moon (including a final coda: Sonorous Tree)

=== Instrumentation ===
The work is scored for solo trumpet and an orchestra consisting of two flutes (2nd doubling piccolo), two oboes (2nd doubling Cor anglais), two clarinets (2nd doubling bass clarinet), two bassoons, two horns, an additional trumpet (offstage then onstage), harp, three percussionists, and strings.

== Reception ==
Critical reception to the concerto has been generally positive. Richard Bratby of The Arts Desk wrote, "Throughout this short, dramatic, often skittish work you felt that same sense of an artist in complete control of her material, and saying what she has to say precisely as she means to say it." Mark Swed of the Los Angeles Times similarly called the concerto "a delight," adding, "Musgrave's orchestral writing is robust. Her melodies don't go where you expect them to but sound like they're meant to be the way they are."

Rian Evans of The Guardian was more critical of the piece, however, described it as "relatively anodyne."
