= Trumpet Concerto (Mozart) =

Lost composition by W. A. Mozart

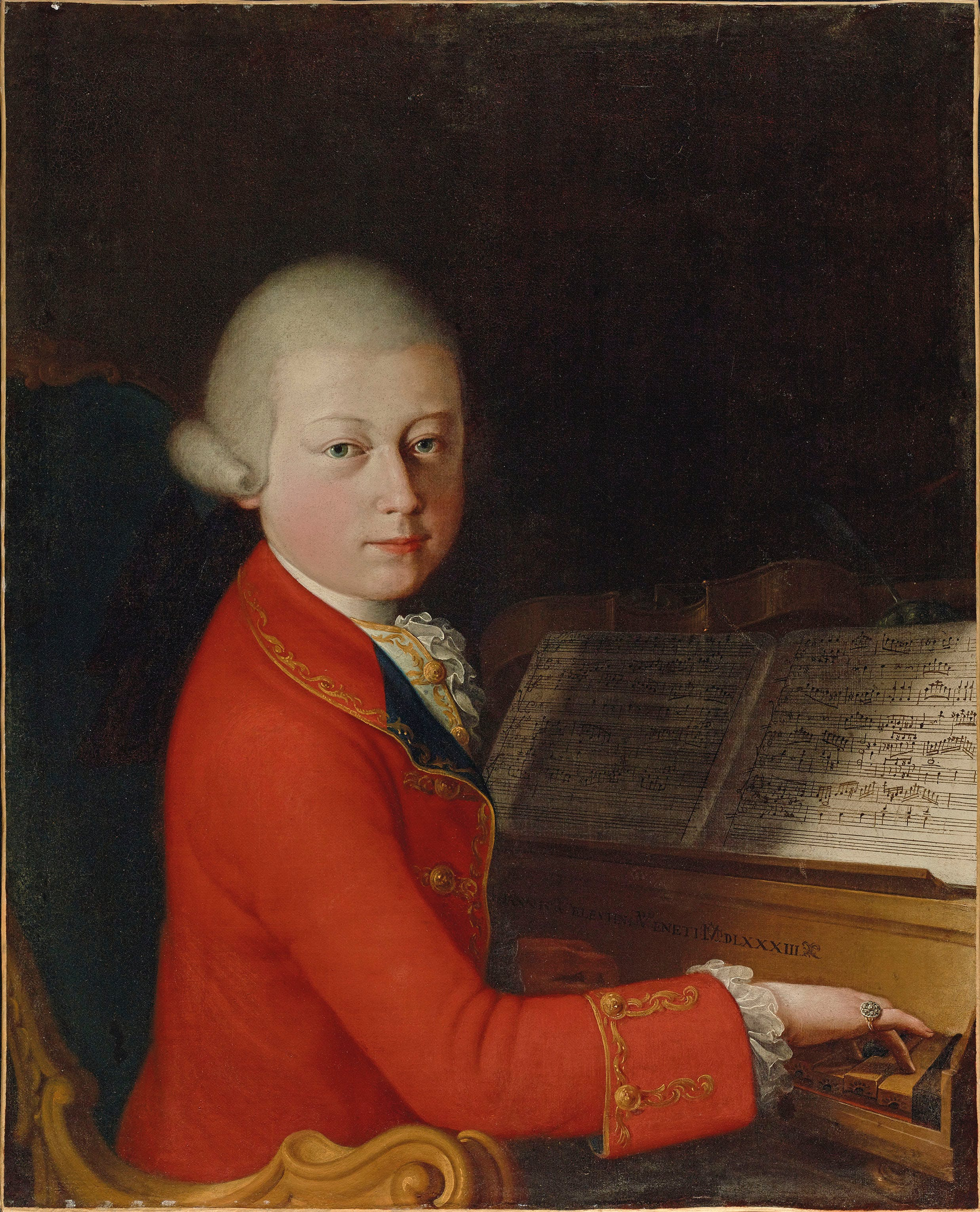
1770 Verona portrait of Mozart

The Trumpet Concerto, K. 47c, is a putative concerto for trumpet by Wolfgang Amadeus Mozart, that is now lost (if it ever existed). It would be Mozart's only concerto written for a brass instrument other than his four horn concertos.

== History and evidence for existence ==
The only evidence for the existence of the concerto is a letter written on 12 November 1768 by Mozart's father, Leopold, in Vienna to Lorenz Hagenauer back in Salzburg, the Mozarts' home. In the letter, Leopold wrote that "the new church of Father Parhammer's orphanage will be consecrated on the Feast of the Immaculate Conception. For this feast, Wolfgang has composed a solemn mass, an offertorium and a trumpet concerto for a boy...". The church involved was the church Mariä Geburt on the Rennweg in the Vienna district of Landstraße, and the intended soloist may have been an orphan, Ignatz Schmatz. The consecration is known to have happened, as the Wienerisches Diarium reported on the service on 10 December 1768. However, as the trumpet concerto does not appear on Leopold's list of his son's works, it is uncertain whether it ever actually existed. The other compositions performed at the service are thought to be the Mass in C minor, K. 139 "Waisenhaus", and a lost offertory (previously thought to be the extant Benedictus sit deus, K. 117).

== Loss ==
If the concerto was indeed written, no copy is known to survive. The surviving manuscripts from the Kirche Mariä Geburt, now in the Seminary of Vienna, show no trace of the work. Karl Pfannhauser informed the American musicologist H. C. Robbins Landon that the concerto was performed again after its premiere in the church. According to Landon, the orphanage's papers were often moved, and it is likely that during one of these moves, they were lost.
