= List of musicology topics =

This is a list of musicology topics. Musicology is the scholarly study of music. A person who studies music is a musicologist. The word is used in narrow, intermediate and broad senses. In the narrow sense, musicology is confined to the music history of Western culture. In the intermediate sense, it includes all relevant cultures and a range of musical forms, styles, genres and traditions, but tends to be confined to the humanities - a combination of historical musicology, ethnomusicology, and the humanities of systematic musicology (philosophy, theoretical sociology, aesthetics). In the broad sense, it includes all musically relevant disciplines (both humanities and sciences) and all manifestations of music in all cultures, so it also includes all of systematic musicology (including psychology, biology, and computing).

== Musicology topics ==
=== A ===
- American Musicological Society
- Atonality
- Aesthetics of music
- Aristoxenus
- Arnold Schoenberg
- Ars antiqua
- Ars nova
- Ars subtilior

=== B ===
- Bibliography of Music Literature
- Bisector (music)
- Byzantine chant
- Bach Gesellschaft
- Basso continuo
- Bel canto
- Biblioteca Marciana
- British Library Sound Archive

=== C ===
- Campanology
- Chant
- Chinese musicology
- CHOMBEC
- Cognitive musicology
- Cognitive neuroscience of music
- Computational musicology
- Claudio Monteverdi
- Counterpoint
- Cantus firmus
- Conductus

=== D ===
- Diatonic set theory
- Dickinson classification
- Documentation Centre for Music
- Denis Diderot
- Dorian mode
- Development (music)

=== E ===
- Ecomusicology
- Embodied music cognition
- Ethnomusicology
- Evolutionary musicology
- Equal temperament
- Enharmonic
- Exposition (music)
- Early music

=== F ===
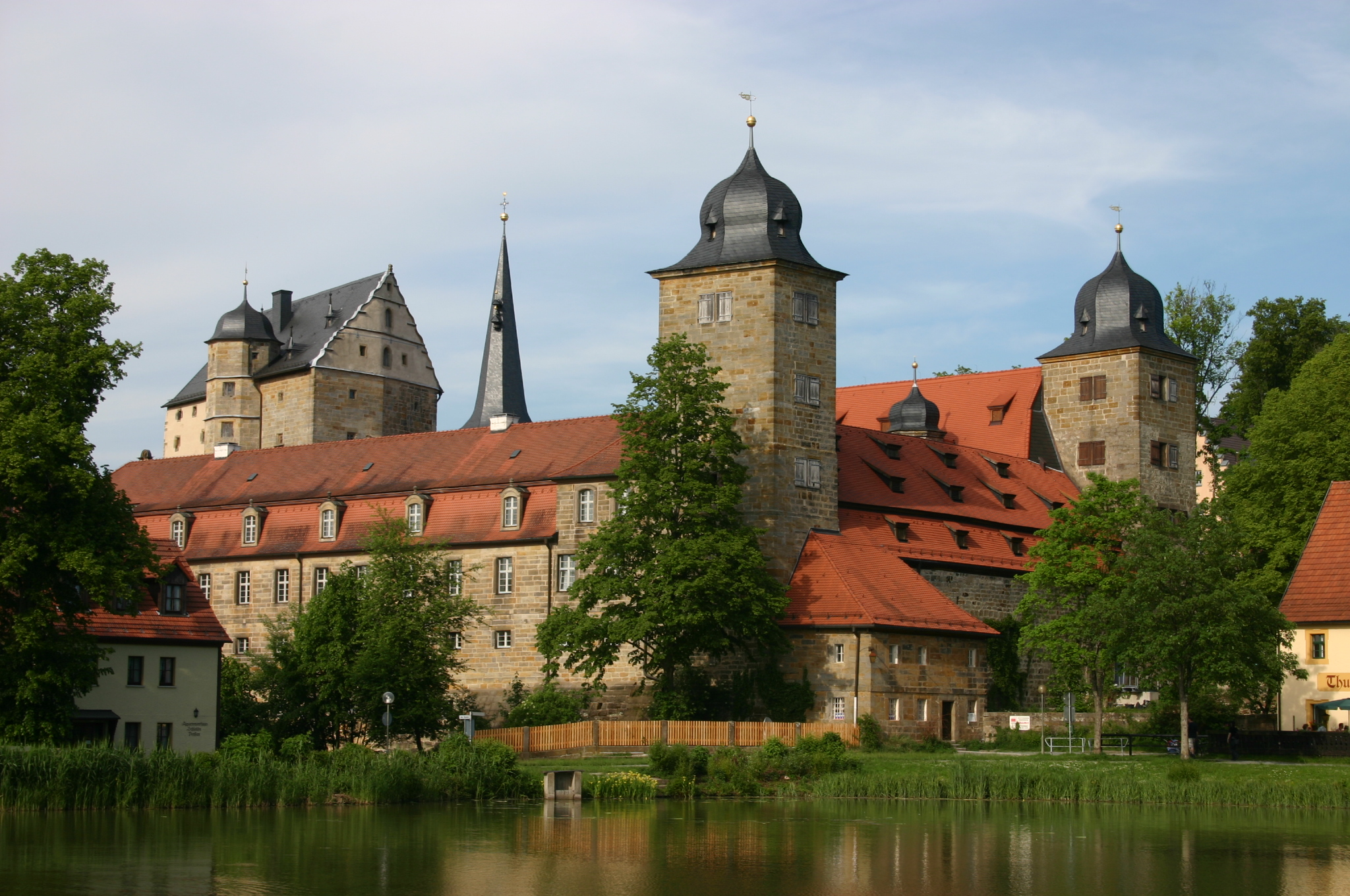
Thurnau Castle, the location of Forschungsinstitut für Musiktheater

- Fanfare (magazine)
- Forschungsinstitut für Musiktheater

=== G ===
- Gebrauchsmusik
- Galant Schemata

=== H ===
- Harshness
- History of classical music traditions
- Berthold Hoeckner

=== I ===
- Institute for History of Musical Reception and Interpretation
- International Research Center for Traditional Polyphony

=== K ===
- Liudmila Kovnatskaya

=== L ===
- Ludomusicology

=== M ===
- Melody type
- Mensural notation
- Music and politics
- Music history
- Music psychology
- The Music Trades (magazine)
- Musica poetica
- Musical gesture

=== N ===
- New musicology

=== O ===
- Opus (classical record magazine)
- Organology

=== P ===
- Psychoanalysis and music

=== R ===
- Rastrum
- Répertoire International des Sources Musicales
- Royal Musical Association
- Russian Orthodox bell ringing

=== S ===
- Schizophonia
- Single affect principle
- Sociomusicology
- Sonus (journal)
- Sound culture
- Spectromorphology
- State Institute for Music Research
- Systematic musicology

=== T ===
- Tanabe Hisao Prize
- The Musical Leader
- Timbral listening
- Tonkunst
- Treatise on Instrumentation
- Tune-family

=== V ===
- Vijayanagara musicological nonet
- Virtual Library of Musicology

=== W ===
- White power music
- Women in Music

=== Z ===
- Znamenny chant
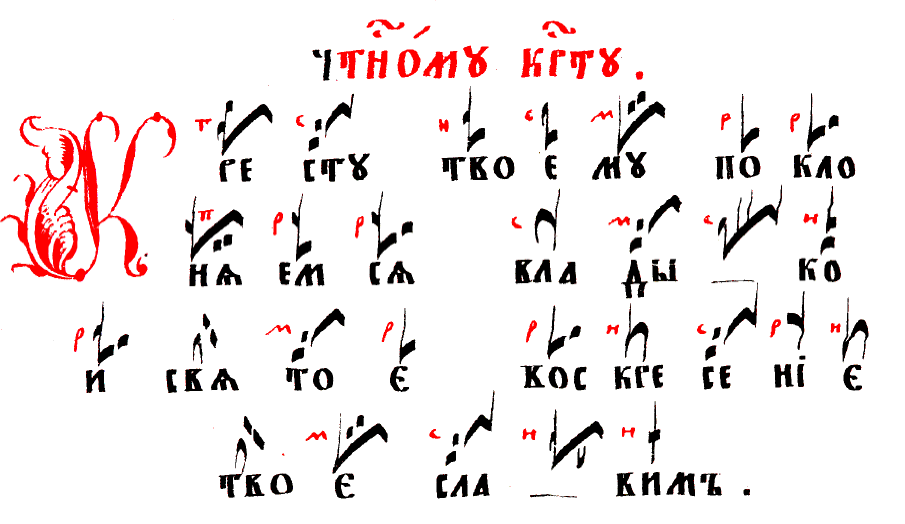
An example of Znamenny notation with so-called "red marks", Russia, 1884. "Thy Cross we honour, oh Lord, and Thy holy Resurrection we praise."
