= Anthony Baines =

English organologist

Anthony Cuthbert Baines (6 October 1912 – 2 February 1997) was an English bassoon player and organologist who produced a wide variety of works on the history of musical instruments, and was a founding member of the Galpin Society.

== Career ==
Baines was born on 6 October 1912 in London. His older brother was the instrumentalist and composer Francis Baines. He attended Westminster School and then read for a degree in natural sciences, specialising in chemistry, at Christ Church, Oxford (1933). He won a scholarship to the Royal College of Music to study the bassoon (1933–35).

He performed with the London Philharmonic Orchestra (1935–48), interrupted by service during the Second World War. In 1949 he became assistant conductor to the LPO and in 1950 associate conductor at the International Ballet Company. In 1955–65 he taught music in schools (Uppingham School and Dean Close), and began to be active in musicological research, studying musical instruments. In 1970–80 he worked in the University of Oxford's music faculty, lecturing and developing the faculty's Bate Collection of Musical Instruments. He retired in 1982.

Baines wrote works on wind instruments and other musical instruments, some of which are described by Philip Bate in his entry in Grove Music Online as "standard texts". He was a founding member of the Galpin Society, and twice edited the society's journal (1956–63 and 1970–84).

He was an elected fellow of the British Academy (1980), received the Curt Sachs Award of the American Musical Instrument Society (1985) and was awarded honorary degrees by Oxford (1977) and the University of Edinburgh (1994).

== Personal life ==
He married Patricia Stammers in 1960. Baines died on 2 February 1997 in Farnham, Surrey.

== Selected publications ==
- Woodwind Instruments and their History (London: Faber & Faber, 1957; reprinted 1962, 1967, 1991)
- Bagpipes (Oxford: Oxford University Press, 1960; reprinted 1979, 1995), ISBN 0-902793-10-1
- Musical Instruments Through the Ages (Harmondsworth: Pelican, 1961; revised edition, London: Faber, 1966), ISBN 0-14-020347-8
- European and American Musical Instruments (London: B. T. Batsford, 1966; London: Chancellor, 1983)
- Brass Instruments: Their History and Development (London: Faber, 1976; reprinted New York: Dover, 1993)
- The Bate Collection of Historical Wind Instruments (Oxford University, Faculty of Music, 1976), ISBN 0907486282
- The Oxford Companion to Musical Instruments (Oxford: Oxford University Press, 1992), ISBN 0193113341

== Bibliography ==
- Jeremy Montagu: "Anthony Baines, 1912–97", in Early Music vol. 25 (1997), May, pp. 345–346.
- Joan Rimmer: "Anthony Cuthbert Baines, 1912–1997: A Biographical Memoir", in: The Galpin Society Journal vol. 52 (1999), April, pp. 11–26.
- https://www.thebritishacademy.ac.uk/documents/373/115p053.pdf
