= Abblasen =

Trumpet fanfare attributed to Gottfried Reiche

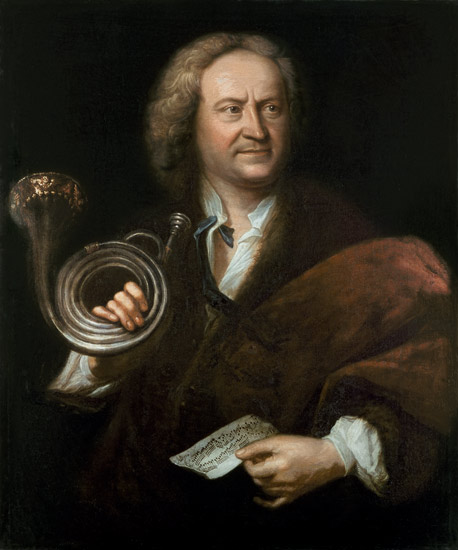
Portrait, oil on canvas of Gottfried Reiche (1667–1734) by Elias Gottlob Haussmann (1695–1774)

Abblasen is a trumpet fanfare attributed to Gottfried Reiche. In Elias Gottlob Haussmann's famous portrait of Reiche, he is seen holding a scrap of paper with two lines of melody written on it. Abblasen is a reconstruction of what appears to be on the manuscript in Haussmann's painting. There is no way of knowing if Reiche wrote the melody that appears in the painting, or indeed, to confirm that the version of Abblasen that is played today is an accurate transcription of the manuscript.

The piece is usually performed in the key of D, and it spans two octaves of the trumpet's range. A vinyl recording of a version by Don Smithers, played on an eight-foot baroque trumpet, was used as the theme song to the long-running CBS News Sunday Morning for almost 20 years until CBS opted to switch out the vinyl recording with a clearer digital recording performed by Doc Severinsen on a piccolo trumpet. Severinsen's version, which was noticeably not in the Baroque style, was later replaced by a recording by Wynton Marsalis. In 2021, CBS made "Abblasen" the theme for CBS Mornings, a retooling of the CBS This Morning show airing weekdays and Saturday (as CBS Saturday Morning), to connect it with the popular Sunday Morning show. Furthermore, it was used alongside CBS' five note jingle by Antfood.

Reiche composed 122 pieces entitled Abblasen-Stücken, but the fanfare on the Haussmann portrait, if it is Reiche's, is the only one that survives.
