= CBS News Sunday Morning =

American newsmagazine television program

- Also known as: Sunday Morning; CBS Sunday Morning
- Genre: News magazine
- Created by: Robert Northshield; E.S. "Bud" Lamoreaux III
- Directed by: Ken Sable; William M. Brady; Nora Gerard
- Presented by: Charles Kuralt (1979–1994); Charles Osgood (1994–2016); Jane Pauley (2016–present)
- Theme music composer: Gottfried Reiche; Don Smithers; Doc Severinsen; Wynton Marsalis
- Opening theme: "Abblasen" by Wynton Marsalis
- Country of origin: United States
- Original language: English
- No. of seasons: 48

Production
- Executive producers: Robert Northshield; Linda Mason; Missie Rennie; Rand Morrison
- Camera setup: Multi-camera
- Running time: 90 minutes (with commercials)
- Production company: CBS News

Original release
- Network: CBS
- Release: January 28, 1979 – present

Related
- CBS Mornings; CBS Saturday Morning; CBS News Mornings

CBS News Sunday Morning (frequently shortened to Sunday Morning or CBS Sunday Morning) is an American television newsmagazine that has aired on CBS since January 28, 1979. Created by Robert Northshield and E.S. "Bud" Lamoreaux III, and originally hosted by Charles Kuralt, the 90-minute program airs Sundays between 9:00 a.m. to 10:30 a.m. EST, and between 6:00 a.m. to 7:30 a.m. PST. Since October 9, 2016, the program has been hosted by Jane Pauley, who also hosts news segments. Her predecessor, Charles Osgood, hosted Sunday Morning for twenty-two years (and is the program's longest-serving host) after taking over from Kuralt on April 10, 1994.

== History ==
=== Charles Kuralt era (1979–1994) ===
On January 28, 1979, CBS launched Sunday Morning with Charles Kuralt as host. It was originally conceived to be a broadcast version of a Sunday newspaper magazine supplement, most typified by The New York Times Magazine. When the network introduced its new six-day-a-week morning show format on January 22, 1979, CBS News' weekday morning broadcasts were similarly branded as Monday Morning through Friday Morning respectively, and were produced on the same set. However, these broadcasts emphasized hard news as opposed to Sunday Morning's focus on feature stories. CBS News Sunday Morning was the first weekend morning network news program on American television; (Note: Today and Good Morning America would eventually launch their own Sunday editions, respectively, in 1987 and 1993. CBS News had produced In the News for its Saturday-morning cartoon lineup from 1971 to 1986, though it was produced as a two-minute interstitial "micro-series" intended for children and pre-teens.) at the time of its debut, the major broadcast networks usually aired public affairs, religious and children's programs on Sunday mornings (many of which were preempted by their affiliates for local and syndicated programming). The newsmagazine took over the 90-minute slot previously occupied by three long-running series: religious programs Lamp Unto My Feet and Look Up and Live, and arts anthology series Camera Three.

Originally anchored by Bob Schieffer, Kuralt eventually took over the daily role, and was for a short time joined by Diane Sawyer as co-host. However, the weekday program's then-limited 7:00 a.m. to 8:00 a.m. EST air time (the long-running series Captain Kangaroo was entrenched in the 8:00 a.m. hour) hampered its ability to compete with Today on NBC and Good Morning America on ABC, though it expanded to ninety minutes (from 7:30 a.m. to 9:00 a.m. EST) in 1981 and was renamed simply Morning.

In 1982, the weekday version was extended to two hours (7:00 a.m. to 9:00 a.m.) and reverted to its previous title as the CBS Morning News, adopting a different set and distinct graphics in the process; by March, Kuralt had been replaced by Bill Kurtis. Meanwhile, Kuralt continued hosting Sunday Morning until April 3, 1994, when he retired after fifteen years and was succeeded by Charles Osgood.

In April 1986, Sunday Morning departed from its usual format to carry a special, two-hour episode focusing on Russian pianist Vladimir Horowitz; the first half-hour consisted of a feature story following Horowitz's preparations for his first recital in the Soviet Union since 1925, and was followed by a live 90-minute telecast of the performance from the Bolshoi Theatre. Kuralt stated that it was only the third time in the history of Sunday Morning that an entire episode had been devoted to a single subject. The special was broadcast with limited commercial interruption, with sponsorship from AT&T.

Although the attempt to apply the same format to weekday broadcasts proved unsuccessful, the Sunday broadcast survived and retains its original format, including elements of its original graphic and set design. Long after the daily editions ended, Sunday Morning's opening sequence continued to display all seven days of the week until the early 2000s.

=== Charles Osgood era (1994–2016) ===
Wordmark Logo used from 1999 to 2004

Osgood's first broadcast as host was on April 10, 1994. Ultimately, his tenure of twenty-two years as host exceeded Kuralt's fifteen. Osgood's final broadcast as host was on September 25, 2016.

Among Osgood's personal trademarks were his bow-tie, his weekly signoff ("Until then, I'll see you on the radio") and his propensity for delivering his commentaries in whimsical verse. For example, when the United States Census Bureau invented a designation for cohabitant(s) as "Person(s) of Opposite Sex Sharing Living Quarters", or "POSSLQ", Osgood turned it into a pronounceable three-syllable word and composed a prospective love poem that included these lines, which he later used as the title of one of his books:

"There's nothing that I wouldn't do
If you would be my POSSLQ."

On January 25, 2004, Sunday Morning celebrated its 25th anniversary with clips and highlights from the show's first quarter-century on the air. On February 1, 2009, the program celebrated its 30th anniversary, and segments examined how the world had changed in the three decades its debut, the history of Sundays in the U.S. and–as a tie-in to the show's logo–the physics of the sun. An artist was commissioned to create new sun logos for the program, which debuted on that edition and were used in future broadcasts. On May 17, 2009, Sunday Morning began broadcasting in high-definition. In 2014, rebroadcasts of the program began airing on sister cable network Smithsonian Channel (owned by CBS's parent company ViacomCBS) but has since been pulled from that channel's programming.

=== Jane Pauley era (2016–present) ===
In 2014, Jane Pauley, a former co-host of NBC's Today, appeared as an interview subject on Sunday Morning; positive audience response to this segment led to Pauley being hired as a contributor to the show later that year. Pauley was elevated to the role of the program's host in 2016, succeeding Osgood, once again making her the anchor of a regular morning news program for the first time in over twenty-five years and becoming her first job as the host of any television program since 2005; she continues in this role as of 2026. Pauley began her role as host on October 9, 2016, nearly forty years to the day since her debut on Today.

== Format ==
Each edition follows a story totem pole in the center of the CBS soundstage, with previews of featured stories set to air during the broadcast (the first four of which feature clips from the story packages with preview narration by the respective correspondent) during the introduction. Each story covered in a given episode has a glass plate with its headline on this pole (digitally inserted on the pole as a prepared graphic since the late 2000s), which the camera follows after the host's introductions. Music in the show is usually limited to the opening and closing title theme. The host introduces each story with a short monologue, then sends the show out to the taped segment. The show usually ends with a preview of next week's Sunday Morning broadcast. After the commercial break, there is a thirty-second tranquil nature scene.

For most of its history, the program was typically presented live, with a short summary of national and international news headlines, sports, and a national weather forecast right after the featured story teasers, and a preview of the guests and topics to air on that week's Face the Nation (which follows the program on most CBS stations) near the end of the program. During the occasional weeks that Sunday Morning aired a pre-taped theme broadcast, the headlines segment would instead be presented live by another anchor. By early 2022, observers noted that Sunday Morning had quietly shifted to a pre-taped format; in the event of a major weekend news story, it may be presented with a generic on-set introduction combined with an off-set voiceover by the host.

Notably, Sunday Morning includes significant coverage of the fine and performing arts, including coverage of topics usually not covered in network news, such as architecture, painting, ballet, opera and classical music, though increasingly more popular forms of music have been included as well. The program's correspondents tend to ask nontraditional questions of guests (for instance, actor Brad Pitt was asked about his love of architecture, and Grant Hill about his painting collection). Television essays also appear, and the program generally has a stable of equally positive and negative news stories to fill up the program when there is no breaking news of note. Story lengths are longer (lasting up to twelve minutes at a time) and the pace of the program is considerably quieter and more relaxed than CBS Mornings and CBS Saturday Morning, even after those programs began sharing some of Sunday Morning's branding elements.

Commentators Ben Stein and Nancy Giles appear in recurring segments to deliver opinion commentaries, and correspondent Bill Geist also contributes human interest stories. The program ends with a nature scene, not given a formal title for most of the program's history, but since entitled "Moment of Nature" as it is now a sponsored element.

Despite the stereotype of the program appealing primarily to senior citizens, Sunday Morning has actually placed first in its time slot in the key demographic of adults 25–54, beating all of the political discussion-driven Sunday morning talk shows.

=== Segments ===
- Cover Story: The main topic of that week's broadcast
- Almanac: A notable event or the birth or death of a person that happened on the same calendar day of the weekly broadcast
- Profile: A look at the accomplishments of people
- Pulse: A look at facts by different sources
- Passage: A person who died within the past week
- Calendar: A look at the week ahead
- The Moment of Nature: A look at animals and plants at the conclusion of the weekly broadcast

== Production ==
The program is marked by its distinctive Sun of May-style logo, which is prominent in the program's title sequence. In addition, between some segments images of the sun in other forms appear. The show's theme is the trumpet fanfare "Abblasen", attributed to Gottfried Reiche. A recording of the piece on a baroque trumpet by Don Smithers was used as the show's theme for many years until producers decided to replace the vinyl recording with a digital of a piccolo trumpet by Doc Severinsen. The extant version is played by Wynton Marsalis.

Sunday Morning and CBS' other morning news programs have remained fully separate productions, though with occasional cross-promotion and some sharing of correspondents. On August 31, 2021, the network announced that its weekday morning show would be relaunched as CBS Mornings and its Saturday counterpart as CBS Saturday Morning. Under the latest versions, both programs have taken on some elements of Sunday Morning like its logo and "Abblasen" fanfare, although with a more contemporary feel and aspects of CBS's new corporate branding. Its second hour also features a larger focus on long-form stories not unlike Sunday Morning.

On May 21, 2023, Sunday Morning received an updated logo and refreshed graphics package to align itself with other CBS News programs, while preserving most of the program's existing look and feel.

== On-air staff ==
=== Host ===
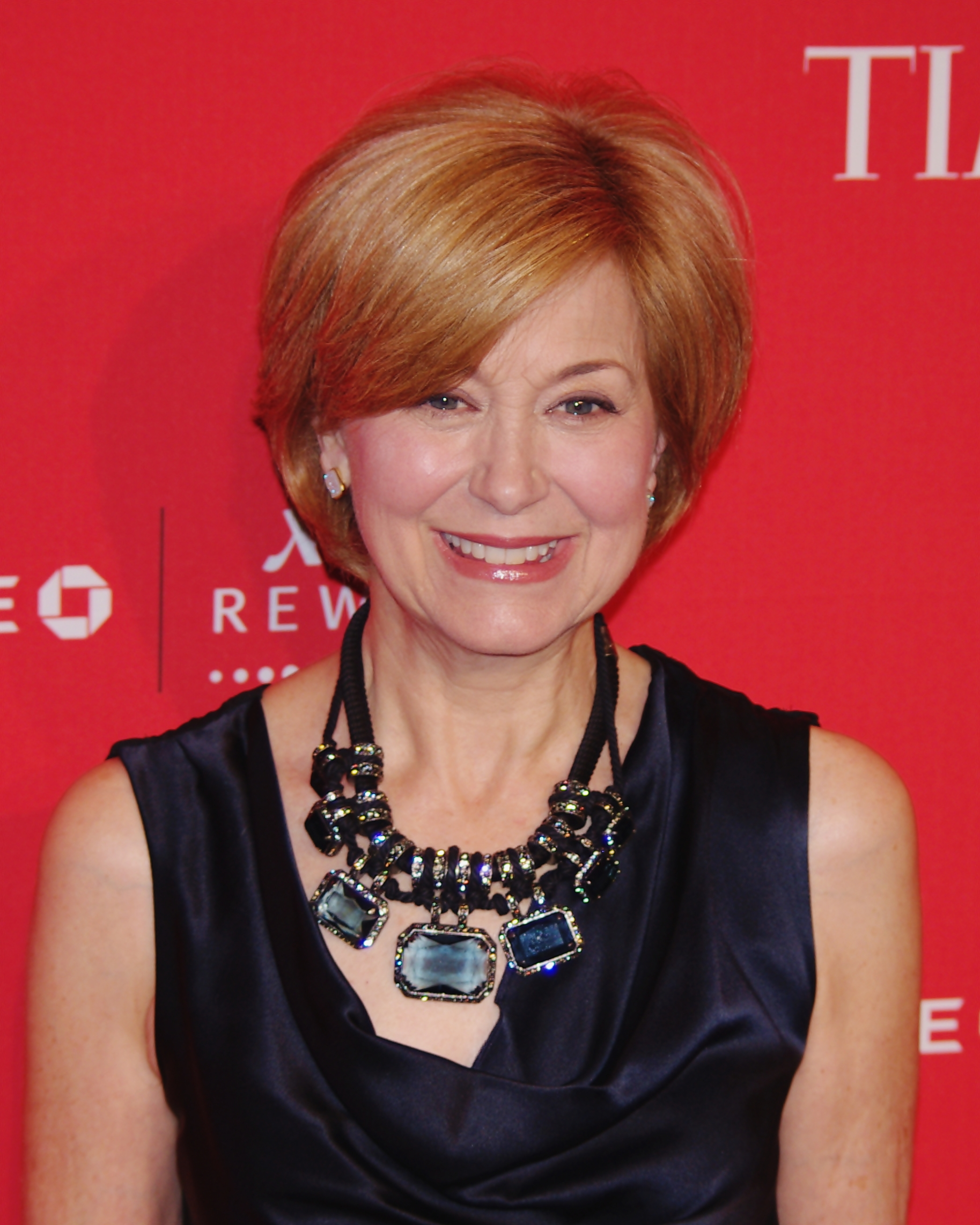
Jane Pauley has hosted the program since 2016.

- Jane Pauley (2016–present)

=== Correspondents ===
- Serena Altschul
- John Blackstone
- Luke Burbank
- Robert Costa
- Lee Cowan
- Seth Doane
- Conor Knighton
- David Martin
- Erin Moriarty
- Barry Petersen
- David Pogue
- Mo Rocca
- Tracy Smith
- Susan Spencer
- Martha Teichner

=== Contributors ===
- Ron Charles - book critic
- Alina Cho
- David Edelstein – film and television critic
- Bill Flanagan – rock music critic
- Jim Gaffigan – commentator
- Nancy Giles – commentator
- Steve Hartman
- Hua Hsu
- Ted Koppel
- Lisa Ling
- Ben Mankiewicz
- Mo Rocca
- Faith Salie – commentator
- Kelefa Sanneh
- Joel Sartore
- Ben Stein – commentator
- Mark Whitaker

=== Notable former on-air staff ===
==== Hosts ====
- Charles Kuralt (1979–1994; now deceased)
- Charles Osgood (1994–2016; now deceased)

==== Correspondents ====
- Rita Braver (1998–2025; now retired)
- Faith Daniels (1988–1989)
- Bill Geist (1987–2018; now retired)
- John Leonard – film, book and drama critic (1988–2004; now deceased)
- Russ Mitchell – now at WKYC in Cleveland
- Ron Powers – film, book and drama critic (1979–1988)
- Richard Schlesinger (1987–2022; now retired)
- Terence Smith – senior correspondent (1990–1998)
- Billy Taylor – jazz and modern music correspondent (1981–2002; now deceased)
- Roger Welsch – Postcards from Nebraska (1988–2001; now deceased)
- Tim Sample – Postcards from Maine (1993–2004)
- Eugenia Zukerman – classical music correspondent (1980–2019)

== Controversy ==
Neurologist Steven Novella and paranormal investigator Joe Nickell wrote in separate Skeptical Inquirer articles about Erin Moriarty's lack of skepticism and "complete journalistic fail" over a March 2018 segment in which she showed clips of spoon-bender Uri Geller from the 1980s performing "'psychic parlor tricks'" but instead of explaining to her audience that Geller had been debunked many times, with no mention of the work of James Randi. Novella stated of Moriarty "is (most likely) just an old-school journalist who thinks of paranormal pieces as 'fluff' pieces that don't require journalistic rigor." In another segment Moriarty interviewed psychic Angela Dellafiora Ford, who claims that she "psychically tracked down fugitive drug smuggler Charlie Jordan in 1989." Nickell writes that Moriarty "simply takes Ford at her word" and "gushes" over her. Nickell states that Ford's claims are an example of "retrofitting" and incorrect.

Center for Inquiry (CFI) editor Kendrick Frazier wrote of his disappointment that CBS would air a pro-paranormal segment with Geller and a psychic detective. They also classified parapsychologist Dean Radin as a scientist, which he is not. In a tweet the next day in response to criticism, Moriarty wrote, "We reported on government experiments with the paranormal – supported by declassified Govt documents. We gave time to both those involved and scientists." Frazier responded, "Just because some part of the government initiated a bizarre little research program at some point in the past, that is not itself a validation of the claims it was studying." Further research by CFI timed the segment and "found it more than 97% pro-paranormal and only three percent skeptical". In a press release, CFI called the Sunday Morning segment a "regrettable lapse ... in the ... usually objective and reliable coverage." and called on the program to "take steps to correct the record" and to "provide a more truthful and scientifically rigorous view of this topic."

== Awards and nominations ==
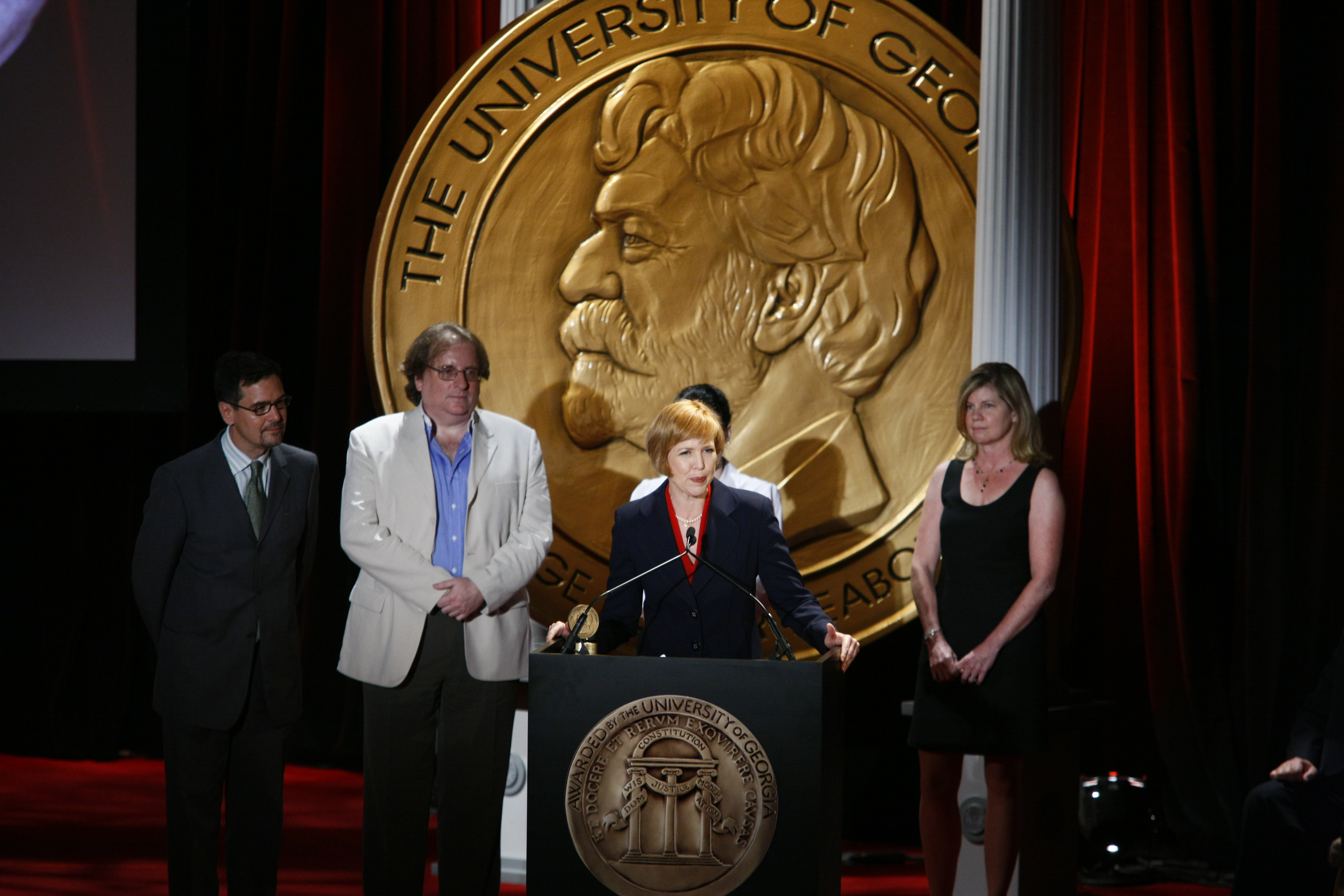
Kimberly Dozier and the crew of CBS Sunday Morning "The Way Home" at the 67th Annual Peabody Awards

The program won its first Daytime Emmy Award for Outstanding Morning Program in 2013, beating out Today and Good Morning America in the category. It also won a Peabody Award in 2007 for the feature segment "The Way Home."

== Nielsen ratings ==
The program's special food-themed edition on November 24, 2013, earned Sunday Morning one of its highest ratings since February 4, 1996, watched by over 6.25 million total viewers.

This was surpassed by the January 18, 2015, broadcast, which had a total viewership of 6.79 million viewers, the second largest audience the program earned since January 23, 1994.

March 1, 2015: 6.63 million viewers (sixth-largest audience since the 1987 advent of Nielsen people meters).

March 22, 2020: 6.82 million viewers (largest audience since 1994).
