= Conny Restle =

German musicologist and museum director

Conny Restle (born 18 November 1960) is a German musicologist, Museum director and lecturer at the Berlin University of the Arts.

== Life ==
Born in Munich, Restle took her Abitur at the humanistic Wilhelmsgymnasium (Munich) in 1980. From 1980 to 1985 she studied Musicology, Latin philology of the Middle Ages and German Philology of the same period at the Ludwig-Maximilians-Universität München. After graduating with a Magister Artium, she worked at the Gesellschaft für Bayerische Musikgeschichte from 1986 to 1989. In 1989 Restle received her doctorate in musicology with a thesis on Bartolomeo Cristofori and the beginnings of the Hammerklavier'.

From 1989 to 1991 she was scientific assistant and responsible coordinator of the research project "harpsichords - hammerclaviere" of the Austrian Science Fund in Vienna. In 1992 Restle went to the Berlin Musical Instrument Museum of the State Institute for Music Research and has held a leading position there since 1994.

Since 2002 Restle has also been director of the Musical Instrument Museum and university professor. In 2012 she was appointed honorary professor at the Berlin University of the Arts.

In addition to keyboard instruments, her research focuses on instruments from antiquity, the Middle Ages and the 16th to early 20th centuries. She also devoted herself to research on acoustics and Historically informed performance.

Restle is a member of the editorial board of musica instrumentalis - Journal for organology.

== Publications ==
- Bartolomeo Cristofori und die Anfänge des Hammerclaviers, Munich 1991
- Berliner Musikinstrumenten-Museum. Bestandskatalog, Berlin o. J. (together with Dagmar Droysen-Reber)
- Neuerwerbungen 1993–1994. 10 Jahre Musikinstrumenten-Museum am Kulturforum, Berlin 1994
- Das Berliner Bach-Cembalo. Ein Mythos und seine Folgen, Berlin 1995 (ed.)
- Faszination Klavier – 300 Jahre Pianofortebau in Deutschland, Munich 2000 (ed.)
- Richard Strauss im kaiserlichen Berlin, Berlin 2001 (ed.)
- Faszination Klarinette, Munich 2004 (ed. with Heike Fricke)
- Beethoven und das Hammerklavier, in Klang und Begriff. Perspektiven musikalischer Theorie und Praxis, hrsg. im Auftrag des Staatlichen Instituts für Musikforschung Preußischer Kulturbesitz, Berlin, by Thomas Ertelt and Conny Restle, vol. 2, Beethovens Klaviervariationen op. 34, Berlin 2007
- Faszination Gitarre, Berlin 2010 (ed. with Christopher Li)
- Ed. with Christian Breternitz: Valve. Brass. Music. 200 Jahre Ventilblasinstrumente, Berlin 2013. ISBN 978-3-89479-836-9
- Good Vibrations. Eine Geschichte der elektronischen Musikinstrumente / A History of Electronic Musical Instruments, Berlin 2017. ISBN 978-3-422-07401-9 (ed. with Benedikt Brilmayer and Sarah-Indriyati Hardjowirogo)
