= Historic Brass Society =

Founded in 1988, The Historic Brass Society (HBS) is an international music organization whose goal is to promote the exchange of serious ideas about the history and performance of brass instruments and music, ranging from Antiquity through the twentieth century.

== Overview ==
The Society was created by participants in the annual Early Brass Festival, founded in 1985, in Amherst, Massachusetts. In a short time the Society grew in size and initiated an ambitious publishing program. Since 1989, it has produced an annual peer-reviewed journal, the Historic Brass Society Journal and in 2021 began publishing a twice-annual e-zine, Historic Brass Today. Additional news and other content can be found on its website, www.historicbrass.org. In addition to these current publications, from 1989 through 2005 it published the Historic Brass Society Newsletter and has published a series of books in conjunction with Pendragon Press, the Bucina book series.

The Historic Brass Society also sponsors workshops, conferences, and symposia world-wide. The Historic Brass Society now has about 300 members from 25 countries.

== Activities ==
The Society has become the principal forum for scholarly research in the field of historic brass instruments, their music, composers and performers. Because it draws its members from both the scholarly and performing communities, it often serves as a liaison between the early brass world and many organizations in other cultural and intellectual communities. The Society has participated in Congresses of the International Musicological Society since 1997 and has organized study sessions at annual conferences of the American Musicological Society. It has organized conferences in collaboration with the Galpin Society, American Musical Instrument Society, CIMCIM, and other organizations and has presented conferences at many distinguished institutions including Yale University, Oxford University, Oberlin College, Cité de la Musique (Paris), The Institute for Jazz Studies of Rutgers University, Edinburgh University, the Horniman Museum (London), the Royal College of Music (London), Indiana University, and Wake Forest University, to name a few.

== Key Officials ==
Founder Jeffrey Nussbaum served as the Society's president from 1989 through 2021. In 2020 the Society's by laws were rewritten and annual elections with term limits for all elected offices except for secretary were implemented to promote greater participation by the Society's Membership. The vice president is elected and serves for two years as president-elect before becoming president for an additional two years. The secretary serves for a three year term and members of the board are elected to serve three year terms with a limit of two consecutive terms.

The Society's Board of Directors also includes many leading scholars and performers. Members of the Society include scholars, teachers, professional and amateur performers, students, instrument collectors, museum curators, and others.

== Publications ==
The Historic Brass Journal is a scholarly peer-reviewed publication that has published articles ranging from Antiquity through to the twentieth century and early jazz, written by leading authorities, including Don Smithers, Edward H. Tarr, Reine Dahlqvist, Herbert Heyde, Keith Polk, Renato Meucci, Trevor Herbert, and many others. The Historic Brass Journal is overseen by its own editorial board consisting of internationally known scholars with further oversight by the Society's board of directors.

The e-zine Historic Brass Today offers the Society's members a wide range of less formal material, including interviews with performers, makers, collectors, and brass teachers including articles in languages other than English. Its international staff and contributors consists of scholars, performer-scholars, collectors and amateurs from the full range of the Society's Membership.

From 1989 to 2005, the HBS published a newsletter, The Historic Brass Society Newsletter.

The Society's website contains additional news items, articles, reviews and interviews These include articles on instrument collections and an ongoing series on early brass instrument makers and their work, as well as reviews of CDs, music, and books, and the extensive News of the Field section, as well as real-time discussion groups.

The Society has a YouTube channel where Society events including concerts and scholarly presentations from past events can be viewed.
