= Albert Leeson =

Albert Leeson (1904-1946) was an English bow maker.

Albert Leeson worked for the firm W.E. Hill & Sons, starting as an apprentice in 1920 and quickly learning to making the finest fleur-de-lys bows (mounted in silver, gold, or tortoiseshell). He was one of William C Retford's favorite pupils, and was quickly put to work on the finest bows, eventually being allowed to work totally unsupervised which was rare. Albert was also a keen violinist.

He was accidentally killed by a London bus in 1946. His bows are marked with number 3 on the tip under the bow hair.
