= Dagmar Droysen-Reber =

German musicologist and museum director (1928–2020)

Dagmar Droysen-Reber (25 August 1928 – 20 February 2020) was a German musicologist and museum director.

== Life and career ==
Dagmar Droysen-Reber was born in Barmen on 25 August 1928. After studying musicology, experimental physics and Romance studies and obtaining her doctorate as Dr. phil., she initially worked as a piano teacher and held various honorary positions in international musicological associations.

In the State Institute for Music Research she was initially head of the acoustics department until 1984. In 1989 she was appointed director of the Berlin Musical Instrument Museum and was provisional director from 1989 to 1992 and until 31 August 1994 as the predecessor of Thomas Ertelt director of the State Institute for Music Research.

Her successor at the museum is Conny Restle.

Droysen-Reber died in Berlin on 20 February 2020, at the age of 91.

== Awards ==
- 1986: Verdienstkreuz am Bande der Bundesrepublik Deutschland

== Publications ==
- Jahrbuch des Staatlichen Instituts für Musikforschung, 1968 1968 ff., ISSN 0572-6239
- Staatliches Institut für Musikforschung Preußischer Kulturbesitz (ed.): Wege zur Musik. Herausgegeben anläßlich der Eröffnung des neuen Hauses. Redaction: Dagmar Droysen-Reber. SIMPK, Berlin 1984, ISBN 3-922378-04-8
- Berliner Musikinstrumenten-Museum. Bestandskatalog, Berlin o. J. (together with Conny Restle)
- Harfen des Berliner Musikinstrumentenmusems, Bestandskatalog in cooperation with Beat Wolf, Wolfgang Mertin, Rainer M. Thurau. Ed.: Staatliches Institut für Musikforschung Preußischer Kulturbesitz, Berlin 1999
