= Benedikt Brilmayer =

German musicologist

Benedikt Brilmayer (born in 1980) is a German musicologist with a focus on organology at the Berlin Musical Instrument Museum.

== Life ==
Born in Munich, Brilmayer studied musicology, cultural management and psychology at the Hochschule für Musik Franz Liszt, Weimar and at the Friedrich-Schiller-Universität Jena. As a student he already worked for a joint research project of the University of Music Weimar and the Klassik Stiftung Weimar in the field of organology.

From 2011 he worked on his thesis at the University of Augsburg, where he also taught. He was awarded a doctorate in 2015 at the University of Augsburg with the thesis Das Trautonium. Prozesse des Technologietransfers im Musikinstrumentenbau.

From 2015, he also began working as an institute assistant, and from 2017, finally as a research assistant and curator at the Museum of Musical Instruments in Berlin. He curated the exhibition "Good Vibrations. A History of Electronic Musical Instruments". He publishes instrumental studies with a focus on electronic musical instruments and teaches at several colleges and universities, such as the State University of Music and Performing Arts Stuttgart and the Humboldt University of Berlin.

== Publications ==
- Johann David Heinichen's Comprehensive Instruction on Basso Continuo with Historical Biographies.
- Berlin: Elektropolis des Instrumentenbaus?.
- Das Trautonium. Prozesse des Technologietransfers im Musikinstrumentenbau. Augsburg 2017
- Good Vibrations. Eine Geschichte der elektronischen Musikinstrumente / A History of Electronic Musical Instruments, Berlin 2017. ISBN 978-3-422-07401-9 (ed. with Sarah-Indriyati Hardjowirogo and Conny Restle)
- Johann David Heinichen's Gründliche Anweisung (1711) translated by Benedikt Brilmayer and Casey Mongoven, Hillsdale, NY 2012.
