= Ertelt =

Ertelt is a surname. Notable people with the surname include:

- Sebastian Ertelt (fl. 2012–2022), American politician
- Thomas Ertelt (born 1955), German musicologist
