= Bultitude =

Bultitude is a surname. Notable people with the surname include:

- Arthur Bultitude (1908–1990), English musical instrument bow maker
- Elizabeth Bultitude (1809–1890), British Primitive Methodist preacher
- Paul Bultitude (born 20th century), English musician and record producer
