= Edgar Hunt =

Edgar Hubert Hunt
- Teaching at a recorder workshop at the Bate Collection in Oxford in 2001

Background information
- Born: 28 June 1909; Clifton, Bristol, England
- Died: 16 March 2006 (aged 96)
- Occupations: Musicologist, recorder player, teacher

Edgar Hubert Hunt (28 June 1909 – 16 March 2006) was a British musician and musicologist. He was a key figure in the early music revival in Britain in general, and in the revival of the recorder in particular. He was a founding member of the Society of Recorder Players, of which he was musical director for more than fifty years, and of the Galpin Society, of which he was later president. He was head of the early music department at Trinity College of Music, which was the first conservatory in the world to introduce a diploma in recorder.

== Early life ==
Hunt was born at 2 Upper Byron Place, Clifton, Bristol, on 28 June 1909, into a musical family. His father Hubert Hunt had since 1901 been the organist and master of choristers at Bristol Cathedral, and was conductor of the Bristol Madrigal Society and musical director of the Bristol Gentlemen's Musical Club, while his mother, Clara Harriett née Clements, had been a singer and teacher of music but had given it up on her marriage. Among his father's friends were Sir Walford Davies, Edmund Fellowes and Eric Marshall Johnson.

Hunt went to Bristol Grammar School and in 1927 got a scholarship to study flute at Trinity College of Music, London, where he studied under Albert Fransella and Robert Murchie. He took his diploma in 1930 but continued to attend the college until 1933; he took further lessons, and tried without success to obtain a BMus degree from Durham University. From 1933 to 1936 he undertook an apprenticeship in the music printing works of the music publishing house Novello & Co., and when it was over worked there for a further year. In 1937 he began working at the London branch of music publishers Schott and Co. in Great Marlborough Street.

== The recorder ==
The director of studies at Trinity was Sir Joseph Cox Bridge, who had previously been organist of Chester Cathedral, and had in 1886 discovered in the stores of the Chester Archaeological Society a remarkable consort of recorders by Peter Bressan, the Chester Recorders. Through him, Hunt became interested in the instrument. He first heard it played on 2 October 1928, at a concert of the German Singers, a touring German choir which interspersed instrumental pieces by Purcell, played on recorders and strings, with the choral numbers; he was inspired by its purity of tone. He began teaching the recorder in schools, using imported German instruments, during the 1930s.

With Carl Dolmetsch, along with his friends Max and Stephanie Champion, Hunt founded the Society of Recorder Players in 1937 and co-edited Recorder News from 1937 to 1941. In collaboration with Mark Barnes of Barnes and Mullins he began to design plastic recorders, which were manufactured by the music publishers Schotts throughout the war. With Walter Bergmann he developed a catalogue of recorder music, and Schotts became the leading publisher of music for the recorder. Low cost plastic recorders (which maintained eighteenth-century fingering, unlike cheap German instruments with simplified fingering that compromised tuning), became widely used in schools throughout the world.

== Legacy ==
Hunt's collection of historic recorders is now in the Bate Collection of Musical Instruments in Oxford, together with various prototypes he made during his career as maker and designer of instruments. His papers, together with those of his father, Hubert Hunt, and his sister Enid, former archivist of the Bristol Madrigal Society, were donated by Hunt's daughter to the Centre for the History of Music in Britain, the Empire and the Commonwealth in the music department of the University of Bristol.
