= Gottfried Reiche =

German trumpet player 1667–1734

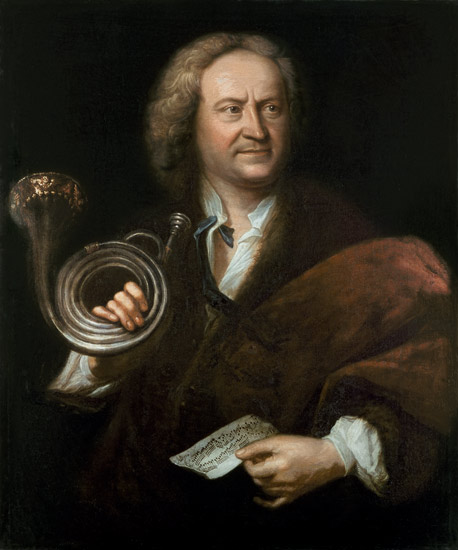
Portrait, oil on canvas of Gottfried Reiche (1667–1734) by Elias Gottlob Haussmann (1695–1774), 1727

Gottfried Reiche (German pronunciation: [ˈɡɔtfʁiːt ˈʁaɪçə]; 5 February 1667 – 6 October 1734) was a German trumpet player and composer of the Baroque era. Reiche is best known for having been Johann Sebastian Bach's chief trumpeter at Leipzig from Bach's arrival there in 1723 until Reiche's death.

== Biography ==
Reiche was introduced to trumpet playing at an early age – he was born in Weissenfels, Germany a town with a long tradition of trumpet music at its court. He moved to Leipzig in 1688, and eventually succeeded trumpeter Johann C. Genzmer there as Senior Stadtmusicus in 1719.

Reiche's reputation as a skilled trumpet player is reflected in the technically demanding parts Bach wrote for him. Bach's Leipzig compositions contain some of the more elaborate trumpet writing of the Baroque period, including extensive passages in the high clarino register, indicating the advanced technical abilities expected of the player.

He is the subject of a well-known portrait painted by Leipzig artist E.G. Haussmann, in 1727, on the occasion of his 60th birthday. In the portrait, Reiche holds a coiled natural trumpet (Ger. Jägertrompete, trans. hunting trumpet) in his right hand and a sheet of music in his left. The manuscript contains the melody commonly known as Abblasen, which has been reconstructed and performed as a trumpet fanfare. The musical notes are depicted accurately in the painting, and the fanfare has been transcribed and performed by several artists. It has also served for many years as the theme music to the American television show CBS Sunday Morning.

While Reiche himself composed many such Abblasen and other "tower music" (Turmmusik) (most of which is lost), some scholars believe that the style of the music in the portrait hints at possibly being composed by J.S. Bach himself, perhaps as a birthday gift for his chief trumpeter.

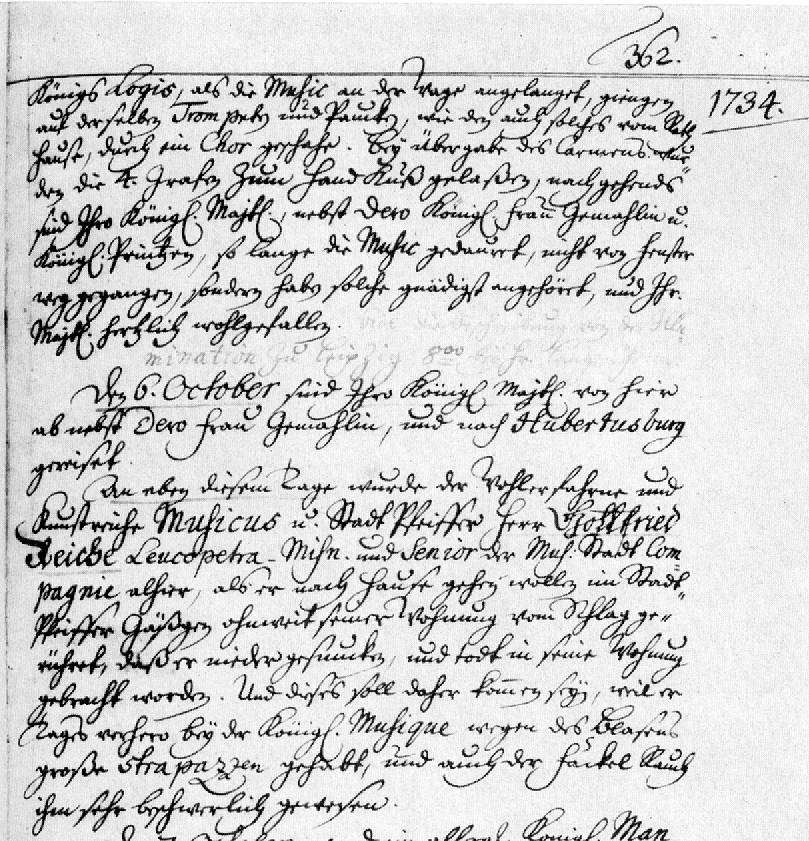
Chronicle of Leipzig for 5 and 6 October 1734, reporting Reiche's death

Reiche died of a stroke in Leipzig, Germany, collapsing in the street while walking home one night. A contemporary account attributed the stroke to the strain of having played trumpet the previous evening, with "his condition having been greatly aggravated from the smoke given off by the torch-lights", when he participated in the performance of Bach's congratulatory cantata Preise dein Glücke, gesegnetes Sachsen, BWV 215.

After his death, Reiche was succeeded by Christoph Ruhe.

== Literature ==
- Don Smithers, Gottfried Reiches Ansehen und sein Einfluß auf die Musik Johann Sebastian Bachs, Bach-Jahrbuch 73, p. 113-150, 1987
- Don Smithers, Bach, Reiche and the Leipzig Collegia Musica, Historic Brass Society Journal 2, p. 1-51, 1990
- The Ewald Brass Quintet's recording of the complete Vierundzwanzig neue Quatricinien (1696): Hungaroton HCD 32451
