= Galpin Society =

Musicology research group

The Galpin Society was formed in October 1946 to further research into the branch of musicology known as organology, that is the history, construction, development and use of musical instruments. Based in the United Kingdom, it is named after the British organologist and musical instrument collector, Canon Francis William Galpin (1858–1945), who had a lifelong interest in studying, collecting, playing, making and writing about musical instruments. It is a membership society and registered charity. The membership in 1999 was around a thousand.

The society's founder members were keen to form a society to promote the historical study of all kinds of musical instruments. The founding members included academics, professional and amateur performers, and private collectors, including Anthony Baines, Robert Donington, Hugh Gough, Eric Halfpenny, Edgar Hunt, Eric Marshall Johnson, Lyndesay Langwill, Reginald Morley-Pegge, F. Geoffrey Rendall and Maurice Vincent. Philip Bate was the inaugural chairman of the society and Professor Jack Westrup, Heather Professor of Music at the University of Oxford, served as its first president. One of the inaugural vice-presidents was the widow of Arnold Dolmetsch, and the others included Walter F. H. Blandford, Adam Carse and Rosamond E. M. Harding. Bate later served as president (1977–99).

The society brought the relatively unknown term organology, coined in 1941 by Nicholas Bessaraboff, to the attention of a wider public. Its exhibition of 330 British-made instruments at the Arts Council's premises in St James's Square for the 1951 Festival of Britain brought together a "collection unsurpassed in its representative completeness" and attracted over 6000 visitors. It was the subject of a contemporary BBC television programme and was covered in Punch. The society organised conferences in Cambridge with the International Association of Music Libraries in 1959, and in Edinburgh with the Historic Brass Society in 1994, and again in 1999. In 1996, the society organised a visit to musical collections in Leipzig, Halle and Markneukirchen in Germany. It continues to organise occasional conferences and visits.

The society publishes the Galpin Society Journal, founded in 1948, for research in the field of organology in the UK. The founding editor was Thurston Dart (1948–56). The first issue was described by the American musicologist Karl Geiringer as the "only periodical of its kind published at present in English"; a review in The Times describes its contents as "very varied matter" that was accessible to the "ordinary student or amateur of music". In 1957, Anthony Baines took over from Dart as editor (1956–63 and also 1970–84), with Eric Halfpenny serving in 1963–70. The society formerly published a Bulletin three times a year, and now produces an online newsletter three times a year containing reviews of museum exhibitions, events and books on musical instruments.

The society's entry in Grove Music Online describes the society as influential on performance, particularly based on research into historical techniques, as well as on the use of period instruments.
