= Gesellschaft der Freunde alter Musikinstrumente =

Swiss organological society

The Gesellschaft der Freunde alter Musikinstrumente (GEFAM; from German: Society of friends of old musical instruments) was founded in 1951 in Zürich, Switzerland, by a number of music lovers and collectors of historical musical instruments. It is still the only society in the German-speaking part of Europe (Germany, Austria, Switzerland, Liechtenstein) that is concerned mainly with old musical instruments and organology. Thanks to its base in Switzerland it has a multicultural and multilanguage profile, visual in its international list of members. Today there are over 200 members (individuals and institutions), mainly in Europe, but also on other parts of the globe. The spectrum includes specialised museums and collections of old musical instruments, researchers and instrument makers as well as private collectors and enthusiasts.

The society is a forum in which public and private collections of musical instruments are visited and aspects of conservation are discussed, whereby the history of the musical instruments is given special consideration. Occasionally extra-European instruments are regarded as well. In addition to these aspects the society also contributes to discussions between museum "specialists", instrument makers, universities and conservatories on the one hand and private collectors and others interested in old musical instruments on the other.

== Publications ==
The society publishes the biannual academic journal Glareana (eJournal) with society news and articles on subjects pertaining to musical instruments covering topics ranging from historical and critical musicology to music theory and organology, ethnomusicology, and music iconographical studies. It has also published several monographs.
