= Philip Bate =

British musician and collector of musical instruments

Philip Argall Turner Bate (1909–1999) was a musicologist, broadcaster and collector of musical instruments.

== Early life and education ==
Bate was born in Glasgow on 26 March 1909. His father, Percy Herbert Bate, was secretary to the Glasgow Museum of Arts. His mother, Mary Turner, was a keen musician who played piano and violin and sang in Charles Sanford Terry's Bach Choir in Aberdeen. His father did not like music in the house, but allowed him to sing nursery rhymes accompanied by his mother at the piano. His father became curator of Aberdeen's Municipal Art Gallery and Museum and died when Philip was four. During his attendance at Aberdeen Grammar School Bate heard a schools concert given by the Scottish Orchestra and was inspired to learn to play the clarinet. He won a Carnegie award to study at the University of Aberdeen, where he took an honours degree in pure science in 1932.

== Broadcasting ==
Bate had intended to continue his studies as a postgraduate in geology but having been a member of the university's dramatic societies and with the new drama department of the Aberdeen station of the BBC frequently choosing him for amateur cast broadcasts, not least for his English accent, he applied for and was appointed to a post with the corporation in London. Bate spent the majority of his career working for the BBC's music department — starting as a balance control assistant between 1934 and 1937 and then as a studio manager from 1937 to 1939. On 21 July 1936, Bate married Sheila Glassford Begg, from whom he was later divorced. During the Second World War, Bate worked in military censorship, and was then recalled by the BBC to produce the recording of James Blades playing the drumbeat used as the symbol of the BBC European Service's resistance broadcasts. Following the war Bate continued to work in television, as a producer for the Empire Music Service between 1946 and 1956.

Bate was involved in producing the early live broadcasts of the Edinburgh Festival and pioneered many live interview programmes, such as The Conductor Speaks, with Sir Henry Wood, Sir Malcolm Sargent, Sir Thomas Beecham, and Leopold Stokowski. Bate later realised the potential of ballet on television and produced Dame Margot Fonteyn's first television appearance, encouraging groups like the Paris Opéra Ballet to visit Britain for the first time. Between 1956 and 1967 he undertook senior training positions for the BBC, spending his last working year as the first head of training at the new communications centre in Dublin. On 23 May 1959 Bate married his second wife, Yvonne Mary Leigh-Pollitt.

== Legacy ==
Beginning from the time he was at school, Bate had been interested in musical instruments, which he began to collect and study. He would visit junk shops and markets to seek out items: one clarinet from a market stall cost him a week's pocket money — his first flute, by William Henry Potter, was given to him by friends, and the next he inherited from his flautist grandfather. Whilst in London he would frequent the Caledonian Road, Portobello, and Bermondsey markets, making friendships with those who shared his interests, such as Canon Francis Galpin, who encouraged Bate to turn his scientific education to the study of musical instruments. Bate used his carpentry skills to make and restore instruments in his collection and after learning metalworking techniques, made reproductions of draw-trumpets used by David Munrow's Early Music Consort of London.

In 1946 Bate and a group of friends founded the Galpin Society, the first group to specialize in the history and study of musical instruments. He was its first chairman and from 1977 was its president. As well as writing articles for the Grove Dictionary of Music and Musicians, Bate wrote the books The Oboe (1956), The Trumpet and Trombone (1966), and The Flute: a Study of its History, Development and Construction (1969).

By the time he was 60, his collection of musical instruments covered the history of woodwind from 1680 onwards and included brass instruments and a collection of printed instrument tutors. Convinced that the collection was of value to those concerned with the interpretation of music, and that the instruments should be used and properly maintained, he gave the Bate Collection of Musical Instruments to the University of Oxford in 1968, on the condition that it was used for teaching and was provided with a specialist curator to care for and lecture on it. Bate continued to add to the collection, and it grew through the acquisition of collections made by many of his friends and colleagues in the Galpin Society.

Bate was made an honorary Master of Arts by Oxford University in 1973. Philip Bate died on 3 November 1999, in the Whittington Hospital, Islington and was cremated. His ashes were interred in the music faculty garden next to the Bate Collection in Oxford.

== Bibliography ==
- The Clarinet: Some notes upon its history and construction by F. Geoffrey Rendall and Philip Bate. London: E. Benn. Third edition, revised and with some additional material by Bate, 1971. ISBN 0-510-36701-1
- The Flute: A study of its history, development, and construction by Philip Bate. London: E. Benn, 1969. Second edition 1979. ISBN 0-510-36350-4
- The Oboe: An outline of its history, development, and construction by Philip Bate. London: E. Benn, 1956. Second edition 1962. Third edition 1975. ISBN 0-510-36250-8
- The Trumpet and Trombone: An outline of their history, development and construction by Philip Bate. London: E. Benn, 1966. Second edition 1978. ISBN 0-510-36412-8
