= Handel Reference Database =

Archive of material relating to Handel

The Handel Reference Database (HRD) is the largest documentary collection on George Frideric Handel (1685–1759) and his times. It was launched in January 2008 on the server of the Center for Computer Assisted Research in the Humanities (CCARH) at Stanford University. Originally assembled by Ilias Chrissochoidis to support his PhD dissertation "Early Reception of Handel's Oratorios, 1732–1784: Narrative-Studies-Documents" (Stanford University, 2004), it now includes about 4,000 items and 800,000 words. HRD is organized chronologically, covering the period from 1685 to 1784 and focusing on Handel's British career and reception. It includes transcriptions of printed and manuscript sources, some of which remain unpublished ("The Academy of Vocal Music", British Library, Add. Ms. 11732; "The John Marsh Diaries, 1802–28", Huntington Library, HM 54457, vols. 23–37) and external links to early secondary literature on the composer. The project received financial support from Houghton Library, Harvard University (2010–11) and UCLA's William Andrews Clark Memorial Library (2011–12).

HRD is listed in An International Handel Bibliography / Internationale Händel-Bibliographie: 1959–2009. Links to the database are available from the web portals of the American Musicological Society (AMS), the American Society for Eighteenth-Century Studies (ASECS), the British Society for Eighteenth-Century Studies (BSECS), the Society for Eighteenth-Century Music (SECM), the Stiftung Händel-Haus in Halle, the Foundling Museum, and the library catalogs of Stanford University, Harvard University, Yale University, UC Berkeley's, University College London's, and the University of Bologna's library services.

== See also ==
- Virtual Library of Musicology
