= Curt Sachs =

German musicologist (1881–1959)

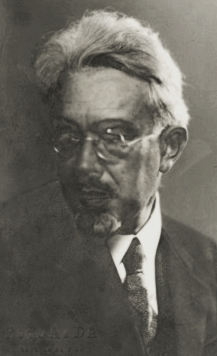
- Sachs in 1935
- Born: June 29, 1881; Berlin, German Empire
- Died: February 5, 1959 (aged 77); New York, New York, US

Academic background
- Education: Französisches Gymnasium
- Alma mater: Berlin University

Academic work
- Discipline: Organology
- Institutions: Staatliche Instrumentensammlung; New York University
- Notable works: "Systematik der Musikinstrumente" (1914); The History of Musical Instruments (1940)

Curt Sachs (German: [zaks]; 29 June 1881 – 5 February 1959) was a German musicologist. He was one of the founders of modern organology (the study of musical instruments). Among his contributions was the Hornbostel–Sachs system, which he created with Erich von Hornbostel.

== Biography ==
Born in Berlin, Sachs studied piano, music theory and composition as a youth in that city. However, his doctorate from Berlin University (where he was later professor of musicology) in 1904 was on the history of art, with his thesis on the sculpture of Verrocchio. He began a career as an art historian, but promptly became more devoted to music, eventually being appointed director of the Staatliche Instrumentensammlung, a large collection of musical instruments. He reorganised and restored much of the collection, and his career as an organologist began.

In 1913, Sachs saw the publication of his book Real-Lexicon der Musikinstrumente, probably the most comprehensive survey of musical instruments in 200 years. The following year, he and Erich Moritz von Hornbostel published the work for which they are probably now best known in Zeitschrift für Ethnologie, a new system of musical instrument classification. It is today known as the Sachs-Hornbostel system. It has been much revised over the years, and has been the subject of some criticism, but it remains the most widely used system of classification by ethnomusicologists and organologists.

In 1933, the Nazis came to power. Sachs was dismissed from his posts in Germany by the Nazi Party because he was a Jew. Sachs moved to Paris, later to the United States, where he settled in New York City. From 1937 to 1953 he taught at New York University, and also worked at the New York Public Library. In 1953, he was appointed adjunct professor at Columbia University, a post he held until his death in 1959. He was a member of the American Musicological Society and served as president from 1948 to 1950.

His numerous books include works on rhythm, dance and musical instruments, with his The History of Musical Instruments (1940), a comprehensive survey of musical instruments worldwide throughout history, seen as one of the most important. The long relationship he had with W. W. Norton & Company began with The Rise of Music in the Ancient World (1943). Although these works have been superseded by more recent research in some respects, they are still seen as essential texts in the field.

Sachs died in 1959 in New York City. In honor of Sachs's legacy, the American Musical Instrument Society established the Curt Sachs Award in 1983, which it gives each year to an individual who has made significant contributions to field of organology.

== See also ==
- Berlin Musical Instrument Museum
- State Institute for Music Research
