= Thomas Ertelt =

German musicologist (born 1955)

Thomas F. Ertelt (born 5 April 1955) is a German musicologist. Until his retirement in August 2021, he had been Institut director of the State Institute for Music Research in Berlin.

== Life ==
Born in Weingarten, Ertelt studied musicology and Germanistic at the Freie Universität Berlin (with Rudolf Stephan). In 1989 he received his doctorate with his work on A. Berg's opera Lulu. The same year, Ertelt went to the Berlin Musical Instrument Museum of the Staatliches Institut für Musikforschung Berlin (SIMPK) and has been working there in leading positions as successor of Dagmar Droysen-Reber since 1994.

Ertelt's research focuses primarily on the music of the Second Viennese School and the history of music theory. He is publisher of the Geschichte der Musiktheorie, correspondence of members of the Viennese School, and the series Klang und Begriff.

== Publications ==
- Klang und Begriff. Perspektiven musikalischer Theorie und Praxis. Ed. on behalf of the Staatliches Institut für Musikforschung Preußischer Kulturbesitz, Berlin, by Thomas Ertelt and Conny Restle, vol. 2, Beethovens Klaviervariationen op. 34, Berlin 2007
