= Bibliography of Music Literature =

International bibliography of literature on music

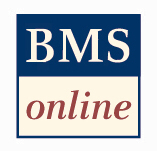
Logo of BMS online

The Bibliography of Music Literature (BMS or BMS online, German: Bibliographie des Musikschrifttums) is an international bibliography of literature on music. It considers all kind of music and includes both current and older literature. Since 1968, the BMS editorial staff has also been working as the German committee for the Répertoire International de Littérature Musicale (RILM). The bibliography includes monographs, master’s theses and doctoral dissertations, articles and reviews from journals, Festschriften, conference proceedings, yearbooks, anthologies, and essays from critical reports. It contains printed media as well as online resources, data media, sound recordings, audiovisual media, and microforms. Each record provides the title in the original language (for East European- and Asian entries a German translation is added), full bibliographic data, a keyword index, and mostly an abstract. Currently, BMS online has more than 315,000 records of literature on music. It is supplemented by the OLC-SSG Musicology, which incorporates the contents of some more 150 music journals from 1993 onward. BMS online participates actively on Virtual Library of Musicology (ViFaMusik), the central gateway for music and musicology in Germany.

== Format ==
BMS was established in 1936 by the State Institute for Music Research in Berlin with the aim to list literature on music from all over the world. It was published in print from 1936 through 1988. Currently it is available as BMS online in a cumulative online database, which is updated in real-time.

== History ==
Established in 1936, the BMS resumed the bibliographic surveys printed in the Jahrbücher der Musikbibliothek Peters. The first BMS editor was Kurt Taut, who was succeeded by Georg Karstädt. Originally printed by Friedrich Hofmeister in Leipzig (Leipzig: Hofmeister, 1936-1941 [volumes 1.1936 to 4.1939]), after a span of four years BMS was stopped due to wartime limitations. The commencement of this bibliographic enterprise after World War II is owed to the musicologist and librarian Wolfgang Schmieder. On behalf of the reconstituted State Institute for Music Research the first volume for 1950/51 appeared in 1954. Since that time the Bibliography of Music Literature has been a regular publication of the Staatliches Institut für Musikforschung. The last volume in print format was published in 2001 and covered the year 1988 (Frankfurt am Main: Hofmeister, 1954-1968 [volumes 1.1950/51 to 6.1960], Mainz: Schott, 1969-2001 [volumes 1961 to 1988]). Since 2006, there has been the Bibliography of Music Literature as BMS online.

== See also ==
- State Institute for Music Research, Berlin
- Virtual Library of Musicology
- RILM

== Bibliography ==
- Kurt Taut (Ed.) Bibliographie des Musikschrifttums
  - 1.Jg, 07-12.1936, Leipzig 1937 Internet Archive
  - 2.Jg, 01-12.1937, Leipzig 1938 Internet Archive
- Wolfgang Schmieder (Ed.) Bibliographie des Musikschrifttums
  - 1950-51, Frankfurt 1954 Internet Archive
  - 1952-53, Frankfurt 1956 Internet Archive
  - 1954-55, Frankfurt 1957 Internet Archive
- Jacquelin Barber Toy, A Bibliography of English- and German-Language Music Periodicals Indexed Before 1949, in series of K.S.U. master's degree research documents, Sources of Music Periodical Indexing. N.B.: "A research report submitted to the Kent State University School of Library Science in partial fulfillment of the requirements for the degree of Master of Library Science, August 1969"
- Silvia C. E. Mai, Anforderung an eine Datenbank im SIM - Staatliches Institut für Musikforschung, Berlin 2004 [A preliminary study for the online database: BMS online]
- Carsten Schmidt, “Die Bibliographie des Musikschrifttums (BMS) ist online”, Forum Musikbibliothek - Beiträge und Informationen aus der musikbibliothekarischen Praxis 28/1 (2007) 10-13
- Oliver Schwab-Felisch/ Fred Mengering/ David van der Kemp, “Zur wissenschaftlichen Musikliteratur in den USA und in Deutschland. Eine empirisch-statistische Studie auf der Basis des Répertoire International de Littérature Musicale (RILM)”, Zeitschrift der Gesellschaft für Musiktheorie - ZGMTH 2/3 (2005) 53-99
- Christine Siegert, “Musikwissenschaft digital - Probleme und Chancen einer Virtuellen Fachbibliothek Musik”, Die Musikforschung 64/4 (2011) 383-386
