= Virtual Library of Musicology =

Online music resource

The Virtual Library of Musicology (German: Virtuelle Fachbibliothek Musikwissenschaft, commonly shortened to ViFaMusik) had been funded by the German Research Foundation (German: Deutsche Forschungsgemeinschaft) to provide sources and materials for music and musicology. The project was active from July 2005 to March 2020 at the Bavarian State Library, in cooperation with the State Institute for Musicological Research in Berlin and the German Musicological Society. It has been superseded by the musiconn musicology service.

== Description ==
ViFaMusik, the central portal for music and musicology, offered access to an extensive digital library containing scholarly research and online resources such as bibliographical data, entries to experts and research projects as well as current events on search topics. The available material included items from the inventory of the Bavarian State Library and sources and databases from other institutions.

== See also ==
- Handel Reference Database
- International Musicological Society
