= Arthur Bultitude =

Arthur Richard Bultitude (14 January 1908 – 1990) MBE was an English musical instrument bow maker, who spent much of his life working as a craftsman for the firm of W.E. Hill & Sons. Bultitude was brought to and introduced to the Hill shop by William Napier (father of Frank Napier another exceptional Hill bow maker) at the age of 14. Bultitude developed a close relationship with William Charles Retford, one of the foremost Hill makers after James Tubbs. Bultitude worked for the Hill shop from 1922 until 1961, after which he set up his own shop where he continued to make bows based on the same model set up by Alfred Hill (the Tourte model). However he slowly moved away and made individual Bows built to suit particular customers. His bows are typically decorated with a silver Tudor Rose. The bows made for W.E. Hill & Sons are marked with number 6 on the tip under the bow hair. Bultitude was elected as Master of the Art Workers' Guild.

== Sources ==
- Profile at Hill Bows
- Bows and Bowmakers – W.C. Retford 1964
- W.E. Hill & Sons (A Tribute) – Richard Sadler 1996 ISBN 0-9504357-2-4
- Roda, Joseph (1959). Bows for Musical Instruments. Chicago: W. Lewis. OCLC 906667.
