= Forschungsinstitut für Musiktheater =

German research institute

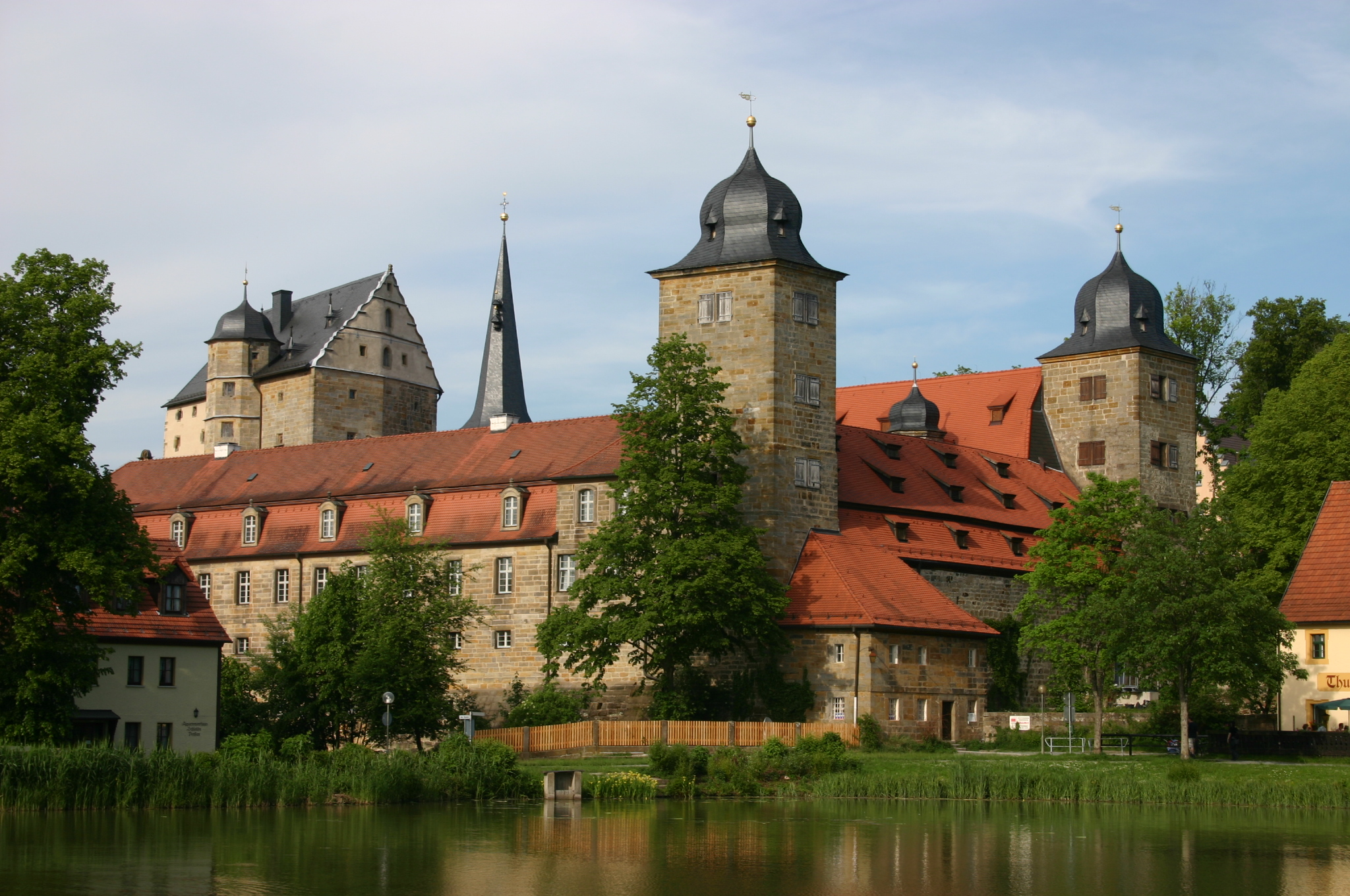
Thurnau Castle, lakeside view

The Forschungsinstitut für Musiktheater (FIMT) is a research institute for the study of opera and music theater. It is located in the Thurnau Castle, Thurnau, near Bayreuth, Bavaria.

FIMT is associated with the University of Bayreuth. The director of the Institute has also been chair of Theater Studies with Focus on Music Theatre at the University of Bayreuth, and the staff of FIMT teach Music Theater and related subjects at the university, including musicology, Theater Studies, and Media Studies.

FIMT grants Bachelor of Arts degrees in "Musiktheaterwissenschaft", and Master of Arts and Ph.D. degrees in "Musik und Performance" and "Oper und Performance".

== History ==
The Research Institute for Music Theatre Studies was founded in 1976 with the participation of Pierre Boulez, Carl Dahlhaus, Werner Egk, August Everding, and Wolfgang Wagner as a central institution of the University of Bayreuth. Since 1977, it has been based at Thurnau Castle, where it has a specialist library containing around 40,000 items of media, and a programme collection numbering approximately 30,000. From 1983 to 2006, the Institute was directed by Sieghart Döhring, who placed one of his research focuses on the opera composer Giacomo Meyerbeer. From 1986 to 1997, together with Carl Dahlhaus, the Institute published Piper's Encyclopaedia of Music Theatre, a seven-volume handbook in which almost 2,500 works of music theatre are described in detail. Since 2006, the Institute has been headed by Prof. Dr. Anno Mungen. His academic work focuses on the approach of analysing opera, music theatre, and music through their performance, including important perspectives such as gender and mediality. Since the Institute returned to the restored premises of the Hans-Georgen building in 2007, chamber concerts as well as experimental performance formats have been realised in the Ahnensaal of Thurnau Castle. A number of renowned scholars have worked at fimt over the decades and have made significant contributions to research on music theatre. These include Gabriele Brandstetter, Maren Butte, Markus Engelhardt, Rainer Franke, Melanie Fritsch, Ulrike Hartung, Knut Holtsträter, Arnold Jacobshagen, Manuela Jahrmärker, Dominic Larue, Marion Linhardt, Katrin Losleben, Stephan Mösch, Ruth Müller-Lindenberg, Gunhild Oberzaucher-Schüller, Thomas Steiert, Susanne Rode-Breymann, Stephanie Schroedter, Mathias Spohr, Susanne Vill, Sebastian Werr, and Saskia Woyke.

== Teaching ==
In cooperation with the professorships of Musicology and Theater Studies, a fully comprehensive study programme is offered by the Department of Music Theatre. At the University of Bayreuth, the degrees Bachelor of Arts "Music Theater Studies", the Master of Arts "Opera & Performance", and the Master of Arts "Music & Performance" can be obtained. Furthermore, a doctorate can be completed in the programme "Music & Performance". In addition, staff of the Institute also participate in the Bachelor of Arts "Theater & Media". The master's programme "Opera and Performance" focuses on opera in contexts related to its performance. It is thus integrated into the field of opera studies, which has been gaining in academic breadth in recent years. The programme examines opera as a performative phenomenon and cultural practice. With its interdisciplinary approach, it focuses on methods from musicology and theatre studies. In a multi-perspective approach, in which aspects of media studies and cultural studies, including gender studies, are also significant, opera can be treated in the various medial states of its transmission. In the master's and doctoral programme "Music & Performance", the interaction of music and performative phenomena is examined from different perspectives. The term "performance", borrowed from English, encompasses both general aspects of performance and performance art in the narrower sense. Thus, the fields of music and theatricality (concerts, street music culture, and pageants as theatrical events), music and audiovisual media (film and television) as well as the interactions of music and visual art are very much in the spotlight. The study programme requires a multi-perspective approach that uses methods and findings from film, theatre, and art and dance studies and develops them independently.

== Research ==
With its events and projects, fimt offers an international discussion forum and mediates between science and practice. As a centre of interdisciplinary research, fimt promotes cooperation with national and international musical theatre institutions. The Institute houses an extensive library as well as an archive of music theatre programmes. The staff of fimt work in an interdisciplinary and cross-faculty manner in the fields of musicology and theatre studies. Furthermore, fimt cooperates with many renowned institutes and cultural institutions: Almaviva e.V. - Alumni- und Förderverein Musiktheater Bayreuth, Concerto Köln, Staatstheater Nürnberg, Landestheater Coburg,, Klaviermanufaktur Steingraeber & Söhne, Bayreuth Academy of Advanced African Studies, Theaterwissenschaftliche Sammlung der Universität Köln (Schloss Wahn), Theater Erfurt, Dramaturgische Gesellschaft AG Musiktheater, Richard Wagner Museum Bayreuth, and Oper Dortmund, Staatstheater Kassel . Current research projects of the Research Institute for Music Theatre include "Staging Power and Entertainment - Propaganda and Music Theatre in Nuremberg 1920-1950", "Wagner Singing in the 21st Century - Historically Informed" and "Music Theatre in Institutional Change between Musealisation and New Formats".

== Publications ==
The series "Thurnauer Schriften zum Musiktheater" has been produced since 1978. Until the 21st volume in 2006, the publication series was published by Laaber Verlag. With the 22nd volume in 2008, the series underwent a conceptual and visual overhaul due to the change of publisher to Königshausen & Neumann. "Thurnauer Schriften" also reflect the broad concept of music theatre that underlies the research and teaching activities of the Institute. Since 2010, the Institute has published the online publication "ACT - Zeitschrift für Musik und Performance". The journal focuses on the fields of music and performance, with each issue pursuing its own focus, which is determined by its revolving editors. "ACT" offers a place for innovative research approaches, especially for young academics. The electronic journal contains articles in German and English and is aimed at an international audience.
