= American Musical Instrument Society =

American organological society

The American Musical Instrument Society (AMIS) was formed in 1971 "to promote study of the history, design, and use of musical instruments in all cultures and from all periods" (the branch of musicology known as organology). Based in the United States, it publishes a journal and a newsletter, holds annual conferences (occasionally in conjunction with the Galpin Society), maintains an active website and e-mail forum, and presents five awards. The society's international membership includes collectors, curators, historians, performers, instrument makers, conservators, restorers, dealers, teachers, and students.

The Journal of the American Musical Instrument Society, (ISSN 0362-3300) published annually, contains three to six articles, generously illustrated, on a wide range of subjects; book reviews; a list of recent publications about musical instruments; and notices and advertisements. Articles published have been reviewed by expert members of the journal's editorial board. Copies of the journal are available in institutional libraries on four continents; its contents may be accessed on ProQuest, an online source. An index to back issues is available at the AMIS website.

The Newsletter of the American Musical Instrument Society, published twice a year, contains official notices and news of the society's activities; short articles, reviews and communications; recent acquisition lists from member institutions; news of members, and classified ads. Current and recent issues are archived on the AMIS web site.

AMIS-L is a Listserv e-mail forum for AMIS members and designated others. It was established following the international joint conference of AMIS, the Galpin Society, and CIMCIM at the National Music Museum in Vermillion, South Dakota, in May 2006, to facilitate continuing informal communications among members.

The Curt Sachs Award, named for a founder of the modern systematic study of musical instruments, is given for lifetime contributions to the goals of the society. The recipient is invited to address members of AMIS at the society's annual meeting. Past recipients of this and other awards are listed on the society's web site. In 2008 William Waterhouse received the award posthumously.

The Nicholas Bessaraboff Prize, named for the scholar who helped lay the foundations of modern organology with his monumental catalog Ancient European Musical Instruments, is awarded for best book-length publication in English. The prize, which includes a sum of $500, was first given in 1989 and was awarded every second year thereafter to 2009, when it became an annual award.

The Frances Densmore Prize, named for the pioneering ethnographer who recorded musical practices of Native Americans on hundreds of wax cylinders and in important books, is awarded for the most significant article-length publication in English. The prize, which includes a sum of $500, was first given in 1988 and was awarded every second year thereafter to 2009, when it became an annual award.

The Frederick Selch Award, named for an important collector of American musical instruments who was a founding member and second president of AMIS, was established in 2004 to honor the best student paper presented at an annual meeting of AMIS. The prize, which includes a sum of $250, is awarded at the discretion of a committee appointed by the AMIS president.

The William E. Gribbon Memorial Award, named for a woodwind collector and longtime AMIS member, was established in 1989 to encourage and enable students to attend the annual meetings of AMIS. The award consists of a student membership in AMIS for one year and substantial financial support for travel and lodging. Applicants must be aged thirty-five years or under, be enrolled as full-time undergraduate or graduate students in accredited academic programs, and have career interests that relate to the purposes of AMIS.

== Bibliography ==
- Carolyn Bryant: "'In the Beginning'—The Early Days of the American Musical Instrument Society," Journal of the American Musical Instrument Society 33 (2007), 162-239
- American Musical Instrument Society: 2008-09 Membership Directory and Handbook
