= Retford family (bow-makers) =

William Charles Retford (1875–1970) and William R. Retford (1899–1960) were English musical instrument bow-makers, working for the firm of W.E. Hill & Sons. Retford is recognized as developing the Hill bow, along with Alfred Hill.

William C. Retford was a perfectionist who became known as the best bow craftsman of his time. He created (and was first to use) the fleur-de-lis design on the best quality gold and tortoiseshell bows. In 1964, William C. Retford wrote "Bows and Bowmakers", which offered a new perspective regarding English bows.

William Richard Retford (1899–1960) trained as a bow maker with his father. Unfortunately William Richard found it difficult to live up to his father's fame. Although he was employed by the Hills, he mainly worked on repairing bows.,

After the death of William C. Retford, his colleagues Mr. Porter and Mr. Yeoman arranged with William R Retford's daughter that all his tools and other material should be donated to the Bate Collection of Musical Instruments in Oxford in his memory. In addition, they and Arthur Bultitude established the nucleus of the Retford Memorial Collection of Bows. The collection includes viol and viola d'amore bows by Edward Dodd.
