= Francis William Galpin =

English cleric and musicologist; known for his collection of musical instruments

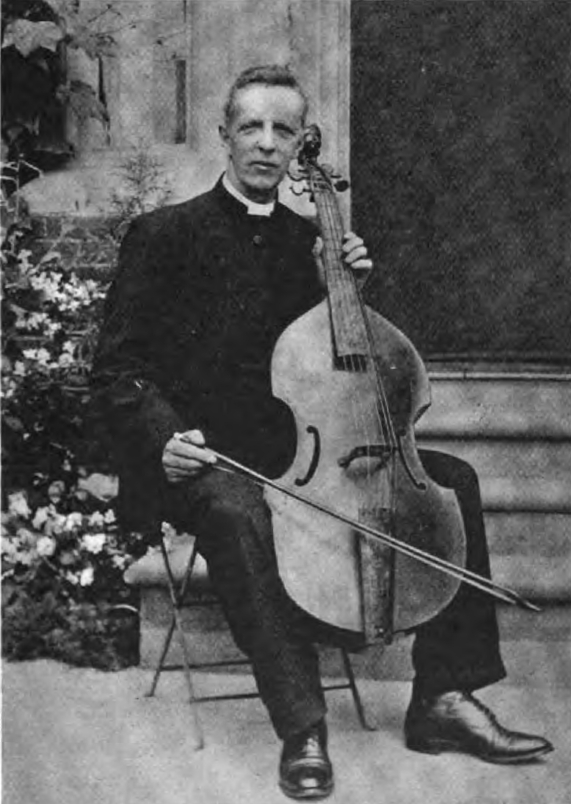
Francis William Galpin, 1906.

Francis William Galpin (25 December 1858 – 30 December 1945) was an English cleric and antiquarian musicologist. He was known as a collector of old musical instruments.

== Life ==
Born in Dorchester, Dorset, Galpin was educated at Sherborne and Trinity College, Cambridge, where he studied organ under Sterndale Bennett. He was ordained in the Church of England in 1883, became as a recent graduate of that year curate at Redenhall with Harleston in Norfolk; and went on to be a curate at St Giles in the Fields, London.

As vicar of Hatfield Regis in Essex during the 1890s, Galpin organised concerts with instruments from his collection, including recorders, lutes and serpents. Subsequently, he was vicar at Witham, and then Faulkbourne. Galpin also served as President of the Essex Archaeological Society.

His students included Geneviève Thibault de Chambure.

In 1946 the Galpin Society was formed to further his work on musical instruments.

== Collection ==
In 1916, Galpin sold his collection of over 500 antique musical instruments to William Lindsey, who donated them to the Museum of Fine Arts, Boston in memory of his daughter Leslie Lindsey Mason.

== Works ==
Galpin wrote:

- Descriptive Catalogue of the European Instruments in the Modern Museum of Art (1902)
- The Musical Instruments of the American Indians (1903)
- Notes on the Roman Hydraulus (1904)
- The Sackbut (1907)
- Old English Instruments of Music (1910)
- A Textbook of European Musical Instruments (1937)
- The Music of the Sumerians, Babylonians and Assyrians (1937)
