= Bate Collection of Historical Musical Instruments =

- Location of the collection in Oxford
- Established: 1968
- Location: St. Aldate's, Oxford, England
- Coordinates: 51.7488°N 1.2562°W
- Type: University museum of musical instruments
- Website: www.bate.ox.ac.uk

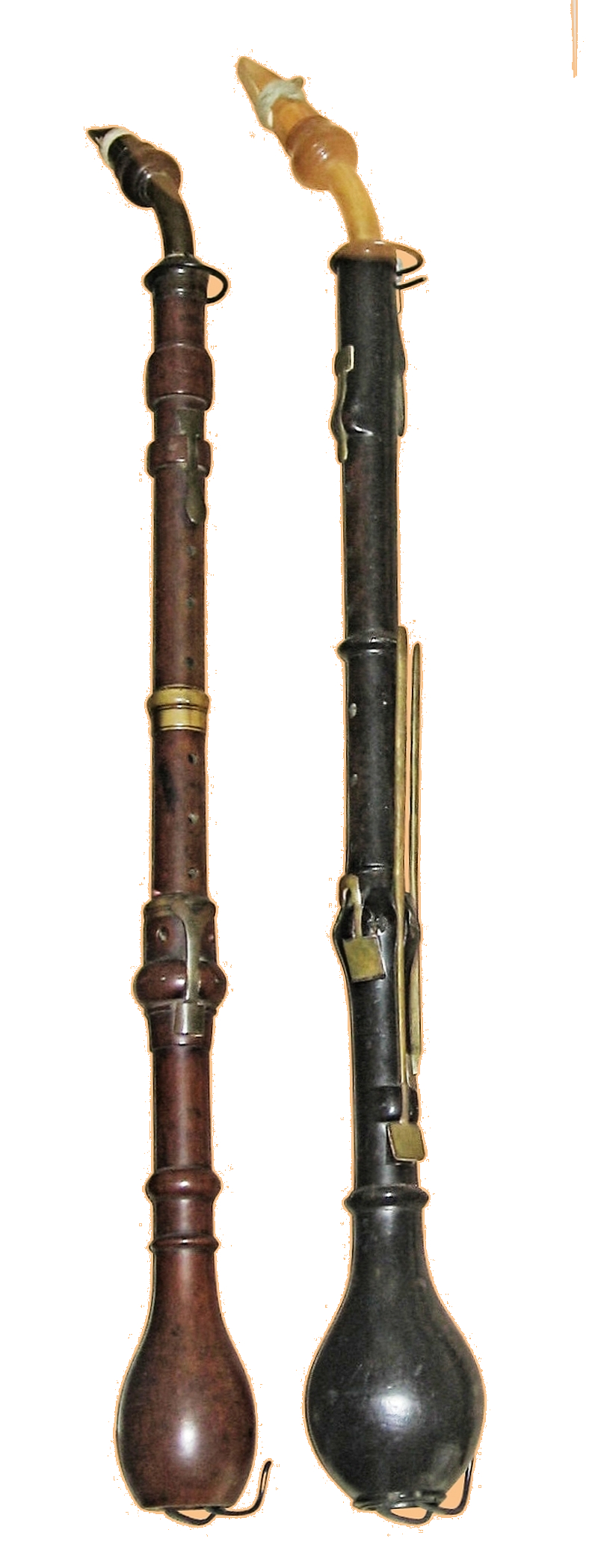
Two clarinettes d'amour in the Bate Collection.

The Bate Collection of Historical Musical Instruments is a museum of musical instruments from the Middle Ages onwards. It was housed in Oxford University's Faculty of Music near Christ Church on St. Aldate's before moving to the newly constructed Schwarzman Centre for the Humanities in 2026, with a new permanent exhibition "Resonant Histories: Material Culture, Sound and Craft" curated by Dr Emanuela Vai (Head of Collections and Curator). The Bate Collection is an accredited museum under the Arts Council England Museum Accreditation Scheme UK and the International Council of Museums (ICOM), International Committee of Museums and Collections of Instruments and Music (CIMCIM).

== Collection ==
The collection is open to the public, staff and students. The collection has three strategic pillars: 1. Conservation - it cares for, develops, and widens access to the collections 2. Research and Teaching- it enables, leads and delivers world-class research and teaching (including MA courses) 3. Audiences: it provides engaging experiences for increasingly diverse audiences.

A large number of instruments by important English, French and German makers, shows the musical and mechanical development of wind and percussion instruments from the Renaissance to the current day.

The Bate Collection is the home of the Reginald Morley-Pegge Memorial Collection of Horns and other Brass and Woodwind Instruments; the Anthony Baines Collection; the Edgar Hunt Collection of Recorders and other instruments; the Jean Henry Collection, the Taphouse Keyboard Loans; the Roger Warner Keyboard Collection; the Michael Thomas Keyboard Collection; a number of instruments from the Jeremy Montagu Collection; a complete workshop of the English bow-maker William C Retford, as well as a small collection of Bows formed in his memory, the Wally Horwood Collection of books and recordings, and other instruments acquired by purchase and gift.

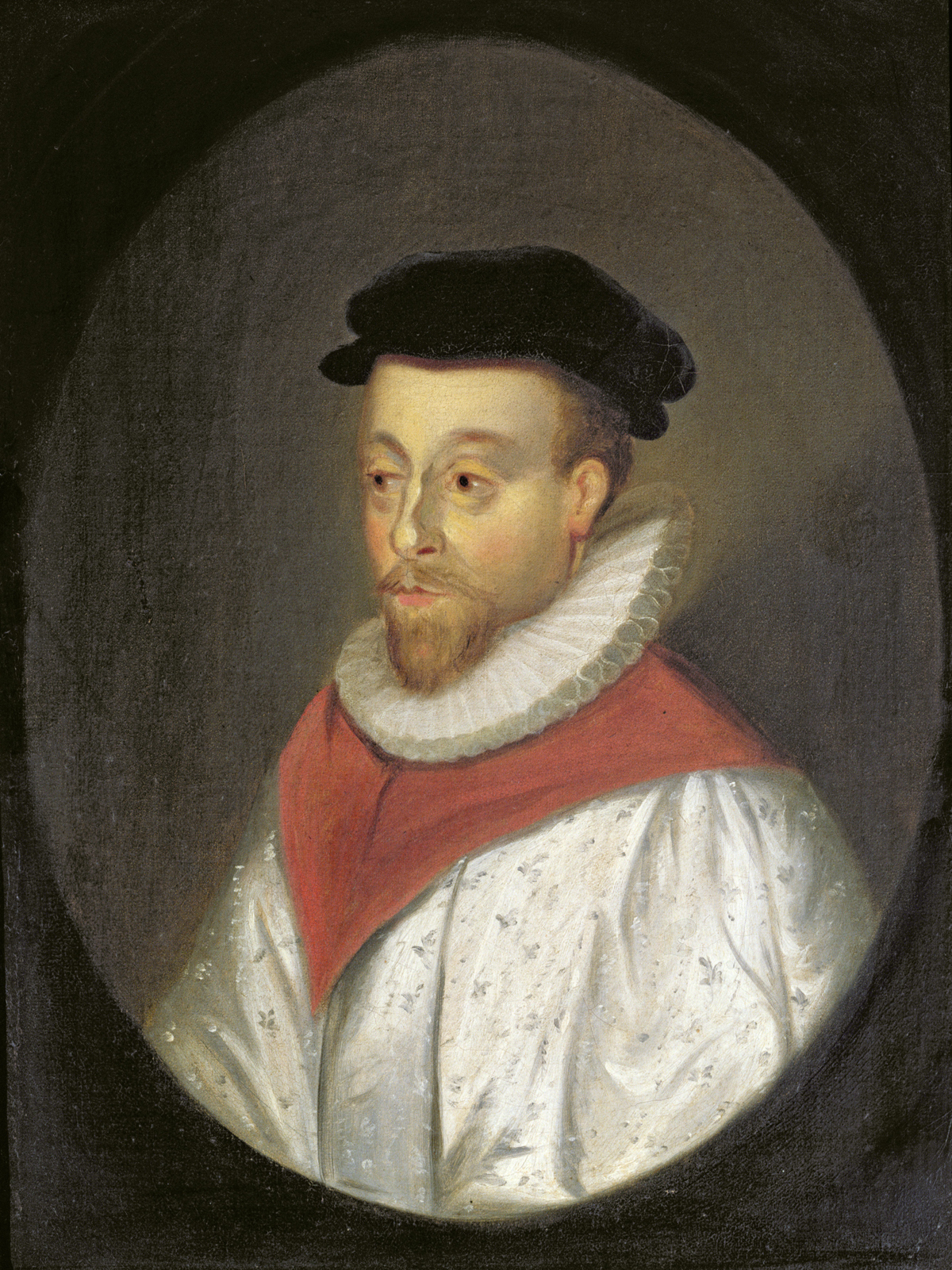
This oil painting of Orlando Gibbons (1583–1625) is presently in the collection.

An album, 'Voices From The Past, Vol. 2: Instruments of The Bate Collection' was released in 2015.

== History ==
The collection is named after Philip Bate who began giving his collection of musical instruments to the University of Oxford in 1963, on the condition that it was used for teaching and was provided with a specialist curator to care for and lecture on it. The collection also houses an archive of his papers.

Bate Collection of Musical Instruments (former and current Curators and Conservators)

Dr Philip Bate; Dr Horace Fitzpatrick; Dr Anthony Baines; Dr Jeremy Montagu; Dr Hélèn La Rue; Mr Andy Lamb; Dr Emanuela Vai currently leads on all conservation, research and curatorial aspects at the Bate Collection of Musical Instruments.

== See also ==
- List of music museums
- Museum of Oxford
