= Baroque trumpet =

Brass instrument

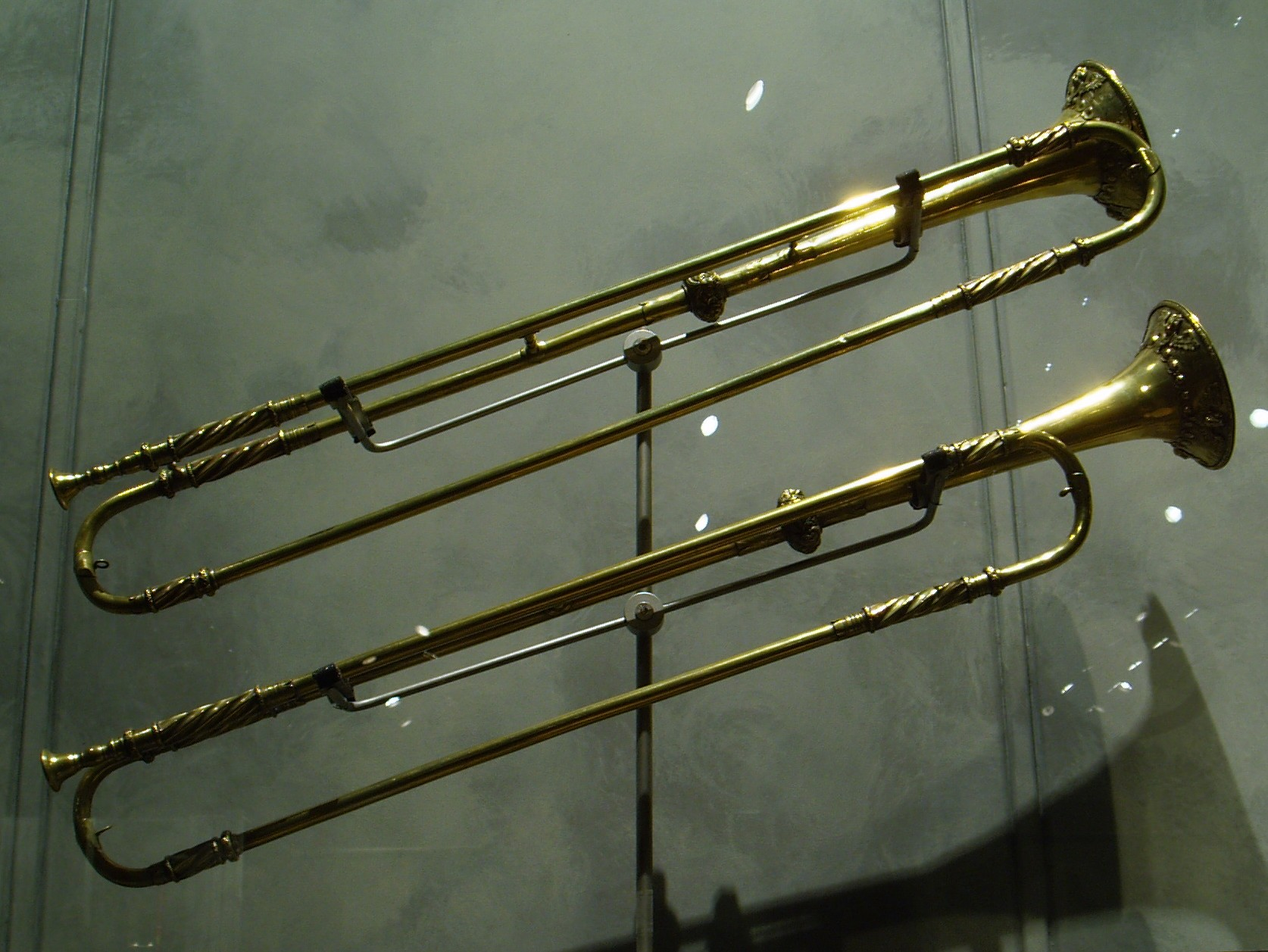

The baroque trumpet is a musical instrument in the brass family. It is designed to allow modern performers to imitate the natural trumpet when playing music of that time, so it is often associated with it. The term 'baroque trumpet' is often used to differentiate an instrument which has added vent holes and other modern compromises, from an original or replica natural trumpet which does not. Notable baroque trumpet players include Alison Balsom, Niklas Eklund, Brian Shaw, and Caleb Hudson.

== History ==
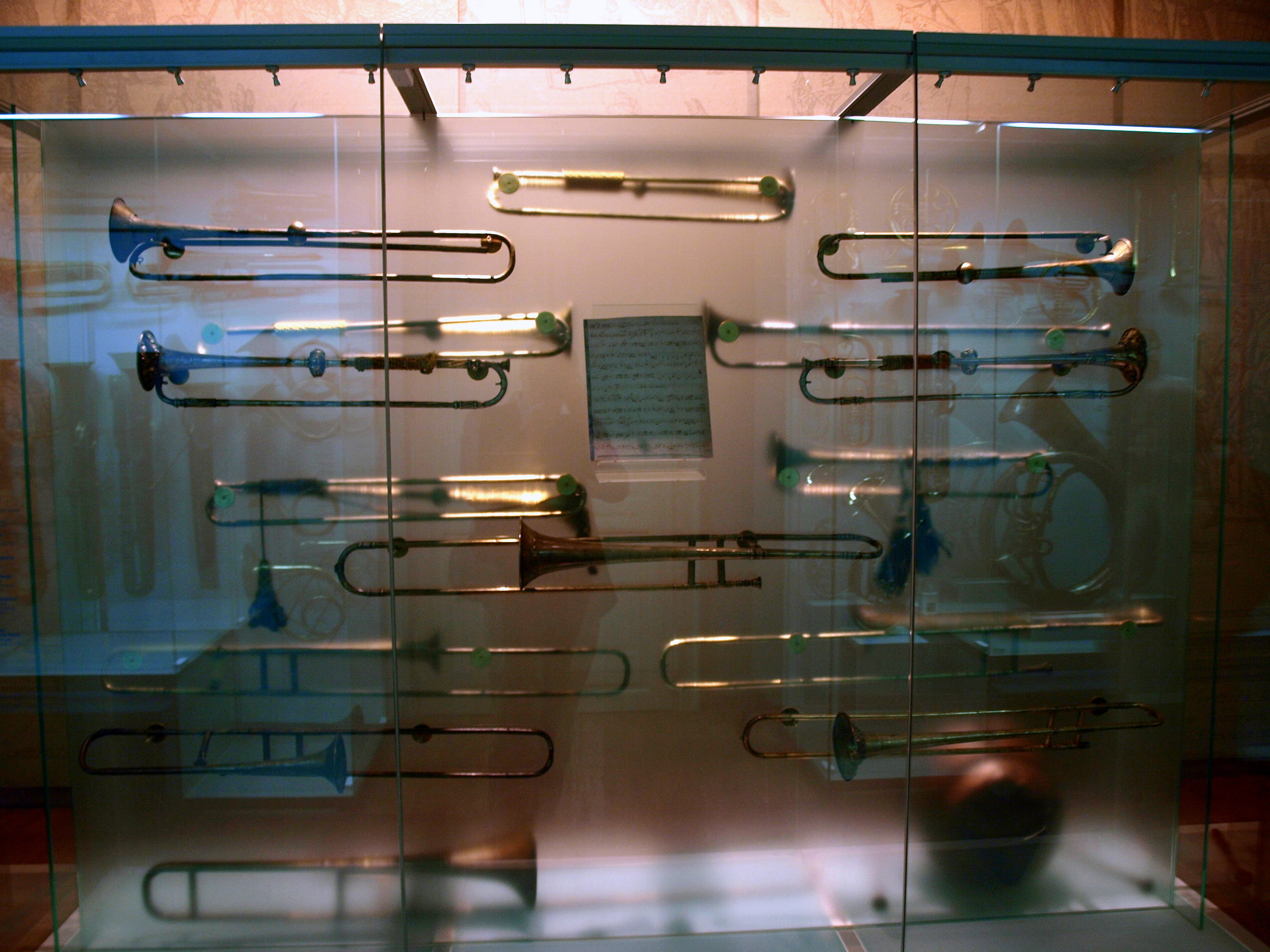
Baroque Trumpets in a museum

The Baroque trumpet, invented in the middle of the 20th century, is based on the natural trumpet of the 16th to 18th centuries. There is little information about solo trumpeters of the 18th century trumpet music, but there is knowledge of the pieces that might have been performed. One such piece is Bach's Second Brandenburg Concerto in F, which is one of the most famous landmark pieces for the baroque trumpet. The trumpet was known for its military purposes, made to give troop signals, particularly in the 30 Years' War. The trumpet is referred to in the Old Testament as instrumental in public safety and military strategy. However, the trumpet goes back further than the 16th century, having found early versions of a natural trumpet in Tutankhamun's tomb, signifying ceremonial significance for the instruments.

== Modern reproductions ==
The term "baroque trumpet" has come to mean a version of the original natural trumpet, with changes to suit modern players, who tend to play both the modern trumpet and this hybrid. The hybrid instrument is most often employed by period instrument ensembles when choosing historically informed performance practice. Originals are seldom used, because they are too valuable.

Some modern performers use natural trumpets unchanged in design since the Baroque era. However, the majority now choose baroque trumpets constructed with vents, which were not used in the Baroque. The use of natural versus baroque trumpets is controversial. In general, however, most professional trumpeters regard the modern baroque trumpet, with at least one vent hole, as a necessary compromise to ensure acceptable intonation and secure attack for players of modern trumpets, while still providing an approximation of the original sound.

=== Tuning ===
The most important reason for using a baroque trumpet is to allow alternative tunings for problematic notes. The harmonic series is mostly "in tune" but there are a few notes which are "off-centre". It is normal for natural trumpet players to lip notes into tune (see natural trumpet), but players moving from the modern trumpet are not accustomed to lipping notes to that extent, which leads them to use the baroque trumpet.

Temperaments of the period centre on just intonation and meantone temperament. The harmonic series of the trumpet requires less lipping for these period temperaments than when playing in the equal temperament that modern players are used to.

The out-of-tune f^{2} and a^{2} (written, relative to a fundamental of C) are usually sounded only briefly in passing. Baroque composers such as Bach and Handel were careful not to ask their trumpeters to "dwell" on the f^{2} and a^{2} for any length of time. The other out-of-tune notes (B♭ in both octaves) are even less frequently used, while the 11th harmonic is closer to an F# and usually played as such. Within the context of meantone temperament, the 11th harmonic is very nearly in tune.

=== Inaccurate harmonics ===
With twice the length of tubing of a modern trumpet, the natural trumpet has harmonics much closer together, meaning that the risk of a performer hitting the wrong harmonic is higher. But also it is almost impossible to hit a harmonic that conflicts with the harmony, and the effect is a direct parallel of an expressive ornament.

Lipping notes into tune increases the chance of a missed note, but the improved acoustics of a trumpet constructed without the need for vents somewhat makes up for the difference.

A common view is that in an era of recordings, conductors usually prefer trumpet players to have accuracy in pitch and tuning rather than the authentic sound, with the result that players use the baroque trumpet, a compromise between the natural trumpet and the modern trumpet.

=== Construction ===
Some baroque trumpets have been made using modern manufacturing methods, not the hand-hammered technique employed by master craftsmen such as Schnitzer, Haas, Hainlein, Ehe, and others. There is evidence, for example, that the bore anomalies of museum originals may favor certain notes, making it possible to "lip" the out-of-tune notes with greater ease. This characteristic is absent in factory-made instruments, with their geometrically perfect bore.

Bore anomalies include (but are not limited to) imperfectly soldered seam tubing and telescoping joints. Each of the five joints — crook or bit to 1st yard; 1st yard to distal bow; distal bow to 2nd yard; 2nd yard to proximal bow; and proximal bow to bell section — represents a "choke-point", the upstream tubing being shrunk to telescope into the expanded downstream ferrule. The slight acoustical perturbations so produced suggest a further eroding of the harmonic series' rigidity, and a consequently greater flexibility is available to the player. As a side note, these joints are a friction fit without the use of solder.

"Acoustically, the introduction of nodal vent holes, which need to be positioned relative to the total length of tubing, necessitates tuning slides (usually made from machine-drawn tubing), separate back bows, "yards" and mouth-pipes for different keys; meaning thicker walls, bows and variations in bore and conicity in the wrong places; needing compensation with a conical lead-pipe, which changes bell acoustics, and so on."

=== Sound ===
The sound of the baroque trumpet is noticeably different from the modern piston trumpet, with a slightly more muted sound. The biggest difference is that it is not quite as loud as a modern trumpet when playing on its own in a regular room, instead intended to be played in cathedrals.

=== Posture ===
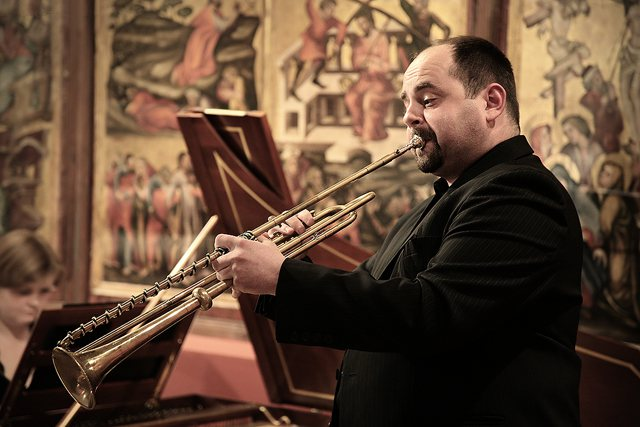

The baroque trumpet is held supported by two hands while pointing downwards. The left hand supports the body of the instrument and the right hand sits over the holes. The back and shoulders should be straight, but not tense, and the posture should be relaxed to allow for open air flow.

=== How it works ===
When opened, the vent hole creates a node, or a position along the vibrating air column, where the pressure variations are at a minimum. This creates a transposition — in the case of a single thumb vent hole, the entire harmonic series of the trumpet is shifted up by a fourth.

== Instruments ==
=== One vent ===
Players in continental Europe most commonly use modern replicas built with one hole, such as with the "Modell Tarr" made by Ewald Meinl Musikinstrumentenbau GmbH of Germany, the hole of which is usually covered by the right thumb. Most of the time, the hole remains covered, allowing the instrument to sound in its original key, whether B♭, C, D, E♭, or F. In order to play the out-of-tune 11th and 13th harmonics (notated f^{2}, and a^{2}), for example, the player opens the thumb vent hole and plays the f^{2} and a^{2} as the 8th and 10th harmonics of the new series.

=== Three or four vents ===
British players tend to prefer baroque trumpets with three or four holes, allowing the player to make half-step transpositions and blow a relatively easy high C.

An example of a multi-hole baroque trumpet is the coiled Jägertrompete made by Helmut Finke, used by the Concentus Musicus Wien on many of their early recordings. However, this model has fallen out of favor with period instrument groups, and is seldom used nowadays.

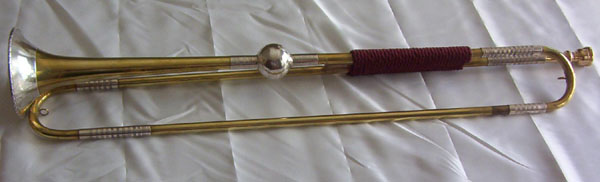
Baroque trumpet, model Johann Leonhard Ehe III, Nürnberg, 1700

== Mouthpieces ==
The mouthpiece plays a role in re-creating an "authentic" performance. A historically accurate baroque trumpet mouthpiece has a shallower cup and a flatter rim than a modern trumpet mouthpiece, and it works better in creating a more historically accurate sound. Many mouthpiece sellers sell modern recreations of historical mouthpieces, and a store titled "The Baroque Trumpet Shop" sells a mouthpiece based on an original historical mouthpiece from the Carolino Augusteum museum in Salzburg.

== See also ==
- Natural trumpet
