= State Institute for Music Research =

Musicological research facility in Berlin, Germany

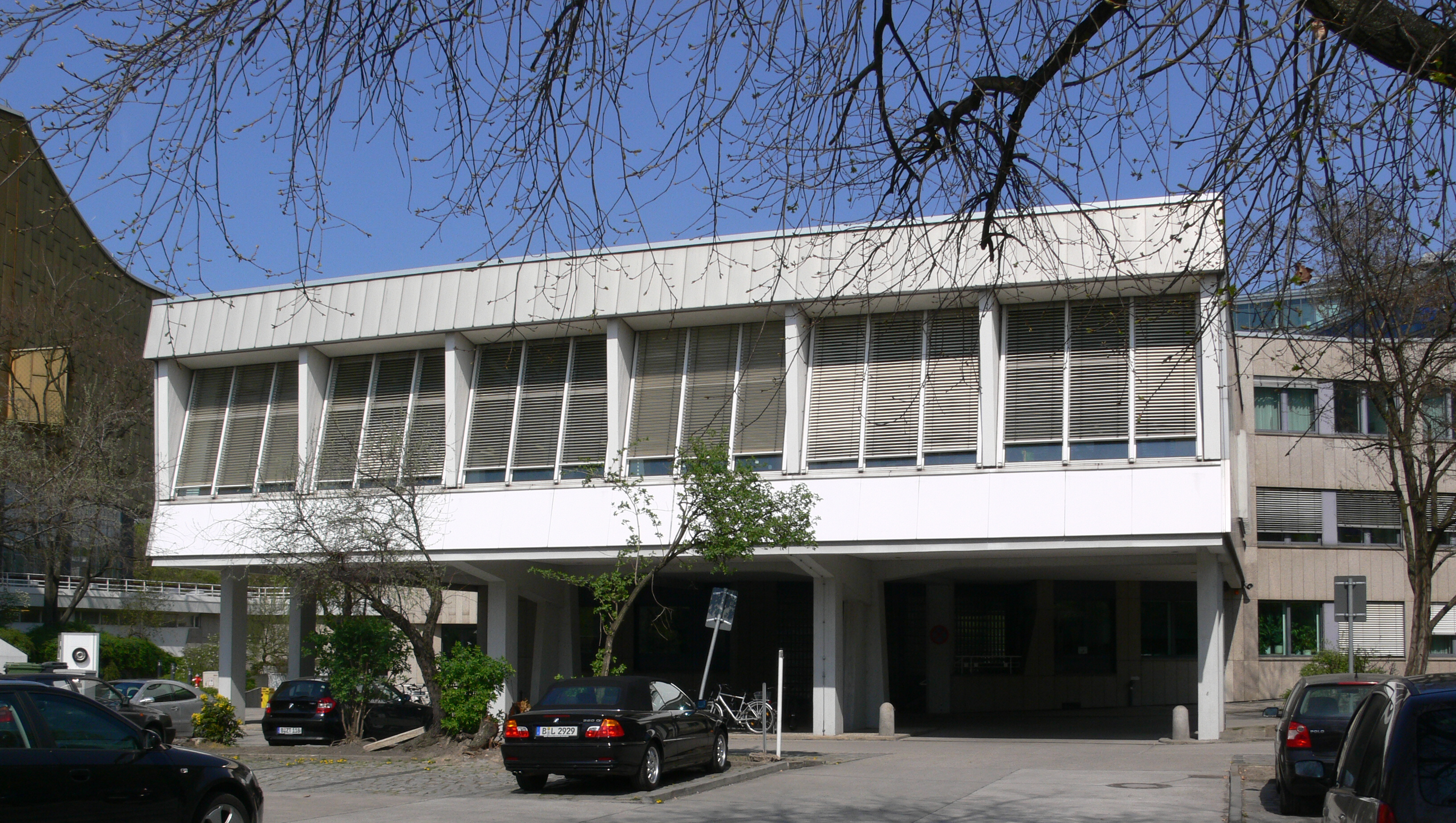
Entrance to the State Institute for Music Research, Berlin

The State Institute for Music Research (German: Staatliches Institut für Musikforschung or SIMPK) is a musicological research facility in Berlin, Germany for the study of Musical Instruments, Music History, Music Theory and Music technology. It is an agency of the Prussian Cultural Heritage Foundation and operates the Berlin Musical Instrument Museum.

== History ==
The current Institute is a direct descendant of several institutions of the former Kingdom of Prussia. In 1888, a formalized collection of ancient musical instruments was established at the Prussian Royal Academy of Music. By 1902, the collection had grown substantially through the financial support of Wilhelm II. In 1919 Curt Sachs, one of the founders of the field of organology (the study of musical instruments), was appointed the first Director of the instrument collection. In 1917, an Institute for Musicological Research was also founded under the patronage of Prince Adolf of Schaumburg-Lippe in Bückeburg.

At the start of the Third Reich in 1933, Sachs was dismissed and forced to emigrate by the Nazi Party. In 1935 a new National Institute for German Music Research was founded in Berlin, led by Max Seiffert, incorporating the old Royal College and the Bückeburg Institute. World War II then saw the nearly complete destruction of the Institute and the Museum. In 1943, the instruments, scores and library collections were evacuated from Berlin to protect them from Allied bombing. Despite extensive security, the majority were lost. In January 1945, "by Decree of the Reich Minister of Science, Education and Culture", the Institute was closed. At war's end, only 700 of the original 4,000 musical instruments survived.

After the war, what remained of the Institute came under the direct control of the West Berlin city government and a painstaking reconstruction began, with a focus on the valuable instruments collection. In 1949 it was given accommodations at Charlottenburg Palace. On the 200th anniversary of Johann Sebastian Bach's death in 1950, the Institute held the first chamber music concert on historic instruments. In 1962 the Institute came under the administration of the newly created Prussian Cultural Heritage Foundation, and the Department for Musical Acoustics was established in 1965 through a grant from the Fritz Thyssen Foundation. A ceremony was held to lay the foundation stone for the Institute's current building in 1979 on the Kulturforum, which opened to the public in 1984.

== Organization ==
=== Division I: Musical Instruments Museum ===
The Berlin Musical Instrument Museum or "MIM" collects instruments from the European art music school from the 16th to the 21st century. It holds about 3,200 instruments, of which 800 can be seen on permanent display. Those that are playable are played regularly. It is one of the most representative collections in Germany in its diversity. The museum also operates a restoration workshop and has its own concert hall with an active program of chamber concerts.

=== Division II: Music Theory and Music History ===
This department conducts large-scale research projects in the fields of Music Theory and Music History from antiquity to the present. It also operates the Institute's library with a special focus on organology and the Second Viennese School. It also manages the German National contribution to the RILM Abstract of Music Literature. Bibliographical work of the Institute is currently organized in the form of interactive database BMS online.

=== Division III: Acoustics and Music technology ===
This Department researches Recording studio technology, services the Institute's Electronic equipment, and manages the full digitization its resources. One major project captures the sounds of the historic musical instruments in the Museum systematically and them develops mathematical models to describe them. Recordings from concerts at the Museum are also part of the tasks of the Department. Digital recording studio space allows it to create high-quality master CDs in-house.
