= Don Smithers =

American musician

Don LeRoy Smithers (born February 17, 1933) is an American music historian and performer on natural trumpet and cornetto. He is a pioneer for the revival of the authentic, uncompromised natural trumpet.

== Biography ==
After studying at Hofstra University, New York University, Columbia University and Merton College, Oxford, where he was awarded a D. Phil. (Ph.D.) in the history of music in 1967, Smithers became associate professor at Syracuse University and, thereafter, Docent for the History of Music and Musical Performance at the Royal Conservatory of The Hague in 1975.

As a music historian, Don Smithers has conducted groundbreaking research on the baroque trumpet, having contributed a number of articles and books on its social and historical contexts, as well as its allegorical role in music from the Renaissance and Baroque. Special interests of his research include the work of J.S. Bach and Bach's parts for brass instruments. He has played a decisive role in the revival of a historically based performance practice employing appropriate playing techniques with historically relevant instruments and mouthpieces.

Besides his main topics of trumpet and Bach research, Smithers has been influential for the rediscovery of many important musical works, amongst them the seventeenth-century trumpet music preserved at the residence of the Bishops of Olomouc in Kroměříž, Czechoslovakia (now the Czech Republic), which include compositions by Biber, Schmelzer and Vejvanovsky. In 1968, during the height of the cold war, he even managed to establish a copy of the whole collection on microfilm, which was deposited in the University Library at Syracuse, New York. More recently, he was also responsible for the filming of the entire musical Mss. in the Schloss archives at Sondershausen, which includes most of the surviving cantatas of Gottfried Heinrich Stölzel.

Following early recordings with ensembles like the New York Pro Musica, Musica Reservata, and the Studio der fruehen Musik, Smithers began to record a number of works for trumpet and cornetto with ensembles in Britain, Italy, West Germany and the former German Democratic Republic. Besides several soloistic recordings on trumpet and cornetto, Smithers took part in the first complete recording project of Bach cantatas with Gustav Leonhardt and Nikolaus Harnoncourt. He was the first to authentically perform and record trumpet parts, like those of cantatas Du sollt Gott, deinen Herren, lieben, BWV 77, and Es reißet euch ein schrecklich Ende, BWV 90, on an uncompromised copy of a Baroque-era natural trumpet and an original 18th-century mouthpiece. His last recording on LP, released in 1980, includes the difficult sonatas of C.H. and H.I.F. Biber and Mozart's Divertimento KV 188.

== Selected bibliography ==
- The Music and History of the Baroque Trumpet before 1721, London, Dent, 1973 (second edition Buren, The Netherlands and Carbondale, USA 1988)
- The trumpets of J.W. Haas: a survey of four generations of Nuremberg brass instrument makers, Galpin Society Journal, xviii, London, 1965
- Music for the Prince-Bishop, Music and Musicians, XVIII, 8 (April), 24-27, 1970
- The Habsburg imperial Trompeter and Heerpaucker privileges of 1653, Galpin Society Journal, xxiv, London, 1971
- Playing the Baroque Trumpet: Research into the history and physics of this largely forgotten instrument is revealing its secrets, enabling modern trumpeters to play it as the musicians of the 17th and 18th centuries did, Scientific American, 254/4, 108-115, 1986
- Gottfried Reiches Ansehen und sein Einfluss auf die Musik Johann Sebastian Bachs, Bach-Jahrbuch 73, 113-150, 1987
- An Interview with Don L. Smithers, ITG Journal 13, no. 2, 1988, 11-20
- A New Look at the Historical, Linguistic and Taxonomic Bases for the Evolution of Lip-blown Instruments from Classical Antiquity until the end of the Middle Ages, Historic Brass Society Journal 1, 3-64, 1989
- Bach, Reiche and the Leipzig Collegia Musica, Historic Brass Society Journal 2, 1-51, 1990
- The Emperors' New Clothes Reappraised; or Bach's Musical Resources Revealed, BACH, The Journal of the Riemenschneider Bach Institute, XXVIII, 1-81, 1997

== Selected discography ==
- A Florentine Festival, Musica Reservata, Morrow & Beckett (Argo ZRG 602, 1968)
- Music for Trumpet and Cornetto (Works by Grossi, Buonamente, Viviani et al.) Argo ZRG 601, 1969
- Baroque Trumpet Anthology, Academy of St. Martin-in-the-Fields (Works by Telemann, Schmelzer, Vejvanovsky et al.), Philips 6500 110, 1970
- Italian Trumpet Music, I Musici (Works by Torelli, Perti et al.), Philips 6500 304, 1971
- Virtuose Trompetenkonzerte aus Barock und Rokoko (Works by Richter, Graupner, Querfurth, Haydn), BASF MPS 25 21778-7, 1973
- Bach's Trumpet, Philips 6500 925, 1975
- Two Centuries of Trumpet (Works by H.I.F. and C.H. Biber, Altenburg, Vejvanovsky, Mozart et al.), 2 record-set, Philips 6769 056, 1980
