= Organology =

Science of musical instruments and their classifications

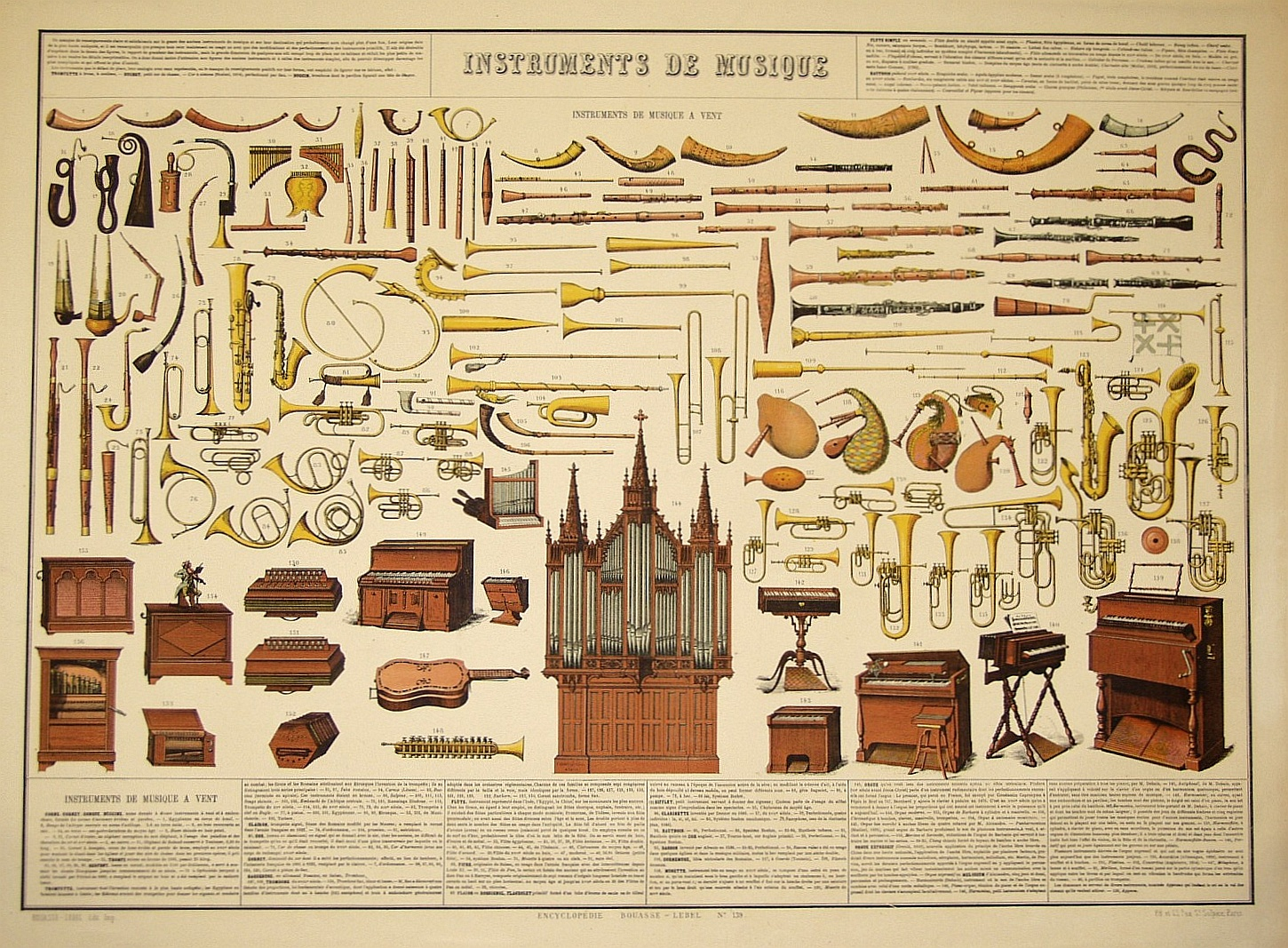
wind instruments

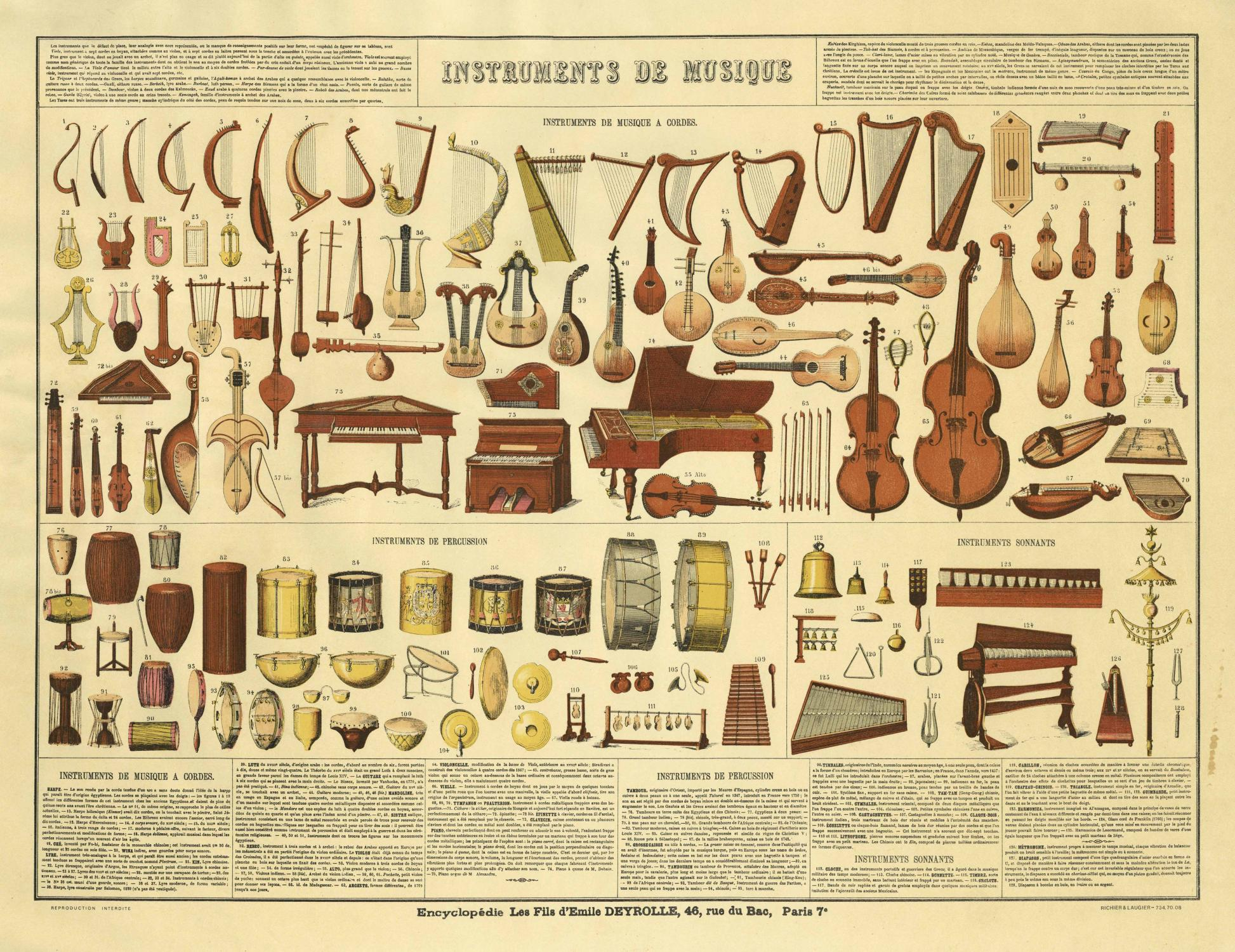
string and percussion instruments

illustrations from a 19th-century encyclopedia with European musical instruments

Organology (/ˌɔːrɡəˈnɒlədʒi/; from Ancient Greek ὄργανον organon 'instrument' and λόγος logos 'the study of') is the science of musical instruments and their classifications. It embraces study of instruments' history, instruments used in different cultures, technical aspects of how instruments produce sound, and musical instrument classification. There is a degree of overlap between organology, ethnomusicology (being subsets of musicology) and the branch of the science of acoustics devoted to musical instruments.

== History ==
A number of ancient cultures left documents detailing the musical instruments used and their role in society; these documents sometimes included a classification system. The first major documents on the subjects from the west, however, date from the 16th century, with works such as Sebastian Virdung's Musica getuscht und ausgezogen (1511), and Martin Agricola's Musica instrumentalis deudsch (1529).

One of the most important organologists of the 17th century is Michael Praetorius. His Syntagma musicum (1618) is one of the most quoted works from that time on the subject, and is the source of much of what we know about renaissance musical instruments. Praetorius's Theatrum instrumentorium (1620) contains possibly the first pictures of African instruments in a European publication.

For much of the 18th and 19th centuries, little work was done on organology. Explorers returned to Europe with instruments from different cultures, however, so that by the end of the 19th century, some musical instrument collections were quite large. This led to a renewed interest in the subject.

One of the most important organologists of the 20th century was Curt Sachs, who, as well as writing Real-Lexicon der Musikinstrumente (1913) and The History of Musical Instruments (1940), devised with Erich von Hornbostel the Hornbostel–Sachs scheme of instrument classification, which was first published in 1914 in the Zeitschrift für Ethnologie. This system classified musical instruments into four distinct categories: idiophones, membranophones, chordophones, and aerophones. This system of classification was updated several times by Sachs and Hornbostel and still continues to be updated periodically. One update to the system was made by Sachs in 1940 through the addition of a 5th category: electrophones, a category encompassing instruments which produce music electronically. Sachs' 1940 book, The History of Musical Instruments, was meant to be a comprehensive compilation of descriptions of instruments from many cultures and their functions within their societies. The book is primarily divided into four chronological periods of instruments: early instruments, antiquity, the middle ages, and the modern occident. These periods are further subdivided into regions and then to significant time periods within those regions. Andre Schaeffner introduced a system based on state-of-matter of the sound-producing mechanism, giving rise to two top-level categories: solid (containing strings and percussion), and gas (containing woodwind and brass). With the invention of the hydraulophone, the physics-based organology has been expanded to use solid, liquid, and gas, wherein the top-level category is the state of matter of the material that makes the sound.

A number of societies exist dedicated to the study of musical instruments. Among the more prominent are the Galpin Society, based in the United Kingdom; the American Musical Instrument Society, based in the United States; and the Gesellschaft der Freunde alter Musikinstrumente, based in Switzerland.

== Outside perspectives on the Hornbostel–Sachs classification system ==
According to one paper written by Henry M. Johnson published by the University of Oxford, “the universally used classification system established by musical instruments of Hornbostel and Sachs has become the paradigm of organology in many cultures”. Additionally, Eliot Bates states in a paper published in the Journal of the Society of Ethnomusicology that “The Hornbostel–Sachs system was not intended to classify the specificity of unique instruments, but rather to highlight commonalities across the world of instruments.”

== Alternative perspectives on the classification of musical instruments ==
Margaret Kartomi, professor and chairperson in the Department of Music at Monash University in Melbourne, approached the topic of musical instrument classification in 1990 with the intention of understanding how musical instruments are classified across cultures. This approach was justified by her observation that the concepts upon which an outside European researcher might classify musical instruments of a particular culture are likely different from the way that those native to the culture choose to classify their musical instruments. Her book emphasizes the complexity that underlies the process of classifying musical instruments, as the classification system is often shaped by “socially influenced or structured ideas or belief systems”.

== Connections to ethnomusicology ==
The 8th edition of UCLA’s publication on Selected Reports in Ethnomusicology published in 1990 was devoted to Issues in Organology. The first paper in the journal written by Sue Carole DeVale entitled “Organizing Organology” attempted to provide a more comprehensive system for defining the study of organology, particularly within the context of ethnomusicology. DeVale defines organology as “the science of sound instruments”. The word choice in this definition is very intentional- DeVale avoids the use of the term “music” or “musical” but rather "sound" because the function of some instruments, such as the Balinese slit drum, serves to signal an event rather than aid in a musical performance. She also defines three primary branches-classificatory, analytical, and applied- that serve as the basis for the study of organology. The classificatory branch essentially encompasses all of the ways in which musical instruments have been categorized, both cross-culturally and through cultural-specific systems. The analytical branch contains the body of work done on analyzing specific aspects of sound instruments and the cultural context/implications of the instruments. The applied branch is the aspects of organology that exist within the realm of museum work that involves the preservation of musical instruments, as well as instrument making. Devale also emphasizes throughout the paper the importance of the connections which exist between the three branches, as it is often essential to consider aspects of organology within all of three branches when doing work or research of any kind within the field. She states that “these branches are independent in theory, but in practice, research and processes conducted with and on instruments and their sounds continuously flow between them and permeate the whole.”

Another notable paper on the topic of the connection between ethnomusicology and organology was written by Henry M. Johnson and published in 1995 in the Journal of the Anthropological Society of Oxford. This paper sought to demonstrate the contribution that the field of ethnomusicology can make to the study of musical instruments. Johnson defines four facets of the connection between ethnomusicology and organology- form, context, performance environment, and the interrelationship between instrument, performer and sound object. These categories were meant to provide a more detailed look at the cultural significance of musical instruments. Johnson states, “Ethnomusicology can… produce a study of the instruments that includes an examination of the interrelationship between the material object, its context and its music, together with an understanding of the meanings connected with each of these areas in specific and general environments (i.e. the contexts in which a sound-producing instrument is played or understood)”.

In 2012, Eliot Bates of Cornell University approached the topic of the ethnomusicological study of musical instruments by focusing specifically on what he terms “the social life of musical instruments”. Bates argues that “‘the social’ has not been adequately studied and theorized because of a paucity of attention given to how social relations are mobilized around material objects and the thing-power that they possess.” Essentially, Bates states that material objects often hold significant social value. It is important to study the object not necessarily for the sake of categorization or understanding the way that it is played or how it works but the meaning that it holds for the musician and the audience.

== Prominent organologists ==
- Ivor Darreg, microtonal instrument builder
- Leo Fender, innovator of several electric guitar constructions (bridges and electronic configurations)
- Bart Hopkin, founder of the magazine Experimental Musical Instruments
- Erich von Hornbostel, co-creator of the Hornbostel–Sachs musical instrument classification system
- Victor-Charles Mahillon, organologist and museum curator
- Bob Moog, inventor of the first synthesizer
- Harry Partch, microtonal string division musical theorist
- Curt Sachs, musicologist and organologist
- Andre Schaeffner
- Leon Theremin
- Anthony Baines, historical organologist and early authority on bagpipes
- William Waterhouse, author of The New Langwill Index, a Dictionary of Musical Wind Instrument Makers and Inventors

=== Ethno-organologists ===
- Adolf Chybinski – Polish organologist
- Hnat Khotkevych – Ukrainian engineer and musicologist.
- Filaret Kolessa – Ukrainian folklorist and ethno-organologist.
- Volodymyr Kushpet – contemporary Ukrainian ethno-organologist
- Klyment Kvitka – Russian and Ukrainian ethno-organologist
- Mykola Lysenko – Ukrainian composer and founder of Ukrainian organology
- Igor Matsiyevsky – Russian and Ukrainian ethno-organologist

== See also ==
- Experimental musical instrument
- Music instrument technology
- New Interfaces for Musical Expression
- Musical instrument classification
