= List of trumpeters =

This article lists notable musicians who have played the trumpet, cornet or flugelhorn.

== Classical players ==
- Bill Adam
- Maurice André
- Ryan Anthony
- Jean Baptiste Arban
- Sir Malcolm Arnold
- Alison Balsom
- Marco Blaauw
- James F. Burke (musician)
- Edward Carroll
- Herbert L. Clarke
- Billy Cooper
- Allan Dean
- Timofei Dokschitzer
- Ole Edvard Antonsen
- Niklas Eklund
- Dennis Ferry
- Merri Franquin
- Thomas Gansch
- Armando Ghitalla
- Harry Glantz
- Claude Gordon
- Ludwig Güttler
- Håkan Hardenberger
- Thomas Harper
- Tine Thing Helseth
- Adolph "Bud" Herseth
- David Hickman
- Matthias Höfs
- Harry James
- Gil Johnson
- Philip Jones
- Frank Kaderabek
- Richard Kelley
- Uwe Köller
- Samuel Krauss
- Marcel LaFosse
- Manny Laureano
- Greg London
- David Longoria
- John MacMurray
- Georges Mager
- Albert Mancini
- Veniamin Margolin
- Wynton Marsalis
- Mauro Maur
- Nathaniel Mayfield
- Malcolm McNab
- Rafael Méndez
- Ennio Morricone
- Maurice Murphy
- Robert Nagel
- Sergei Nakariakov
- Geoffrey Payne
- John Rommel
- Adolf Scherbaum
- Max Schlossberg
- Charles Schlueter
- Daniel Schwarz
- Gerard Schwarz
- Jeffrey Segal
- Alex Sipiagin
- Philip Smith
- Marie Speziale
- Crispian Steele-Perkins
- Thomas Stevens
- Markus Stockhausen
- Gábor Tarkövi
- Edward Tarr
- Guy Touvron
- William Vacchiano
- Tamás Velenczei
- Allen Vizzutti
- René Voisin
- Roger Voisin
- Roger Webster
- Anton Weidinger
- James R. West
- Edna White

== Jazz and commercial players ==
- Greg Adams
- Nat Adderley
- Red Allen
- Herb Alpert
- William "Cat" Anderson
- Louis Armstrong
- Chet Baker
- Kenny Baker
- Kenny Ball
- Guy Barker
- Alexis Baro
- Jakob Bänsch
- Bix Beiderbecke
- Wayne Bergeron
- Bunny Berigan
- Terence Blanchard
- Buddy Bolden
- Jean-Claude Borelly
- Chris Botti
- Lester Bowie
- Cindy Bradley
- Ruby Braff
- Rick Braun
- Randy Brecker
- Till Brönner
- Clifford Brown
- Ray Brown
- Miroslav Bukovsky
- Billy Butterfield
- Donald Byrd
- Eddie Calvert
- John Carisi
- Ian Carr
- Benny Carter
- Bill Catalano
- Roy Caton
- Bill Chase
- Doc Cheatham
- Don Cherry
- Buck Clayton
- Gracie Cole
- Bill Coleman
- Ornette Coleman
- Ken Colyer
- Zach Condon
- Alex Cross
- Ted Curson
- Dick Cuthell
- Wallace Davenport
- Miles Davis
- Kenny Dorham
- Dave Douglas
- Louis Dowdeswell
- Phil Driscoll
- Josh Dun
- Johnny Dunn
- Jon Eardley
- Harry Sweets Edison
- Roy Eldridge
- Don Ellis
- Ziggy Elman
- Howard Evans
- Jon Faddis
- Dominick Farinacci
- Art Farmer
- Maynard Ferguson
- Chuck Findley
- Michael "Flea" Balzary
- Tony Fruscella
- Buzz Gardner
- John Dizzy Gillespie
- George Girard
- Bernie Glow
- Volker Goetze
- Jerry Gonzalez
- Dusko Goykovich
- Conrad Gozzo
- Bobby Hackett
- Tim Hagans
- Roy Hargrove
- Tom Harrell
- Michael Harris
- Jon Hassell
- Thomas Heberer
- El Hefe
- Dana Heitman
- Johnny Helms
- Arve Henriksen
- Al Hirt
- Arnett Howard
- Freddie Hubbard
- Jeff Hughes
- Roger Ingram
- Don Jacoby
- Harry James Angus
- Harry James
- Ingrid Jensen
- Cui Jian
- Bunk Johnson
- Jonah Jones
- Sean Jones
- Thad Jones
- Freddie Keppard
- George Kid Sheik Cola
- Harry Kim
- Mannie Klein
- Scott Klopfenstein
- Takuya Kuroda
- Tommy Ladnier
- Yank Lawson
- Booker Little
- Jens Lindemann
- David Longoria
- Lee Loughnane
- Brian Lynch
- Ibrahim Maalouf
- Chuck Mangione
- Wingy Manone
- Wynton Marsalis
- Hugh Masekela
- Jesse McGuire
- Mickey McMahan
- Rafael Méndez
- Bubber Miley
- Punch Miller
- Blue Mitchell
- Ollie Mitchell
- Lee Morgan
- Ennio Morricone
- James Morrison
- Fats Navarro
- Red Nichols
- Joe "King" Oliver
- Yoshimi P-We
- Kye Palmer
- Nicholas Payton
- Mark Pender
- Marvin Peterson
- Morris Pleasure
- Herb Pomeroy
- Charlie Porter
- Gerard Presencer
- Louis Prima
- Dizzy Reece
- Cynthia Robinson
- Claudio Roditi
- Ack van Rooyen
- Lior Ron
- Wallace Roney
- Rashawn Ross
- Alan Rubin
- Kermit Ruffins
- Chase Sanborn
- Arturo Sandoval
- Manfred Schoof
- Carl Hilding "Doc" Severinsen
- Charlie Shavers
- Woody Shaw
- Bobby Shew
- Jabbo Smith
- Wadada Leo Smith
- Lew Soloff
- Muggsy Spanier
- Terell Stafford
- Marvin Stamm
- Tomasz Stanko
- Colin Steele
- Rex Stewart
- Byron Stripling
- Tony Terran
- Clark Terry
- Charles Tolliver
- Erik Truffaz
- Kid Thomas Valentine
- Allen Vizzutti
- Cuong Vu
- Derek Watkins
- Tavis Werts
- Kenny Wheeler
- Pharez Whitted
- Cootie Williams
- Johnny Zell

== See also ==
- Lists of musicians
