= International Trumpet Guild =

- ITG Small Logo
- Abbreviation: ITG
- Formation: 1975
- Type: INGO
- Legal status: 501(c) (3) NPO
- President: Grant Peters
- Website: www.trumpetguild.org

The International Trumpet Guild (ITG) is an international organization of trumpet players. Members include professional and amateur performers, teachers, students, manufacturers, publishers, and others interested in the trumpet. ITG is a nonprofit, tax-exempt organization supported by the dues of individual members.

== Formation ==
ITG was established in 1975. In 1975, the first ITG Conference was held in Bloomington, Indiana; the following year the Guild met as part of the First International Brass Congress in Montreux, Switzerland. ITG Conferences have been held every year since then, with the Second International Brass Congress being held in 1984 at Indiana University.

In 1982, the ITG Archive was established at Western Michigan University to chronicle the Guild's activities and to preserve historical trumpet-related research. The ITG Research Library serves as a lending library for trumpet-related research.

In 1988, plans were begun to form a larger European component of ITG. In fall, 1990 the Euro-ITG chapter was formed at the Trumpet Days in Bad Sackingen, Germany, with initial membership of 120 members. An International Membership Coordinator was appointed to further develop growth of ITG. The Euro-ITG chapter disbanded in 2003.

== Honorary Award ==
The ITG Honorary Award is given to those individuals who have made extraordinary contributions to the art of trumpet playing. These contributions are through performance, teaching, publishing, research, and/or composition. The tradition has been to award persons only toward the end of their careers, rather than at the beginning or height of their careers.

The ITG Honorary Award does not have to be given every year, and it is possible to award more than one per year.

ITG Honorary Award Winners

- 1987 – Roger Voisin
- 1992 – Maurice André
- 1993 – Louis Armstrong and Armando Ghitalla
- 1995 – Clifford Lillya and Robert Nagel
- 1997 – Philip Jones
- 1998 – Adolph Herseth
- 1999 – Vincent Cichowicz
- 2000 – Edward Tarr
- 2002 – Dizzy Gillespie
- 2003 – Clark Terry
- 2004 – Mel Broiles, Clifford Brown, Miles Davis and Harry Glantz
- 2006 - Philip Smith
- 2007 - Maynard Ferguson and Charles Schlueter
- 2008 - Maurice Murphy
- 2009 - Herb Alpert
- 2010 - Uan Rasey
- 2011 - Roger Delmotte and Susan Slaughter
- 2012 - Fred Mills and Ronald Romm
- 2014 - Gilbert Johnson
- 2015 - Bobby Shew
- 2019 - Ryan Anthony

== Award of Merit ==
The ITG Award of Merit is given to those individuals who have made substantial contributions to the art of trumpet playing through performance, teaching, publishing, research, composition, and/or support of the goals of the International Trumpet Guild.

There is no requirements that the award be given annually, and no restrictions are made as to the number of recipients.

ITG Award of Merit Winners

- 2000 – Gordon Mathie
- 2002 – Charles Colin and Stephen L. Glover
- 2003 – Leonard Candelaria, Ray Crisara and John Haynie
- 2004 – William Adam, D. Kim Dunnick, Frank Kaderabek, and Anatoly Selianin
- 2005 – Anne Hardin, David Hickman, Benjamin Margolin, James Olcott
- 2006 - Joyce Davis, Vincent DiMartino, Charles Gorham, Stephen Jones, Leon Rapier
- 2007 - Richard Burkart, Bengt Eklund, Carole Dawn Reinhart
- 2008 - Stephen Chennette
- 2009 - David Bullock, Gilbert H. Mitchell, Jeffrey Piper
- 2010 - Bryan Goff and Gordon Webb
- 2011 - William Pfund
- 2012 - Keith Johnson and Dennis Schneider
- 2013 - Rob Roy McGregor
- 2014 - David Baldwin, Kevin Eisensmith, Gary Mortenson

== Other awards ==
Prior to 1987, ITG had recognized several trumpet players with awards; these include:

- 1977 - Timofei Dokschitzer
- 1979 – Renold Schilke (Plaque and honorary lifetime membership)
- 1979 – Rafael Méndez (Recognition Plaque)
- 1982 – Doc Severinsen (Recognition Plaque)
- 1983 – Robert King (Recognition Plaque)
- 1984 – William Vacchiano (Recognition Plaque)

== Publications ==
Membership in ITG includes a subscription to all regular publications:

- ITG Journal (4 issues per year, see below)
- Special Supplements to Journals (CDs, music, books)
- Complete Index of Journals (biennial)

ITG has sponsored other publications and reprints:

- The Memoirs of Timofei Dokshizer
- The History of the Trumpet of Bach and Handel by Werner Menke
- Lowrey's International Trumpet Discography by Alvin Lowrey

== Journal ==
The ITG Journal is published quarterly and includes articles on history, performance, literature, recordings, research, pedagogy, physiology, interviews, instrument modifications, and many other trumpet-related areas. The Journal features columns dealing with aspects of trumpet performance and reviews of books, music, and CDs.

== Competitions ==
ITG hosts annual competitions for musicians under 28 including scholarship competitions, solo trumpet, orchestral excerpt, and jazz solo competitions.

In addition ITG sponsors two major trumpet competitions - The Ellsworth Smith International Trumpet Solo Competition which takes place every 4 years, and the Carmine Caruso International Jazz Trumpet Solo Competition, which takes place every 2 years.
