= Rommel (surname) =

Rommel is a German surname. Notable people with the surname include:

- Erwin Rommel (1891–1944), German field marshal of the Second World War
  - Manfred Rommel (1928–2013), mayor of Stuttgart and son of Erwin Rommel
- Adrien Rommel (1914–1963), French fencer
- Eddie Rommel (1897–1970), American baseball pitcher and umpire
- Frank Rommel (born 1984), German skeleton racer
- Henrik Rommel (born 1994), Swedish ice hockey player
- John Rommel (born 1958), American trumpeter
- Julia Rommel, American painter
- Kurt Rommel (1926–2011), German Protestant pastor, author and hymnodist

== See also ==
- Rómmel, Polish surname
- Rommel (disambiguation)
