= Vignal =

Vignal is a surname. Notable people with the surname include:

- Grégory Vignal (born 1981), French footballer
- Marc Vignal (born 1933), French musicologist, writer, and radio producer
- Pierre Vignal (1855–1925), French painter
- René Vignal (1926–2016), French footballer

== See also ==
- Vignale (disambiguation)
