= Albert Mancini =

Albert Mancini (April 23, 1899 – May 13, 1987) was an Italian born American virtuoso trumpeter, violinist, conductor, composer, and arranger. He was the author of numerous arrangements and etudes for the trumpet.

== Life and career ==
The son of Antonio Mancini and Angelina Mancini (née Labriola), Albert Mancini was born in Potenza, Italy on April 23, 1899. He immigrated to the United States as a child; settling initially in Buffalo, New York in 1903. From 1910-1914 was a trumpeter in the National Soldiers Home Band in Johnson City, Tennessee. In 1915 he performed nationally in concerts sponsored by the Chautauqua movement. He was a soldier in the U.S. Army during World War I, and afterwords was a member of the United States Marine Band. On May 3, 1921 he married Frieda Brookhaus in Washington D.C.

Mancini was a trumpeter in the Detroit Symphony Orchestra (DSO) from 1923-1945. The DSO's first trumpeter, he notably was the soloist in the world premiere of Victor Kolar's Canzone della Sera in the orchestra's 1933-1934 season. In 1945 he relocated to Los Angeles where he was a trumpeter in both the Los Angeles Philharmonic and Hollywood Bowl Orchestra from 1945-1965. He also directed several amateur bands in Los Angeles; including those of the local chapters of the American Legion, the Knights Templar, and the Elks.

Mancini was the author of multiple instructional books for trumpet. These included his four volume Virtuoso Method, Trumpet Studies with Modernistic Rhythms, Daily Studies for Trumpet, and Etudes and Caprices for Trumpet in the Modern Manner. He also compiled several published collections of music for either band, orchestra, or solo trumpet. His advanced trumpet etudes are still used in some university-level music programs. His original compositions for band included March of the Champions and U.S. Marines on Parade, and he also arranged the work Italian Polka for band.

Mancini died on May 13, 1987 in Tustin, California.

== See also ==
- List of 20th century brass instrumentalists
- List of trumpeters
- List of violinists
