= Morning Like This =

Studio album by Sandi Patti
- Released: 1986
- Studio: Pinebrook Recording Studios (Alexandria, Indiana); Treasure Isle, Great Circle Sound, Pat Patricks Studio and Bullet Recording (Nashville, Tennessee); Lighthouse Recording Studio (Los Angeles, California)
- Genre: CCM, inspirational music
- Length: 41:41
- Label: Word
- Producer: Greg Nelson, Sandi Patti

Sandi Patti chronology
Hymns Just for You (1985)	Morning Like This (1986)	Make His Praise Glorious (1988)

Professional ratings
Review scores
Source	Rating
AllMusic	4.5/5 stars

Morning Like This is the ninth studio album by Christian/inspirational singer Sandi Patti and her first album on Word Records released in 1986. Morning Like This was considered a successful album and a turning point in her career. It was released in March 1986 and a few months after its release, Patti had reached national acclaim after her rendition of "The Star-Spangled Banner" was included during the ABC Statue of Liberty re-dedication broadcast on July 6, 1986. This exposure led to multiple mainstream television appearances including The Tonight Show and Christmas in Washington. The album was listed at No. 87 from CCM Magazine in their 2001 book CCM Presents: The 100 Greatest Albums in Christian Music. In 1987, Patti won 2 Grammy Awards for Best Gospel Performance, Female and Best Gospel Performance by a Duo or Group with R&B singer Deniece Williams for the track "They Say" from Williams' Gospel album So Glad I Know at the 29th Grammy Awards and later would win 3 GMA Dove Awards for Female Vocalist, Artist of the Year and Inspirational Album of the Year. The track "In The Name Of The Lord" would win a GMA Dove Award for Song of the Year in 1988 given to Patti and her co-writers Gloria Gaither and Phil McHugh. Morning Like This topped the Billboard Top Christian Albums chart, finishing in the Top 3 for three years on their Inspirational Albums year-end charts, including taking the number 1 album of 1987 and was certified Gold in 1987 and Platinum in 1993 by the Recording Industry Association of America.

== Track listing ==
No.	Title	Writer(s)	Length
1.	"Let There Be Praise"	Dick and Melodie Tunney	3:03
2.	"Hosanna" (with guest vocals by 2nd Chapter of Acts)	Billy Smiley, Mark Gersmehl	3:37
3.	"Unshakeable Kingdom"	Bill Gaither, Gloria Gaither, Michael W. Smith	5:48
4.	"Shepherd Of My Heart"	Mark Baldwin, Dick Tunney	4:01
5.	"Love In Any Language"	Jon Mohr, John Mays	4:51
6.	"King Of Glory"	Randall Dennis	2:35
7.	"Face To Faith"	Gary Driskell	4:21
8.	"Was It A Morning Like This"	Jim Croegaert	3:22
9.	"In The Name Of The Lord"	Sandi Patti, Gloria Gaither, Phil McHugh	5:00
10.	"There Is A Savior"	Sandi Patti, Bob Farrell, Greg Nelson	4:42

== Personnel ==
- Sandi Patti – vocals, rhythm arrangements (2, 4–8)
- Bill George – acoustic piano (1)
- Shane Keister – keyboards (2, 4, 5), rhythm arrangements (2)
- Phil Naish – keyboards (2, 4, 5, 6, 8), rhythm arrangements (2, 4–8), synthesizers (7)
- David Huntsinger – acoustic piano (3, 7, 10)
- Steve Millikan – keyboard overdubs (5)
- Jon Goin – guitars (1, 2, 4–8)
- John Darnall – guitars (9, 10)
- Gary Lunn – bass (1)
- Mike Brignardello – bass (2, 4–8)
- Craig Nelson – bass (3, 9, 10)
- Mark Hammond – drums (1, 3, 9)
- Paul Leim – drums (2, 4–8)
- Ronald Vaughn – percussion (1)
- Farrell Morris – percussion (1, 9, 10)
- Pinebrook Brass – brass (1)
- Ernie Collins – brass (3)
- Barry Green – brass (3)
- Chris McDonald – brass (3)
- Rex Peer – brass (3)
- Paul Butcher – brass (3)
- Mike Haynes – brass (3)
- John Rommel – brass (3)
- Don Sheffield – brass (3)
- George Tidwell – brass (3)
- Michael Carrier – brass (3)
- Gilbert Long – brass (3)
- Michael Buckwalter – brass (3, 9)
- Robert Heuer – brass (3, 9)
- Barbara Hutchins – brass (3, 9)
- Tom McAninch – brass (3, 9)
- Eberhard Ramm – brass (3, 9)
- Rick Ricker – brass (3, 9)
- Charles Loper – brass (7)
- Bill Reichenbach Jr. – brass (7)
- Jerry Hey – brass (7), brass arrangements (7)
- Nashville String Machine – strings (1, 3–6, 8, 9, 10)
- David T. Clydesdale – orchestra arrangements and conductor (1, 3, 9, 10)
- Alan Moore – string arrangements and conductor (2, 4, 5, 6, 8)
- Carl Gorodetzky – string leader (1, 3–6, 8, 9, 10)
- Greg Nelson – rhythm arrangements (2, 4–8), string conductor (5)
- Dick Tunney – rhythm arrangements (4)
- 2nd Chapter of Acts – guest vocals (2), vocal arrangements (2)

Backing vocals

- Alan Moore – vocal arrangements (5, 6, 8)
- Cozette Byrd (1)
- Beverly Darnall (1, 3, 9, 10)
- John Darnall (1)
- Steve Green (1)
- Marty McCall (1, 3, 5–10)
- John Mohr (1, 5)
- Ellen Musick (1)
- SandI Patti (1, 3, 5–10)
- Craig Patty (1, 3, 5–10)
- Mike Patty (1, 3, 9, 10)
- Jane Sherberg (1, 5)
- Leah Taylor (1, 3, 9, 10)
- Tammy Boyer (3, 9, 10)
- Rick Gibson (3, 9, 10)
- Lynn Hodges (3, 9, 10)
- Bonnie Keen (3, 5–10)
- David Maddux (3, 5–10), vocal arrangements (7)
- W. Keith Moore (3, 9, 10)
- Jon Sherberg (3, 5, 9)
- Steve Taylor (3, 9, 10)
- Tammy Taylor (3, 9, 10)
- Melodie Tunney (3, 5–9)
- Love In Any Language Choir – choir (5)
- Greg Nelson – vocal contractor (5)

== Production ==
- John Helvering – executive producer
- Greg Nelson – producer
- SandI Patti – producer
- Bob Clark – engineer (1, 3, 9, 10), additional engineer
- Ed Seay – mixing (1, 3, 9, 10), chief engineer (2, 4, 5, 7, 8), engineer (3, 6, 9, 10)
- John Bolt – additional engineer, mixing (6)
- Bill Heath – additional engineer
- Steve Hodge – additional engineer
- Kent Madison – additional engineer
- Tom Harding – assistant engineer
- David Murphy – assistant engineer
- MasterMix (Nashville, Tennessee) – mastering location
- Cindy Wilt – production assistant
- Dennis hill – art direction, design
- Mike Borum – photography
- Mark Johnson – photography

== Charts ==
Chart (1986)	Peak position
US Top Inspirational Albums	1

=== Year-end charts ===
Year	Chart	Position
1986	U.S. Billboard Inspirational Albums	3
1987	U.S. Billboard Inspirational Albums	1
1988	U.S. Billboard Inspirational Albums	3

=== Radio singles ===
Year	Singles	Peak positions	
Year	Singles	CCM AC	CCM CHR
1986	"Was It A Morning Like This"	1	4
1986	"Let There Be Praise"	7	9
1986	"Love In Any Language"	27	11
1986	"In The Name of the Lord"	2	-
1987	"Hosanna"	10	-

== Certifications and sales ==
Region	Certification	Certified units/sales
United States (RIAA)	Platinum	1,000,000^{^}
^{^} Shipments figures based on certification alone.

== Accolades ==
Grammy Awards

Year	Winner	Category
1987	Morning Like This	Best Gospel Performance, Female
1987	"They Say" (with Deniece Williams)	Best Gospel Performance by a Duo or Group

GMA Dove Awards

- 1987, 1988 Female Vocalist of the Year
- 1987 Artist of the Year

Year	Winner	Category
1987	Morning Like This	Inspirational Album of the Year
1988	"In The Name Of The Lord" (co-written with Gloria Gaither and Phil McHugh)	Song of the Year
