= Roger Delmotte =

French classical trumpeter

Roger Delmotte (born 20 September 1925) is a French classical trumpeter.

== Life ==
Born in Roubaix, Delmotte first played the flugelhorn, a wind instrument, in a French wind musical ensemble. After his first studies with Maurice Leclercq at the Roubaix Conservatory, he was awarded the Prix d'honneur in 1944. He continued his studies in 1944 at the Conservatoire de Paris with Eugène Foveau. He won the First Prize for trumpet in 1946 and was the first trumpeter to win the First Prize at the Geneva International Music Competition in 1950.

He held the principal trumpet console of the Paris Opera from 1950 to 1985.

Delmotte was solo trumpet with many orchestras (France, Germany, Austria, Japan, Yugoslavia), trumpet teacher at the Versailles Conservatory until 1994, professor of trumpet at the Paris Conservatory, assistant to Raymond Sabarich, then professor from 1966. He has also been professor of trumpet at the Lausanne Conservatory in Switzerland, director of the Toulon International Wind Instruments Competition for 25 years. With Pierre Cochereau, titular organist of Notre-Dame de Paris cathedral, he created the Duo "Orgue et Trompette" in 1968, and played with him in many countries. He participated in Pierre Cochereau's Summer Tours, which introduced the organ to an even wider audience, with his portable 14-piece instrument with which he travelled and gave recitals.

He has been awarded the honorary prize of the International Trumpet Guild on 28 May 2011 at Minneapolis and the Grand Prix du Disque.

== Bibliography ==
- Michel Laplace, Maîtres du XXe : Roger Delmotte, ITG Journal vol. 8, No.4 (1984).

== Awards ==
- Chevalier of the Légion d'honneur
- Ordre National du Mérite
- Ordre des Arts et des Lettres
