= Romm =

Romm or Romme may refer to:

== Surnames ==
Romm

- Giora Romm (1945–2023), Israeli Air Force general
- Joseph J. Romm (1960–2026), American author, blogger, physicist and climate expert
- Mikhail Romm (1891–1967), Soviet football player
- Mikhail Romm (1901–1971), Soviet film director
- Nic Romm (born 1974), German actor
- Oskar Romm (1919–1993), German Luftwaffe ace
- Robin Romm, American writer

Romme

- Georges Romme (born 1960), Dutch organizational theorist
- Gianni Romme (born 1973), Dutch long-distance runner and speed skater
- Gilbert Romme (1750–1795), French politician and mathematician
- Marius Romme (born 1934), Dutch psychiatrist

== Other ==
- Rommé, the most popular form of the card game, Rummy, in Germany and Austria

== See also ==
- Romm publishing house
- Rommel (disambiguation)
