= Speziale (disambiguation) =

Speziale may refer to:

== People ==
- Charles Speziale (1948 – 1999), American Aerospace engineer
- Jerry Speziale (born c. 1959), American law enforcement officer
- John A. Speziale (1922–2005), justice of the Connecticut Supreme Court
- Marie Speziale (born c. 1945), American musician

== Artistic works ==
- Lo speziale, an opera buffa by Joseph Haydn

== Places ==
- Speziale, a village in Italy
