= Make His Praise Glorious =

Studio album by Sandi Patti
- Released: 1988
- Studio: Audio Media Recorders, Nashville, Tennessee; Great Circle Sound, Nashville, Tennessee; Pinebrook Recording Studio, Alexandria, Indiana; Westlake, Los Angeles, California
- Genre: CCM, inspirational music
- Length: 45:12
- Label: Word
- Producer: Greg Nelson, Sandi Patti

Sandi Patti chronology
Morning Like This (1986)	Make His Praise Glorious (1988)	Sandi Patti and the Friendship Company (1989)

Professional ratings
Review scores
Source	Rating
AllMusic	4/5 stars

Make His Praise Glorious is the tenth studio album by Christian singer Sandi Patti, released in 1988 on Word Records. The track "Almighty God" was nominated for a Grammy for Best Gospel Performance, Female and would win Patti three GMA Dove Awards for Female Vocalist, Inspirational Album and Inspirational Recorded Song of the Year (for "In Heaven's Eyes") at the 20th GMA Dove Awards in 1989. Make His Praise Glorious topped the Billboard Top Christian Albums chart and it was certified Gold by the Recording Industry Association of America.

== Track listing ==
No.	Title	Writer(s)	Length
1.	"Make His Praise Glorious"	Bill & Robin Wolaver	4:24
2.	"Come Let's Worship Him"	Eddie Carswell, Oliver Wells	4:16
3.	"No Other Name"	Gary McSpadden, Billy Smiley, Chris Christian	5:20
4.	"Almighty God"	Greg Nelson, Phil Mchugh	3:35
5.	"Love Will Be Our Home"	Steven Curtis Chapman	4:40
6.	"Come Before Him"	Dick and Melodie Tunney	3:16
7.	"Someone Up There Loves Me"	Steve Wenger	3:41
8.	"In Majesty He Will Come/Majesty"	Dick and Melodie Tunney/Jack W. Hayford	5:55
9.	"In Heaven's Eyes"	Phil McHugh	5:02
10.	"In His Presence"	Dick and Melodie Tunney	4:50

== Personnel ==
- Sandi Patti – vocals, rhythm arrangements (1, 2, 5, 7, 9)
- David Huntsinger – acoustic piano, rhythm arrangements (5)
- Phil Naish – keyboards, rhythm arrangements (1, 2, 4, 7, 9)
- Steve Schaffer – Synclavier operator (1, 2, 4)
- Steve Millikan – additional keyboard overdubs (9)
- Jon Goin – guitars (1–7, 9, 10)
- Rex Thomas – additional guitar overdubs (5)
- Mark Baldwin – guitars (8)
- Nathan East – bass (1, 2, 4, 5, 7, 9)
- Craig Nelson – bass (3, 6, 8, 10)
- Paul Leim – drums (1, 2, 4, 5, 7, 9)
- Mark Hammond – drums (3, 6, 8, 10)
- Sam Bacco – percussion
- Farrell Morris – percussion
- Dan Higgins – horns (7)
- Kim Hutchcroft – horns (7)
- Gary Grant – horns (7)
- Jerry Hey – horns (7), horn arrangements (7)
- Mary Alice Hopefinger – harp (1–6, 8, 9, 10)
- The Nashville String Machine – strings (1–6, 8, 9, 10)
- Carl Gorodetzky – string leader (1–6, 8, 9, 10)
- Greg Nelson – rhythm arrangements (1, 2, 4, 5, 7, 9)
- David T. Clydesdale – orchestrations and conductor (1, 3, 6, 8, 10), arrangements (3, 6, 8, 10)
- Alan Moore – string arrangements (2, 4, 5, 9)

Brass and Woodwinds

- Virginia Lee Carroll, Cynthia Estill, Pat Gunter, Ann Richards, Buddy Skipper and Bobby Taylor – woodwind section
- Ernie Collins, Dennis Good, Barry Green, Chris McDonald, Gary Armstrong, Jeff Bailey, Paul Butcher, Mike Haynes, John Rommel, George Tidwell, Ralph Childs, Michael Buckwalter, Robert Heuer, Barbara Hutchins, Tom McAninch, Eberhard Ramm and Rick Ricker – brass section

Backing vocals

- David T. Clydesdale – arrangements (1)
- Alan Moore – arrangements (2, 4, 5, 9)
- David Maddux – arrangements (7)
- Corliss Nelson – vocal conductor (1, 3, 6)
- Beverly Darnall – vocal contractor (1, 3, 6)
- Cozette Byrd – vocal contractor (8)

Singers

- Mary Bates (1, 3, 6)
- Sheldon "Butch" Curry (1, 3, 6)
- Beverly Darnall (1, 3, 6, 8)
- John Darnall (1, 3, 6, 8)
- Bobby James (1, 3, 6)
- Tammy Jensen (1, 3, 6)
- Bonnie Keen (1, 2, 3, 5–7)
- David Maddux (1, 2, 3, 5–7)
- Marty McCall (1, 2, 3, 5–7)
- Ellen Musick (1, 3, 6)
- Gary Musick (1, 3, 6)
- Guy Penrod (1, 3, 6)
- Gary Robinson (1, 3, 6, 8)
- Leah Taylor (1, 3, 6, 8)
- Melodie Tunney (1, 2, 3, 5–7)
- Lizbeth Wendt (1, 3, 6)
- Gary Janney (2, 5, 7)
- Sandi Patti (2, 5, 7, 8)
- Tammy Boyer (8)
- Shelley Harris (8)
- Leah Helvering (8)
- Brent Henderson (8)
- Greg McCaw (8)
- Don Peslis (8)
- Steve Taylor (8)

== Production ==
- John Helvering – executive producer
- Greg Nelson – producer
- Sandi Patti – producer
- Ed Seay – engineer
- John Bolt – additional engineer
- Bob Clark – additional engineer
- Kevin Clark – additional engineer
- Joe Neil – additional engineer
- Jim Scheffler – additional engineer
- Mark Aspinall – assistant engineer
- David Murphy – assistant engineer
- Mike Poole – assistant engineer
- Georgetown Masters (Nashville, Tennessee) – mastering location
- Cindy Wilt – production manager
- Brian Jannsen – production assistant
- Amy Yahnig – production assistant
- Camille Engel Advertising – art direction, design
- Rich Voorhees – photography

== Charts ==
Chart (1988)	Peak position
US Top Contemporary Christian Albums	1

=== Radio singles ===
Year	Singles	Peak positions	
Year	Singles	CCM AC	CCM CHR
1988	"Make His Praise Glorious"	1	6
1988	"Love Will Be Our Home"	5	-
1988	"In Heaven's Eyes"	6	-

== Certifications and sales ==
Region	Certification	Certified units/sales
United States (RIAA)	Gold	500,000^{^}
^{^} Shipments figures based on certification alone.

== Accolades ==
GMA Dove Awards

- 1989 Female Vocalist of the Year

Year	Winner	Category
1989	Make His Praise Glorious	Inspirational Album of the Year
1989	"In Heaven's Eyes" (written by Phil McHugh)	Inspirational Recorded Song of the Year
