= Merri Franquin =

French musician and professor

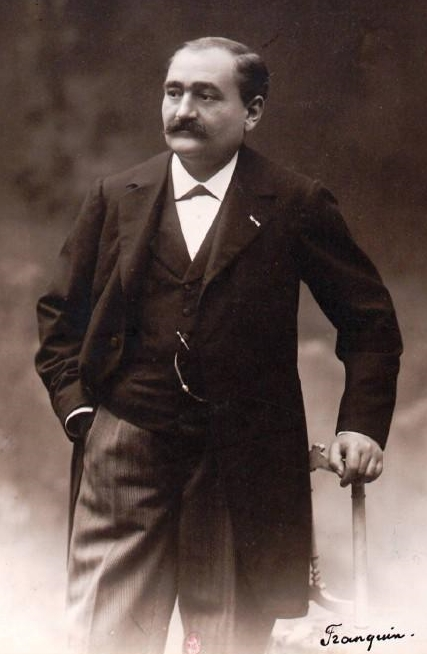
Merri Franquin, c. 1900

Merri Jean Baptiste Franquin (19 October 1848 in Lançon-Provence, Bouches-du-Rhône – 1934 in Paris) was a French trumpeter, cornetist, and flugelhornist who was professor of trumpet at the Conservatoire de Paris from 1894 until 1925. Franquin was a teacher of Eugène Foveau (1886–1957) who became professor of cornet at the Paris Conservatory in 1925. Georges Mager (1885–1950), who was principal trumpet of the Boston Symphony Orchestra from 1919 until 1950, studied in the cornet class under Joseph Mellet, but seems to have been influenced as well by the teachings of Franquin; Mager may have studied with him informally and certainly worked with several of his successful students. Franquin's collaboration with Romanian composer Georges Enescu (1881–1955) led to the composition in 1906 of Légende, one of the great twentieth-century works for solo trumpet and piano. Franquin's book, Methode Complète de la Trompette Moderne de Cornet a Pistons et de Bugle, has been an influential teaching aid for many trumpet players, notably Maurice André. Franquin's most notable accomplishment while at the Paris Conservatory was his push for the C Trumpet to replace the low F trumpet as a more versatile orchestral instrument. A more modern form of this instrument was introduced to American symphony orchestras by Georges Mager, and it remains very much in popular use in the United States.

Merri Franquin was born 1848 in the small Bouches-du-Rhône town of Lançon in southern France. He was self-taught on cornet for four years before moving to Marseille. There he played cornet in the Marseille Casino Musical and later as soloist at the Palais Lyrique and the Théâtre Chave. In 1870 he became solo flugelhornist with the band of the Marseille Garde National, and in 1872 he was admitted to the Paris Conservatory where he joined the cornet class of the famous cornetist Jean-Baptiste Arban.

Franquin's playing career began when he was 28 years old. He was first soloist at the Concerts Pasdeloup from 1876 until 1892, solo trumpet at the Concerts Colonne from 1884 until 1892, first solo trumpet at the Théâtre National de l'Opéra from 1880 until 1901, and solo trumpet of the Orchestre de la Société des Concerts du Conservatoire from 1892 until 1901.
