= John MacMurray (disambiguation) =

John MacMurray (1958–2006) was a Canadian musician.

John MacMurray or John Macmurray may also refer to:

- John Van Antwerp MacMurray (1881–1960), American attorney and diplomat
- John Macmurray (1891–1976), Scottish philosopher

== See also ==
- Webb Wilder, American musician, born John Webb McMurry
