= Roderick Macdonald =

Roderick Macdonald may refer to:

- Roderick MacDonald (musician), principal trumpet of the Leipzig Gewandhaus Orchestra
- Roderick Macdonald, Lord Uist (born 1951), Scottish judge
- Roddy MacDonald (pipe major) (Roderick S. MacDonald, born 1956), Scottish pipe major and music composer previously based in Australia
- Roderick Macdonald (politician) (1840–1894), British member of parliament for Ross and Cromarty, 1885–1892
- Roderick A. Macdonald (1948–2014), Canadian legal scholar
- Roderick Charles MacDonald (1885–1978), merchant and politician in British Columbia, Canada
- Roderick Macdonald (Royal Navy officer) (1921–2001), Royal Navy admiral
- Roderick Lewis Macdonald (born 1957), Scottish Labour politician, member of the Scottish Parliament (MSP) for North East Scotland 2011–2021

== See also ==
- Rod MacDonald (born 1948), American singer-songwriter, novelist, and educator
- Roderick McDonald (died 1885), Canadian physician and politician
- Roderick McDonald (basketball) (1945–2015), American basketball player
