= Veniamin Margolin =

- Born: Veniamin Savelyevich Margolin; 12 January 1922; Petrograd, USSR
- Origin: Russia
- Died: 19 March 2009 (aged 87) Saint Petersburg, Russia
- Genres: Classical music
- Occupations: Musician, music teacher
- Instrument: Trumpet
- Years active: 1944–1974
- Formerly of: Saint Petersburg Philharmonic Orchestra

Veniamin Savelyevich Margolin (Russian: Вениамин Савельевич Марголин, 12 January 1922, Petrograd – 19 March 2009, Saint Petersburg) was a Soviet Russian classical trumpeter and music teacher. He was the principal trumpeter at the Leningrad Philharmonic Orchestra and professor of trumpet at the Saint Petersburg Conservatory.

Veniamin Margolin started to play the trumpet at the age of 11 years. From 1944 to 1947 he played at the Kirov Orchestra (nowadays it is known as Mariinsky Orchestra) despite not having higher musical education at that time. In 1952 he graduated from the Saint Petersburg Conservatory, where he studied with professors Alexander Schmidt and Mikhail Vetrov. In 1947 Margolin became a trumpeter of the Leningrad Philharmonic Orchestra under Yevgeny Mravinsky. He was an important part of the classic era of Leningrad Philharmonic of the Fifties, Sixties and the Seventies as well as some other renowned brass soloists: horn player Vitaly Buyanovsky, trombonist Akim Kozlov, etc. Since 1988 until his death he was a professor of trumpet at the Saint Petersburg Conservatory. Margolin was also an amateur poet. Several books of his lyrics have been published. Veniamin Margolin died on 19 March 2009 at the age of 87. He was buried at the Smolensky Cemetery in St. Petersburg.
