= Eugène Foveau =

French trumpeter and cornetist

Eugène Foveau (26 November 1886 – 5 January 1957) was a French trumpeter and cornetist. He was professor of trumpet at the Conservatoire de Paris from 1925 to 1947.

== Life ==
Born in Dijon, Foveau is a former student of Merri Franquin at the Conservatoire de Paris. In 1907, he won a First Prize for trumpet. In 1925, he succeeded Alexandre Petit in his cornet class. In 1945 he took over the direction of a trumpet class. Marcel Caens, Robert Pichaureau, (in French) Pierre Pollin, Pierre Thibaud, Raymond Sabarich and Roger Delmotte were some among his many students.

Foveau died in Paris at age 70.
