= André Lafosse =

André Lafosse (1890–1975) was a professional trombonist and professor at the Conservatoire de Paris in the early 20th century.

== Life ==
Lafosse was Professor of Trombone at the Conservatoire de Paris from 1948 to 1960, where he took over from Henri Couillaud.

He was also the brother of Marcel LaFosse (1895–1969) who played second trumpet with the Boston Symphony Orchestra from 1928 until the mid-1950s.

He wrote a book entitled Méthode complète pour le trombone in three volumes published in 1921 (first two volumes) and 1946 (third volume). In it he famously describes the practise of playing with vibrato as vulgar and glissandos of questionable taste. It also should be apparent that the French trombones of the period could not play the fifth partial D in tune in the closed slide position (1st) so 4th position is used more frequently. There are just three pages of an appendix to cover the bass trombone.

He also composed a piece for brass quintet with drums, entitled "Suite Brève". The Suite Brève is available on indésens Records (France) on physical CD (2008) as well as downloading on

In the 1920s and 1930s he recorded in orchestras with Stravinsky. It has been suggested that he was the soloist in Stravinsky's own 1928 Paris recording of Pulcinella where the trombonist omits the written glissandos – instead playing the notes staccato. Stravinsky's Octet for winds recorded in the same period features trombonists André Lafosse and a certain Raphaël Delbos.
