= Marcel LaFosse =

French musician

Marcel LaFosse (1894– September 10, 1968) was a French musician and trumpeter with the Boston Symphony Orchestra. He studied at the Conservatoire de Paris with Alexandre Petit, and was first Accésit in the Conservatory Prix in 1911. Petit wrote for him the last of the 12 Grandes Études. Conductor Sergei Koussevitzky brought LaFosse to the Boston Symphony as second trumpet in 1926. He and his colleague Georges Mager (principal trumpet from 1919 until 1950) were both teachers of well-known trumpeters Roger Voisin, who became principal trumpet with the Boston Symphony Orchestra in 1950, and Adolph Herseth, who was principal trumpet with the Chicago Symphony Orchestra from 1948 until 2001. LaFosse was also teacher to his nephew, André Come who played trumpet with the Boston Symphony from 1957 until 1987.

Marcel LaFosse was the brother of André Lafosse, who was trombone teacher at the Conservatoire de Paris, and the author of many pedagogical works.
