= William P. Perry =

American composer and television producer

- William P. Perry
- Born: 1930 (age 95–96); Elmira, New York
- Education: Harvard University
- Occupations: Composer, TV and theater producer
- Spouse: Marina Perry

William P. Perry (born 1930 in Elmira, New York) is an American composer and producer of television and film. His music has been performed by the Chicago Symphony, the Saint Louis Symphony, the Detroit Symphony and the symphonic orchestras of Cincinnati, Minnesota, Montreal, Calgary and Hartford as well as the Vienna Symphony, the Rome Philharmonic, the Slovak Philharmonic, the RTÉ National Symphony of Ireland and other orchestras in Europe.

== Biography ==
Born in Elmira, New York in 1930, he attended Harvard University and studied with Paul Hindemith, Walter Piston, and Randall Thompson. For twelve years, Perry was the music director and composer-in-residence at the Museum of Modern Art in New York, where he composed and performed as a pianist more than two hundred scores for the Museum's silent film collection.

=== TV work ===
After working at MOMA, he produced a PBS television series, The Silent Years (1971, 1975) hosted by Orson Welles and Lillian Gish, which won an Emmy Award. Perry is often credited with having played a major role in the revival of interest in classic silent films.

For three years (1976–1978) he produced a national poetry series for PBS, Anyone for Tennyson, starring Henry Fonda, Jack Lemmon, Claire Bloom, William Shatner and Vincent Price among others. Fifty programs were presented over three seasons with more than three hundred poets represented. From these programs, he later developed and produced the four-part DVD series, The Poetry Hall of Fame" which he also hosted.

He was executive producer and composed the music for the Peabody Award-winning "Mark Twain Series" of feature films on PBS (1980–1985). These films, produced by Perry's Great Amwell Company in association with the Nebraska ETV Network, also won five Cine Golden Eagle Awards. Novelist Kurt Vonnegut introduced the series, which began with "Life on the Mississippi" and culminated with a four-hour adaptation of "Adventures of Huckleberry Finn." This version for the first time emphasized the book's darker realities.

Perry directed the first color commercial to be broadcast live coast-to-coast (during The Price is Right) and the first musical commercial ever produced and broadcast on videotape (during The Jackie Gleason Show).

=== Theater ===
Perry's Broadway musical, Wind in the Willows, starring Nathan Lane, received a Tony nomination for its original score (1986).

His dramatizations of the works of Mark Twain have included a staged musical biography, Mark Twain: The Musical, that ran for ten summers (1987–1995) in his home city of Elmira and in Hartford, Connecticut. PBS produced a television version of the show. In 2009, LML Music issued a CD of the complete original cast recording.

=== Music ===
His most prominent symphonic compositions include the Jamestown Concerto for Cello and Orchestra (2007), written to celebrate the 400th anniversary of the first permanent colony in America in Jamestown, Virginia. It was released on CD by Naxos Records with Yehuda Hanani as soloist and the RTÉ National Symphony Orchestra conducted by William Eddins. His Concerto for Trumpet and Orchestra was written for and recorded by Armando Ghitalla with the composer conducting. A Naxos recording called "Music for Great Films of the Silent Era" includes his Three Rhapsodies for Piano and Orchestra, the Gemini Concerto for Violin, Piano and Orchestra, written for the Albek Duo, and the suite, Six Title Themes in Search of a Movie. A second Naxos release, "Music for Great Films of the Silent Era - Part 2" includes the song suite Silent Film Heroines with mezzo-soprano Wallis Giunta; the Summer Nocturne for Flute and Orchestra with Timothy Hutchins as soloist; a Concerto for Ophicleide and Orchestra called Brass From the Past performed by Nick Byrne; and a World War One commemorative tone poem based on the film Hearts of the World.

For both silent film recordings, Paul Phillips conducted the RTÉ National Symphony Orchestra. Perry's most recent Naxos recording (2019) entitled "Toujours Provence: Music for Stage and Screen" includes the four-part suite: Toujours Provence: A Musical Guidebook for Orchestra and Piano and the full-length Wind in the Willows Ballet. Michael Chertock is the piano soloist, and Paul Phillips conducts the Slovak Philharmonic Orchestra and Choir. Perry's music is published by Trobriand Music Company.

=== Other activities and awards ===
In addition to his film and musical work, William Perry has maintained a separate business life. In 2000, he and his wife, Marina Perry, founded Right Face Ltd., a skin care company distributing products throughout the world under the brand name Rosacea Care.

Over the years William Perry has won more than a dozen ASCAP Awards for his musical compositions, and in 1984 Elmira College conferred upon him the honorary degree of Doctor of Letters in recognition of his contributions to the field of Mark Twain studies.

== Trobriand Music Company ==
The Trobriand Music Company is a music publishing company located in Great Barrington, Massachusetts, principally engaged in the publication and distribution of the musical works of Perry. Among the major works represented by Trobriand are Perry's Concerto for Trumpet and Orchestra, Summer Nocturne for Flute and Orchestra, the Jamestown Concerto for Cello and Orchestra, the orchestral suite from Life on the Mississippi and the ballet The Wind in the Willows, based on the Broadway stage musical that starred Nathan Lane. Trobriand Music is also the publisher and licensor of the Mark Twain stage musical Mark Twain: The Musical, for which William Perry wrote the music and lyrics.

A number of major composers and arrangers have contributed their talents to the compositions represented in the Trobriand catalogue. Included among these are William David Brohn, Richard Hayman, Peter Breiner, Donald Sosin and Robert Nowak.

Trobriand has also commissioned works for important contemporary soloists. This includes a Trumpet Concerto for Armando Ghitalla, the Jamestown Concerto for Cello and Orchestra for Yehuda Hanani, the Summer Nocturne for flutist Keith Bryan and the Gemini Concerto for Violin, Piano and Orchestra for the Albek Duo.

The company has been affiliated with the American Society of Composers, Authors and Publishers (ASCAP) since 1975. Trobriand publications are represented on a number of record labels including Naxos, Bridge, Opus, Premier, and LML Music.

=== Recent Discography ===
- Armando Ghitalla: A Trumpet Legacy William Perry, composer and conductor (Bridge 2007)
- The Innocents Abroad Mark Twain Film Scores (Naxos, 2008)
- Jamestown Concerto American Music for Cello and Orchestra (Naxos, 2008)
- Mr. Mark Twain Original Cast Recording (LML 2009)
- The Romance of the Silver Screen (Naxos, 2009)

== List of works ==
=== Stage musicals ===
- On the Double (1946)
- Xanadu: The Marco Polo Musical (1953)
- Happily Ever After (1967)
- Wind in the Willows (1985)
- Mark Twain: The Musical (1987)

=== Film and television scores ===
- Life on the Mississippi (1980)
- The Private History of a Campaign That Failed (1981)
- The Mysterious Stranger (1982)
- The Innocents Abroad (1983)
- Pudd'nhead Wilson (1984)
- Adventures of Huckleberry Finn (1985)

=== Silent film scores (selection) ===
- The Gold Rush
- The General
- Steamboat Bill, Jr.
- The Mark of Zorro
- Blood and Sand
- Orphans of the Storm
- The Beloved Rogue
- Down to the Sea in Ships
- Hearts of the World
- College
- It
- Broken Blossoms
- The Black Pirate
- Sparrows
- Way Down East
- The Iron Horse
- Metropolis
- Show People
- Tempest
- Intolerance
- The Last Laugh
- Storm Over Asia
- Stella Dallas
- Seventh Heaven
- What Price Glory?

=== Major orchestral works ===
- Concerto for Trumpet and Orchestra (1986)
- Two Dance Pieces for Trumpet and Orchestra (1986)
- Summer Nocturne for Flute and Orchestra (1988)
- Life on the Mississippi Suite (1992)
- The Horse-Cavalry Suite (1998)
- Jamestown Concerto for Cello and Orchestra (2007)
- Six Title Themes in Search of a Movie (2008)
- Gemini Concerto: An Entertainment for Violin, Piano and Orchestra (2009)
- The Silent Years: Three Rhapsodies for Piano and Orchestra (2010)
- Brass from the Past: Concerto for Ophicleide and Orchestra (2012)
- Silent Film Heroines: A Song-Suite for Mezzo Soprano and Orchestra (2013)
- Market Street Overture (2014)
- Hearts of the World (2014)
- Wind in the Willows Ballet (2015)
- Pioneer Valley: The First Frontier (2016)
- Swordplay! A Curtain-Raiser (2017)
- Fiona (2018)
- Toujours Provence: A Musical Guidebook for Orchestra and Piano (2018)

== Discography ==
- The Beloved Rogue and other scores from The Silent Years William Perry, piano (Premier Recordings 1994)
- Armando Ghitalla: A Trumpet Legacy William Perry, composer and conductor (Bridge 2007)
- The Innocents Abroad Mark Twain Film Scores (Naxos, 2008)
- Jamestown Concerto American Music for Cello and Orchestra (Naxos, 2008)
- Mr. Mark Twain Original Cast Recording (LML 2009)
- The Romance of the Silver Screen (Naxos, 2009)
- Music for Great Films of the Silent Era (Naxos, 2011)
- Music for Great Films of the Silent Era Part 2 (Naxos, 2015)
- Toujours Provence: Music for Stage and Screen (Naxos, 2019)
