= Mark Twain: The Musical =

Mark Twain: The Musical is a stage musical biography of Mark Twain that had a ten-year summertime run in Elmira, NY and Hartford, CT (1987–1995) and was telecast on a number of public television stations. An original cast CD was released by Premier Recordings in 1988, and LML Music in 2009 issued a newly mastered and complete version of the score. Video and DVD versions of the show are currently in release.

The book was written by Jane Iredale with music and lyrics by William P. Perry. Dennis Rosa was the director and choreographer, and William David Brohn was musical arranger and music director. Throughout its run, the title role of Mark Twain was performed by William Perley and the primary singing role of ”Jim” was played by Jack Waddell. The role of Olivia Langdon Clemens, Mark Twain's wife and editor, was played in the film and stage version in 1988 by Bernadette Wilson.

The musical was conceived on a massive scale with a cast of more than sixty, and the production designs by William Groom called for a forty-foot turntable and a Mississippi riverboat that rose to a vertical height of fifty-five feet. The performing venues were appropriately large: in Elmira a hockey arena under a geodesic dome and in Hartford the largest National Guard armory in New England. The musical has since been rewritten in reduced scale suitable for proscenium production and will shortly be available from Trobriand Music Company under the title “Mr. Mark Twain.” In 2009, a complete original cast recording was released on CD by LML Music.

The musical combines scenes from Mark Twain's life with production numbers based on his best-loved books including "The Adventures of Tom Sawyer", "Life on the Mississippi", "The Innocents Abroad", "Adventures of Huckleberry Finn", and "A Connecticut Yankee in King Arthur's Court."

In 1989, William Perry went to Moscow and selected twenty-four dancers from the Bolshoi Ballet and other prestige Russian dance companies and brought them to America to appear in the production, the first occasion that Russian performers had become integrated members of an American cast rather than simply appearing as a touring national troupe. This was a remarkable event during Cold War years, and then Russian President Mikhail Gorbachev saluted the collaboration in a television address. Dancers from Russia, including children, appeared in all subsequent years of the run and became a highlight of the production.

== Musical Numbers ==
Act I

- Prelude
- We're Goin' Fishin'
- A Pilot on the Mississippi
- Welcome to Paris
- The Can-Can
- Roughing It
- The Skating Madrigal
- I Know There's a Place
- The House on the Hill

Act II

- The Camelot Rag
- Russian Dance
- When Out on the River
- Let's Give the Folks a Taste of Royalty
- Swing Low, Sweet Chariot
- Men of Oxford
- Finale: I Know There's a Place; Homeward Bound

== Plot Synopsis ==
Please be aware that "Mark Twain ~ The Musical" underwent several changes over its ten year run. The synopsis below is reasonably accurate, but over time some of the scenes mentioned below were altered for various reasons.

=== Act One ===
Mark Twain in his mid-30s arrives at Quarry Farm, his summer home in Elmira, New York. He greets the audience and begins to recount how he came to be in Elmira, far from his Missouri beginnings. As he talks about the past, two characters from his book, The Adventures of Tom Sawyer, appear – Aunt Polly leading the very same Tom Sawyer by the ear.

Twain admits to a certain similarity between himself and the recalcitrant Tom. He watches with amusement as Tom, doomed to white-washing Aunt Polly's fence, inveigles his pals into performing the task for him. They have entered, teasing Tom with the song, We’re Goin’ Fishin’, and they exit with a victorious Tom singing along with them.

Twain explains that his joyous boyhood was over when his father died and he had to make a living. After a period as a printer's apprentice, he ran away to become a pilot on the Mississippi River. We see the young Mark Twain, known then as Samuel Langhorne Clemens, express his excitement at the prospect of his life on a steamboat as he sings A Pilot on the Mississippi.

The Civil War brought an abrupt end to Twain's career on the river, and for a brief period he joined the Confederate militia. But he soon headed West, propelled by fatigue brought on by “constant retreating” and his dislike of killing. It was here that he became a newspaper reporter and was sent by his paper, the Alta California, to cover the first American pleasure tour abroad. His arrival on French soil inspires the song, Welcome to Paris. Then he and his traveling companion, Charlie Langdon, are taken to the sensation of the day – a Paris nightclub where they watch and take part in The Can-Can.

While at the club, Charlie shows Twain a miniature portrait of his sister, Olivia, known as Livy. Twain immediately falls in love. On his return to America, he writes a hugely successful book about his travels which he calls The Innocents Abroad, and then he sets about courtship in earnest. Livy proves to be an elusive target. She resists his advances even though he regales her with stories of his past adventures, including his colorful years as a miner in the West. Even the boisterous singing and dancing of Roughing It fails to move her. But gradually she succumbs, and when we return to present time, Twain is married with three daughters and is blissfully happy.

He also has built a picturesque and expensive new home at Nook Farm in Hartford, next door to Harriet Beecher Stowe. The house sits on a small hill below which is a pond which freezes over in the winter and inspires Twain to compose verses for The Skating Madrigal.

Much of Twain's life in Hartford is spent in socializing and entertaining. But in the summers, he concentrates on his writing at Quarry Farm, and one of his greatest joys is to gather his family in the evening on the porch and share with them the pages he has written during the day. On this evening, he reads them the first chapters of Adventures of Huckleberry Finn. The family is entranced as the scene literally comes alive in front of them. It ends with Jim and Huck floating off down the river on their raft while Jim sings of the freedom he knows will be his in I Know There's a Place.

But Twain's happiness disappears when his financial world is ruined by his own reckless investments, and he is forced to move his family abroad to save on expenses. He leaves his favorite daughter, Susy, behind so she can enter college. The Act closes with Susy wistfully waving her beloved family goodbye as she sings The House on the Hill, and their carriage pulls off.

=== Act Two ===
The Act opens with Twain and Livy in London at a performance of his A Connecticut Yankee in King Arthur’s Court before Queen Victoria. After the singing and dancing of The Camelot Rag, the Queen admits that she has been really “quite amused”, and Livy tells her husband that God is the only famous person he has yet to meet.

Their spirits are high though a telegram from the States arrives telling them that Susy had fallen ill. It is not thought to be serious, but suddenly the newsboys hawking their newspapers call out that “Mark Twain’s daughter dies of spinal meningitis.” The family is devastated. They return home for the burial, but Livy insists that they continue abroad until all their debts are paid. Twain reluctantly embarks on a world-wide lecture tour.

One of his stops involves Russia, where he is meets the Czar and is entertained by a folk troupe performing a Russian Dance.

At the age of sixty, now free of debt, he returns home a hero and internationally recognized as a man of letters. His love for Livy is as strong as ever, which he expresses in a tender scene with her when he recognizes the huge contribution she has made to his life. She asks what he is most proud of, and he tells her that it is Huckleberry Finn. As she moves into the house leaving him to reminisce, the raft bearing Jim and Huck reappears. Together they sing When Out on the River.

The peace of the Mississippi is soon shattered by the appearance of the King and the Duke who are escaping from irate townsfolk. Huck lets them take shelter on the raft but soon realizes that he has provided haven for a couple of scoundrels. Without further ado, in a riotous song entitled Let's Give the Folks a Taste of Royalty, they devise their plans for hoaxing the citizens of the next community they come to. Twain abandons his reverie as the King and the Duke are once again driven out of town.

Twain's thoughts return to Livy and her obviously failing health. Hoping that the warm climate of Italy might help her, he sets up house in Florence. But she is suffering from a heart disease. Fragile and exhausted, she dies in his arms. He remembers the first song he sang during their days of courtship, Swing Low, Sweet Chariot.

She is buried next to Susy in Woodlawn Cemetery in Elmira. Grief-stricken, Twain retreats to Quarry Farm. His comfort comes in the form of an invitation to go to Oxford University in England to be awarded the degree of Doctor of Letters. This long-cherished dream sends Twain off on his last overseas journey. Along with Auguste Rodin, Camille Saint-Saëns and Rudyard Kipling, Twain receives his honor as the graduation students sing Men of Oxford.

Twain steps off the podium and makes his way through the students who discard their gowns and reveal themselves as the characters from his books. One by one they greet him with the words he placed in their mouths. The final character is Jim who reprises I Know There's a Place. As the mists of time begin to swirl, Twain mounts the steps of Quarry Farm where Livy is waiting with outstretched arms. They go inside as the chorus sings Homeward Bound. The house slowly begins to turn, and a great Mississippi Riverboat swings into view. Twain is in the pilot house, home at last.

== Trivia ==
- In a rare observance of site specificity, the Elmira production took place only seven miles from Mark Twain's actual gravesite, and the Hartford production was held just a mile and a half from Mark Twain's house, now a museum.
- Though Mark Twain is best known for his books, he also wrote several plays and in one instance composed a set of verses extolling his new home in Hartford. These were published in The Traveller's Record, January 1877 and form the basis for The Skating Madrigal in Act One of the musical.
- In a case of life imitating subject, composer/lyricist William Perry achieved academic recognition when Elmira College awarded him the degree of Doctor of Letters (1984) for his production of the Mark Twain Series on PBS.
