= Nathaniel Mayfield =

American trumpet player

Nathaniel Bryant Mayfield is an internationally recognized trumpet soloist and prizewinner. Prior to his enrollment at the Juilliard School of Music as a student of Raymond Mase (Chairman of the Brass Department, The Juilliard School), Mayfield studied trumpet at Interlochen Arts Academy, as well as the Tanglewood Institute. In 1994, he was awarded a Presidential Scholarship, and was the winner of the 1994 National Trumpet Competition (HS Division), the 1997 International Trumpet Guild Solo Competition, the 1995 Aspen Brass Concerto Competition, the 1997 Yamaha Young Performing Artist Competition, and has advanced in numerous other International Solo Competitions (Kiev, Ukraine, Markneukirchen, Germany and the Ellsworth-Smith International Competition in Bad Saeckingen, Germany).

He was awarded a Fulbright Scholarship for further study with Professor Reinhold Friedrich at the Hochschule für Musik Karlsruhe, Germany.

After returning to Texas from abroad, Mayfield was appointed Director of Music for The Austin School for the Performing and Visual Arts, and also Executive Director for the Austin Brass Center, both 501-C3 non-profit organizations. He is currently Instructor of Trumpet at Texas A&M University in College Station, TX. Along with trumpet virtuosi Paul Merkelo and Rex Richardson, he is one of the three trumpeters in "NEXT" Ensemble, an international group that incorporates baroque, jazz and classical/romantic trumpet in contemporary/experimental settings. A firm believer in expanding the trumpet repertoire, Mayfield has premiered and recorded works by composers Eric Ewazen, James Stephenson, Eric McIntyre, P.K. Waddle, and Filip Sande of Norway.
