= Wind in the Willows (1985 musical) =

1985 musical

- Music: William P. Perry
- Lyrics: Roger McGough and William P. Perry
- Book: Jane Iredale
- Basis: The Wind in the Willows by Kenneth Grahame
- Productions: 1985 Broadway

Wind in the Willows is a musical based on the novel of the same name, with music by William P. Perry, lyrics by Roger McGough and Perry, and a book by Jane Iredale.

The musical premiered in August 1983, at the Folger Theatre in Washington, D.C.

The Broadway production opened at the Nederlander Theatre on December 19, 1985, and closed after only four performances. Directed by Tony Stevens and choreographed by Margery Beddow, the cast featured Nathan Lane as Toad, David Carroll as Rat, Vicki Lewis as Mole, and P. J. Benjamin as Chief Weasel.

Wind in the Willows was nominated for two Tony Awards: Best Book of a Musical and Best Original Score.

== Awards and nominations ==
=== Original Broadway production ===
| Year | Award | Category | Nominee | Result |
|---|---|---|---|---|
| 1986 | Tony Award | Best Book of a Musical | Jane Iredale | Nominated |
| 1986 | Tony Award | Best Original Score | William P. Perry and Roger McGough | Nominated |
