= John MacMurray =

Canadian musician

John MacMurray

John Stewart Wright MacMurray (30 December 1958 – 20 August 2006) was a Canadian musician from Saint John, New Brunswick, who held the position of principal trumpet with the Hallé Orchestra of Great Britain from 1986 to 2006. He died at the age of 47 after being diagnosed with cancer.

== Early career ==
John Stewart Wright MacMurray was born on 30 December 1958 to Wallace MacMurray and Norma MacMurray in Saint John, New Brunswick. MacMurray began playing the trumpet at the age of 15. Bruce Holder recruited him to play in the Third Field Artillery Band, after watching him play at a school performance. At that time, he was the youngest member of the band. He received his Undergraduate Degree from McGill University, Montreal, and his Masters Degree in Performance from the University of Michigan. He was tutored by teachers such as William Vacchiano and Armando Ghitalla. In 1981, he continued his musical education at Goldsmiths College in London. He also played for the London Symphony and the London Philharmonic.

== The Hallé Orchestra ==
For 3 years, MacMurray performed as co-principal in the Hallé Orchestra along with John Dickinson and, in 1986, he first performed as principal trumpet. He held this position until his death in 2006. Despite the early end to MacMurray's career, only two people have held the principal position longer, going back before Harry Mortimer to Alex Harris in 1919.

In addition to tutoring privately, MacMurray held teaching posts at Chetham's School of Music and the Royal Northern College of Music. While performing with the Hallé Orchestra, MacMurray was diagnosed twice with cancer. Due to his illness, he took seven months leave-of-absence from the orchestra, but began performing again with the Hallé on the BBC.

== Personal life ==
MacMurray was married to Susie MacMurray and had two sons. In July 2006, MacMurray was diagnosed with cancer for a third time. He died the next month and his funeral took place on 29 August near his home in Macclesfield, England.

== Legacy ==
In September 2006, the Hallé dedicated its evening concert at the Bridgewater Hall to his memory with a performance of Bach's Brandenburg Concerto No.5 and a performance of Mahler's Symphony No.5. Conductor Mark Elder spoke of his former colleague at the evening, and an obituary was provided in the programme notes by trumpeter and personal friend of MacMurray's, Ken Brown.
