= 20th GMA Dove Awards =

1989 US music awards ceremony

- Date: April 13, 1989
- Location: Nashville, Tennessee

The 20th Annual GMA Dove Awards were held on April 13, 1989, recognizing accomplishments of musicians for the year 1988. The show was held in Nashville, Tennessee.

== Award recipients ==
- Song of the Year
  - "Friend Of A Wounded Heart"; Wayne Watson, Claire Cloninger; Word (ASCAP)
- Songwriter of the Year
  - Steven Curtis Chapman
- Male Vocalist of the Year
  - Wayne Watson
- Female Vocalist of the Year
  - Sandi Patty
- Group of the Year
  - Take 6
- Artist of the Year
  - Amy Grant
- New Artist of the Year
  - Take 6
- Southern Gospel Album of the Year
  - Goin' In Style; The Cathedrals; Lari Goss; Homeland
- Southern Gospel Recorded Song of the Year
  - "Champion Of Love"; The Cathedrals; Phil Cross, Caroly Cross; RiverSong
- Inspirational Album of the Year
  - Make His Praise Glorious; Sandi Patty; Greg Nelson, Sandi Patti Helvering*; Word
- NOTE: The legal name was not changed until 1994.
- Inspirational Recorded Song of the Year
  - "In Heaven's Eyes"; Sandi Patty; Phil McHugh; Word
- Pop/Contemporary Album of the Year
  - Lead Me On; Amy Grant; Brown Bannister; Myrrh
- Pop/Contemporary Recorded Song of the Year
  - "His Eyes"; Steven Curtis Chapman; Steven Curtis Chapman; Sparrow
- Contemporary Gospel Album of the Year
  - Take 6; Take 6; Mark Kibble, Claude V. McKnight III, Mervyn E. Warren; Reprise Records
- Contemporary Gospel Recorded Song of the Year
  - "If We Ever"; Take 6; Public Domain; Reunion
- Traditional Gospel Album of the Year
  - Live...In Chicago; Shirley Caesar; Bubba Smith, Shirley Caesar; Rejoice
- Traditional Gospel Recorded Song of the Year (formerly Traditional Black Gospel)
  - "Hold My Mule"; Shirley Caesar; Shirley Caesar Williams; Word
- Country Album of the Year
  - Richest Man In Town; Bruce Carroll; Bubba Smith; New Canaan
- Country Recorded Song of the Year
  - "Above And Beyond"; Bruce Carroll; Bruce Carroll, Paul Smith; Word
- Rock Album of the Year
  - Russ Taff; Russ Taff; Jack Joseph Puig; Myrrh
- Rock Recorded Song of the Year
  - "Won By One"; Mylon & Broken Heart; Scot Allen, Trent Arganti, Kenneth Bentley, Ben Hewitt, Paul Joseph, Mylon LeFevre, Joe Hardy; Star Song
- Hard Music Album of the Year
  - In God We Trust; Stryper; Stryper, Michael Lloyd; Enigma
- Hard Music Recorded Song of the Year
  - "In God We Trust"; Stryper; Stryper; Benson
- Instrumental Album of the Year
  - A Symphony Of Praise; Sandi Patti; David T Clydesdale; Word
- Praise and Worship Album of the Year
  - Praise 10; Maranatha! Singers; Smitty Price, Tom Coomes; Maranatha!
- Children's Music Album of the Year
  - Wise Guys and Starry Skies; Kathie Hill; Kathie Hill, Randall Dennis; Sparrow
- Musical Album
  - In His Presence, The Ridden King; Dick and Melodie Tunney; Dick and Melodie Tunney; Genevox
- Choral Collection Album
  - Sandi Patty Choral Praise; Greg Nelson; Word Music
- Short Form Music Video of the Year
  - "Lead Me On"; Amy Grant; Tina Silvey; Andrew Doucette; Myrrh
- Long Form Music Video of the Year
  - Carmen Live...Radically Saved; Carman; Cindy Dupree; George J. Flanigen IV and Robert Deaton; Benson
- Recorded Music Packaging of the Year
  - PATRICK POLLEI, JOAN TANKERSLEY; PHILLIP DIXON; Russ Taff; Russ Taff
