= Anyone for Tennyson? =

Anyone for Tennyson? is a series of fifty programs of poetry-in-performance that ran nationally on the Public Broadcasting Service (PBS) from 1976–1978. The winner of numerous awards, it was produced by the Nebraska Educational TV Network in Lincoln in association with the Great Amwell Company of New York City. Over the three seasons, more than 700 poems by more than 300 poets were presented.

The program was built around The First Poetry Quartet consisting of Cynthia Herman, Jill Tanner, George Backman and Paul Hecht. Mr. Hecht's role was later played by Norman Snow and Victor Bevine. To this ensemble were added numerous guest stars including Henry Fonda, Jack Gwillim, Jack Lemmon, Claire Bloom, Vincent Price, William Shatner, Irene Worth, James Whitmore, Fred Gwynne and Jim Dale.

Programs were often shot on locations appropriate to the poets or poetic themes being presented. The Shakespeare program was filmed in and around Stratford-on-Avon and Wordsworth and Coleridge in England’s Lake District. Walt Whitman’s Civil War poetry was taped on the battlefield at Gettysburg, and American Indian Poetry was shot in Taos, New Mexico and the Black Hills of South Dakota.

Producers and continuity writers for the series were William P. Perry and Jane Iredale. Marshall Jamison was executive producer and director of the majority of the programs with Ron Nicodemus also directing during the first season. Dr. Ron Hull was the executive-in-charge for the Nebraska Network, and Dr. Laurie Zwicky was the literary advisor. Dr. Zwicky also developed a college credit course built around the programs.

Many of the programs have continued to be seen on video and DVD, including a four-hour DVD anthology called “The Poetry Hall of Fame” hosted by William Perry.

== List of Programs ==
=== First Season ===
Program / Guest Star / Location

- Poems of the Sea --- Mystic Seaport, CT
- The Restoration Wits --- Cyril Ritchard --- Lincoln, NE
- The Heroic Tradition: Scott, Tennyson, Kipling --- Lincoln
- The World of Emily Dickinson --- Claire Bloom --- Hartford, CT
- Limericks, Epigrams and Occasional Verse --- George Plimpton --- Jackson, MS
- Walt Whitman and the Civil War --- Richard Kiley --- Gettysburg, PA
- A Program of Satire --- Lincoln
- Voices from the South --- Ruby Dee --- Atlanta, GA
- Longfellow: A Rediscovery --- Will Geer --- Lincoln
- The American Dream ---Henry Fonda --- Lincoln
- Pulitzer Prize Poets, Part I --- Rochester, NY
- Pulitzer Prize Poets, Part II --- Rochester, NY
- Frontier Poetry ---Cameron Mitchell --- Tempe, AZ
- An Invitation to Romance --- Lincoln
- A Journey Through Life: Edna St. Vincent Millay --- Valerie Harper --- Lincoln
- A Quiet Evening with Mother Goose --- Lincoln
- The Growth of a Poet: Sylvia Plath --- Lincoln
- A Poetic Feast --- Vincent Price --- Lincoln
- An American Original: e.e. cummings --- Lincoln
- A View of Four Centuries --- Lincoln

=== Second Season ===
- New England in Autumn: The Poetry of Robert Frost --- Springfield, MA
- William Shakespeare: A Poet For All Time: --- Alan Howard --- Stratford-on-Avon and Warwick, England
- The Poetical Art of William Blake --- Lincoln
- Thomas Hardy's Wessex --- Roger Hammond --- Dorset, England
- The Men Who Marched Away: Poetry from World War I --- Darren McGavin --- Lincoln
- A Visit with Sir John --- Sir John Betjeman --- Cambridge, England
- Poetry in Translation: Classical and Mediterranean --- Lincoln
- Poetry in Translation: Oriental and Russian --- Lincoln
- The Brontës of Haworth --- Haworth, England and Lincoln
- A Poetic Portrait Gallery (with Spoon River Anthology) --- William Shatner --- Lincoln
- The Lake Poets: Wordsworth and Coleridge --- The Lake District, England
- The Lowells: An American Family of Poets --- Lincoln
- A Tribute to Anonymous --- Fred Gwynne --- Hartford, CT
- Poets on Campus --- Lincoln
- So That’s Where It's From! --- Lincoln

=== Third Season ===
- Ogden and Dorothy, Phyllis and Yip --- Jack Lemmon --- Los Angeles, CA
- A Zooful of Poetry --- San Diego, CA
- The Glorious Romantics; I. Lord Byron --- Jean Marsh, John Neville-Andrews, Neil Hunt, Rachel Gurney --- Lincoln and London, England
- The Glorious Romantics: II John Keats --- Jean Marsh, John Neville-Andrews, John Woodeson, Ginni Ness --- Lincoln and Hampstead, England
- The Glorious Romantics: III Percy Bysshe Shelley --- Jean Marsh, John Neville-Andrews, Stephen Lang, Neil Hunt --- Lincoln and Fire Island Beach, NY
- In Praise of the Lord --- Lincoln
- William Butler Yeats: The Heart of Ireland --- Irene Worth --- Lincoln
- Poetry of the Occult --- San Diego, CA and Lincoln
- D.H. Lawrence: A Restless Spirit --- Robert Culp --- Taos, NM
- Roger McGough and the Liverpool Lads --- Jim Dale --- Lincoln
- Robert and Elizabeth Browning --- Jack Gwillim --- Lincoln
- The Poetry of Youth --- LeVar Burton --- Lincoln
- American Indian Poetry --- John Two Birds Arbuckle --- Black Hills, SD and Taos, NM
- The Pleasure of Poetry --- James Whitmore --- Lincoln
- Love Conquers All --- Lincoln
