= Gaston Dufresne =

American bassist (1898–1998)

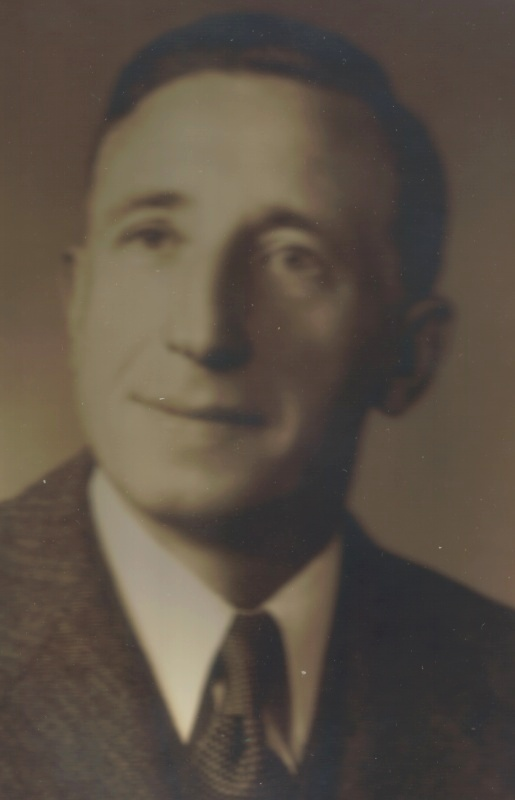

Gaston Dufresne (9 September 1898 – 6 December 1998) was the principal bassist in the Boston Symphony Orchestra from 1927 to 1957 and with the Florida West Coast Symphony from 1963 to 1979. Among his contrabass students were American composer Leroy Anderson and Boston Symphony principal trumpeter Roger Voisin. He also taught solfège, a singing technique used to teach pitch, for which his students included future-musicologist Robert Gjerdingen.

Dufresne wrote Develop Sight Reading, a book of progressive sight reading studies which has been transcribed for use by all orchestral instruments. Dufresne was born 9 September 1898 in Lille, France and died on 6 December 1998 in Sarasota, Florida.
