= Henri Couillaud =

French classical trombonist (1878–1955)

Henri Couillaud (9 December 1878, Bourg-la-Reine – February 1955) was a French classical trombonist.

He was a soloist with the Opéra de Paris, the Orchestre de la Société des Concerts du Conservatoire, and the French Republican Guard Band. Couillaud also composed trombone studies designed to develop strong technical skills in students.

From 1925 to 1948, he served as professor of trombone at the Conservatoire de Paris, where André Lafosse worked as his assistant. He succeeded Louis Allard in the position.

Couillaud's Méthode (1946) emphasizes the role of breath control in tone production. He advocated for more concise slide movements by prioritizing the use of the instrument's first positions—a technique that also lends itself well to jazz and popular music styles.

== Works ==
- Vingt Études de Perfectionnement
- 26 Études Techniques
- Trente Études Modernes
- Études de style (Trombone solo)
- Enseignement Complet du Trombone à Coulisse par Henri Couillaud; Études et Exercises
- 12 Études Melodiques
- 4 Études en forme de duos
