= Rommel (disambiguation) =

Erwin Rommel was a German World War II field marshal.

Rommel may also refer to:

- Rommel (surname)
- Rómmel, a surname
- Rommel (film), a German television film
- German destroyer Rommel (D187), a West German guided missile destroyer
- Jurgen Vsych or Rommel, film director

== People with the given name ==
- Rommel Adducul (born 1976), Filipino basketball player
- Rommel Fernández (1966-1993), first Panamanian footballer to play in Europe
- Rommel Pacheco (born 1986), Mexican diver
- Rommel Supangan, Filipino admiral
