= René Voisin =

French trumpeter (1893–1952)

René Louis Gabriel Voisin (19 November 1893 – 16 January 1952), was a French trumpeter and a member of the Boston Symphony Orchestra trumpet section for 24 years. He was also father and teacher to Roger Voisin, the trumpet player and pedagogue who would later become principal trumpet of the Boston Symphony.

== Biography ==
René Louis Gabriel Voisin was born on 19 November 1893 in Angers, France. Voisin was a student of Pierre Vignal (1879–1943) at the Conservatoire de Paris. Whilst in Paris, Voisin worked as a freelance musician, and played in the first performance of Igor Stravinsky's The Rite of Spring; here he also became friends with conductor Sergei Koussevitzky and played with the Orchestre de la Société des Concerts du Conservatoire between 1920 and 1928.

Koussévitzky later succeeded Pierre Monteux as music director of the Boston Symphony Orchestra, and brought Voisin to the Boston Symphony as fourth trumpet in 1928. Voisin was a member of the Boston Symphony Orchestra trumpet section for 24 years, between 1928 and his death in 1952.
