= Sandi Patti and the Friendship Company =

Studio album by Sandi Patti
- Released: 1989
- Genre: CCM, children's music
- Length: 37:47
- Label: Word
- Producer: Greg Nelson, Sandi Patti

Sandi Patti chronology
Make His Praise Glorious (1988)	Sandi Patti and the Friendship Company (1989)	The Finest Moments (1989)

Professional ratings
Review scores
Source	Rating
AllMusic	2/5 stars

Sandi Patti and the Friendship Company is the eleventh studio and first Children's music album by Christian singer Sandi Patti, released in 1989 on Word Records. The theme on this album is about friendship and how special children are to God. The album features a children's choir and Gerbert, a popular children's character based on the late 1980s television series of the same name that teaches children about kindness and friendship, making good choices, the importance of loving your neighbor and learning a valuable lesson in life, which is pretty much what this album is about. Sandi Patti and the Friendship Company went to No. 1 on the Billboard Top Christian Albums chart and would win her a GMA Dove Award for Children's Music Album of the Year at the 21st GMA Dove Awards.

== Track listing ==
No.	Title	Writer(s)	Length
1.	"The Friendship Company"	Claire Cloninger, Mark Gersmehl	3:12
2.	"Miracles Can Happen"	Brent Henderson, Craig Patty	3:14
3.	"Masterpiece"	Gloria Gaither, Brent Henderson, Craig Patty, Mike Patty	4:03
4.	"We're in This Together" (featuring Gerbert)	David Huntsinger	4:53
5.	"That's the Love of God"	Greg Nelson, Phil McHugh	3:37
6.	"Sandi's Sunday School Sing-a-Long" (medley)	Sandi Patti, arranged by David T. Clydesdale	6:30
7.	"The Miracle of Jesus"	Phil McHugh	3:07
8.	"Beautiful Feet"	Sandi Patti, Gloria Gaither	3:12
9.	"Love Makes a Friend Be a Friend Like You"	Mark Baldwin	2:35
10.	"Forever Friend"	Claire Cloninger	3:27

== Charts ==
Chart (1989)	Peak position
US Top Contemporary Christian Albums	1

=== Radio singles ===
Year	Singles	Peak positions
Year	Singles	CCM AC
1989	"Forever Friends"	1
1989	"That's The Love Of God"	7
1989	"Masterpiece"	8

== Accolades ==
GMA Dove Award

- 1990 Female Vocalist of the Year

Year	Winner	Category
1990	Sandi Patti and the Friendship Company	Children's Music Album of the Year
