= William Adam (trumpeter) =

American trumpet player and educator

Background information
- Born: William Alexander Adam; October 21, 1917; Kansas City, Kansas
- Died: November 25, 2013 (aged 96) Bloomington, Indiana
- Occupations: Trumpeter, Lecturer, Pedagogue
- Instrument: Trumpet

William Alexander Adam (October 21, 1917 – November 25, 2013) was an American trumpeter, respected pedagogue, and Professor Emeritus at Indiana University. He was highly analytical as a teacher, but always avoided discussing the mechanical aspects of trumpet playing with a student. Instead he "taught" by demonstration and by explanation in terms of sound. In his own words, "If your mind leaves the sound of the horn, obstacles will appear."

He gave many lectures throughout his life, but never wrote a book or article on his unconventional approach to trumpet. He believed such a medium was against the very nature of his teaching of trumpet. The only official documentation of his approach is a three-videotape series, A New and Different Way of Getting More Music out of Trumpet. His approach is carried on by his former students, many of whom hold positions at music schools throughout the U.S. and around the world.

He died on November 25, 2013, in Bloomington, Indiana.

== See also ==
- 20th century brass instrumentalists
- List of trumpeters
