= Vignale (disambiguation) =

Vignale, also known as Carrozzeria Alfredo Vignale, was an Italian automobile coachbuilding company active in Turin, 1948-1973.

- Vignale Gamine, a small rear-engined car produced by Vignale 1967-1971

Vignale may also refer to:

- Vignale, Haute-Corse, a commune in the Haute-Corse department of France on the island of Corsica
- Vignale Monferrato, a comune (municipality) in the Province of Alessandria in the Italian region of Piedmont
- Damon Vignale (active from 1998), Canadian writer, director, and producer working in film and television
- Federico Callori di Vignale (1890-1971), Italian Cardinal of the Roman Catholic Church
- Giovanni Vignale (born 1957), Italian-born American physicist
- Lucas A. Vignale (1997–2026), Argentine director and screenwriter
