= Roderick MacDonald (musician) =

Roderick MacDonald was principal trumpet of the Leipzig Gewandhaus Orchestra from 1989 to 2005.

In 1989, MacDonald was hired for the Gewandhaus Orchestra, one of the world's oldest symphony orchestras, directly by Maestro Kurt Masur. MacDonald is also a founding member of the Leipzig Baroque Soloists.

Prior to his appointment by Masur, MacDonald pursued his graduate studies in trumpet with Charles Schlueter at the New England Conservatory and also was a fellow at the Tanglewood Music Festival.

Roderick Macdonald has been the music director of the New England Symphony Orchestra in Leominster, Massachusetts, since 2014 and associate professor of music at State University of New York, SUNY Fredonia since 2006.
