= Charles Schlueter =

American trumpeter

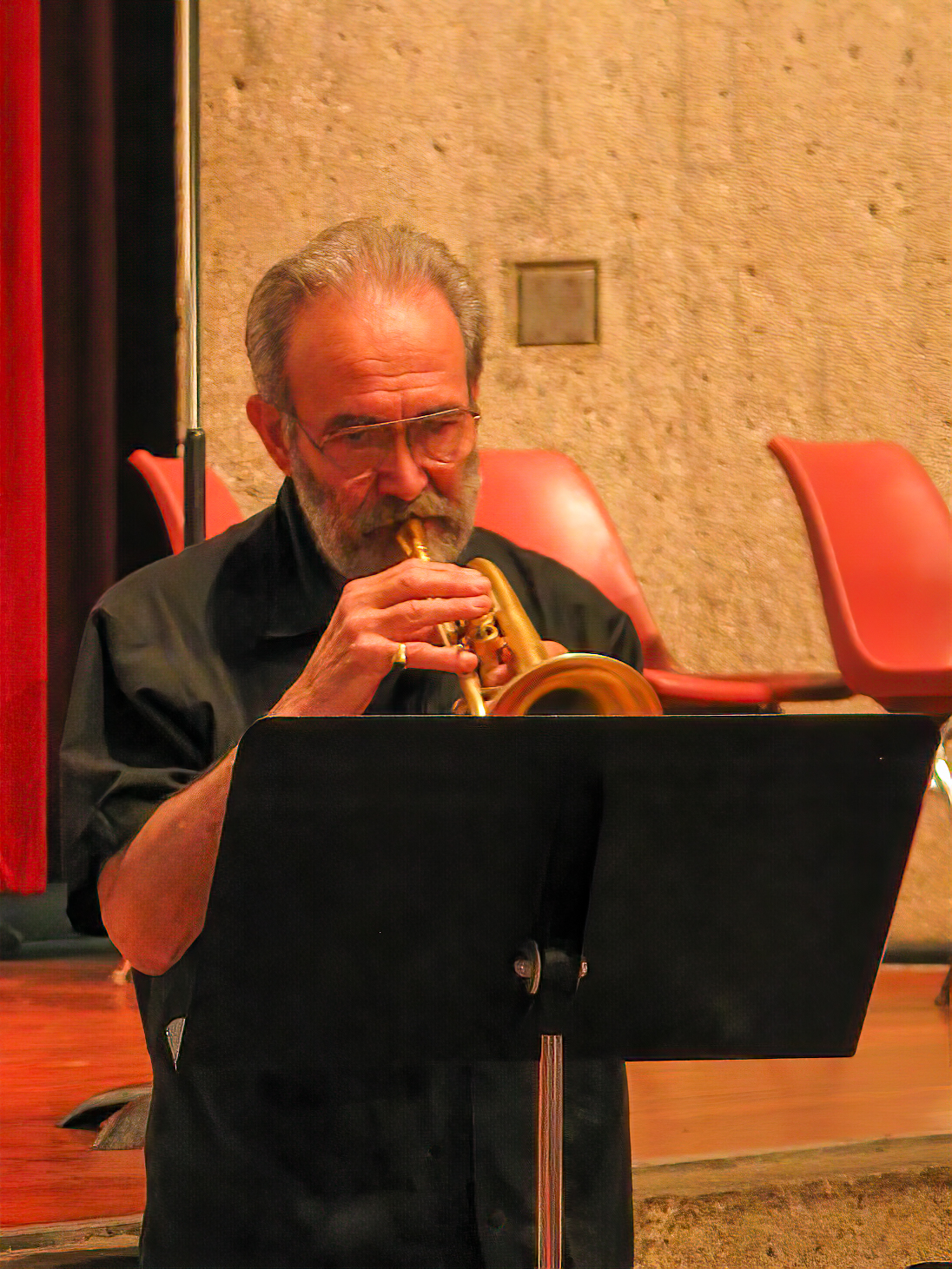
Charles Schlueter plays at the ITG Conference, UMass-Amherst, May 2007

Charles Schlueter, born in Du Quoin, Illinois, is the retired principal trumpeter of the Boston Symphony Orchestra. Schlueter studied with William Vacchiano at the Juilliard School. Prior to his 25 years as principal of the BSO, he also held positions with the Kansas City Symphony, Milwaukee Symphony Orchestra, Cleveland Orchestra, and the Minnesota Orchestra.

Charles Schlueter is also a well-known teacher, currently on the faculty of the New England Conservatory of Music, and has taught many trumpet players including Andrew Balio, (principal of the Baltimore Symphony Orchestra), Matthew Sonneborn (principal of the Naples Philharmonic Orchestra), Roderick Macdonald (former principal trumpet of the Leipzig Gewandhaus Orchestra), Jeffrey Work and David Bamonte (principal and assistant principal of the Oregon Symphony Orchestra), Dana Oakes, principal of the Boston Philharmonic Orchestra and Boston Landmarks Orchestra, and Eric Berlin (principal of the Albany Symphony Orchestra).

In addition to the many recordings made with the Minnesota Orchestra and the Boston Symphony Orchestra during his tenures there, Schlueter has released four solo albums with the Kleos Classics label. His four albums are entitled "Bravura Trumpet", "Trumpet Works", "Trumpet Concertos", and "Virtuoso Trumpet".

In 2001, he founded The Charles Schlueter Foundation, a non-profit organization "to encourage communication among brass players and to advance the level of performance, teaching and literature associated with brass instruments". Schlueter was one of the main focal points of Carl Vigeland's 1989 book In Concert: Onstage and Offstage with the Boston Symphony Orchestra, which tells the story of the symphony, its conductor Seiji Ozawa and the 1986-87 season.

Schlueter retired from the Boston Symphony Orchestra at the conclusion of the Tanglewood 2006 Season. He was Boston Musicians Association musician of the year in 2006. Schlueter received the Honorary Award, the highest honor of the International Trumpet Guild, in 2007.
