= Edward Tarr =

American trumpet player and musicologist (1936–2020)

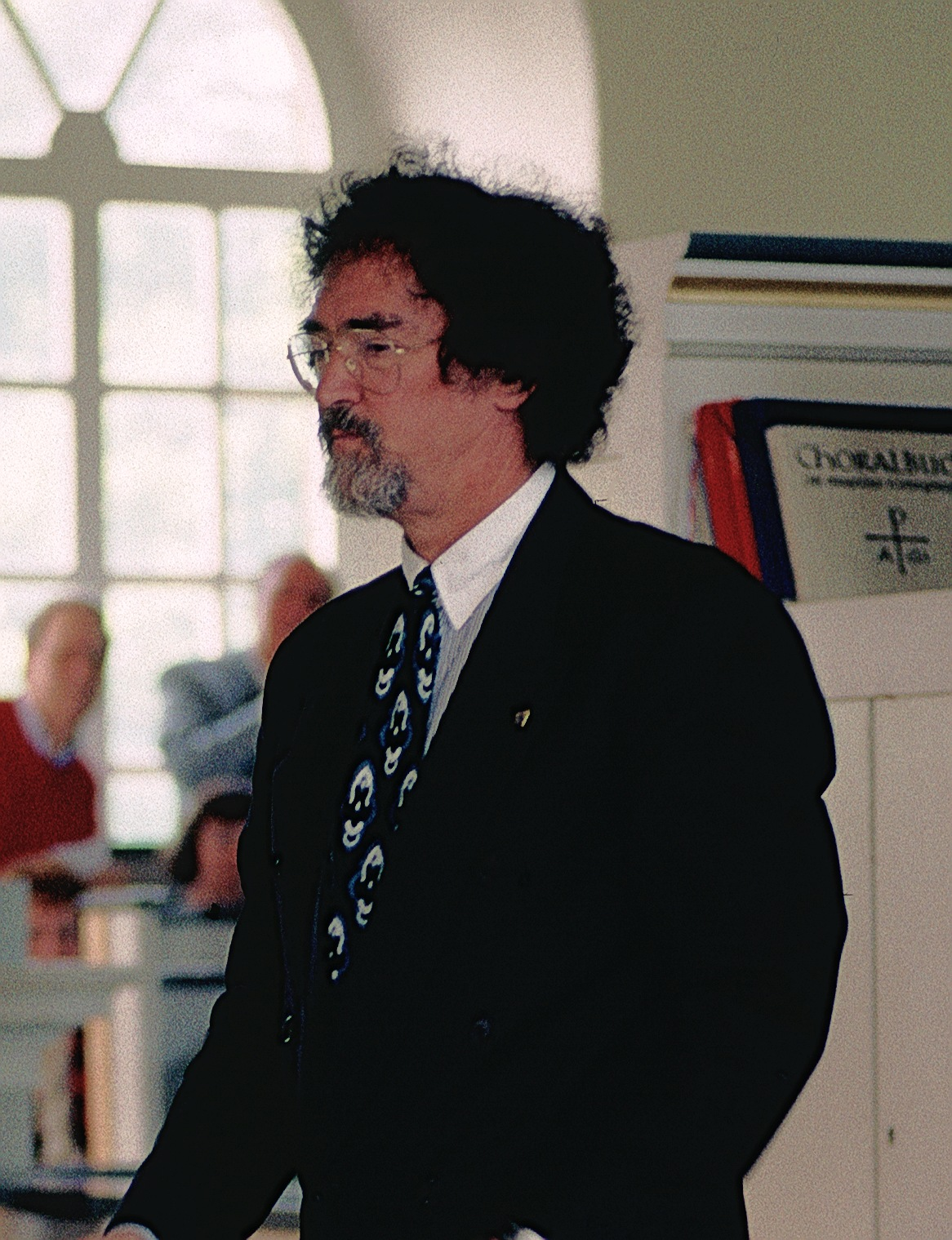
Edward H. Tarr in Hamburg (1996)

Edward Hankins Tarr (June 15, 1936 – March 24, 2020), was an American trumpet player and musicologist. He was a pioneer in the revival of Baroque and Romantic era trumpet performance practice.

== Biography ==
Edward Tarr was born in Norwich, Connecticut. Among his accomplishments is a complete edition of the trumpet works of the Bolognese Baroque Italian composer Giuseppe Torelli. His performance repertory includes Baroque, Classical era and modern works; Mauricio Kagel dedicated works to him in 1971, including Morceau de concours, for trumpeter and electronic tape. In 1953 he was a student of Roger Voisin, principal trumpet of the Boston Symphony Orchestra, and in 1958–1959 with Adolph Herseth, principal trumpet of the Chicago Symphony Orchestra. He also studied musicology in Basel with Leo Schrade (1959–1964) for which he was awarded a degree in 1985.

In 1968 the Edward Tarr Brass Ensemble was formed, the only one of its kind – with four trumpets and four trombones. Modern, as well as antique instruments, were used to perform Renaissance and Baroque music as well as modern works.

Tarr taught trumpet at the Rheinische Musikschule in Cologne (1968–70). He was director of the Trumpet Museum in Bad Säckingen, Germany from 1985 to 2004, taught modern and Baroque trumpet at the Basel Music Academy in Basel, Switzerland (modern trumpet at the Conservatory and Baroque trumpet at the Schola Cantorum Basiliensis) from 1972 to 2001 and was teaching Baroque trumpet in the superior conservatories (Musikhochschulen) of Karlsruhe, Frankfurt, and Lucerne.

Tarr owned one of the largest collections of original trumpet literature, which was acquired by the Royal Conservatoire of Scotland's Archives & Collections in 2014. He was also editor of many performance editions (including the complete trumpet works of Torelli mentioned above) as well as an authority on the history of the trumpet. His book The Trumpet was first published in 1977 in Germany as Die Trompete. In 1988 it was translated into English by S.E. Plank and Edward Tarr. When Tarr celebrated his 70th birthday in 2006, Schott published a new edition of the German version, "Die Trompete". The English version was updated and republished in 2008.

Tarr's recording career began around 1960 when he became trumpet player in Karl Richter’s Münchener Bach-Orchester. He recorded over 100 works for many labels including Ariola Records, BIS Records, Capriccio, Christophorus, Columbia Records, Deutsche Grammophon, EMI, Erato Records, HCC (Haas-Classic Cologne), Hungaroton, Musikproduktion Dabringhaus und Grimm, Naxos Records, Nonesuch Records, Oryx, Tudor, and Vox Records.

Tarr's wife was the concert organist and best-selling author Irmtraud Tarr. Amongst his students were Reinhold Friedrich and Håkan Hardenberger.

Tarr died on March 24, 2020, in a hospital near Rheinfelden, the town where he lived in southwestern Germany. The cause was complications of heart surgery.

A memorial service for Edward H. Tarr was held at St. Joseph Catholic Church in Rheinfelden (Baden), Germany on June 15, 2021.
