= Henrik Rommel =

Swedish ice hockey player

- Born: June 21, 1994 (age 31) Stockholm, Sweden
- Height: 5 ft 11 in (180 cm)
- Weight: 185 lb (84 kg; 13 st 3 lb)
- Position: Centre
- Shoots: Left
- Allsv team: AIK IF
- NHL draft: Undrafted
- Playing career: 2013–present

Henrik Rommel (born June 21, 1994) is a Swedish ice hockey player. He is playing with Nice hockey Côte d'Azur of the French top division Ligue Magnus.

Rommel made his Swedish Hockey League debut playing with AIK IF during the 2013–14 SHL season.
