= Frank Kaderabek =

- Born: 1929; Cicero, Illinois, U.S.
- Died: December 28, 2023 (aged 94) East Falls, Pennsylvania, U.S.
- Occupations: Musician, teacher
- Instrument: Trumpet
- Formerly of: Philadelphia Orchestra
- Spouse: Mary Jeanne Michael (married 1960)

Frank John Kaderabek (1929 – December 28, 2023) was an American trumpeter. From 1975 to 1995, he was principal trumpet of the Philadelphia Orchestra, and also a trumpet instructor of the Curtis Institute of Music in Philadelphia.

== Life and career ==
Born in Cicero, Illinois, to Czech immigrants, he studied with Edward Masacek and Adolph Herseth and moved to New York to study with Harry Glantz and Nathan Prager. He was principal trumpet of the Dallas Symphony (1953–1958), assistant/third trumpet with the Chicago Symphony Orchestra (1958–1967) and principal with the Detroit Symphony Orchestra (1967–1975) before joining the Philadelphia Orchestra under chief conductor Eugene Ormandy. Many of his private students and students from Curtis now play in major orchestras. He is widely regarded as one of the world's finest trumpet players and teachers.

Kaderabek remained on the faculty at West Chester University, where he served as an adjunct faculty member. While there, Kaderabek gave all of his students one-hour lessons every two weeks instead of half-hour lessons every week, saying, "You cannot accomplish anything worthwhile in only half an hour. By that time you have only just said 'hello'". Kaderabek did a clinic at the first annual West Chester University Trumpet Fest on the Fundamentals of Trumpet Playing and also participated in the Claude Gordon International Brass Workshops from 1984 until the final one in 1993.

Kaderabek died at his home in East Falls, Pennsylvania, on December 28, 2023, at the age of 94.
