= Raymond Sabarich =

Raymond Antoine Sabarich (23 July 1909, in Toulouse – 5 April 1966) was a French composer and trumpeter, a member of Raymond Legrand's orchestra. After studying with Eugène Foveau at the Conservatoire de Paris, he was a professor of trumpet in the same conservatory from 1947 to 1966. Among other things, he was the teacher of Maurice André and Pierre Thibaud.
