= Max Schlossberg =

American trumpeter of Latvian origin

- Birth name: Max Schlossberg
- Born: November 5, 1873; Liepāja, Latvia
- Origin: Latvia; Berlin; New York City
- Died: September 23, 1936 (aged 62); Bethlehem, New Hampshire, U.S.
- Occupation(s): Musician, trumpeter, conductor, teacher
- Instrument: Trumpet
- Years active: 1897–1936

Max Schlossberg (5 November 1873 – 23 September 1936) was a Jewish-Baltic trumpeter, conductor, composer, and teacher. His legacy is a large number of successful trumpet students and the method book, Daily Drills and Technical Studies.

== Life ==
Max Schlossberg was born in Libau, Courland, Russian Empire, now Liepāja, Latvia in 1873 to Nathan Schlossberg and an unknown mother. He went to the Moscow Conservatory at the age of nine. He emigrated first to the United States in 1894 as his father had done previously, but returned to Riga shortly thereafter for compulsory military service which he never completed. There, Schlossberg married Jennie Lohak in 1902 before emigrating to the United States again that same year.

In 1910, Max Schlossberg moved to The Bronx in New York City for his career. He spent the remainder of his career performing and teaching there. He had three children with Jennie: Charles, Katherine Benjamin, and another daughter who would marry Harry Freistadt. In 1936, Schlossberg suffered a heart attack which prompted him to visit Bethlehem, New Hampshire, where he would later die.

== Career ==
Following his time at the Moscow Conservatory, Max Schlossberg played trumpet in Saint Petersburg. After moving to Berlin, he studied under Julius Kosleck and toured with Arthur Nikisch, Hans Richter, and Felix Weingartner. Following his return to Latvia in the 1890s, he supported himself by conducting.

Once in New York City, he performed with the New York Philharmonic for the remainder of his life, first under Gustav Mahler and finally under Arturo Toscanini. He was part of the faculty of Juilliard School. Some of his many trumpet students include Louis Davidson, Harry Glantz, Saul Caston, Renold Schilke, William Vacchiano, Mannie Klein, Bernie Glow, and James Stamp.

== Daily Drills and Technical Studies ==
Harry Freistadt compiled the manuscripts left behind by his teacher and father-in-law, Max Schlossberg, after his death. The resulting method book was Daily Drills and Technical Studies for Trumpet, first published in 1937 by J. & F. Hill before the copyright passed along to M. Baron Company in 1938. Max Schlossberg's son, Charles, edited an arrangement of the method for trombone titled Daily Drills and Technical Studies for Trombone.

The daily drills consist of 156 exercises divided into eight parts: long note drills (37 exercises), intervals (11 exercises), octave drills (10 exercises), lip drills (11 exercises), chord drills (19 exercises), scale drills (27 exercises), chromatic scale drills (13 exercises), and short études (28 exercises). The étude labeled as exercise 156, now attributed to Guillaume Balay, has been omitted from the book after the 1941 edition.
