= Rómmel =

Rómmel is a surname. Notable people with the surname include:

- Juliusz Rómmel (1881–1967), Polish military general
- Karol Rómmel (1888–1967), Polish and Russian military officer, sportsman, and horse rider

== See also ==
- Rommel (surname)
