= Jakob Bänsch =

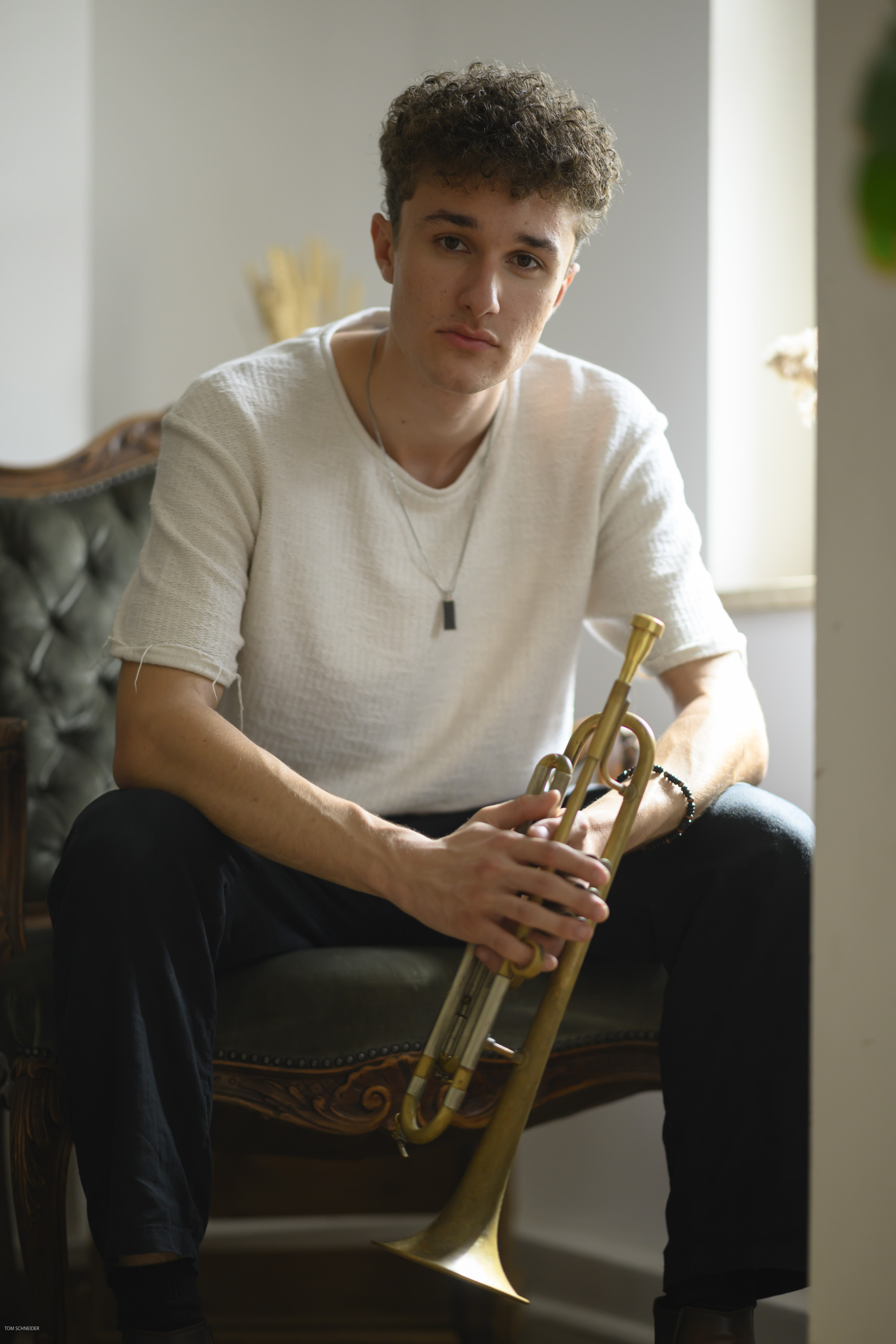

Background information
- Born: 17 January 2003 (age 23); Pforzheim, Germany
- Occupation: Musician
- Instruments: trumpet, flugelhorn, composition
- Years active: 2018 − present
- Website: www.jakobbaensch.com

Jakob Bänsch (born January 17, 2003, in Pforzheim) is a German jazz musician (trumpet, flugelhorn, composition).

== Career ==
Bänsch grew up in Tiefenbronn. As a child of professional classical musicians, he received his first piano lessons at the age of six and started playing the trumpet at the age of eight. He initially completed classical music training, played in the state youth orchestra and won, among other things, a first federal prize at Jugend musiziert. Libor Šíma encouraged his interest in jazz. In 2018 he started as a young student studying jazz trumpet at the Stuttgart University of Music and Performing Arts with Bastian Stein and was also accepted into the Baden-Württemberg State Youth Jazz Orchestra. From 2020 to 2022 he was a member of the Federal Jazz Orchestra. Since 2021 he has been studying jazz trumpet at the Cologne University of Music and Dance. He was also a member of the WDR Composers Fellowship program and the Gutenberg Jazz Collective from 2021 to 2023.

As a scholarship holder of the Elbphilharmonie Jazz Academy in Hamburg, Bänsch worked with Melissa Aldana and Theo Croker in 2021 and presented his music in the large hall of the Elbphilharmonie. He also played with Emil Mangelsdorff, Wolfgang Haffner, Billy Hart, the WDR Big Band and Nils Landgren. Bänsch also belonged to drummer Konstantin Kölmel's trio ( Hybrid ), Tobias Haug's quintet (Awakening, 2023), Mathieu Clement 's sextet (Coming Home, 2022) and Benny Greb brass band. With his Jakob Bänsch Collective he was at the studio concert at Bauer Studios in September 2020.

Bänsch performed with his quartet, among others. at festivals such as the Jazzopen Stuttgart, the Leverkusen Jazz Days or JazzBaltica. In April 2023 he released his debut album Opening on the Jazzline label.

== Prizes and awards ==
In 2019, Bänsch and his Jakob Bänsch Collective received the Young Lions Jazz Award. With his Jakob Bänsch Quartet, which at the time included Niklas Roever (piano), Jakob Obleser (bass) and Leo Asal (drums), he won second place and the soloist prize at the Young Munich Jazz Prize in 2022. In 2024, his album Opening was awarded the German Jazz Prize in the category “Debut Album of the Year”.
