= Thomas Harper (trumpeter) =

English trumpeter

- Born: May 3, 1786
- Origin: England
- Died: January 20, 1853 (aged 66)
- Occupation: Trumpet player

Thomas Harper (3 May 1786 – 20 January 1853) was an English trumpet player, playing in important concerts of the day.

== Life ==
Harper was born in Worcester. From the age of about ten he lived in London, where he studied the trumpet and the horn under Eley, and soon joined the volunteer band of the East India Company, of which his master was director. He continued in the band for about 18 years. Harper was appointed inspector of musical instruments to the company, and held this post until his death.

He played in small London theatre orchestras, until about 1806, when he was engaged as principal trumpet at the Theatre Royal, Drury Lane and at the English Opera House. In 1820 he performed at the Birmingham Triennial Music Festival. in 1821 he succeeded Hyde at the Concerts of Antient Music and at the Italian Opera. From this time he took part in important orchestral concerts and musical festivals in town and country. Harper was an active member of the Royal Society of Musicians, and was first trumpet at concerts of the Philharmonic Society until 1851. He played in the orchestra at the London funeral of Carl Maria von Weber in 1826. He regularly took part in charity concerts.

A critic in The Musical Times (volume 1, page 133) wrote: 'For purity and delicacy of tone and for wonderful facility of execution no rival has approached him. His imitation of the voice part in "Let the bright Seraphim" [from Handel's Samson] may be pronounced one of the greatest achievements in the whole range of musical executive art'.

A benefit concert was given for Harper on 15 December 1834. It was conducted by Sir George Smart and the overtures for Mendelssohn's Midsummer Night's Dream, for Beethoven's Fidelio and Weber's Jubilee were performed at The London Tavern, Bishopsgate, London.

In 1836 he published the book Instruction for the trumpet: with the use of the chromatic slide, also the Russian valve trumpet, the cornet à pistons or small stop trumpet, and the keyed bugle, in which the rudiments of music and the various scales, are clearly explained in a series of examples, preludes, lessons, solos, duets, etc. for each instrument.

Harper was taken ill at Exeter Hall in London during a rehearsal of the Sacred Harmonic Society on 20 January 1853, and died a few hours later.

Harper's eldest son, Thomas (1816–1898) succeeded his father in his appointments as principal trumpet; the second, Charles (1819–1893) was principal horn in notable orchestras; the youngest, Edmund (c.1821–1869), was a horn player, pianist and organist.
