= Victor Kolar =

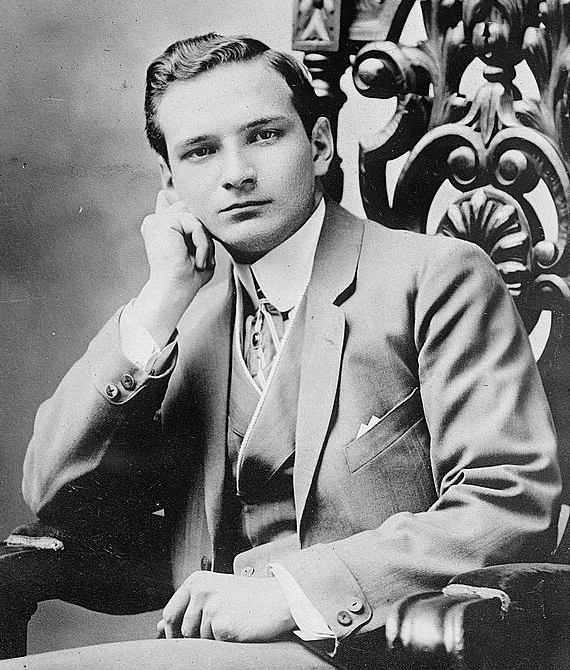
Victor Kolar

Victor Kolar (February 12, 1888 – June 16, 1957) was a Hungarian-born American composer and conductor. Kolar was born in Budapest and studied at the Prague Conservatory, where he was a pupil of Otakar Ševčík (violin) and Antonín Dvořák (composition). From 1905 until 1920 he was a violinist with the Pittsburgh Symphony and New York Symphony, joining the Detroit Symphony in 1920 as an assistant conductor. He remained with the orchestra until 1941, eventually assuming the post of principal conductor. Active as a composer as well, he wrote a symphony, some tone poems and a few orchestral suites. Of these last, his Americana won first prize in a 1914 contest sponsored by the Illinois State Teachers Association.

Kolar died in Detroit in 1957.

== Selected Compositions ==
- Hiawatha, a symphonic poem, performed by the Pittsburgh Symphony Orchestra Jan 31, 1908
- A Fairy Tale, a symphonic poem, performed by the New York Symphony Orchestra Feb 16, 1913
- Americana, Opus 20, a symphonic suite, performed by the New York Symphony Orchestra, Jan 25, 1914
- Symphony in D, performed by the New York Symphony Orchestra, Jan 28, 1916
- Slovakian Rhapsody, for orchestra, performed at the Norfolk Connecticut Music Festival on June 7, 1922

== US Citizenship ==
Victor Kolar became a US citizen March 19, 1906, in the United States District Court for the Western District of Pennsylvania.

== Family History ==
Kolar was born February 12, 1888, to Jewish parents in Budapest.
