= Akim Kozlov =

Russian trombonist

Akim Alekseïevitch Kozlov (in Russian: Аким Алексеевич Козлов) (9 September 1908 – 22 November 1992) was a Soviet trombonist.

Born in Yarygino, in the Sychyovsky Uyezd of the Smolensk Governorate of the Russian Empire, Kozlov was first solo trombone of the Saint Petersburg Philharmonic Orchestra under the direction of Yevgeny Mravinsky for more than 50 years. In 1956 he was made Meritorious Artist of the Russian Soviet Federative Socialist Republic. He was also teacher of trombone at the Saint Petersburg Conservatory (from 1946 to 1970) and that of Petrozavodsk (from 1970 to 1985).

Kozlov died in St-Petersburg in 1992.

== Bibliography ==
- Болотин С. В. (1995). Энциклопедический биографический словарь музыкантов-исполнителей на духовых инструментах (in Russian). Радуница. p. 358. ISBN 978-5-88123-007-4.
