= Tamás Velenczei =

Hungarian trumpeter (born 1960)

- Born: 1960 (age 65–66); Esztergom, Hungary
- Genre: Classical
- Occupations: Musician, professor
- Instrument: Trumpet
- Member of: Berlin Philharmonic
- Formerly of: Budapest Symphony Orchestra; Budapest Festival Orchestra

Tamás Velenczei is a Hungarian trumpeter.

== Career ==
Velenczei's primary school teacher recognized his musical talent and sent him to a music school, where he began playing trumpet. He then completed studies in Szeged and Budapest, before finishing his training at the Sir Georg Solti Foundation in Chicago and San Diego.

In 1983, he began his orchestral career with the Budapest Symphony Orchestra. He was then the principal trumpet of the Budapest Festival Orchestra from 1992 to 1998. In March 2000, he was appointed as principal trumpeter of the Berlin Philharmonic, also teaching in the Karajan Academy.

In September 2018, he was moved to second trumpet in the Berlin Philharmonic, being replaced in the principal position by Guillaume Jehl.

He is also a trumpet professor at the Franz Liszt Academy of Music.
