= Gustav Heim =

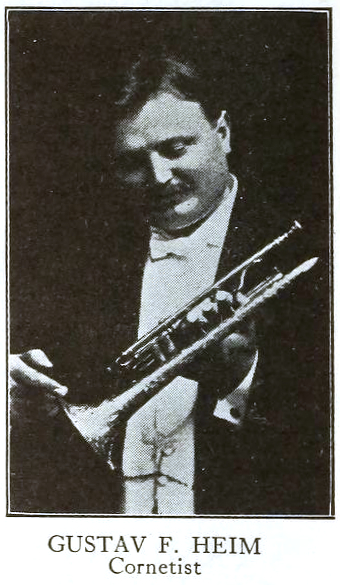
Portrait c. 1914

Gustav Friedrick Heim (8 May 1879 – 30 October 1933) was a trumpet and cornet player.

== Biography ==
Heim was born in Schleusingen, Thuringia, Germany where he studying music from his father from a young age and moved to St Louis, United States in 1904. He was principal trumpet for the Philadelphia Orchestra for the 1905–06 season and then moved to the Boston Symphony Orchestra. He left that position after a strike in 1920 and played with the Detroit Symphony Orchestra, New York Philharmonic Society, the Cleveland Orchestra, and the New York Philharmonic.
