= Armando Ghitalla =

American orchestral trumpeter

Armando Ghitalla (June 1, 1925 – 14 December 2001) was an American orchestral trumpeter. He studied at the Juilliard School, and performed in the New York City Opera, the New York City Ballet, and the Houston Symphony. He was a member of the Boston Symphony Orchestra for 28 years, and served as principal trumpet (succeeding Roger Voisin) for fifteen. He was also active as a soloist, and was the first trumpeter to record the Trumpet Concerto in E by Johann Nepomuk Hummel.

Ghitalla was born in Alpha, Illinois, and his family moved to Knoxville, Illinois, shortly after he was born. At age 8, he decided he wanted to play the trumpet. He graduated from Knoxville High School in 1942 and enrolled at Illinois Wesleyan University. He entered the U.S. Navy a year later. He played trumpet in a Navy dance band and led the port ensemble at Subic Bay, Philippines, from 1944 to 1945. After the war, he used the G.I. Bill to enroll in Juilliard School of Music in New York City.

He served on the faculties of Boston University, the New England Conservatory, the Hartt School of Music at the University of Hartford, the Tanglewood Music Center and the University of Michigan. At the time of his death, he was on the faculty of the Shepherd School of Music at Rice University.

A CD of his final recordings was released by Bridge Records in August 2007. It includes concertos by William P. Perry, Amilcare Ponchielli, Johann Melchior Molter and Oskar Böhme.

Ghitalla was a great mentor to many trumpeters including Rolf Smedvig, Wynton Marsalis, Raymond Mase and countless others. Ghitalla's characteristic way of single tonguing was called "anchor tonguing" and was very similar to the tonguing style called "K Tongue Modified" by Claude Gordon and used by Herbert L. Clarke.

Armando Ghitalla also tutored the Jazz and rock trumpeter Bill Chase.
