= Roger Voisin =

American trumpeter (1918–2008)

Background information
- Born: 26 June 1918; Angers, France
- Died: 13 February 2008 (aged 89) Newton, Massachusetts
- Genre: classical music
- Occupations: trumpeter, music teacher and editor
- Instrument: trumpet

Roger Louis Voisin (June 26, 1918 – February 13, 2008) was a French-American classical trumpeter and pedagogue who was called "one of the best-known trumpeters in this country" by The New York Times and "one of the most influential orchestral trumpet players of the mid-20th century" by The Boston Globe.

== Performing career ==
Voisin moved to the United States as a child when his father, René Voisin (1893–1952), was brought to the Boston Symphony Orchestra as fourth trumpet by Sergei Koussevitzky in 1928. He was initially a student of his father, but he later studied with the Boston Symphony's second trumpet Marcel LaFosse (1894–1969) and principal trumpet Georges Mager (1885–1950). He also studied solfege with Boston Symphony's contrabassist Gaston Dufresne.

Voisin himself joined the Boston Symphony as assistant principal trumpet in 1935 at age seventeen, and became principal trumpet in 1950. He performed in the Boston Symphony for 38 years, until 1973. During this period, he was also principal trumpet of the Boston Pops Orchestra.

He is credited with premiere performances of many major works for trumpet, including Paul Hindemith's Sonata for Trumpet and Piano (with Hindemith at the piano), and Alan Hovhaness' Prayer of St. Gregory. He also gave the US premiere of Alexander Arutiunian's Trumpet Concerto, performing it with the Boston Pops in 1966. Leroy Anderson's A Trumpeter's Lullaby was written for Voisin in 1949, and first recorded with Arthur Fiedler conducting Voisin and the Boston Pops in 1950. Leroy Anderson stated that "(A Trumpeter's Lullaby) had its beginning backstage at Symphony Hall in Boston. In addition to composing and conducting, I was arranger for the Boston Pops Orchestra for a number of years --- and after one of the concerts I was sitting talking with the conductor Arthur Fiedler and the first trumpet of the Boston Pops, Roger Voisin. Suddenly Roger Voisin asked me why I didn't write a trumpet solo for him to play with the orchestra that would be different from traditional trumpet solos which are all loud, martial or triumphant. After thinking it over, it occurred to me that I had never heard a lullaby for trumpet so I set out to write one --- with a quiet melody based on bugle notes played by the trumpet and with the rest of the orchestra playing a lullaby background."

He also participated in many early recordings and performances of both solo and orchestral works, including J. S. Bach's Brandenburg Concerto #2, Béla Bartók's Concerto for Orchestra, Aaron Copland's Quiet City, Joseph Haydn's Concerto for Trumpet in Eb, Alexander Scriabin's The Poem of Ecstasy, Georg Philipp Telemann's Concerto for Trumpet in D, and Antonio Vivaldi's Concerto for Two Trumpets in C.

== Teaching career ==
Roger Voisin was with the Boston Symphony at the inception of the Tanglewood Music Center in 1940, and continued to serve on the faculty there, coaching the orchestral winds and teaching solfège to the conducting class, until his death in 2008. He became chair of the New England Conservatory of Music (NEC) brass and percussion department in 1950 and was the primary trumpet teacher at NEC for nearly 30 years. In 1975 he became a full professor at Boston University, teaching trumpet and chairing the wind, percussion and harp department until his retirement in 1999. In 1989, Voisin donated much of his personal music library to Boston University, where it is housed in the Mugar Library's "Special Music Collections". He was awarded an honorary Doctorate from the New England Conservatory in 1991, along with legendary jazz trumpeter Dizzy Gillespie. He served on the jury of the Maurice André trumpet competition starting in 1988.

His students have performed in orchestras and taught at conservatories and universities throughout the world. A partial list follows:

George Kent (University of Rhode Island, New England Conservatory, Chorus of Westerly), Andrew Balio (Baltimore Symphony Orchestra), Gilbert Blais (Conservatoire de musique de Saguenay), Peter Chapman (Boston Symphony Orchestra), Jon Paul Danté (Paramount Brass Quintet, Singapore Symphony Orchestra), Russell Devuyst (Montreal Symphony Orchestra), Kurt Dupuis ("The President's Own" U. S. Marine Band), Anthony DiLorenzo (Center City Brass, composer, recording artist), Albert DiPietro (Longy School of Music), Joseph D. Foley (Atlantic Brass Quintet, Wellesley College, Boston University), William Harvey (Oakland East Bay Symphony), Edward Hoffman (Baltimore Symphony Orchestra, Peabody Institute), Bruce Hopkins (College of the Holy Cross), Paul Jackson (Alabama Symphony Orchestra), Robert Lemons (Eastern Connecticut State University), Louis Larouche (Québec Symphony Orchestra), Steven Matera ("The President's Own" U. S. Marine Band), Vincent Monaco (Handel and Haydn Society, Phillips Academy) Timothy Morrison (Boston Symphony Orchestra, Hollywood recording artist), Rodney Mack (Chamber Orchestra of Philadelphia), Niel Mueller (North Dakota State University), Dennis Najoom (Milwaukee Symphony Orchestra), Ramon Parcells (Detroit Symphony Orchestra), Gary Peterson (Bergen Philharmonic Orchestra, Grieg Academy), William Pfund (University of Northern Colorado, Greeley Philharmonic Orchestra), Marc Reese (Empire Brass Quintet), Betty Barber Rines (Portland Symphony Orchestra), Jay Rizzetto (California State University, San Francisco Ballet), John Schnell (Portland Symphony Orchestra), David Scott (McNeese State University), Lt Col Alan Sierichs (The United States Air Force Band), Rolf Smedvig (Empire Brass Quintet), Thomas V. Smith (New York Philharmonic, Manhattan School of Music), Edward Tarr (trumpet soloist, historian), James Thompson (Montreal Symphony Orchestra, Atlanta Symphony Orchestra, Eastman School of Music), Peter Voisin (Jacksonville Symphony Orchestra), Linn Weeda (Anchorage Symphony Orchestra, University of Alaska Anchorage), Alan Wenger (Central Missouri State University), Mike Zonshine (Honolulu Symphony) Earl Gaar (Top Brass Louisville KY).

The Roger Voisin Memorial Trumpet Competition for student trumpet performers was founded by Marc Reese and is named in Voisin's memory.

== Editing career ==
Roger Voisin was also active as an editor for International Music Company, providing over 45 editions for the company.

VOISIN EDITIONS:

- Giuseppe Aldrovandini (1671–1707), Sonata No. 1 for Two Trumpets (International Music Company)
- Giuseppe Aldrovandini (1665–1707), Sonata No. 2 for Two Trumpets (International Music Company)
- Giuseppe Aldrovandini (1665–1707), Sonata No. 3 for Two Trumpets (International Music Company)
- Alexander Arutiunian (born 1920), Concerto for Trumpet (International Music Company)
- Guillaume Balay (1871–1942), Contest Piece (International Music Company)
- Vassily Brandt (1869–1923), Concertpiece No. 1, Op. 11 (International Music Company, 1963)
- Henri Buesser (1872–1973), Concertpiece (International Music Company)
- Henri Buesser (1872–1973), Andante & Scherzo, Op. 44 (International Music Company)
- A. H. Chavanne (died 1926), 25 Characteristic Studies (International Music Company)
- Jeremiah Clarke (c. 1674–1707) (attributed to Henry Purcell), Trumpet Voluntary (International Music Company)
- Michel Corrette (1709–1795), Two Divertimenti, Op. 7. (International Music Company)
- Gaston Dufresne Develop Sight Reading (Charles Colin Music)
- Ernst August Friese, 10 Studies For Trumpet (International Music Company, 1970)
- Domenico Gabrielli (1651–1690), 6 Sonatas, Op. 11 Volumes I & II (International Music Company)
- Domenico Gabrielli (1651–1690), Sonata for Two Trumpets (International Music Company)
- André Gedalge (1856–1926), Contest Piece (International Music Company)
- Reinhold Glière, Concerto (International Music Company)
- Johann Christoph Graupner (1683–1760), Concerto No. 1 in D (International Music Company)
- George Frideric Handel (1685–1759), Concerto in G min. (International Music Company)
- George Frideric Handel (1685–1759) Concerto in F minor (International Music Company)
- George Frideric Handel (1685–1759), Sonata No. 3 (International Music Company)
- Joseph Haydn (1732–1809), Concerto in E flat maj. Edited & provided with Cadenzas by Roger Voisin (International Music Company)
- Georges Hüe (1858–1948), Contest Piece (International Music Company)
- Johann Nepomuk Hummel (1778–1837), Concerto for Trumpet (International Music Company)
- Giuseppe Maria Jacchini (c. 1663 – 1727), Sonata (International Music Company)
- Aram Khachaturian (1903–1978), Four Dances from the ballet "Gayane" (International Music Company)
- Georg Kopprasch, 60 Studies Volumes I & II (International Music Company)
- Francesco Manfredini (1684–1762), Concerto in C Major for Two Trumpets (International Music Company)
- Georges Marty (1860–1908), Chorale (International Music Company)
- Orchestral Excerpts from Classical and Modern Works Volumes VI, VII, VIII, IX, X (International Music Company)
- Ernst Paudert (born c. 1899, date of death unknown), Six Duets (International Music Company)
- Ernst Paudert (born c. 1899, date of death unknown), 24 Studies (International Music Company)
- Giocomo Perti (1661–1756), Serenade (International Music Company)
- Henry Purcell, Sonata for Trumpet in Bb or C (International Music Company)
- Domenico Scarlatti, Sonata No. 17 (International Music Company)
- Matthias Spiegler (1595 – c. 1634), Canzone I for Trumpet, Bass Trombone & Piano (International Music Company)
- Matthias Spiegler (1595 – c. 1634), Canzone II for 2 Trumpets, Bass Trombone & Piano (International Music Company)
- John Stanley, (1713–1786) Concerto i C Major (Füssl-Voisin) (International Music Company)
- Giuseppe Tartini (1692–1770), Adagio and Allegro for two trumpets (Orvid-Voisin) (International Music Company)
- Georg Philipp Telemann (1681–1767), Concerto in D major (International Music Company)
- Georg Philipp Telemann (1681–1767), Concerto in B flat major (orig. in D for Clarino) (Füssl-Voisin)(International Music Company)
- Georg Philipp Telemann (1681–1767), Concerto for Two Trumpets (International Music Company)
- Francis Thomé (1850–1909), Fantasy (International Music Company)
- Giuseppe Torelli (1658–1709), Concerto in C major (International Music Company)
- Roger Voisin (1918–2008), Album of 12 Classical Pieces (Beethoven, Grieg, Handel, Mendelssohn, Mozart, Schubert, Weber, et al.) (International Music Company)
- Roger Voisin (1918–2008), 24 Daily Exercises (International Music Company)
- Roger Voisin (1918–2008), 11 Studies (International Music Company, 1963)
- Wilhelm Wurm (1826–1906), 40 Studies (International Music Company)

== Discography ==
- The Modern Age of Brass (Kapp "Unicorn" monaural recording)
  - Hindemith, "Morgenmusik"
  - Dahl, Music for Brass Instruments
  - Berezowsky, Brass Suite
  - Sanders, Quintet in B flat
- Roger Voisin / Music for Trumpet & Orchestra (Vol 1) (Kapp "Unicorn" recording)
  - Haydn, Concerto for Trumpet and Orchestra in E flat
  - Antonio Vivaldi, Concerto for Two Trumpets and Orchestra in C
  - Henry Purcell, Tune and Air for Trumpet and Orchestra in D
  - Henry Purcell, Voluntary for Two Trumpets in C
  - Henry Purcell, Voluntary for Two Trumpets in C
  - Henry Purcell, Trumpet Voluntary in D
  - Henry Purcell, Sonata for Trumpet and Strings in D
- Roger Voisin & John Rhea Trumpets / Trumpet Impressions 2
  - Girolamo Fantini, Chiamata no. 3
  - Henry Purcell, Symphony From The Fairy Queen
  - Alessandro Stradella, Sonata For Trumpet and Two String Orchestras
  - Jean-Baptiste Lully, Carousel Music
  - Girolamo Fantini, Chiamata no. 6
  - Claudio Monteverdi, Sinfonia da Guerra
  - Johann Caspar Ferdinand Fischer, Le Journal de Printemps: Suite no. 8
  - Christian Pezold, Sonata no. 30 "Hora Decima"
  - John Stanley, Trumpet Tune
  - Henry Purcell, The Yorkshire Feast Song: Symphony
  - Henry Purcell, The Duke of Gloucester's Birthday Ode: Overture
  - Henry Purcell, Trumpet Overture From "The Indian Queen"
  - Henry Purcell, Trumpet Tune And Air "The Cebell"
  - C. P. E. Bach, Marche For Three Trumpets And Timpani "Fur Die Arche"
- Roger Voisin: The Baroque Trumpet - Disc One
  - Antonio Vivaldi, Concerto in E flat major for two Trumpets and Strings
  - Manfredini, Concerto in D major for Two Trumpets and Orchestra
  - Biber, Sonata a Six for B flat Trumpet and Strings
  - G. P. Telemann, Concerto in D major for Trumpet in D, Two Oboes, and Continuo
  - John Stanley, Trumpet Tune
  - Henry Purcell, Yorkshire Feast
  - Henry Purcell, Duke of Gloucester's Birthday Ode: Overture
  - Henry Purcell, Indian Queen: Trumpet Overture
  - Henry Purcell, The Cebell
  - C. P. E. Bach, March for Three Trumpets and Timpani
  - Legrenzi, Sonata La Buscha
  - G. P. Telemann, Concerto in D for Trumpet, Strings and Continuo
- Roger Voisin: The Baroque Trumpet - Disc Two
  - J. E. Altenburg, Concerto for Seven Trumpets and Timpani
  - Henry Purcell, Symphony from "The Fairy Queen"
  - Alessandro Stradella, Sonata for Trumpet and Two String Orchestras
  - Claudio Monteverdi, Sinfonia da Guerra
  - J. K. F. Fischer, Le Journal de Printemps" (Suite No. 8)
  - Alessandro Stradella, Sinfonia to II Barcheggio
  - Domenico Scarlatti, Sinfonia No. 2
  - Fux, Serenada
- Music of Jubilee - Johann Sebastian Bach: E. Power Biggs, organ; Richard Burgin, Conductor; Columbia Chamber Orchestra; Recorded in Symphony Hall, Boston; Solo Trumpets: Roger Voisin and Marcel LaFosse
  - Sinfonia to Cantata No. 29
  - Chorale Prelude: In Dulci Jubilo
  - Chorale Prelude: Rejoice, Beloved Christians
  - Concerto and Chorale "Alleluia" - Cantata No. 142
  - Chorale: Jesu Joy of Man's Desiring - Cantata No. 147
  - Chorale Prelude: Fantasia on "In Dulci Jubilo"
  - Chorale: Now Christ Doth End in Triumph - Christmas Oratorio
  - Duet: My Spirit be Joyful - Easter Cantata No. 146
  - Sheep May Safely Graze - Birthday Cantata No. 208
  - Chorale: Now Thank We All Our God - Cantata No. 79
  - Sonata to Cantata No. 182
  - Chorale: Awake Thou Wintry Earth - Cantata No. 129
  - Fugue in G Minor ("Little")
  - Passacaglia and Fugue in C Minor
  - Fugue in C Major ("Fanfare")
  - Toccata and Fugue in D Minor
- The Old South Brass, Organ and Timpani; Frederick MacArthur, Organ; Roger Voisin, Conductor
  - Chucherbutty Fanfare
  - Edward Elgar Pomp and Circumstance Military March No. 1, Opus 39 - Arr. George Faxon
  - George Faxon Adagio from Miniature Suite For String Quartet
  - George Faxon Fanfare No. 2
  - Karg-Elert Praise The Lord With Drums And Cymbals, Opus 101
  - McKinley Hymn Tune Fantasie On "St. Clement"
  - Perry Christos Patterakis
  - John Philip Sousa The Stars & Stripes Forever - Arr. George Faxon
  - Tchaikovsky 1812 Overture - Arr. George Faxon
  - The Star-spangled Banner (National Anthem) - Arr. George Faxon
  - Traditional Auld Lang Syne - Arr. George Faxon
  - Vierne Carillon De Westminster from Pièces De Fantaisie, Troisième Suite, Opus 54 - Arr. George Faxon
  - Vierne March Triomphale Centenaire De Napoléon I, Opus 16
  - Richard Wagner The Ride Of The Valkyries - Arr. George Faxon
- Koussevitzky Conducts Bach (Boston Symphony Orchestra)
  - The Six Brandenburg Concertos
  - The Four Orchestral Suites
- Bernstein, conducts Stravinsky and Ravel
  - Igor Stravinsky, "Histoire du Soldat"
  - Igor Stravinsky, Octet for Wind Instruments
  - Maurice Ravel, Piano Concerto in G
- Pierre Monteux Conducts the BSO: Debussy; Liszt; Scriabin
  - Franz Liszt, Les Préludes (Symphonic Poem No. 3); Pierre Monteux/Boston SO
  - Alexander Scriabin, Le Poeme De L'extase, Op. 54; Roger Voisin
  - Havanaise, Op. 83 - Leonid Kogan
  - Claude Debussy La Mer - Pierre Monteux/Boston SO
- Saint-Saëns: Symphony No.3/Debussy: La Mer/Ibert: Escales, Boston Symphony, Charles Munch

Voisin can also be seen and heard playing several works, most notably Charles Ives's The Unanswered Question, in Aaron Copland's WNET series Music in the Twenties
