= Pierre Vignal =

French painter

Pierre Vignal (1855-1925) was a French painter. He became a Knight of the Legion of Honour in 1912.

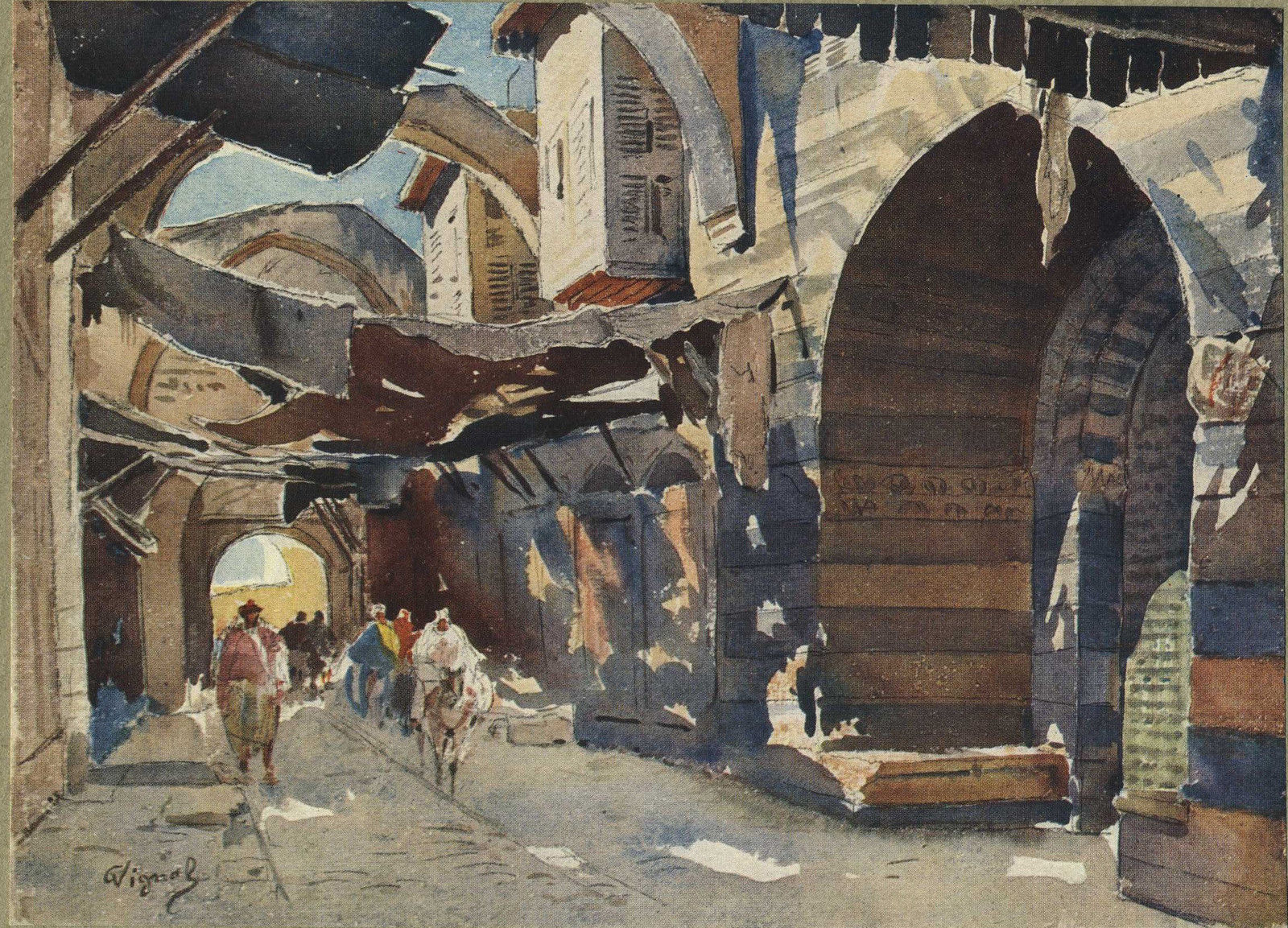
Vue du bazar d'Alep. 1922.
