= Harry Glantz =

Harry "Hersch" Glantz (January 1, 1896 – December 18, 1982) was a trumpet player.

== Biography ==
Born in Ukraine, Glantz moved to the United States in 1901 at the age of five. He came from a musical family and began playing violin and cello at an early age, but eventually switched to trumpet. He had a number of teachers, including Jack Borodkin, Max Schlossberg, Max Bleyer, Christian Rodenkirchen, and Gustav Heim.

Glantz was the principal trumpeter for the New York Philharmonic, the NBC Symphony Orchestra under Arturo Toscanini, the Philadelphia Orchestra and the San Francisco Symphony. He also taught at the University of Miami. His notable pupils included Bernie Glow, Frank Kaderabek, and Larry Lake.

He died of a heart condition in Bay Harbor, Florida on December 18, 1982.
