= Marie Speziale =

American trumpeter

Marie Speziale (born c. 1945) is an American trumpeter and the first female trumpet player to play in a major symphony orchestra. She started in the Cincinnati Symphony when she was 19 years old. She served in the orchestra in Cincinnati from 1964 to 1996. She was later professor of music at Rice University's Shepherd School of Music.

== Career ==
Marie Speziale began her love of music as a child. In 1958 she appeared on the Dave Garroway Today Show She graduated from Chamberlain High School in Tampa, Florida in 1960, where she was first chair, student conductor and a soloist. Speziale studied at College-Conservatory of Music on scholarship. While at the College-Conservatory of Music in Cincinnati, she studied with Eugene Blee. She graduated in 1964 with a Bachelor of Music degree. After graduating in 1964, she won the position of Associate Principal Trumpet in the Cincinnati Symphony, and held this position until 1996.

In 1964, she became an adjunct professor at the University of Cincinnati College-Conservatory of Music. In 1972, she left the university and became an adjunct professor at Miami University of Ohio. In 1979 Speziale returned to teach at the University of Cincinnati College-Conservatory as an adjunct associate professor until 2002. In 1999, she was appointed as professor of music with tenure at Indiana University until 2003. She was appointed professor of trumpet and chair of the brass department at Rice University's Shepherd School of Music in 2002, and she retired from this position as professor emerita in 2013.

== Selected publications ==
- Speziale "Transcription of Dukas Fanfare from "La Peri". (2002).
- Marie Speziale "Transcription of Handel's Concerto Grosso VI, opus 6." (1982).

== Honors, awards and fellowships ==
- First Prize - Trumpet Ensemble Division, National Trumpet Competition. (March, 2003).
- Fellowships, New World Symphony. (Sept., 2000).
- Orchestral Appointments, Chicago Civic Orchestra. (Sept., 2003).
- Leading Woman in the Arts, Greater Cincinnati Coalition of Women's Organizations. (1997).
