= Adolph Herseth =

American trumpet player

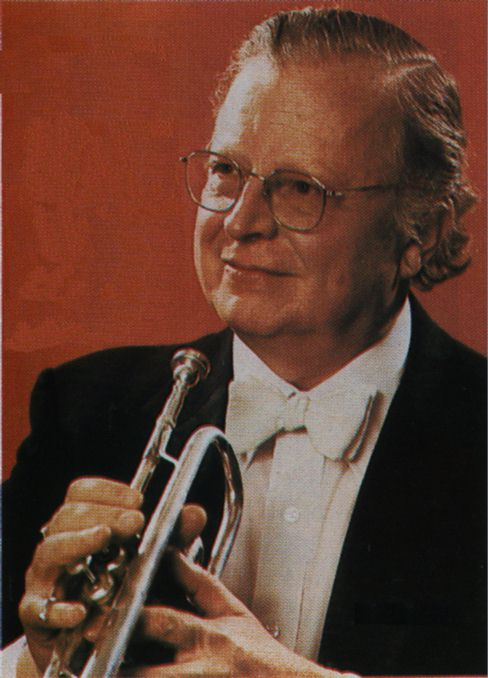

Background information
- Born: Adolph Sylvester Herseth; July 25, 1921; Lake Park, Minnesota
- Died: April 13, 2013 (aged 91) Oak Park, Illinois
- Genre: Orchestral
- Occupation: Principal trumpet of the Chicago Symphony Orchestra
- Instruments: Trumpet, cornet
- Formerly of: Chicago Symphony Orchestra

Adolph Sylvester "Bud" Herseth (July 25, 1921 – April 13, 2013) was principal trumpet in the Chicago Symphony Orchestra from 1948 until 2001, and served as principal trumpet emeritus from 2001 until his retirement in 2004.

== Life and career ==
Herseth was born in Lake Park, Minnesota. His father was the band director at Bertha High School in Bertha, Minnesota where Herseth attended, where Herseth got his first trumpet. He then went on to learn from James Greco during the summer of 1937 at the first high school state band camp that Gerald Prescott held at the University of Minnesota. Prescott had heard him play in a regional competition and invited him to play solo cornet in his summer band. Herseth graduated from Luther College in Iowa with a degree in mathematics prior to serving as a musician with the U.S. Navy during World War II. After the war, Herseth studied with Boston Symphony Orchestra trumpeters Marcel LaFosse (second trumpet) and Georges Mager (principal trumpet) at the New England Conservatory of Music.

In a book by Louis Davidson, Herseth lists a few of the players he admired and whose playing most influenced his. They include Louis Davidson, Harry Glantz, and Maurice André. Herseth also admired the Swedish tenor Jussi Björling and Frank Sinatra.

His ancestors came from Norway. In 1977 he visited Norway to see the places where his relatives lived in Ringsaker Municipality in Hedmark County.

Herseth was widely regarded as one of the greatest orchestral trumpeters of his generation.

As the principal trumpet of the Chicago Symphony for 53 years, Herseth performed under Bruno Walter, George Szell, Eugene Ormandy, Leonard Bernstein, James Levine, Claudio Abbado, and many other prominent orchestral conductors. His tenure in the orchestra spanned the time of 6 different CSO music directors - Artur Rodziński (1947–1948), Rafael Kubelik (1950–1953), Fritz Reiner (1953–1962), Jean Martinon (1963–1968), Sir Georg Solti (1969–1991), and Daniel Barenboim (1991–2006).

Herseth's tenure as principal trumpet spanned the Reiner years, during which the orchestra rose to prominence, due in part to the powerful and precise sound of its brass section. As explained by the Telegraph in London on September 18, 2009, "The orchestra's rise to fame began with the great Fritz Reiner in the Fifties, but it was during the 22-year reign of the fierce Hungarian Georg Solti that the orchestra became the brawny yet subtle precision instrument that it is today, famed especially for its noble and stupendously powerful brass sound." A Smithsonian profile of Herseth, published September 1, 1994, offered this description: "The Chicago has long been recognized as one of the world's great orchestras, and Adolph Sylvester Herseth has had a major role in the evolution of its distinctive sound." As described in the Chicago Sun-Times, July 22, 2001, "For decades Herseth's rich, golden tone and powerful yet expressive playing were a cornerstone of the fabled 'Chicago Sound.'" That brass sound drew worldwide attention to the CSO, and propelled the great American orchestra's reputation around the globe." According to an entry on the Chicago History Museum's online history of the city, the CSO's "unmistakable sound and high standard of performance helped define the Chicago Symphony Orchestra as a world class institution. It also made Chicago an international center for the study of brass instrument performance."

Regular concert-goers knew him not only by his golden sound, but also by sight; as long-time Chicago Tribune critic John von Rhein wrote in his farewell piece, "He was the man whose face would turn radish-red when he was scaling the trumpet stratosphere or tossing off a rapid scale passage. Where he found the huge volume of air needed to make a notoriously recalcitrant brass instrument soar like that, Herseth wasn't saying. That was part of the Bud Mystique."

Herseth retired in 2001. The position he occupied is now named after him - The Adolph Herseth Principal Trumpet Chair. He died at his home in Oak Park on April 13, 2013, at the age of 91.
