= Georges Mager =

French musician (1885–1950)

Georges C. Mager (1885–1950) was a French musician, and principal trumpet with the Boston Symphony Orchestra from 1919 until his death in 1950. He was a renowned trumpeter in Paris before the First World War, playing at the Paris Opera, Concerts Lamoureux, and the Concerts of the Society of the Conservatory. He also had an alternate career as a singer in the duo with his wife Claire, a well-known soprano, and had hoped for an operatic career. After serving in the French army during the war he came to America as flugelhorn soloist with the Garde Republicaine Band and was engaged to play in the Boston Symphony, first as a violist, since there was no vacancy for trumpet, sharing a stand with Arthur Fiedler. He assumed the first trumpet position in 1920. Trained in France, he was a student of J. Mellet (a student of Jean-Baptiste Arban) at the Paris Conservatory. He was an advocate of use of the C trumpet as an orchestral instrument and had great influence on its development and acceptance in America, working most notably with Vincent Bach.

He also was the first trumpeter in America to play Bach's Brandenburg Concerto in the original high tessitura. Mager was on the faculty of the New England Conservatory, and was a teacher to some of the most influential trumpeters of the mid-twentieth century, including Adolph Herseth (who became principal trumpet of the Chicago Symphony Orchestra), Roger Voisin (who replaced Mager as principal trumpet of the Boston Symphony Orchestra in 1950, Bernard Adelstein (who became principal trumpet of the Cleveland Orchestra), Irving Sarin (who became principal trumpet of the Pittsburgh Symphony Orchestra and respected teacher in his own right), and Renold Schilke (who joined the trumpet section of the Chicago Symphony Orchestra and later became an important trumpet maker). He was also teacher to jazz trumpeter Leon Merian.

Mager also made important contributions to the trumpet literature through several editions of French solo works, including Guillaume Balay's Petite Piece Concertante, Henri Dallier's Fete Joyeuse, and Georges Hue's Solo De Concert. These are found in "Nine Solos de Concert" published by Southern Music Co (formerly Andraud).
