= John Rommel =

American musician

John Rommel (born 1958) is an American classical trumpeter and professor at the Indiana University Jacobs School of Music.

== Life ==
Prior to his hiring at Indiana, Rommel was principal trumpet of the Louisville Orchestra from 1988 until 1996. His numerous solo and chamber music performances include recent performances of J. S. Bach's Brandenburg Concerto No. 2, David Gillingham's When Speaks the Signal Trumpet Tone, Anthony Plog's Double Concerto For Two Trumpets and Chamber Orchestra, and György Ligeti's Mysteries of the Macabre. He has also performed with the Indianapolis Symphony, the Cincinnati Symphony, the Nashville Symphony, Summit Brass, Saint Louis Brass Quintet, and the Nashville Contemporary Brass Quintet.

In addition to his performance experience, Rommel has recorded more than 30 compositions with the Louisville Orchestra by many of the leading composers of the twentieth century and has extensive commercial recording experience in Indianapolis and in Nashville, Tennessee. He was a clinician for the Vincent Bach Corporation, a division of the Selmer Company, and has studied with former IU trumpet professors William Adam and Louis Davidson, former Louisville Orchestra principal Leon Rapier, and former Chicago Symphony trumpeters Vincent Cichowicz and William Scarlett.
