= William Vacchiano =

American trumpeter and educator (1912–2005)

William Vacchiano (May 23, 1912 – September 19, 2005) was a trumpeter and trumpet instructor.

Originally from Portland, Maine, Vacchiano studied trumpet at age 12. At 14 years old, he was playing in the Portland Symphony. For five years (1930–1935), he studied under Max Schlossberg at the latter's studio in The Bronx. He joined the New York Philharmonic in 1935 as third/assistant principal trumpet and appointed principal trumpet in 1942 by Bruno Walter. He taught at the Juilliard School for 67 years (1935–2002). He was also a professor at the Mannes College of Music from 1937 to 1983 and the Manhattan School of Music from 1935 to 2002. His students included Wynton Marsalis, Philip Smith, Charles Schlueter, Gerard Schwarz, Manny Laureano, and Miles Davis.

His obituary in The New York Times quoted him saying:

"This, to me, is happiness. When I feel bad I go down to the studio in my house, I pick up my horn and I'm in seventh heaven. That's what music should be like."
