= Maurice André =

French trumpeter (1933–2012)

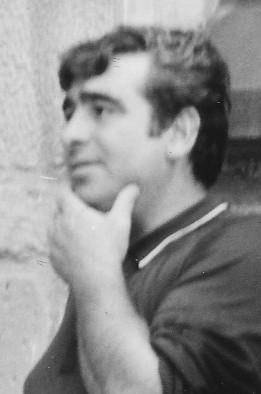
Maurice André in 1969

Maurice André (21 May 1933 – 25 February 2012) was a French trumpeter, active in the classical music field.

He was professor of trumpet at the Conservatoire National Supérieur de Musique in Paris where he introduced the teaching of the piccolo trumpet including the Baroque repertoire on trumpet. André has inspired many innovations on his instrument and he contributed to the popularization of the trumpet.

== Biography ==
André was born in Alès in the Cévennes, into a mining family. He himself worked in the mine from the age of 14 to the age of 18. His father was an amateur musician; André studied trumpet with a friend of his father, who suggested that André be sent to the conservatory. In order to gain free admission to the conservatory, he joined a military band. After only six months at the conservatory, he won his first prize.

At the conservatory, André's professor, Raymond Sabarich, reprimanded him for not having worked hard enough and told him to return when he could excel in his playing. A few weeks later, he returned to play all fourteen etudes found in the back of Arban's book to a very high standard. Sabarich later said that "it was then that Maurice Andre became Maurice Andre." Maurice André won the Geneva International Music Competition in 1955, together with Theo Mertens, and the ARD International Music Competition in Munich in 1963. He was made an honorary member of the Delta chapter of Phi Mu Alpha Sinfonia at Ithaca College in New York in 1970.

André rose to international prominence in the 1960s and 1970s with a series of recordings of baroque works on piccolo trumpet for Erato and other labels. He also performed many transcriptions of works for oboe, flute, and even voice and string instruments. André had over 300 audio recordings to his name, from the mid-1950s to his death.

André had three children: Lionel (1959–1988), trumpeter and music teacher; Nicolas, who plays the trumpet; and Béatrice, who plays the oboe. All three performed with their father in concert. He also made several recordings with his brother Raymond (b. 1941).

One of André's students, Guy Touvron, wrote a biography entitled Maurice André: Une trompette pour la renommée (Maurice André: A Trumpet for Fame), which was published in 2003.

André spent the last few years of his life in retirement in southern France. He died at the age of 78 in a hospital in Bayonne on 25 February 2012. He is buried in the cemetery of the village of Saint-André-Capcèze (in the Lozère).
