= Brass quintet repertoire =

Set of available musical works for brass quintet

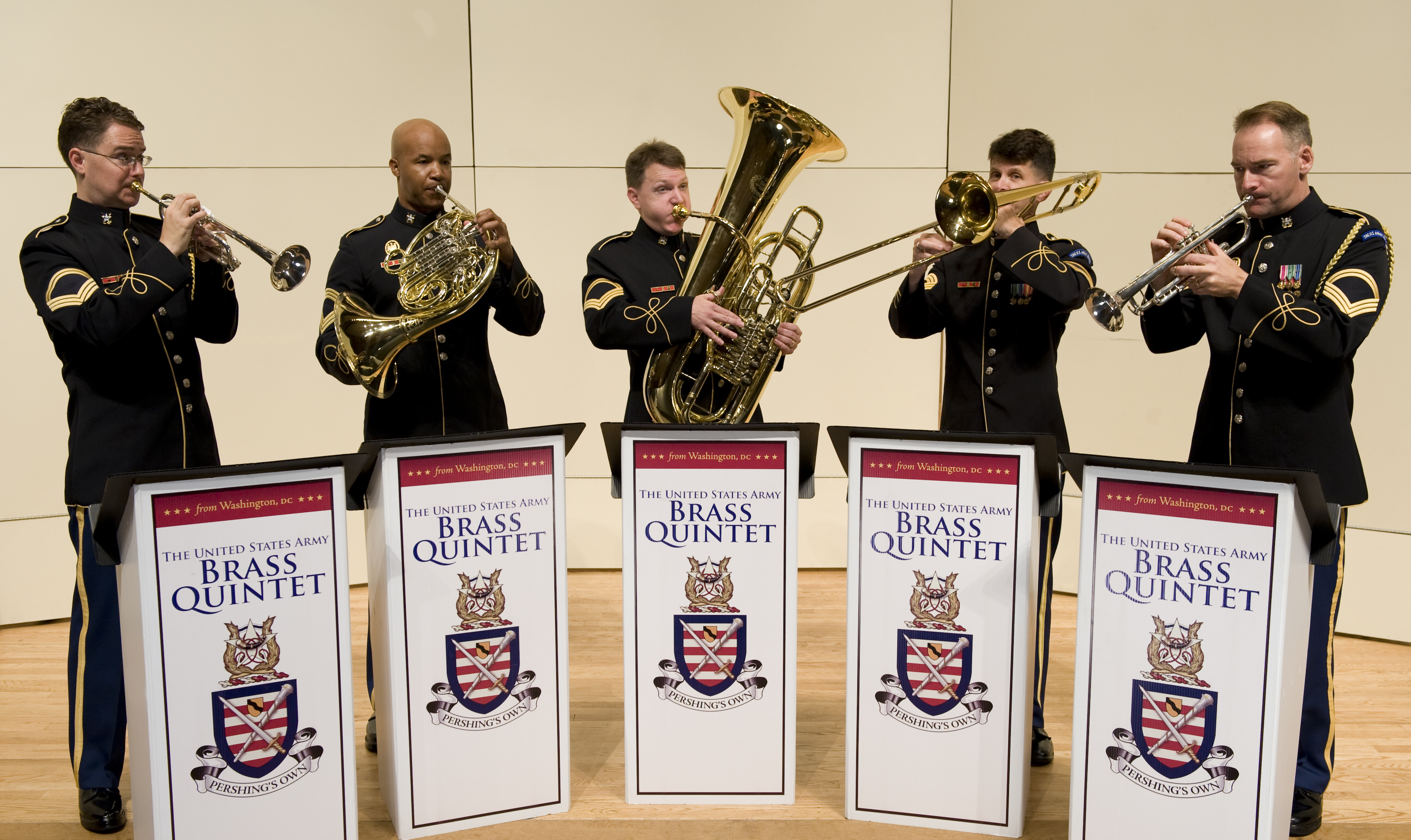
The United States Army Brass Quintet

Along with a concerted effort to commission new works for brass quintet since 1967, the bulk of any brass quintet's repertoire consists of arrangements of pre-existing music.

Victor Ewald's four brass quintets are the first serious attempts at establishing a repertoire for the ensemble, though they do not stand up to typical string quartet repertoire of the same and preceding eras. The Chicago and New York Brass Quintets made sustained efforts to commission new works, and much of the original repertoire for brass quintet from the mid-20th century derives from their groundbreaking work. In the 1960s, the mantle of creating a repertoire for brass quintet was taken up by the American Brass Quintet and the New York Brass Quintet, with both groups essentially establishing the brass quintet as a part of the chamber music field. Notably, only two brass quintets have ever been awarded the Walter W. Naumburg Chamber Music Award, considered by many to be the highest achievement in brass chamber music: The Empire Brass Quintet in 1976 and The Saturday Brass Quintet in 1990.

But it was Canadian Brass that developed the pragmatic approach to repertoire allowed the ensemble to reach a wider audience. They developed a two prong approach to performance, developing a masterpiece approach to repertoire that popularized the brass quintet as an ensemble into what was essentially a "pops" ensemble. Meanwhile, the ensemble has been pursuing an aggressive 45-year commissioning schedule. Though this ensemble is seldom recognized for its achievement in the contemporary sphere, they have created well over 100 newly composed works for brass quintet, though few of the Canadian Brass commissions of original compositions have taken hold in the repertoire of other brass quintets.

It is generally agreed amongst brass players that the tuba is the dominant choice for brass quintets, with the ability to play smaller instruments such as bass trombone or baritone for certain repertoire such as Renaissance. The American Brass Quintet has always used bass trombone instead of tuba, and their extensive commissioning has validated use of this instrumentation. It is not uncommon for composers to write interchangeable parts for tuba and bass trombone to enable both types of quintets to perform their work.

== Brass quintet repertoire ==
- Bruce Adolphe, Triskelion
- Efraín Amaya Brass Quintet
- Gilbert Amy, Relais
- Malcolm Arnold, Quintet for Brass No. 1, Op. 73
- Malcolm Arnold, Quintet for Brass No. 2, Op. 132
- Alexander Arutiunian, Armenian Scenes
- Daniel Asia, Brass Quintet
- Milton Babbitt, Counterparts
- Jan Bach, Laudes
- Jan Bach, Rounds and Dances
- Jan Bach, Triptych
- Jason Bahr, Divergence
- Jason Bahr, Eagle Fanfare
- Drew Baker, Kiln for brass quintet & piano
- Leonardo Balada, Mosaics
- Stephen Barber, Multiples Points on View of a Fanfare
- Stephen Barber, Gone Is the River
- Edward Barnes, Variations for Brass Quintet
- Robert Beaser, Brass Quintet
- Irwin Bazelon, Brass Quintet
- Jean-François Bellon, Douze Quintettes de Cuivres
- Luciano Berio, Call
- Derek Bourgeois, Sonata for Brass Quintet
- Henry Brant, The Fourth Millennium
- Robert Russell Bennett, Arabesque
- Leonard Bernstein, Dance Suite for Brass Quintet
- Larry Bitensky, For Then and Now for brass quintet
- William Bolcom, Quintet
- Darijan Božič, Kriki (The Cries)
- Eugène Bozza, Bis
- Eugène Bozza, Sonatine for 2 C trumpets, 1 horn, 1 trombone, and 1 tuba.
- Alvin Brehm, Quintet for Brass
- Howard J. Buss, Concord, Chromatic Fantasy, Sonic Fables (brass quintet & one percussion), Sonata K.380/Scarlatti, D., Tribute to Stephen Foster
- Vitaly Buyanovsky, Ballet Suite
- Morley Calvert, An Occasional Suite
- Morley Calvert, Suite from the Monteregian Hills
- Elliott Carter, Brass Quintet
- Elliott Carter, A Fantasy about Purcell's "Fantasia upon One Note"
- John Cheetham, Brass Menagerie
- John Cheetham, Scherzo
- Jack Cooper, Scenes for Brass
- Enrique Crespo, Spiritual Waltz
- Enrique Crespo, Suite Americana No. 1
- Georges Delerue, Vitrail
- Carl Della Peruti, Sounding for Brass Quintet
- Robert Dennis, Blackbird Variations
- Anthony DiLorenzo, Fire Dance
- Lucia Dlugoszewski, Angels of the Inmost Heaven
- Jacob Druckman, Other Voices
- Jack Curtis Dubowsky, Brass Quintet No. 1
- Jack Curtis Dubowsky, Due North
- Jack End, 3 Salutations
- Donald Erb, Three Pieces for Brass Quintet
- Donald Erb, The St. Valentine's Day Brass Quintet
- Alvin Etler, Quintet
- Alvin Etler, Sonic Sequence
- Victor Ewald, Quintet no. 1 in B♭ minor (Op. 5)
- Victor Ewald, Quintet no. 2 in E♭ major (Op. 6)'
- Victor Ewald, Quintet no. 3 in D♭ major (Op. 7)
- Victor Ewald, Quintet no. 4 in A♭ major (Op. 8)
- Eric Ewazen, Colchester Fantasy
- Eric Ewazen, Frost Fire
- Eric Ewazen, Grand Valley Fanfare
- Eric Ewazen, A Western Fanfare
- Brian Fennelly, Brass Quintet No. 3 (Velvet and Spice)
- Brian Fennelly, Locking Horns-Brass Quintet No. 2
- Brian Fennelly, Prelude And Elegy For Brass Quintet
- Myron Fink, A Suite of Antiques
- Malcolm Forsyth, Golyardes' Grounde
- Lukas Foss, Night Music for John Lennon In Memory of December 8, 1980, for brass quintet and orchestra
- Sean Friar, Kindly Reply for brass quintet (2016)
- Kenneth Fuchs, Fire, Ice, and Summer Bronze
- Jack Gallagher, Toccata for Brass Quintet
- Jack Gallagher, Celebration and Reflection
- Elliot Goldenthal, Brass Quintet No. 2
- Daniel Grabois, Zen Monkey
- Edward Gregson, Quintet for Brass
- Yalil Guerra, Carnaval for brass quintet
- John Halle, Softshoe
- Piers Hellawell, Sound Carvings from the Bell Foundry
- Anders Hillborg, Brass Quintet
- Alun Hoddinott, Ritornelli 2
- Vagn Holmboe, Quintet No 1, Op. 79
- Vagn Holmboe, Quintet No 2, Op. 136
- Eres Holz, Vier Schatten
- Joseph Horovitz, Music Hall Suite
- Eric Hudes, Pentaptych
- John Huggler, Quintet
- Jason Huffman, Christmas Tree
- Karel Husa, Divertimento for brass quintet
- Karel Husa, Landscapes
- Steve Jablonsky, Streets of Laredo (2018)
- Steve Jablonsky, Danny Boy (2019)
- Steve Jablonsky, Memorial Day (2019)
- Gordon Jacob, Changing Moods
- David A. Jaffe, Descent into Flatland
- Vincent Jockin, Quintette de Cuivres
- Phillip Johnston, Sleeping Beauty
- Collier Jones, Four Movements for Five Brass
- Collier Jones, Suite for Brass Quintet, "The Roadrunner"
- Michael Kamen, Quintet
- Jan Koetsier, Brass Quintet, Opus 65
- Sonny Kompanek, Killer Tango
- Peter Korn, Prelude and Scherzo
- Bernhard Krol, Promenade Parisienne, Op. 78
- Michel Leclerc, Par monts et par vaux
- Tania León, Saoko
- Edwin London, Brass Quintet
- Raymond Luedeke, Brass Quintet – Complexities and Contradictions
- Witold Lutoslawski, Fanfare for CUBE
- Witold Lutoslawski, Mini Overture
- Peter Machajdík Arching Sentiments for brass quintet
- Trygve Madsen, Brass Quintet, Op. 120
- Frederik Magle, Intermezzo for Brass Quintet
- Frederik Magle, Lys på din vej (Light on your path) for brass quintet and organ
- David Maslanka, Arise!
- Grace-Evangeline Mason, As Bronze
- Ludwig Maurer, Four Songs for Brass
- Ludwig Maurer, Twelve Little Pieces for Brass Quintet
- Francis McBeth, Four Frescos
- Kevin McKee, Escape
- Kevin McKee, Vuelta del Fuego
- John Melby, 91 Plus 5 for brass quintet and computer
- Jerome Moross, Sonatina for Brass Quintet
- Robert Nagel, This Old Man March
- Lior Navok, Gitz & Spitz Suite
- Clint Needham, Abstract Mosaics
- Per Nørgård, Vision
- Leroy Osmon, "Introduction and Allegro"
- Hermeto Pascoal, Timbrando
- Robert Paterson, Dash
- Robert Paterson, Shine
- Vincent Persichetti, Parable for Brass Quintet
- Tom Pierson, Brass Quintet
- Anthony Plog, 4 Sketches for Brass Quintet (Quintet #1)
- Anthony Plog, Mini-Suite for Brass Quintet
- Anthony Plog, Mosaics for Brass Quintet (Quintet No. 2)
- Anthony Plog, Animal Ditties VII for Brass Quintet
- André Previn, Four Outings for Brass
- Howard Quilling, Four Pieces for Five Brass
- Belinda Reynolds, Weave
- Verne Reynolds, Suite
- Peter Robles, Transcendent Tones, Fractured Forms
- Ned Rorem, Diversions
- Steven Christopher Sacco, Quintet for Brass
- David Sampson, Distant Voices
- David Sampson, Entrance
- David Sampson, Morning Music
- David Sampson, Strata (originally Quintet 99)
- Peter Schickele, Hornsmoke: a horse opera
- Adam Schoenberg, Reflecting Light
- William Schmidt, Variations on a Negro Folksong
- William Schuman, American Hymn: variations on an original melody'
- Elliott Schwartz, Three Movements
- Ralph Shapey, Brass Quintet
- Ralph Shapey, Fanfares
- Alexander Shchetynsky, On the Eve
- Faye-Ellen Silverman, Kalends
- Faye-Ellen Silverman, Quantum Quintet
- Reynold Simpson, Brass Quintet
- David Snow, Dance Movements
- Juan María Solare, Heroes of a Forgotten Kingdom
- Juan María Solare, Handwritten Runes
- Juan María Solare, Affirmation
- Juan María Solare, Hymn to Commitment
- Andrew Sorg, Mental Disorders
- Andrew Sorg, Voices In Da Fan
- Andrew Sorg, Prelude and Fugue in E minor
- Andrew Sorg, Existential Crisis
- Robert Starer, Evanescence
- Raymond Stewart, OK Chorale
- William Susman, The Heavens Above
- Elias Tannenbaum, Patterns and Improvisations for BQ and Tape
- Elias Tannenbaum, Structures
- Michael Tilson Thomas, Street Song
- Virgil Thomson, Family Portrait
- Bramwell Tovey, Manhattan Music, for brass quintet and orchestra or wind ensemble
- Bramwell Tovey, Santa Barbara Sonata
- George Tsontakis, Brass Quintet
- George Tsontakis, Hansel
- Joseph Turrin, Fanfare for Five for brass quintet
- Joseph Turrin, Soundscapes for brass quintet
- Joseph Turrin, Solarium for brass quartet and piano
- Joseph Turrin, Sketches for brass quintet
- Vladimir Ussachevsky, Anniversary Variations
- Vladimir Ussachevsky, Dialogues and Contrasts for Brass Quintet and Tape
- George Walker, Music for Brass (Sacred and Profane)
- Dan Welcher, Brass Quintet
- Charles Whittenberg, Triptych
- Alec Wilder, Jazz Suite for brass quintet
- Natalie Williams, Land of Ages: fanfare for brass quintet.
- Charles Wuorinen, Brass Quintet
- Norman Yamada, Mundane Dissatisfactions
- Carolyn Yarnell, Slade
- John Zorn, Pulcinella
- Ramon Zupko, Masques for brass quintet and piano
