= David Sampson (composer) =

American contemporary classical composer (born 1951)

David C. Sampson (born January 26, 1951) is an American contemporary classical composer.

== Biography ==
David C. Sampson was born in Charlottesville, Virginia. After starting trumpet lessons, he studied at the National Music Camp at Interlochen, Michigan, studying trumpet and composition. Sampson earned a B.A. in music from the Curtis Institute of Music, where he studied trumpet with Gilbert Johnson. He continued his studies with Donald Lybbert in composition at Hunter College, earning an M.F.A. in composition, followed by a D.M.A. at the Manhattan School of Music, where he studied composition with John Corigliano and trumpet with Robert Nagel and Raymond Mase. He also attended the Ecole d’Art Americaines at Fontainebleau as a composition student of Robert Levin. Additionally, he has studied with Karel Husa and Henri Dutilleux in composition and Gerard Schwarz on trumpet.

Sampson has received major grants from the National Endowment for the Arts, American Academy of Arts and Letters, Chamber Music America, Barlow Endowment, New Jersey State Council on the Arts, Jerome Foundation, Mary Flagler Cary Charitable Trust, and the Geraldine R. Dodge Foundation.

== Selected commissioned works ==
- The War Prayer (1984–85) for soloists, chorus, and orchestra. Commissioned by the National Endowment for the Arts and premiered by Princeton Pro Musica.
- Hommage JFK (1995) for 14 brass and three percussion. Commissioned by the National Symphony Orchestra.
- Monument (1996–97). Commissioned by the Barlow Foundation for the Akron and Memphis Symphony Orchestras.
- Turns (1994) for violoncello and orchestra. Commissioned by the Bergen Foundation and cellist Paul Tobias and premiered by the New Jersey Symphony Orchestra.
- Triptych (1991) for trumpet and orchestra. Commissioned by the International Trumpet Guild. Premiered by Raymond Mase at the Aspen Music Festival and with the American Composers Orchestra at Carnegie Hall.
- Dectet (1998). Commissioned by the Chicago Chamber Musicians.
- Strata (1999). Commissioned by the National Endowment for the Arts and the American Brass Quintet.
- Jersey Rain (2001). Commissioned by the NEA and the Geraldine R. Dodge Foundation and premiered by Harmonium and Masterworks Choruses and the Colonial Symphony.
- Breathing Lessons (2006) for saxophone quartet. Commissioned by Chamber Music America for the Amherst Saxophone Quartet.
- Short Stories (1994). Commissioned by Chamber Music America and the Pew Charitable Trust.
- Elements (2002) for string quartet. Commissioned by the Elements String Quartet.
- Double Back (2015) for trumpet, trombone, and wind ensemble. Premiered by Rex Richardson, Joseph Alessi, and the VCU Symphonic Wind Ensemble, Terry Austin, director.
- Simple Lives (1990). Commissioned by the Colonial Symphony.
- Duncan Trio (2002) for brass trio. Commissioned by Dorothy Duncan.
- Breakaway (2004) for two trumpets and electronics. Commissioned by Raymond Mase and Kevin Cobb.
- Smoky Mountain Fanfare (2010) for brass quintet. Commissioned by the Smoky Mountain Brass Quintet.
- Like the Risen Grain (2011) for mixed chorus, brass quintet, timpani, and organ. Commissioned by Bucknell University.
- Legend (2011) for wind ensemble. Commissioned by Texas A&M Commerce University.
- Still (2013) for brass quintet. Commissioned by the Gaudete Brass Quintet.
- Mock Attack! (2014) for clarinet. Commissioned by the Montclair Art Museum.
- Memories To Keep Awhile (2014) for trumpet/flugelhorn, violin, violoncello, and piano. Commissioned by David Elton and the Australian Festival of Chamber Music.
- Random Acts (2018) for trumpet and piano. Commissioned by a consortium of 15 trumpets players organized by Kevin Cobb.

== Discography ==
- Monument (Summit Records DCD237), 1999.Triptych, Simple Lives, Hommage JFK, Three Portraits, Monument. Czech Philharmonic Chamber Orchestra, Alan Balter, conductor; Raymond Mase, trumpet;Scott Mendoker, tuba.
- Dectet (Troy 780), 2005. Serenade for flügelhorn and string orchestra, Raymond Mase, flügelhorn; Czech Philharmonic Chamber Orchestra. Sonata Forty for horn and piano, Scott Brubaker, horn; Ron Levy, piano. Strata for brass quintet, The American Brass Quintet. Dectet for string quartet, wind quintet, and piano, Paul Polivnick, conductor, Wihan Quartet; Afflatus Wind Quintet; Richard Ormrod, piano.
- Chesapeake (Summit Records DCD639), 2014. Breakaway for two trumpets and electronics, Raymond Mase, Kevin Cobb, trumpets; Powell Trio for trombone, marimba, and piano, Michael Powell, trombone; She-e Wu, marimba; Steven Beck, piano. Three Sides for trumpet/flügelhorn, vibraphone and piano, Raymond Mase, trumpet/flügelhorn; James Baker, vibraphone; Steven Beck, piano. Just Keep Moving for horn, bass trombone, marimba and piano, David Wakefield, horn;John D. Rojak, bass trombone; She-e Wu, marimba; Martha Locker, piano. Chesapeake for brass quintet, American Brass Quintet.
- Notes from Faraway Places (Summit Records DCD681), 2016. Fanfare for Canterbury Cathedral for double brass quintet, American Brass Quintet; Quo Vadis Brass Quintet. Tenebrae for trumpet and organ, Raymond Mase, trumpet; Trent Johnson, organ. Without Warning for piano, Steven Beck, piano. Mock Attack for solo clarinet, Andy Lamy, clarinet. A Family Portrait for brass quintet, Philadelphia Brass. Evensong for tuba and electronics, Scott Mendoker, tuba. The Death of Macbeth for solo timpani and percussion quartet, James Musto, Tom Murphy, Nancy Pontius, David Stockton, Jeff Willet, percussion. Notes from Faraway Places, Suite 3 for two trumpets, Donald Batchelder, Raymond Mase, trumpets. Smoky Mountain Fanfare for brass quintet, Philadelphia Brass. Changewater for eight trombones, Richard Clark, Richard Harris, Tom Hutchinson, Chris Olness, Michael Powell, Tim Albright, Kenneth Finn, tenor trombones; John Rojak, bass trombone. Inamere for twelve trumpets.

== Recordings featuring compositions by David Sampson ==
- American Tribute (Summit Records (DCD 127), 1991. Reflections On A Dance, Summit Brass.
- Divertimento - Music For Winds (Bay Cities BCD1030), 1991. In Memoriam: W.E.S.,Aspen Wind Quintet.
- New American Brass (Summit Records, DCD133), 1992. Morning Music, American Brass Quintet.
- Trumpet in Our Time (Summit Records, DCD-148), 1995.The Mysteries Remain, Solo, Raymond Mase.
- Five (Channel Classics CCS 9496), 1995. Morning Music, Meridian Arts Ensemble.
- Premier! (Summit Records DCD 187),1996. Distant Voices, American Brass Quintet.
- Atemwege - Breath Paths (Bayer-Records, CAD800876), 1999. Solo, Lutz Mandler, flügelhorn.
- A Choral Bouquet (Rutgers - The State University of New Jersey), 1999. Shout For Joy!, Rutgers University Chorus, John Floreen, conductor.
- First Glimpses of Sunlight (Summit Records DCD233), 1999. Short Stories, Dorian Wind Quintet.
- Sing We Merrily (Rutgers - The State University of New Jersey), 2001. Of The Father’s Love Begotten (arr.), Rutgers University Chorus, John Floreen, conductor.
- Raritonality (Mark Masters MCD6199), 2006. Moving Parts, Rutgers Wind Ensemble, William Berz, conductor.
- Stargazer (Equilibrium EQL 83), 2007. Passage, Alan Siebert, trumpet.
- Jewels (Summit Records DCD 484), 2007. Entrance, American Brass Quintet.
- Outberzt (Mark Masters MCD8652), 2009. Outburst, Rutgers Wind Ensemble, William Berz, conductor.
- WASABE 2009 (Mark Records MCD8471), 2009. Outburst, North Texas Wind Symphony.
- Archetypes (GIA WindWorks CD-820), 2009. Moving Parts, North Texas Wind Symphony, Eugene Corporon, conductor.
- Brass Trios (Albany Records, Troy 1222), 2010. Duncan Trio, University of Maryland Brass Trio.
- State of the Art: The ABQ at 50 (Summit Records, DCD 553), 2010. Chants and Flourishes, American Brass Quintet.
- Breathing Lessons: Music for Saxophone Quartet (Naxos 8.559627), 2011. Breathing Lessons, New Hudson Saxophone Quartet.
- Chicago Moves (Cedille Records, CDR 90000), 2012. Chicago Moves.Gaudete Brass. Hi-Fi News album choice, June 2013.
- New American Masters, Volume 5 (Albany Records Troy1481), 2014. Undercurrents Redux, Palisades Virtuosi.
- Sevenfive: The Corigliano Effect (Cedille Records CDR 90000 169), 2017. Entrance, Still, Gaudete Brass.

== Compositions by instrumentation ==
=== Orchestral ===
- The Notes Fit To Print for orchestra, 1980
- Three Portraits for tuba and chamber orchestra, 1990
- Simple Lives for orchestra, 1990
- Triptych for trumpet and orchestra, 1991
- Turns for violoncello and orchestra, 1994
- Monument for orchestra, 1996–97
- Serenade for flügelhorn and string orchestra, 1998
- Jersey Rain for baritone, chorus and orchestra, 2001
- Concerto for oboe and string orchestra, 2003
- New Providence Overture for orchestra, 2003
- Concerto for soprano saxophone and string orchestra, 2004
- Black River Concerto for violin, percussion and orchestra, 2007

=== Mixed ensemble ===
- Permit Me Voyage for viola and piano, 1978
- Passage for viola and flügelhorn, 1979
- Flashback for percussion quartet, 1980
- Sonata Forty for horn and piano, 1991
- Three Arguments for unaccompanied violoncello, 1993
- Dectet for oboe, clarinet, horn, bassoon, piano, two violins, viola, violoncello, and double bass, 1998
- Sketches for violin and marimba, 2007
- The Powell Trio for tenor trombone, marimba, and piano, 2009
- Three Sides for trumpet, vibraphone, and piano, 2009
- Just Keep Moving for horn, bass trombone, marimba, and piano, 2010
- Undercurrents Redux for flute, clarinet, and piano, 2010
- Counterwork for trumpet, marimba, and piano, 2010
- Flare for violoncello, marimba and string orchestra, 2012
- Death of Macbeth for percussion quintet, 2013
- Memories to Keep Awhile for trumpet/flügelhorn, violin, violoncello, and piano, 2014
- Skeleton at the Feast for flute, viola, and guitar, 2017

=== Choral ===
- O Blessed Face for flute, harp, organ, and mixed choir, 1978
- Peace for mixed choir a cappella, 1981
- Behold How Good and Lovely It Is for mixed choir and organ, 1984
- Shout for Joy! for brass quartet, organ, and mixed choir, 1992
- Of the Father’s Love Begotten for mixed choir and organ, 1993
- Praise! for mixed choir and organ, 1994
- Replogle "Amens" for mixed choir, 2010
- For the Last Time for viola, piano, and mixed choir, 2016

=== Choral with orchestra ===
- The War Prayer for six vocal soloists, mixed choir, and chamber orchestra, 1984-5
- Jersey Rain for baritone solo, mixed choir, and orchestra, 2001

=== Songs and song cycles ===
- The Skein for soprano and piano, 1973
- The Birthday for soprano, oboe, violoncello, and harp, 1982
- Four Scenes and an Epilogue for soprano, string quartet, and harp, 1984
- Three Christmas Scenes for flute/piccolo, oboe/English horn, violoncello, piano, and mixed choir, 1987
- The Song My Paddle Sings for mixed choir a cappella, 1987
- The Figured Wheel for soprano, oboe/English horn, bassoon, and piano, 1988
- "Our Father's Road", A Cantata for New Sweden for narrator, soprano, oboe/English horn, violoncello, piano, and percussion, 1989
- Voices of Our Youth for flute, viola, violoncello, harp, and mixed choir, 1997
- Two Settings of the Serenity Prayer for mixed choir and organ, 2007
- To Hold Us for mixed choir and piano, 2008
- Like the Risen Grain for mixed choir, brass quintet, timpani, and organ, 2011

=== Piano ===
- Cuttings, 1980
- Without Warning, 1992

=== Trumpet(s)/flügelhorn ===
- The Mysteries Remain for trumpet and organ, 1978
- Passage for viola and flügelhorn, 1979
- Litany of Breath for trumpet, 1980
- Trumpet Descants on Festive Hymns for trumpet, 1981
- Flight for three trumpets, 1982
- Winter Ceremony for two trumpets and percussion, 198.
- Trumpet Descants on Christmas Hymns for trumpet, 1983
- Triptych for trumpet and orchestra, 1991
- Solo for unaccompanied flügelhorn, 1991
- Serenade for flügelhorn and string orchestra, 1998
- Notes from Faraway Places - three suites of concert etudes for one or two trumpets, 2001
- Breakaway for two trumpets and digital audio, 2004
- Serenade for trumpet and wind ensemble, 2006
- Morning Pages for unaccompanied trumpet, 2007
- Three Sides for trumpet, vibraphone and piano, 2009
- Inamere for 12 trumpets, 2011
- Memories to Keep Awhile for trumpet/flügelhorn, violin, violoncello, and piano, 2014
- The Wind Came In Red for trumpet and piano, 2015
- Double Back for solo trumpet, trombone, and wind ensemble, 2015
- Random Acts for trumpet and piano, 2018

=== Tuba ===
- Three Portraits for tuba and chamber orchestra, 1990
- Emma’s Dance for tuba and piano, 1994
- Evensong for tuba and digital audio, 1995
- Serenata for tuba and wind ensemble, 2005
- Sightline for tuba and piano, 2017

=== Wind ensemble ===
- Moving Parts for wind ensemble, 2003
- Serenata for tuba and wind ensemble, 2005
- Serenade for trumpet and wind ensemble, 2006
- Outburst for wind ensemble, 2006
- Millbrook Suite for wind ensemble, 2008
- Legend for wind ensemble, 2011
- Future Relics for baritone saxophone, marimba/xylophone, and wind ensemble, 2013
- Double Back for solo trumpet, trombone, and wind ensemble, 2015

=== Brass ensemble ===
- Fanfare for Canterbury Cathedral for double brass quintet, 1978
- Points for brass octet and percussion, 1983; rev. 1987
- Reflections On a Dance for 14 brass and two percussion, 1988
- Westfield Fanfare for 13 brass and three percussion, 1993
- Hommage JFK for 14 brass and three percussion, 1995
- Edge for 13 brass, snare drum, and timpani, 2008
- Changewater Suite for eight trombones, 2008
- Crosscurrents for 15 brass and two percussion, 2009
- Chants and Flourishes for double brass quintet, 2009
- Inamere for twelve trumpets, 2011

=== Brass quintet ===
- Echoes and Other Ghosts, 1986
- Morning Music, 1986
- Distant Voices, 1990
- Strata, 1999
- Entrance/Exit, 2003
- A Family Portrait, 2008
- Chesapeake, 2010
- Smoky Mountain Fanfare, 2010
- Chicago Moves, 2011
- Still, 2013

=== Brass trio ===
- Duncan Trio, 1980

=== Chamber winds ===
- The Endless Instant for clarinet and percussion, 1980
- In Memoriam: W.E.S. for woodwind quintet, 1981
- Nine Times Mime for oboe, harp, and percussion, 1983
- Four Winds for wind quartet, 1991
- Short Stories for woodwind quintet, 1994

=== String orchestra ===
- Serenade for flügelhorn and string orchestra, 1998
- Concerto for Dancers and String Orchestra for dancers and string orchestra, 2000
- Concerto for soprano saxophone and string orchestra, 2004

=== Single instrument ===
- Litany of Breath for unaccompanied trumpet, 1980
- Solo for unaccompanied flugelhorn, 1991
- Notes From Faraway Places for unaccompanied trumpet(s), 2001
- Undercurrents for unaccompanied flute, 2007
- Morning Pages for unaccompanied trumpet, 2007

=== String quartet ===
- Elements, 2002
- Breathing Lessons, 2006

=== Concerto ===
- Triptych for trumpet and orchestra, 1991
- Turns for violoncello and orchestras, 1994
- Serenade for flügelhorn and string orchestra, 1998
- Concerto for Dancers and String Orchestra for dancers and string orchestra, 2000
- Concerto for oboe and string orchestra, 2003
- Concerto for soprano saxophone and string orchestra, 2004
- Black River Concerto for violin, percussion, and orchestra, 2007
- Future Relics for baritone saxophone, marimba/xylophone, and wind ensemble, 2013
- Double Back for trumpet, trombone, and wind ensemble, 2015
