= Brass quintet =

Musical ensemble

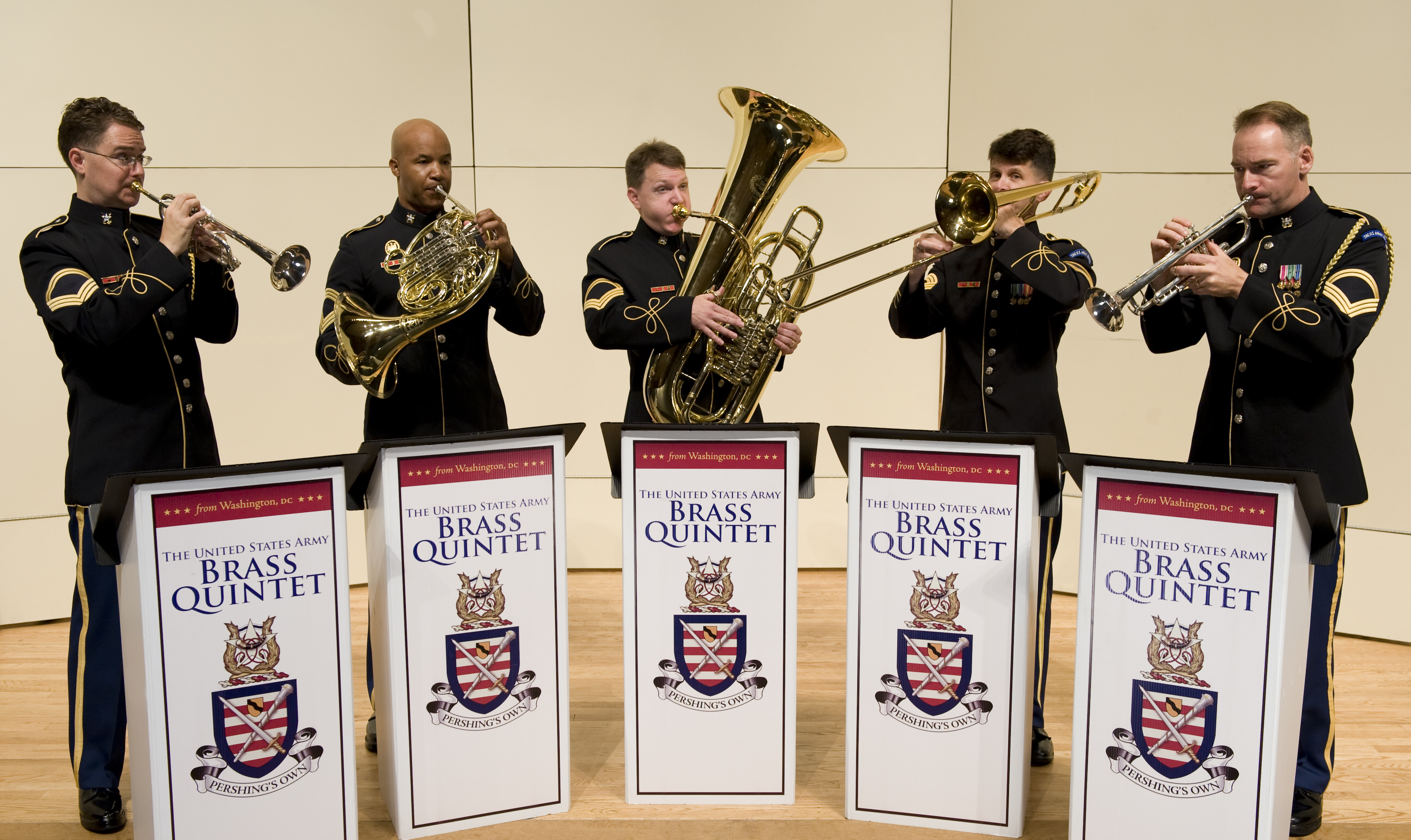
The United States Army Brass Quintet

A brass quintet is a five-piece musical ensemble composed of brass instruments. The instrumentation for a brass quintet typically includes two trumpets or cornets, one French horn, one trombone or euphonium/baritone horn, and one tuba or bass trombone. The two instrumentations of the brass quintet that are currently in use are the quintet of two trumpets, horn, trombone, and tuba; and the quintet of two trumpets, horn, trombone, and bass trombone. Musicians in a brass quintet may often play multiple instruments. Trumpet players, for instance, may double on piccolo trumpets and flugelhorns. There can be variation in instrumentation depending on the type of quintet. In some quintets, the horn is replaced by an additional trombone. Euphonium may also be substituted for the trombone part. While the tuba is considered a standard, the range and style of many pieces lend themselves to being played with bass trombone as the lowest-pitched instrument. Additionally, some pieces call for the use of percussion instruments, particularly the snare drum, tambourine, or timpani.

== Early history ==
The earliest brass chamber music was written in the mid to late 1800s and coincided with the invention of brass instruments that could play chromatically. The Distin family formed one of the first brass quintets in 1833, touring Europe and the United States to promote a new family of brass instruments called saxhorns. In Paris, composers began creating chamber music as groups of amateur brass musicians began to form. One example of these early works from Paris was a series of twelve brass quintets composed in 1850 by Jean-François Bellon. The instrumentation of these early brass chamber works varied, but frequently included some combination of cornet, horn, trombone, and ophicleide. Early brass chamber music also developed in Russia due to the patronage of Alexander III, who was a cornet player and frequently hosted performances of brass chamber music in the palace. German musicians living in Russia played a prominent role in composing and performing brass chamber music during this period. Cornet soloist Wilhelm Wurm served as Alexander III's private cornet instructor, organized the first brass ensemble concert in the court in 1867, and composed seventy-six brass quartets. Other prominent early brass chamber music pieces include 6 brass quartets by Wilhelm Ramsøe, 13 brass quintets by Ludwig Wilhelm Maurer (published 1881), two brass quartets by Vassily Brandt, and a brass sextet by Oskar Böhme (1907). The Russian composer Victor Ewald composed four brass quintets between 1888 and 1912, which remain some of the most frequently performed pieces in the brass quintet repertoire. Brass septets were a common performing ensemble in Finland and Sweden at the turn of the twentieth century. Jean Sibelius composed several pieces for the ensemble, including "Tiera" in 1898.

In the late 19th and early 20th centuries, the size and instrumentation of brass chamber music were still not standardized. While some compositions for brass quintet were written during this period, brass quartets were more prevalent. Beginning in the 1870s, German cornet soloists Julius Kosleck and Theodor Hoch, as well as a growing number of professional musicians, toured the United States promoting brass quartet music, while the music publisher Carl Fischer encouraged and disseminated compositions and arrangements of music for brass quartets. Robert King, a Boston-based euphonium player, started his own publishing company in 1940 with the goal of increasing the stature of the brass quartet to be equal to that of the string quartet. He soon expanded to publish and promote brass chamber music of varying sizes and instrumentation, and was a primary source for brass chamber music until he retired in 1991. In 1951, British trumpet player Philip Jones formed the Philip Jones Brass Ensemble as a brass quartet, touring extensively and promoting brass chamber music. The ensemble eventually developed a regular group of ten musicians, but frequently performed music of varying instrumentation, including brass quintets.

== Development of the modern brass quintet ==
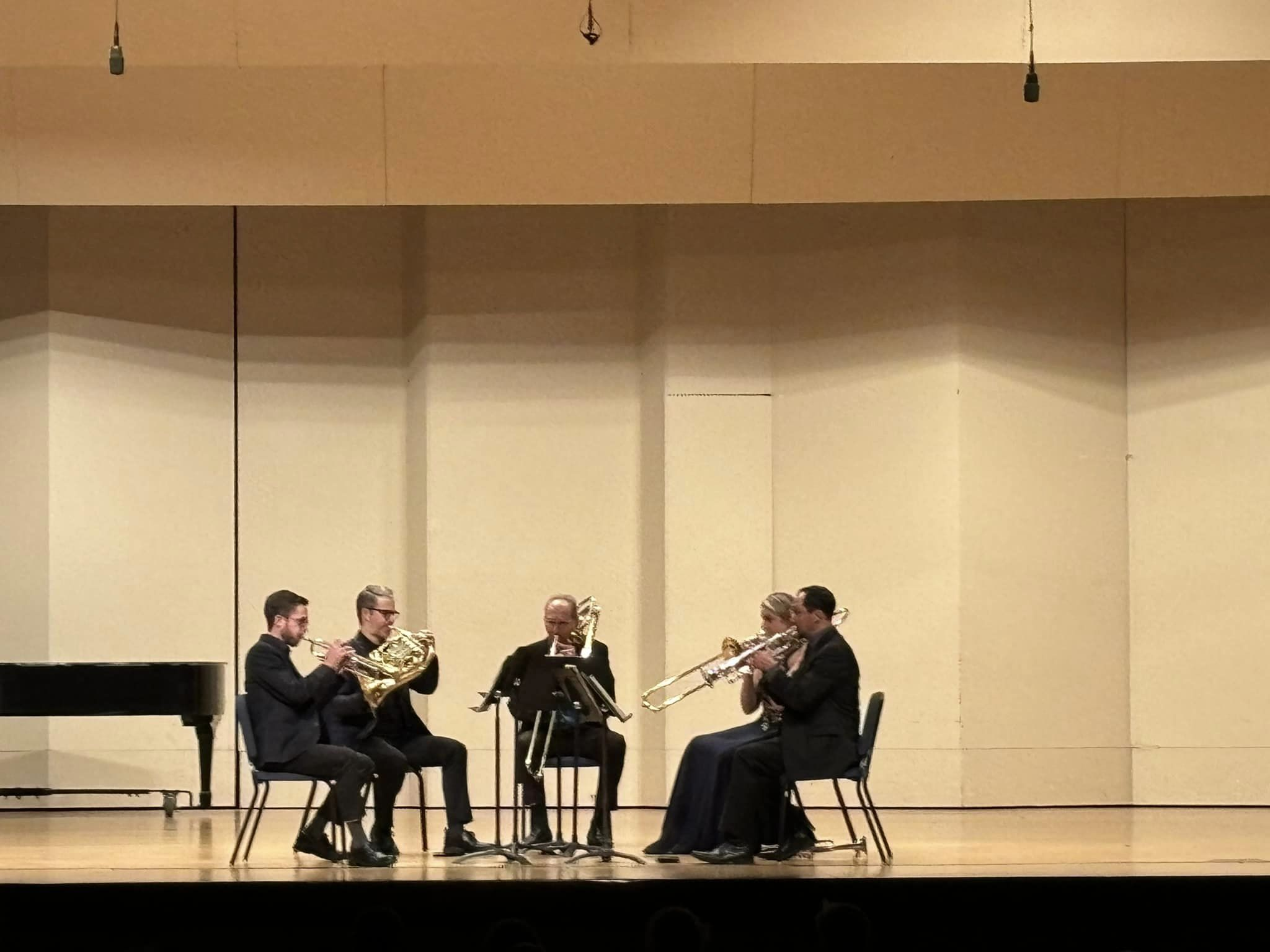
American Brass Quintet at the 2024 International Trombone Festival

The brass quintet in its modern form first appeared in New York City after World War II. In 1954, Robert Nagel and Harvey Phillips reorganized the earlier New York Brass Ensemble into the New York Brass Quintet, which is the earliest consistently performing brass quintet in its most common form: two trumpets, one horn, one trombone, and one tuba. The largest distinction between this ensemble and the more popular brass quartets of the time was the inclusion of the tuba. The NYBQ relied heavily in its early years on Robert King transcriptions of music from the Renaissance and Baroque, along with a limited repertoire of previously written music, such as "Music for Brass Instruments" (1944) by Ingolf Dahl and "Sonatine" (1951) by Eugène Bozza. The New York Brass Quintet's educational focus increased the ensemble's profile, allowing the ensemble to commission new works for brass quintet by prominent composers such as Malcolm Arnold and Gunther Schuller (1961). The quintet disbanded in 1985. Another New York-based brass quintet is the American Brass Quintet, founded in 1960 and still in existence today. The ensemble distinguished itself from the New York Brass Quintet by substituting the tuba for a bass trombone, allowing the quintet to perform early music with a tone that is more historically accurate. The Annapolis Brass Quintet was the first brass quintet in the United States to have its members perform with the group full-time. The quintet frequently performed throughout North America, Europe, and Asia from its founding in 1971 until the ensemble disbanded in 1993.

However, it was with the founding of Canadian Brass in 1970 that the brass quintet became a popular entertainment attraction in the chamber music world. Canadian Brass established both the style and popularity of the quintet medium throughout the world, having performed more than five thousand concerts, selling more than 500,000 quintet music books, and creating a library of over 600 compositions and arrangements for brass quintet. They continue to be one of the most popular and recognizable contemporary brass quintets. The brass quintet has accrued a sizable amount of literature for an ensemble that was only firmly established halfway through the 20th century. Notable contributions to the literature include many commissions by modern ensembles such as the American Brass Quintet and transcriptions by other ensembles such as the Canadian Brass. More specifically, Dr. Arthur Frackenpohl wrote many arrangements and transcriptions for the Canadian Brass for over 20 years and played a pivotal role in producing repertoire not only for the Canadian Brass but for all Brass Quintets.

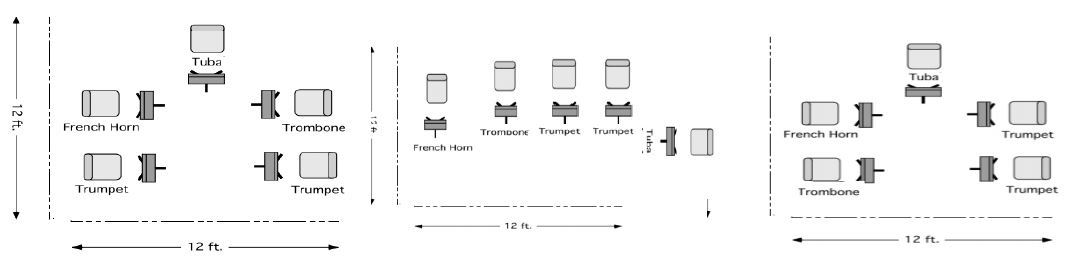
The first and third setup are the most common among many brass quintets while the Empire Brass primarily uses the second setup.

== International Brass Quintet Festival ==
In 1980 the International Brass Quintet Festival and Symposium was established and at the time, was the only one to exist. This festival, similar to many of the festivals we see for Orchestra or Band, featured music forums, masterclasses, competitions, in-residence programs and free concerts. This festival was held between 1980 through 1992 at the Village of Cross Keys in Baltimore, Maryland. During this time many world-renowned brass quintets made appearances including the Budapest Brass Quintet, Le Concert Arban from Paris, Ensemble Prisma from Vienna, and the Theo Martens Brass Quintet. In 1989 history was made as the Berlin Brass Quintet from East Berlin shared the stage with the Brandenburg Quintet from West Berlin before the Berlin Wall had officially fallen.

== Examples of notable brass quintets ==
- American Brass Quintet
- Annapolis Brass Quintet
- Atlantic Brass Quintet
- Canadian Brass
- Chestnut Brass Company
- Chicago Brass Quintet
- Dallas Brass
- Empire Brass
- Meridian Arts Ensemble
- New York Brass Quintet
- Presidio Brass
- Smoky Mountain Brass Quintet
- Zephyr Brass Collective

== See also ==
- Brass quintet repertoire
