= Dick Garcia =

American jazz guitarist

- Birth name: Richard Joseph Garcia
- Born: May 11, 1931 (age 93); New York City, U.S.
- Genres: Jazz
- Occupation: Musician
- Instrument: Guitar

Dick Garcia (born May 31, 1931) is an American jazz guitarist.

== Career ==
Garcia began to play the guitar aged nine. In 1950, he was a member of Tony Scott's quartet. From 1952, he worked with George Shearing, Charlie Parker, Joe Roland, Milt Buckner, Johnny Glasel, Lenny Hambro, Aaron Sachs, and Bobby Scott. He recorded with Shearing in the late 1950s and early 1960s, then with Kai Winding.

== Discography ==
=== As leader ===
- A Message from Garcia (Dawn, 1956)
- The Fourmost Guitars with Jimmy Raney, Chuck Wayne, Joe Puma (ABC-Paramount, 1957)

=== As sideman ===
- When Lights Are Low (MGM, 1955)
- I Hear Music (MGM, 1955)
- Lullaby of Birdland (MGM, 1957)
- Taking a Chance On Love (MGM, 1958)
- Jazz Conceptions (MGM, 1958)
- Satin Latin (MGM, 1959)
- A Jazz Date with George Shearing (MGM, 1961)
- The Swingin's Mutual! (Capitol, 1961)
- Satin Affair (Capitol, 1962)
- San Francisco Scene (Capitol, 1962)
- Smooth & Swinging (MGM, 1962)

With others

- Milt Buckner, Rockin' with Milt (Capitol, 1955)
- Nat King Cole, Nat King Cole (Capitol, 1992)
- Johnny Glasel, Jazz Session (ABC-Paramount, 1957)
- Lenny Hambro, Message from Hambro (Columbia, 1956)
- Joe Roland, Joe Roland Quintette (Bethlehem, 1955)
- Bobby Scott, Serenata (Verve, 1957)
- Tony Scott, Both Sides of Tony Scott (RCA Victor, 1956)
- Nancy Wilson, Guess Who I Saw Today (Capitol, 2005)
- Kai Winding, Solo (Verve, 1963)
