= Craig Morris =

American classical trumpet player

Craig Morris is an orchestral trumpeter known for serving as the Principal Trumpet of the Chicago Symphony Orchestra. He is also known as a soloist and chamber musician. He is an endorsing artist for Yamaha Instruments, and is currently Professor of Trumpet for the Frost School of Music at the University of Miami.

== History ==
Craig Morris was born in 1968 in Texas. He received much musical influence from his father, a local band director and tuba player. After high school he attended the University of Texas at Austin and received his Bachelor of Music. In 1991 he received a Master of Music from the San Francisco Conservatory.

== Career ==
Craig Morris was a member of the Pinnacle Brass Quintet from 1991–1994, as well as a member of Dallas Brass. He obtained the position of principal trumpet in the Sacramento Symphony Orchestra, Opera, and Ballet from 1994-1996. From 1999-2001 he was Associate Principal Trumpet for the San Francisco Symphony. With the Chicago Symphony Orchestra, Morris served as substitute Fourth/Utility Trumpet from March 1998 until April 1999, and from April 2001 until August 2003, he was principal trumpet. Morris also has appeared as a solo artist with the Austin Handel-Haydn Society, Diablo Symphony Orchestra, and the San Francisco Old & New Music Ensemble.

Morris is currently the professor of trumpet at the University of Miami, Frost School of Music. Morris spends each August performing as principal trumpet at the Cabrillo Festival of Contemporary Music, having been appointed by music director Marin Alsop in 2007. In 2011, Morris was awarded a trial for principal trumpet with the St. Louis Symphony Orchestra.

== Major performances ==
- Soloist with the Chicago Symphony, playing Bach's Brandenburg Concerto No. 2 and Stravinsky's L’Histoire du Soldat.
- Solo artist at the Ravinia Festival.
- Performed the world premier of Thom Sleeper's Concerto for Trumpet.
