= Mysteries =

Mysteries may refer to:

- Sacred mysteries in ancient esoteric religions
- "The Mysteries: Renaissance Choros", a 1931 poem by H.D.
- Mysteries (album), a 1975 jazz album by Keith Jarrett
- Mysteries (novel), an 1892 psychological novel
- The Mysteries, a 1977 English play cycle
- The Mysteries (album), a 2013 album by composer John Zorn
- Mysteries, a series of novels set in the Forgotten Realms of Dungeons & Dragons
- The Mysteries, a 2023 book by Bill Watterson and John Kascht

== See also ==
- Mystery (disambiguation)
