= David Snow =

David Snow may refer to:

- David Snow (ornithologist) (1924–2009), English ornithologist
- David Snow (composer) (born 1954), American composer
- David A. Snow (born 1943), professor of sociology
- David Snow (American football) (born 1989), American football offensive lineman
- David B. Snow Jr. (born 1954), American business executive
- Dave Snow, American college baseball coach
