= New York Brass Quintet =

Chamber music ensemble

The New York Brass Quintet, founded in 1954 by Robert Nagel and Harvey Phillips, was the first brass quintet to regularly perform on the concert stage. The ensemble is credited with popularizing the modern brass quintet in its most common form: 2 trumpets, 1 horn, 1 trombone, and 1 tuba. While the NYBQ most frequently performed transcriptions, they also commissioned prominent works for the brass quintet by Alec Wilder (1959), Malcolm Arnold (1961), Gunther Schuller (1961), Alvin Etler (1963), Vincent Persichetti (1968), and Jan Bach (1971). The quintet disbanded in 1985.

== History ==
After World War II, Julian Menken, a trombone student at Juilliard, brought together groups of students to perform brass chamber music, which became known as the New York Brass Ensemble. The membership of the ensemble changed frequently, as students came in and out of Juilliard's brass program. The ensemble performed on several radio broadcasts in 1948, performed in several concert venues across New York City in 1950, and recorded an album of Giovanni Gabrieli canzonas. Menken disbanded the ensemble in the early 1950s to pursue a business career. One of the members of the New York Brass Ensemble, trumpet player Robert Nagel, along with tuba player Harvey Phillips, reorganized the ensemble in 1954 as the New York Brass Quintet. One distinguishing feature of the new quintet was the addition of the tuba, which was unusual for brass chamber music ensembles of the time. One of the primary missions of the new ensemble was educational; the quintet collaborated with a Young Audiences organization to present lectures on the different brass instruments, as well as educate audience members on brass chamber music literature.

== Members ==
The original members of the group were:

- Robert Nagel, trumpet
- Johnny Glasel, trumpet
- Frederick Schmidt, horn
- Erwin Price, trombone
- Harvey Phillips, tuba

By 1966, the group consisted of:

- Robert Nagel, trumpet
- Allan Dean, trumpet
- Paul Ingraham, horn
- John Swallow, trombone
- Toby Hanks, tuba

== See also ==
- American Brass Quintet - another New York-based brass quintet founded in 1960. Several members also performed with the NYBQ.
- Brass quintet repertoire
- Brass instrument
