= Calliope (band) =

American band

- Origin: New York City
- Genres: Renaissance music, modern music
- Labels: Nonesuch, Summit
- Members: Lucy Bardo; Lawrence Benz; Allan Dean; Ben Harms

Calliope is a New York City-based band which plays Renaissance music and modern music using early musical instruments, such as the sackbut, shawm, viol, and the hurdy-gurdy.

Calliope won the Naumburg Chamber Music Award in 1975. The band performed at the 1977 U.S. Presidential inauguration and later contributed to the soundtrack for R O Blechman's 1978 PBS holiday special Simple Gifts.

The band released three albums: Calliope Dances: A Renaissance Revel (Nonesuch, 1982); Calliope Festival (Nonesuch, 1984); and Diversions (Summit, 1990). The band recorded Peter Schickele's composition Bestiary in 1984.

== Members ==
- Lucy Bardo – viola, vielle, rebec
- Lawrence Benz – sackbut, lute, recorder, crumhorn
- Allan Dean – cornetto, sackbut, recorder, crumhorn
- Ben Harms – viol, pipe, tabor, recorder, crumhorn, percussion
