= Me and Bessie =

- Cover of an album of selections from the revue
- Music: Various; Howlett Smith & Lenny Hambro - co-Musical Directors
- Lyrics: Various
- Book: Will Holt; Linda Hopkins
- Productions: 1974 Washington, D.C. 1975 Los Angeles; 1975 Broadway

Me and Bessie is a musical revue about the life and career of blues singer Bessie Smith. The basically one-woman show, conceived and written by Will Holt and Linda Hopkins and performed by Hopkins, features songs by Lil Green, Clarence Williams, Henry Creamer, Andy Razaf, and Jimmy Cox, among others.

It originally was presented at Ford's Theatre in Washington, D.C. from November 1–17, 1974, then produced by the Center Theatre Group and staged by Robert Greenwald at the Mark Taper Forum from April 4 through May 3, 1975.

The Broadway production was directed by Greenwald, with special dance sequences choreographed by Lester Wilson for two characters, identified only as Man and Woman (Lester Wilson and Gerri Dean). Howlett Smith and Lenny Hambro were co-Musical Directors. Donald Harris was responsible for scenic design.

Following two previews, it opened at the Ambassador Theatre on October 22, 1975. It transferred to the Edison Theatre on December 3, 1975 and remained there until December 5, 1976, running for a total of 453 performances. Between September 24 and its closing, it ran in repertory with Oh! Calcutta!

In and Around Town, a weekly critical guide for entertainment in New York, included a capsule review for Me and Bessie that read, "The raw fervor of Linda Hopkins's blues singing is all that matters here, and it's enough. Unfortunately, the show is also burdened with a silly script by Will Holt, which consists mostly of having Miss Hopkins disavow the fact that she's Bessie Smith with all the fervor of a Kennedy disavowing politics." However, in 2011, Backstage magazine remembered Hopkin's performance as Smith: "It's been 36 years since I saw her in it at the Mark Taper Forum in Los Angeles, but she's stayed with me as the definitive Bessie Smith, and of course the cast album plays even more powerfully than Smith's original."

Linda Hopkins was nominated for the Drama Desk Award for Unique Theatrical Experience but lost to The Norman Conquests. The production held the record for the longest-running one-woman show in Broadway history until Golda's Balcony, starring Tovah Feldshuh, surpassed it by forty performances.

== Song list ==
Act 1

- "I Feel Good"
- "God Shall Wipe All Tears Away"
- "Moan You Mourners"
- "New Orleans Hop Scop Blues"
- "Romance in the Dark"
- "Preach Them Blues"
- "A Good Man Is Hard to Find"
- "T'Ain't Nobody's Business If I Do"
- "Gimme a Pigfoot (And a Bottle of Beer)"
- "Put It Right Here"
- "You've Been a Good Ole Wagon"
- "Trombone Cholly"
- "Jazzbo Brown"
- "After You've Gone"

Act 2

- "There'll Be a Hot Time in the Old Town Tonight"
- "Empty Bed Blues"
- "Kitchen Man"
- "Mama Don't Low"
- "Do Your Duty"
- "Fare Thee Well"
- "Nobody Knows You When You're Down and Out"
- "Trouble"
- "The Man's All Right"
