= Lenny Hambro =

American jazz musician (1923–1995)

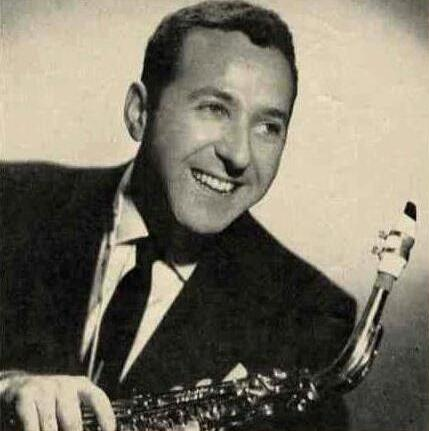
- Hambro in 1957

Background information
- Born: Leonard William Hambro; October 16, 1923; The Bronx, New York, U.S.
- Died: September 26, 1995 (aged 71) Somers Point, New Jersey, U.S.
- Genres: Jazz; swing; bebop; mambo; cubop
- Occupations: Musician; band manager; music arranger; composer; producer
- Instruments: Alto saxophone; flute; tenor saxophone; baritone saxophone; clarinet
- Years active: 1942–1995

Leonard William Hambro, known as Lenny Hambro (October 16, 1923 – September 26, 1995), was a journeyman jazz musician who played woodwinds, primarily alto saxophone, with a host of bands, orchestras, and jazz notables from the early 1940s through the mid-1960s, and continued as a session musician, music producer, booking agent, and entertainment coordinator through the mid-1990s. Early in his professional career, Hambro spelled his name "Lennie" but changed it to the former spelling in 1954, although he was occasionally referred to as "Lennie" in the press as late as 1957. Hambro broke into the profession with Gene Krupa in 1942. However, he is best known for his time as manager and assistant band leader with the New Glenn Miller Orchestra under the direction of Ray McKinley. He was well known in the Latin Jazz community and was closely associated with Chico O'Farrill.

Of Dutch Jewish heritage and the son of a diamond setter, Hambro was born in the Bronx in October 1923 and lived in, or in the vicinity of New York City for the majority of his life. He married singer Lynn Michels of Chester, Pennsylvania, in 1960, and together they raised two boys, Lee and Larry. Hambro died of a blood clot following open-heart surgery in September 1995, at Egg Harbor Township, New Jersey. During his lifetime, he worked over 80 recording sessions and appears as either a leader or sideman on nearly 100 LPs / CDs released in the U.S., as well as numerous foreign titles.

== Early life and education ==
Lenny Hambro was born on October 16, 1923 to Harry and Rose (née Levine) Hambro in the Bronx, New York, the younger of two children. Lenny lived with his parents and older sister, Adelaide, in an apartment at 984 Sheridan Avenue – just a few blocks northeast of old Yankee Stadium, which was completed the year of his birth. His father worked as a diamond polisher and setter. His mother, who played ragtime piano in the home, died of breast cancer when Hambro was just 12. Hambro graduated from James Monroe High School (later Bronx Little School) in the Soundview section of the Bronx in 1941 (where Stan Getz would begin as a reluctant, periodic student just a year later). After his father's death from pneumonia when Lenny was 28, Hambro largely lived "out of a suitcase", but, when in New York, stayed with older sister, Adelaide, and her husband, Harold, in the Bronx, until his marriage in 1960.

As a teenager, Hambro pestered his father for a trumpet, but it was his brother-in-law, Harold Segal (older sister Adelaide's husband), who introduced 15-year-old Hambro to woodwinds, giving him a soprano saxophone and introductory music lessons. (Harold Segal played both the tenor saxophone and clarinet semi-professionally with an Irish band for a time.) By all accounts, Hambro quickly eclipsed his brother-in-law, taking every music class in which he could enroll. As a high school student, Hambro took private lessons from Bill Sheiner, one of the leading music teachers and session musicians in New York City. Sheiner taught in a studio behind the Bronx Musical Mart at 174th Street and Southern Boulevard, between Lenny's school and home. (Stan Getz and future chairman of the Federal Reserve Board, Alan Greenspan, were fellow students of Sheiner.) Sheiner played multiple instruments – clarinet, saxophone, flute, and oboe – and most of his students were trying to simultaneously learn two similar instruments. Sheiner employed two books that are still standard texts: The Universal Complete Saxophone Method, and Klosé Complete Clarinet Method.

During this period, Sheiner, who had worked in Shep Fields' all-saxophone band, decided to build his own all-sax band with eight of his students. With Sheiner as frontman, and a drummer, pianist, and bassist, the band included both Lenny and Stan Getz as well as Sol Schlinger, Irving Frank, Red Press, Jerry Grosser, Stan Yuden and Alan Kimmel. The band worked up some arrangements and auditioned for Maria Kramer, who owned both the Lincoln and Edison hotels (both featured dance bands) but the WWII draft intervened and the band quickly disbanded. During his later high-school years, Hambro played alto sax, tenor sax, clarinet, and flute in an assortment of teen dance bands, including a summer in the Catskills, playing occasional gigs in the evenings, while working as a lifeguard during the day at a resort hotel pool. (Years later, Hambro would return to the Catskills, playing with Machito's Orchestra at the Concord Resort Hotel, and during another summer, had his own quintet in the lounge.)

== Career ==
=== 1942–1954 ===
During World War II, many professional musicians enlisted and served in military bands. As a result, there were occasional openings in established commercial bands. At just 18 years of age, Hambro auditioned for an empty seat in Gene Krupa's band. His audition included playing "American Bolero", a piece written in 5/4 time, a complex meter that was quite progressive in Western music at the time. Although initially skeptical, Krupa and trumpeter Roy Eldridge were impressed and called Hambro at home the next day to tell him that he had secured the job and to schedule him for a tuxedo fitting. On October 28, 1942, two weeks after his 19th birthday, Hambro was on stage with the Gene Krupa Band at the Times Square Paramount Theater. However, he left the band in December of that year for the Army and joined Ivan Mogul, Shorty Rogers and approximately 40 other musicians from the Bronx who had agreed to man the 379th Army Service Forces (ASF) Band in Newport News, Virginia, where he stayed for three years. From 1946 to 1947, Hambro was a featured soloist with Billy Butterfield and his orchestra; recording with him in 1946. In 1947, he played with Bobby Byrne before rejoining Gene Krupa as lead alto sax and featured jazz soloist through 1950. (Hambro, along with tenor saxophonist Buddy Wise and trombonist Frank Rosolino, is featured in a 15-minute film short, Deep Purple, directed by Will Cowan in 1949, which focused on Gene Krupa and His Orchestra.) In addition to playing with Krupa, Hambro simultaneously played in other bands, including the Latin jazz ensembles of Vincent Lopez and Pupi Campo. In 1948, Hambro toured with Machito and his Afro-Cuban Orchestra where he was featured as a soloist on alto sax. From 1951 to 1952, Hambro played with and managed the Ray McKinley Band. From 1951 to 1954, he also played and recorded with Chico O'Farrill's orchestra, with a year off (1952) to tour with The Gene Krupa Orchestra. From 1948 until 1954, he recorded with all of these artists and both Charlie Ventura's orchestra and Joe Loco's band, as well as Earl Williams, Sauter-Finegan, George Williams, and Red Norvo. During this period (1951–1956), Hambro also accompanied vocalists at the Paramount Theater, did studio work, worked as a music copyist, and taught private lessons. He continued to hone his own skills by studying clarinet with Leon Russianoff and flute with Henry Zlotnick, both of the Manhattan School of Music.

=== The Lenny Hambro Quintet ===
In 1953, Lenny formed a quintet, recording four tunes in September with Machito's rhythm section; and four more tunes in April 1954 – that together formed the foundation of his first albums, both released by Savoy. Over the next two years, the members of the quintet alternately included Wade Legge, Rene Hernandez, Eddie Costa, or Hank Jones on piano; Dick Garcia, Sal Salvador, or Barry Galbraith on guitar; Louis Barretto, Clyde Lombardi or Arnold Fishkind on bass; Eddie Bert on trombone; Mel Zelnick, Harold Granowsky, Gus Johnson Jr., or Sid Bulkin on drums; Jose Mangual, Ubaldo Nieto, and Ray "Mongo" Santamaria on Bongos/Congas; and Babs Gonzales' vocals. As a quartet, quintet, or sextet, a Lenny Hambro-led and named ensemble would continue as a group through 1964. Hambro's first two albums, both released in 1954, were largely ignored by both the public and the music industry. His later albums (released in 1955 and 1956 by Epic) received mediocre reviews. Gramophone criticized Hambro as "a thoroughly competent dance-band musician who obviously believes he is playing jazz," and for "blantant copying" of Charlie Parker's phrasing. These uncredited reviews directly contrasted with a George T. Simon Metronome review of a Gene Krupa Band engagement at New York City's Bop City in March 1950, where the typically stingy Simon credited the band with "a good sax quintet, thanks in part to Lenny Hambro's lead". In any case, Hambro would release no further recordings as a bandleader or headliner.

The New Glenn Miller Orchestra, circa 1961, with Lenny on alto sax.

=== 1955–1964 ===
In 1955, Hambro again played in and managed the Ray McKinley Band. In 1956, capitalizing on the popularity of The Glenn Miller Story movie, Willard Alexander persuaded the Glenn Miller Estate to sponsor a new Glenn Miller Orchestra (GMO) with McKinley as its leader. Hambro was asked to reorganize the band and he functioned as both manager and assistant leader. The band played arrangements of old Miller favorites including the original music and more contemporary hits, most arranged by Deane Kincaide. The orchestra was very successful, performing on television and traveling the world. In addition to being a featured soloist, Hambro and his quintet, formed from other members of the GMO, were a featured act with the orchestra. The band toured the United States routinely during this period as well as England, Poland, "Iron Curtain" Europe, and North Africa in 1957 and 1958, where they played at U.S. military facilities and Embassies; and Japan twice in the early 1960s. Lenny was with the New Glenn Miller Orchestra for eight years, during which time they played a live 13-week summer replacement show on CBS, co-hosted by McKinley and vocalist Johnny Desmond ("Glenn Miller Time", 1961; broadcast from the Ed Sullivan Theater in NYC; see External links), and the NBC Bandstand on both radio and television, and cut seven albums for RCA Victor. During this period, Lenny lived on 77th Road in Kew Gardens Hills in Queens where his friend, composer and pianist Eddie Costa, was a neighbor.

=== Marriage ===
After a brief 1957 engagement to GMO vocalist Lorry Peters, Hambro met vocalist and beauty queen Lynn Michels in 1958, when he was 34 and she was 18. Michels, born Charlotte Joyce Wexler, was from Chester, Pennsylvania. She was on stage from an early age, working alongside a number of Pennsylvania-based acts, including The Four Aces and Bill Haley and the Comets. At age 10, she took first place during an appearance on Paul Whiteman's Philadelphia-based Saturday morning talent show, TV Teen Club (an indirect predecessor to American Bandstand). Later, she was a regular on the Sunday morning children's talent show, The Horn and Hardart Children's Hour, hosted by Stan Lee Broza on WCAU TV in Philadelphia and broadcast on WNBT TV in New York. While still in High School, Michels sang with the Al Raymond big band, playing the many ballrooms and lounges in the Tri-State area, as well as performing for weddings, ballroom dances, and senior proms at many Tri-State area high schools and colleges. However, the band's steady gig was Sunday nights at Upper Darby's St. Alice's Social Center. When she met Hambro in 1958, Michels was in her senior year of high school and singing with Al Raymond. She was introduced to Hambro by the manager of the El Rancho Club in Woodlyn, Pennsylvania, where she had gone to see Ray McKinley's Glenn Miller Orchestra. Hambro called her later that year to invite her to a GMO performance at a ballroom in Philadelphia. That evening, Hambro told her that he would pursue and marry her, but it was an extended and often long-distance courtship. When Michels graduated from high school, she went to work for the Matys Brothers, a rockabilly and later polka band from the Philadelphia area that was part of Bill Haley's stable. She would be with them until June 1960, touring the U.S. and Canada, while continuing to see Hambro when she could. Hambro and Michels were engaged July 23, 1960, after a GMO gig at the Brandywine Music Box and married on November 5, 1960, at The Wynne catering hall on North 54th Street in Philadelphia (Wynnefield), with Ray McKinley as their best man, and Ray's wife, Gretchen, looking on. They moved into an apartment at 159-15 83rd Avenue in Kew Gardens, Queens, New York. Son, Larry was born in the late summer of 1961, followed by brother Lee, in the winter of 1963.

== Career – the later years ==
=== Booking agent ===
Beginning in 1964, Hambro worked as a booking agent for Willard Alexander, at the Willard Alexander Inc. agency located at 425 Park Avenue. Willard Alexander, a jazz booking agent who helped usher in the 'Big Band Era', specialized in booking famous big bands. His clients included Maynard Ferguson, Buddy Rich and Artie Shaw; the Count Basie Band, and the Duke Ellington, Guy Lombardo, Tommy Dorsey, Jimmy Dorsey and Russ Morgan Orchestras. During this period, Hambro continued both teaching and studio work, playing on recordings of The Spinners, Cissy Houston (Whitney Houston's mother), Marlene Ver Planck, Bobby Hutcherson and his old friend Chico O'Farrill. In 1967, Hambro signed on with Don Elliott and Don Elliott Productions, producing music for commercials, cartoons, documentaries, and film. That year, Hambro and Michels, with their sons, moved from New York City to Old Bridge, New Jersey, where they bought their first house and would live for the next 15 years.

=== Advertising and movies ===
In the late summer of 1967, after a break with Elliott, Hambro and virtuoso violist Emanuel Vardi set up shop as "Hambro and Vardi" at 119 West 59th Street in NYC, producing advertising spots or entire campaigns for companies such as Putnam Coffee, Chun King, Wearing Blender, Lux Liquid, and Diet Imperial Margarine. In addition, the firm did new logos for RKO General, Westinghouse, and Benson & Hedges. They also produced sales films for American Airlines and U.S. Plywood. Further, they did original music for radio and television advertisements, such as the "Coke Is It" campaign and Life Savers' "A Part of Living". The pair shared in three CLIOs for Best Television/Cinema advertisement (Buitoni Sauce – 1969; Frigidaire Range – 1974; Life Savers -1977). Hambro also wrote, produced, recorded the music for, and acted in an early TV advertisement for Girl Scout Cookies: "The Cookies Are Here". In addition to writing ad "jingles", in 1970, the team broke into film, composing original music for the feature film Dirtymouth (about Lenny Bruce). Additionally, Vardi composed the music for the film This Is America, with a sextet led by Hambro performing a number of jazz selections. The duo also did industrial films including shorts for TWA and Eastman-Kodak. In 1972, Vardi and Hambro worked with actor and sound engineer William "Bill" Daly to orchestrate the sound for the film Toys Are Not For Children. Vardi and Hambro continued their collaboration until the summer of 1976, when Vardi left so that he could spend more time performing. Hambro continued on his own with Lenny Hambro Productions, Inc., located at 1650 Broadway in NYC. The company drew on the talents of fellow writers Jeff Hest, Anne Bryant, and Manny Album. Meanwhile, Hambro reworked the music for the Bachman Pretzels campaign, wrote music for a 60-second spot for PartsPost, and wrote several spots for the Commonwealth Bank of Detroit. In 1980, Hambro signed on to do the music arrangements / production for the short-lived puppet television series "Miss Peach of the Kelly School" based on the comic strip "Miss Peach" by Mell Lazarus. Although an episode won a Daytime Emmy Award, it was canceled in 1982. Hambro was still in the advertising and music production business as late as 1984 with Lenny Hambro Productions operating from an office on Oak Avenue in Lynwood, New Jersey. He also offered his services as an arranger and composer, with pianist and composer Lou Forestieri providing scoring services. His clients included ad agencies and film houses. However, by this time, much of the music, television, and film business had moved to California, and, thus, business was not good.

=== Working musician ===
Hambro continued working the clubs of New York City, Philadelphia, and Miami, and played the famed Rainbow Grill in midtown Manhattan during 1968–69 with a small combo led by old friend, Ray McKinley. In addition, when in Miami, he played with Tyree Glenn's group. In 1970, Hambro led and managed the orchestra for vocalist Warren Covington and did two half-hour specials on CBS television in the fall, before returning to work as a booking agent in 1971. Through his film industry connections, Hambro, a member of the Screen Actors Guild, was given a short uncredited cameo as a bandleader in the 1973 Paramount Pictures' film Serpico, starring Al Pacino. In 1975–76, Lenny found regular work in the orchestra pits of Broadway. He was co-Musical Director – with Howlett Smith – of the Broadway musical revue Me and Bessie with Linda Hopkins. It opened at the Ambassador Theatre on October 22, 1975, transferring to the Edison Theatre on December 3, 1975, where it remained until December 5, 1976, a run of 453 performances, a record for the longest-running one-woman show in Broadway history until "Golda's Balcony", starring Tovah Feldshuh, surpassed it. In 1978, Hambro was with The New York Jazz Repertory Company under the direction of Dick Hyman. He was also a regular – along with Paquito D'Rivera, his wife Brenda, Daniel Ponce, Victor Paz, Candido Camero, Tom Malone, Marvin Stamm, Jorge Dalto, Jon Faddis and Ruben Blades – at morning sessions in New York City, recording jingles for radio and TV commercials, led by his friend and former bandleader, Chico O'Farrill. O'Farrill was in demand in advertising circles for his ability to modify new and existing jingles to various Latin rhythms to appeal to a variety of Latin ethnicities. Hambro also continued to do club work, putting together a quartet under his name, notably accompanying Anita O'Day at Michel's Pub from September 1975 to January 1976.

=== Music director ===
After suffering a minor stroke, in 1980, at the age of 57, Hambro went to Atlantic City as entertainment director for Del Webb's Claridge and Hi Ho Casino (later the Claridge Hotel and Casino). With this transition, the family moved to Egg Harbor, New Jersey. Along with Marty Portnoy, Hambro helped reinvigorate ballroom dancing and big bands in Atlantic City. Beginning in September 1981, Hambro booked the big bands of Duke Ellington, Tommy Dorsey, Glenn Miller, Count Basie and The Royal Canadians. Subsequently, in 1982, Hambro became the music director at Bally's Park Place Casino Hotel where he fronted the "Lenny Hambro Orchestra" as the "Big Band on the Sand". He was simultaneously with the house band at Trump's Castle for a brief period after its opening in 1985. During this time, he remained active as a working musician, playing Philadelphia jazz clubs with myriad groups, and taking various gigs, including touring Europe with pianist Peter Duchin. His younger son, Lee, an accomplished drummer and professional musician by the age of 15, often "sat in". In his later years, Hambro donated his time and talent to charities such as the March of Dimes Telethon, and the Association for Retarded Citizens' "Starshine" (organized by performer Nelson Sardelli) in Atlantic City, NJ, a tradition that would continue each summer for nine years. He was also an avid racquetball player, playing as often as he could.

=== Final tracks ===
In 1991, with his boys grown and his wife spending six months of each year in Israel, Hambro moved to Florida to be close to his sister and other relatives, renting a Las Vistas apartment near the Inverrary Country Club in Fort Lauderdale (Fort Lauderhill). He taught private lessons, played in a variety of bands, both big and small, in Miami-Fort Lauderdale area jazz clubs, and continued to work as a booking agent. He also continued to readily donate his talents to charity fund raisers, most notably working with Jack Simpson to benefit the Brevard County Food Bank. However, suffering from severe chest pains, and told that he would need bypass surgery and a heart valve replacement, Hambro returned to New Jersey in early 1995 to be close to his sons, his wife, and the doctors with whom he was comfortable; and to work on Chico O'Farrill's comeback album.

Hambro recorded his final tracks at the Clinton Recording Studio at 653 10th Avenue in New York City in February 1995 for Chico O'Farrill's album, Pure Emotion (1995; Milestone Records). The record was nominated for a Grammy in 1996. The title track, Pura Emocion, was written specifically for Hambro, O'Farrill's longtime friend, and the journeyman leader of the reed sections in both O'Farrill's and Machito's orchestras. Hambro died of a blood clot following open heart surgery just seven months later, on September 26, 1995, at Shore Memorial Hospital, Somers Point, Egg Harbor Township, New Jersey, a month shy of his 72nd birthday. Hambro was buried along with his parents, grandparents, and other relatives at Mount Judah Cemetery, Ridgewood, Queens, New York. His sister, Adelaide, wife, Lynn, and two sons, Larry and Lee, survived him.

== Jazz lifestyle ==
The New Glenn Miller Orchestra, with vocalist Lorry Peters flanked by Hambro and Ray McKinley, boarding a flight to Europe in 1957

A look at the booking dates of The New Glenn Miller Orchestra in the two months following Hambro's November 5 wedding is representative of the lifestyle of a big-band musician. On the day of his marriage, Hambro and the 17-member The New Glenn Miller Orchestra were playing one of the ballrooms of The Bellevue-Stratford Hotel in Philadelphia, while his fiancée, Lynn Michels, was singing with Al Raymond's big band in another room. Immediately after his marriage, while Hambro and Michels celebrated a weekend honeymoon, the band played The Tuxedo Ballroom in New York City. On Monday, with Hambro and Michels following the tour bus in their new convertible, the band headed to the Midwest for two weeks of engagements, followed by dates in Louisiana and Texas. After a brief respite for Hanukkah/Christmas, they broadcast from the Aragon Ballroom in Chicago on New Year's Eve, and after the post-Christmas break, a few weeks later, on January 19, 1961, they performed at one of President John F. Kennedy's five inaugural balls in Washington, DC. The band's repertoire in January 1957 (during an extended engagement at the Cafe Rouge at the New York Statler Hotel, including Sunday afternoon's Treasury Savings Shows) included 60 Glenn Miller originals, 10 McKinley standards, 10 contemporary tunes done in the Glenn Miller style (thanks to arranger Joe Cribari) and several pieces by the Lenny Hambro Quintet.

Despite the "different-hotel-every-night" lifestyle of a jazz musician, Hambro managed not to be seduced by the drugs and alcohol that were rampant during the jazz era of the 1930s, '40s, and '50s, that ended the careers and/or lives of many jazz musicians. Hambro credited Roy Eldridge, a mentor from his initial years with Gene Krupa's band, for his being able to shun narcotics. When Hambro was just 19, Roy forced him to watch a band member inject heroin, and stay to watch its effects, with a stern warning not to get involved with drugs.

== Jazz legacy ==
Lenny Hambro was active as a performing and recording jazz musician for over 50 years. Although of Dutch Jewish extraction, Hambro was as comfortable with an Afro-Cuban jazz orchestra as he was with a Swing era dance band, or a Dixieland Jazz band. He was steadily in demand as a stage and session musician during the 1950s New York-based Mambo dance craze. A review of the musicians on Machito's 1958 album for Tico, Mi Amigo, Machito, reveals a host of Latinos – José Mangual Sr., Uba Nieto, Johnny "La Vaca" Rodríguez Sr., Mario Bauzá, José "Pin" Madera, Ray Santos – and Lenny Hambro. A Metronome article from 1955 referred to Hambro as the "Latin from Manhattan", and Hambro traveled to Cuba several times during this period to perfect his art. Yet, he spent eight subsequent years playing the disciplined, sophisticated swing of The New Glenn Miller Orchestra. Further, he was routinely drafted to fill missing chairs for both Duke Ellington's and Count Basie's orchestras, often the only caucasian face on stage.

Hambro was a member of the American Federation of Musicians of Atlantic City, Local No. 708; Musicians Local No. 802 in New York City; the Screen Actors Guild; the American Federation of Recording Artists; and the National Academy of Recording Artists. He worked on more than 80 recording sessions and appears as either a leader or sideman on nearly 100 LPs/CDs released in the U.S. Due to a resurgence of interest in period Swing, Bebop, and Latin jazz, recordings of Hambro's efforts as a sideman continue to be promulgated, with nearly 40 retrospective albums featuring his efforts released since his death. Additionally, both Lenny Hambro Quintet albums were re-released as compact discs in 2002 (Collectables).

Hambro's favorite recording was Duke Ellington's "Warm Valley", largely due to Johnny Hodges' saxophone. As a composer, Hambro is best known for "The Lonely One", written with Roberta Heller (then a 21-year-old lyricist for music publisher Ivan Mogull,) which Nat King Cole recorded for Capitol in 1956. It has been covered over the years by a variety of artists, including Gene Tierney, Marianne Solivan, Sil Austin, Kitty Kallen, Kelly Friesen, Lisa Ekdahl, Mark Doyle, the Robin Nolan Trio, the Music Rama Band, and by several Finnish bands, where it was a minor hit as "Tuo Onneton" (with Finnish Lyrics by Kari Tuomisaari). On the Latin side, Hambro wrote "Mamboscope" for Machito, an instrumental that has been widely licensed for Afro-Cuban and Latin jazz compilation albums.

One of Hambro's greatest accolades came from famed clarinetist and band leader Benny Goodman, who, when introduced to him by pianist Leonid Hambro (no relation), said of Hambro: "No need, I know who he is; he's the only man that makes me feel self-conscious when I play."

== Musical preferences ==
Hambro played his alto with a light, sweeping style and, on ballads, had a tone similar to Johnny Hodges' technique. He was influenced by Charlie Parker and was once described as mixing the styles of Benny Carter and Johnny Hodges. He often played with Duke Ellington's band as saxophone lead when Johnny Hodges was absent.

Hambro was fond of the musical stylings of Charlie Parker, Johnny Hodges, and Benny Goodman. His favorite arrangers included Neal Hefti (for Woody Herman, Count Basie, Alvino Rey, Georgie Auld, and Neal Hefti), Johnny Mandel (for Alvino Rey), and Chico O'Farrill (for Machito and Chico O'Farrill).

Although Hambro played a Selmer Alto saxophone on occasion, his favorite instrument was a Martin "Magna" alto sax. He used an Arnold Brilhart "Ebolin" Streamline Model 4* mouthpiece with a Vic Olivieri #4 reed. Hambro liked the "Magna" model alto sax for its brilliant sound, and believed the "Magna"-hard reed combination was less likely to play out of tune. During the 1950s, Hambro was often photographed with a Brilhart "Tonalin" ivory-colored Lucite mouthpiece. On clarinet, he also played a harder reed – a Vandoren #4. Lenny played a Martin "The Martin" tenor saxophone. After 1967, Hambro experimented with the Selmer Varitone electronic pickup and effects unit, which can be heard on Chico O'Farrill's 1968 album, "Married Well", and 1995's "More Than Mambo: Introduction To Afro-Cuban Jazz", both from Verve.

== Discography ==
Lenny Hambro Discography – 1948 to 2015
Discography as leader (LPs & 45s.): Ham Nose c/w Try a Little Tenderness (1953; Savoy) Lenny Hambro; Mambo Barbarita c/w Feeding the Chicken (1954; Savoy) Lenny Hambro / Eddie Bert; Lennie Hambro (1954; Savoy) Lenny Hambro; Mambo Hambro (1954; Savoy) Lenny Hambro; Message from Hambro (1955; Columbia) Lenny Hambro Quintet; The Nature of Things (1956; Epic) Lenny Hambro Quintet; Album Discography as sideman (LPs & CDs only; On Alto Saxophone unless otherwise noted.): Flamingo c/w Carioca (1951; Mercury / Clef) Chico O'Farrill; Music from South America (1951; Verve Records) Chico O'Farrill; Afro-Cuban Jazz (1951; Clef / Verve) Machito / Chico O'Farrill / Dizzy Gillespie; Afro-Cuban (1951; Clef / Verve) Chico O'Farrill; Soul Source (1951; Verve) Chico O'Farrill / Machito; The Second Afro-Cuban Jazz Suite (1951; Norgran) Chico O'Farrill; Bucabu c/w Sonoro (1951; Mercury / Clef) Flip Phillips / Machito; JATP Mambo c/w Cuban Blues (1951; Clef) Chico O'Farrill; Peanut Vendor c/w Malaguena (1951; Clef) Chico O'Farrill; Taboo c/w The Disappearance (1951; Clef) Chico O'Farrill; Castaglia c/w Havana Special (1951; Norgran) Chico O'Farrill; Chico O'Farrill (1951; Norgran) Chico O'Farrill; Our Best (1951; Clef) Various Artists; Chico O'Farrill Jazz (1951; Clef) Chico O'Farrill; Jazz North and South of the Border (1952; Clef / Verve) Chico O'Farrill; It Ain't Necessarily So c/w Guess What? (1952; Mercury / Clef) Chico O'Farrill; Classics in Jazz: Trumpet Stylists (1952; Capitol) Various Artists; Gene Krupa (1952; Clef) Gene Krupa (not released); Gene Krupa Plays the Classics (1952; Verve) Gene Krupa (not released); Roots of Rhythm & Blues Vol. 3 – Oh, We-Should-Be-Bop (Savoy/Arista; 1953) Various Artists; Tremendo Cumban (1953; Seeco) Machito and His Afro-Cubans; Classics in Jazz – Billy Butterfield (1953; Capitol) Billy Butterfield and his Orchestra; The Fox in Hi-Fi (1953; Brunswick) George Williams and his Orchestra; Connee Boswell (1954; Brunswick/American Decca) Connee Boswell; An Evening with Mary Ann McCall and Charlie Ventura (1954; Norgran) Charlie Ventura; Another Evening with Charlie Ventura and Mary Ann McCall (1954; Norgran) Charlie Ventura (Alto Sax, Baritone Sax); Various Artists – Tenor Saxes (1954; Norgran) Various Artists (Tenor Sax); Almost Like Being In Love (1954; Norgran) Charlie Shavers (Tenor Sax); Afro-Cuban Jazz (1954; Verve) Machito / Chico O'Farrill / Dizzy Gillespie; Machito Plays Mambos and Cha-Cha-Cha (1954; Seeco Records) Machito; Classics in Jazz (1955; Columbia) Billy Butterfield and his Orchestra; Tony Bennett (1955; Columbia) Tony Bennett; All Star Pops (1955; Columbia) Various Artists; An Afternoon with Charlie Ventura (1957; Columbia/Clef) Charlie Ventura; Whatever Lola Wants c/w Heart (1957; Philips – UK) Tony Bennett; The New Glenn Miller Orchestra in Hi-Fi (1957; RCA Victor) The New Glenn Miller Orchestra Directed by Ray McKinley (Alto Sax, Clarinet); Hot Club Melomani / American Jazz Groups (1957; Polskie Nagrania Muza – Poland) Lenny Hambro Quintet (Alto Sax, Clarinet, Flute); Something Old, New, Borrowed and Blue (1958; RCA Victor) The New Glenn Miller Orchestra Directed by Ray McKinley; Mi Amigo, Machito (1958; Tico) Machito and His Afro-Cubans; The Miller Sound (1958; RCA Victor) The New Glenn Miller Orchestra Directed by Ray McKinley (Alto Sax, Clarinet); On Tour With The New Glenn Miller Orchestra (1959; RCA Victor) The New Glenn Miller Orchestra Directed by Ray McKinley; Dance anyone? (1960; RCA Victor) The New Glenn Miller Orchestra Directed by Ray McKinley (Alto Sax, Clarinet); The Authentic Sound of The New Glenn Miller Orchestra – Today (1961; RCA Victor) The New Glenn Miller Orchestra Directed by Ray McKinley; Glenn Miller Time (1961; RCA Victor) The New Glenn Miller Orchestra Directed by Ray McKinley; Gene Krupa: Drummin' Man (1963; Columbia) Gene Krupa and various artists; Inolvidables (1967; Verve) Miguelito Valdes; Back to the Miller Sound (1968; Magic – FR) The New Glenn Miller Orchestra Directed by Ray McKinley Featuring the Lennie Hambro Quartet; Chico O'Farrill – Married Well (1968; Verve) The Chico O'Farrill Orchestra; A Breath of Fresh Air (1968; Audiophile) Marlene Ver Planck (Alto Sax, Clarinet); This Happy Feeling (1969; Mounted Records) Marlene Ver Planck (Alto Sax, Clarinet); The Fisher Fidelity Standard (1972; Fisher) Various Artists (Quadraphonic demo disc); Think It Over (1978; Private Stock) Cissy Houston Featuring Whitney Houston; As The Time Flies (1978; RCA Victor) Frank Weber; Conception: The Gift of Love (1979; Columbia) Bobby Hutcherson; Teo Macero: Impressions Of Virus (1979; Japanese Columbia) Teo Macero Orchestra (Flute); Life's A Party (1979; Private Stock) The Michael Zager Band (Alto Sax, Flute); A New York Singer (1980; Audiophile) Marlene Ver Planck (Alto Sax, Clarinet); Virus – Original Soundtrack (1980; Nippon Columbia – JP) Teo Macero; Billy Butterfield and his Orchestra, 1946 (1981; First Heard Records) Billy Butterfield and his Orchestra; Labor of Love (1981; Atlantic) The Spinners; Uptown (1990; Columbia) Roy Eldridge with The Gene Krupa Orchestra Featuring Anita O'Day; Live at Carnegie Hall & Montreux, Switzerland (1990; Columbia) Teresa Brewer (Alto Sax, Clarinet); Tremendo Cumban 1949–52 (1991; Tumbao – SP) Machito and His Afro-Cubans; One of a Kind Love Affair – The Anthology (1991; Atlantic) The Spinners (Tenor Sax); The Best of the Mambo, Vol. 1 (1992; BMG International) Various Artists; The Very Best of Spinners (1993; Rhino) The Spinners (Tenor Sax); Mambo Gee Gee 1950–1951 (1995; Tumbao – SP) Tito Rodriquez and His Orchestra; Pure Emotion (1995; Milestone) Chico O'Farrill and His Afro-Cuban Jazz Orchestra (Alto Sax, Clarinet, Flute); Lionel Hampton and His Orchestra – 1948 / Gene Krupa and His Orchestra – 1949 (1995; Forlane) Lionel Hampton, Gene Krupa and their orchestras; More Than Mambo: Introduction To Afro-Cuban Jazz (1995; Verve) Various Artists; Ritmo Pa' Gozar (1996; Caney – SP) Machito and His Afro-Cubans; Cuban Blues – The Chico O'Farrill Sessions (1996; Verve) Chico O'Farrill (Alto Sax, Clarinet); Let Me Off Uptown (1996; Drive Archives) Gene Krupa and His Orchestra Featuring Roy Eldridge, Don Fagerquist, Dolores Hawkins; The Swing Era – An Introduction to Gene Krupa – 1927–1947 (1998; Best of Jazz) Gene Krupa; The Gene Krupa Story (1999; Proper Box – UK) Gene Krupa; Let Me Off Uptown (1999; Columbia) Anita O'Day with Gene Krupa; Miguelito Valdes (Verve; 1999) Miguelito Valdes; Inolvidables (Universal/Polygram; 1999) Miguelito Valdes; Pandora's Box: 1946-'47 (2000; Hep Records – UK) Billy Butterfield and His Orchestra; Cinemaphonic – Electro Soul (2000; Emperor Norton) Various Artists; Saoco! Masters of Afro-Cuban Jazz (2001; Rhino) Various Artists; Mambo Mucho Mambo: The Complete Columbia Masters (2002; Sony) Machito and His Afro-Cuban Orchestra; Ritmo Caliente (2002; Proper Box – UK) Machito and His Afro-Cubans (Alto Sax, Tenor Sax); The Essentials (2002; WSM) The Spinners (Tenor Sax); The Chronological Gene Krupa & His Big Band – 1947–1949 (2003; Melodie Jazz Classic) Gene Krupa and His Orchestra; Chrome Collection (2003; Atlantic) The Spinners (Tenor Sax); Cigar Lounge, Vol. 3 (2003; Ayia Napa – GE) Various Artists (Alto Sax, Clarinet, Flute); Cuba 1923–1995 (2003; Fremeaux & Associates – FR) Various Artists; Arranger's Touch (2004; Proper Box – UK) Various Artists; The Arranger's Touch: Young Blood (2004; Proper Box – UK) Various Artists; The Miller Sound On Tour (2004; MSI Music) The New Glenn Miller Orchestra (Alto Sax, Clarinet); A Proper Introduction to Gene Krupa – Up an' Atom (2004; Proper Box – UK) Gene Krupa; The Best of the Mambo, Volume 1 (2004; RCA International) Various Artists; Ritmo Afro-Cubano (2004; Fantasy) Various Artists; Gene Krupa Vol. 2 Let Me Off Uptown (2004; Naxos – CA) Gene Krupa Featuring Anita O'Day; Drummin' Man 1927–1949 (2005; Jazz Legends) Gene Krupa; What Is There To Say? (2005; Jasmine) Billy Butterfield and His Orchestra; Chico O'Farrill – The Complete Norman Granz Recordings (2005; Lonehill Jazz) Chico O'Farrill; Starburst (2006; Sounds of Yesteryear) Gene Krupa and His Big Band; Manteca – The Roots of Afro-Cuban Jazz! (2007; Giant Steps) Various Artists; The Platinum Collection (2007; WEA International – UK) The Detroit Spinners (Tenor Sax); Coffee Time Jazz (2007; Verve) Various Artists; Relax and Mambo (2007; Living Era) Machito and His Afro-Cubans; Whistle Stop (2009; Montpellier) Ray McKinley and The Glenn Miller Orchestra (Alto Sax, Clarinet); Dance Anyone? (2011; Montpellier) Ray McKinley Directing The Glenn Miller Orchestra (Alto Sax, Clarinet); Lenny Hambro – Complete Sessions 1953–1957 (2015; Fresh Sound Records) Lenny Hambro Quintet (Alto Sax, Clarinet, Flute)
