= Talib Rasul Hakim =

American composer (1940–1988)

Talib Rasul Hakim (born Stephen Alexander Chambers; February 8, 1940 – April 2, 1988) was an American composer of African American heritage.

== Biography ==
Born in Asheville, North Carolina, he grew up in Chester, Pennsylvania, playing music in school, studying clarinet (his first instrument), piano, and singing in church choir. He attended Chester High School and played in its marching band, its symphony orchestra, and the Pennsylvania All-State Orchestra. At high school he discovered classical music and admired Beethoven, Mozart, Brahms, and Debussy. he was a younger brother to noted jazz drummer and composer Joe Chambers. He later studied music at the Manhattan School of Music, New York College of Music, and The New School for Social Research. His teachers included Morton Feldman, Ornette Coleman, Margaret Bonds, Robert Starer, Hall Overton, Chou Wen-Chung, William Sydeman, Hale Smith, and Charles Whittenberg.

Hakim first came to attention in the wider music community through appearances of his works on the "Music in Our Time" concert series in New York in the mid-1960s. He received awards and residencies from the Bennington Composers Conference (1964–1969) and the Connecticut Commission on the Arts (1981–1982), as well as ASCAP, grants from the National Endowment for the Arts, and the Creative Artist Public Service Program. In addition to composing, Hakim taught at Pace University, Adelphi University, Nassau Community College, and Morgan State University, as well as working as a radio and television producer.

After converting to Sufism in 1973, Hakim changed his name. He died aged 48 on April 2, 1988, at the Hospital of Saint Raphael in New Haven, Connecticut, after a long illness. He had three sons and a daughter.

== List of works ==
* Indicates extant score materials located in College Archives & Special Collections at Columbia College Chicago

- Mutations (1964)* bass clarinet, horn, trumpet, viola, cello
- Six Players and Voice (1964)* Soprano, clarinet, trumpet, cello, 2 percussion, and piano
- Four (1965)* Clarinet, trumpet, trombone, piano
- Piano Piece (1965) Piano
- Shapes (1965)* Chamber Orchestra
- Three Play Short Five (1965)* Bass clarinet, percussion, bass
- Contours (1966)* Oboe, Bassoon, horn, trumpet, cello, bass
- Currents (1967)* String Quartet
- Elements (1967) Flute/alto flute, clarinet/bass clarinet, violin/viola, cello, piano, glass and bamboo wind and hand chimes
- Roots and Other Things (1967) Flute/alto flute, oboe/EH, clarinet/bass clarinet, trumpet, horn, trombone, viola, cello, bass
- Sound-Gone (1967) Piano
- Inner-Sections (1967) Flute, clarinet, trombone, piano, percussion
- Sound Images (1969) Brass, 3 percussion, strings, female chorus
- Tone-Poem (1969)* Soprano, percussion, contrabass, and piano (text by Langston Hughes)
- Placements (1970)* Piano, percussion
- Set-Three (1970) Soprano, cello, piano
- Timelessness (1970) Flugelhorn, horn, trombone, tuba, 2 percussion, bass, and piano
- Uranian-Projections (1970) Soprano, percussion, and piano
- Visions of Ishwara (1970)* Orchestra
- Reflections on the 5th Day (1972) Narrator, chamber orchestra
- Concepts (1974)* Orchestra
- Recurrences (1974)* Orchestra
- Arkan- 5 (1980–81)* Chamber Orchestra
- Lailatu'l-Qadr (The Night of Power) (1984) Bass clarinet, bass, percussion
- Birmingham Reflections (1985) Narrator, Orchestra
- Az-Zaahir-Al Batin(The Outward-The Inward) (1985–86)* Orchestra
