= Allan Dean =

American trumpeter

Allan Dean (born April 29, 1938) is an American trumpeter who has spent much of his career working as a chamber music player in the United States. His career is particularly well established in the New York musical scene—primarily because of his long involvement with the New York Brass Quintet. While in New York City, he was a prolific commercial trumpeter, recording jingles for everything from ABC Nightly News to the Olympics. He is also a founding member of Summit Brass, and currently plays with the Saint Louis Brass Quintet. His arrangements are often featured on recordings with these ensembles.

Dean was involved in the period instrument revival in the 1960s and 1970s in the United States. He was one of the first American trumpeters to master the natural trumpet and the cornetto. He was a charter member of Calliope, the groundbreaking period instrument group.

Dean has taught at the Eastman School of Music, Indiana University, and the North Carolina School of the Arts. In 2019, he retired from the Yale School of Music in New Haven, Connecticut, and is now on the faculty of the Norfolk Chamber Music Festival in Norfolk, Connecticut.

== Partial discography ==
- American Brass Quintet, A Storm in the Land; Music of the 26th N.C. Regimental Band
- American Brass Quintet, Cheer Boys, Cheer! Music of the 26th N.C. Regimental Band
- Contemporary Chamber Ensemble, Spectrum
- Contemporary Chamber Ensemble, Weill/Milhaud
- New York Cornet and Sacbut Ensemble, Alleluia
- New York Cornet and Sacbut Ensemble, When Heaven Came to Earth; German Brass Music from the Baroque
- Anthony Plog, Colors for Brass
- Bobby Shew/Allen Vizzutti/Vincent DiMartino, Trumpet Summit
- David Taylor, Rzewski, Liebman, Ewazen, Dlugoszewski

With Calliope

- P. D. Q. Bach, Classical WTWP Talkity-Talk Radio (1991)
- Calliope, Diversions (1994)
- Calliope, Dances - A Renaissance Revel (1992)
- Calliope, Calliope Swings (1999)
- Calliope, Bestiary, A Music Theater Piece for Renaissance Ensemble

With New York Brass Quintet

- New York Brass Quintet, Bach and Before
- New York Brass Quintet, 50 Years

With Saint Louis Brass Quintet

- Daniel Perantoni, Daniel in the Lion's Den (1994)
- Saint Louis Brass Quintet, Fascinating Rhythms (2007)
- Saint Louis Brass Quintet, Baroque Brass
- Saint Louis Brass Quintet, Colors for Brass
- Saint Louis Brass Quintet, Pops
- Saint Louis Brass Quintet, Renaissance Faire

With Summit Brass

- Paul Hindemith, Complete Brass Works (1995)
- Summit Brass, American Tribute
- Summit Brasas, Delights
- Summit Brass, Paving the Way
- Summit Brass, Spirits of Fire
- Summit Brass, Summit Brass Live
- Summit Brass, A Summit Brass Night
- Summit Brass, Toccata & Fugue
