= The Philadelphia Brass =

American brass band

The Philadelphia Brass is a touring brass quintet based in Philadelphia, Pennsylvania.

The Philadelphia Brass has performed in over 500 concerts, toured internationally as well as throughout the United States of America, and given numerous clinics and master classes. As a performing ensemble, The Philadelphia Brass has been committed to public education; the group has coached musicians of all ages, and each member is a music educator. The Philadelphia Brass has won 1 Grammy award and has four nominations.

== Members ==
- Brian Kuszyk, trumpet
- Steven Heitzer, trumpet
- Anthony Cecere, horn
- Robert Gale, trombone
- Scott Mendoker, tuba

== Discography ==
- featured on Notes from Faraway Places, music of David Sampson (2015)
- Anniversary Album (2012)
- Christmas in the Grand Tradition (2009)
- Joan Lippincott and the Philadelphia Brass (1996)
- Christmas (1993)
- Renaissance & Baroque (1991)
