= Edison Theatre =

Former theater in Manhattan, New York

Coordinates: 40°45′34.92″N 73°59′10.31″W

- Arena Theatre
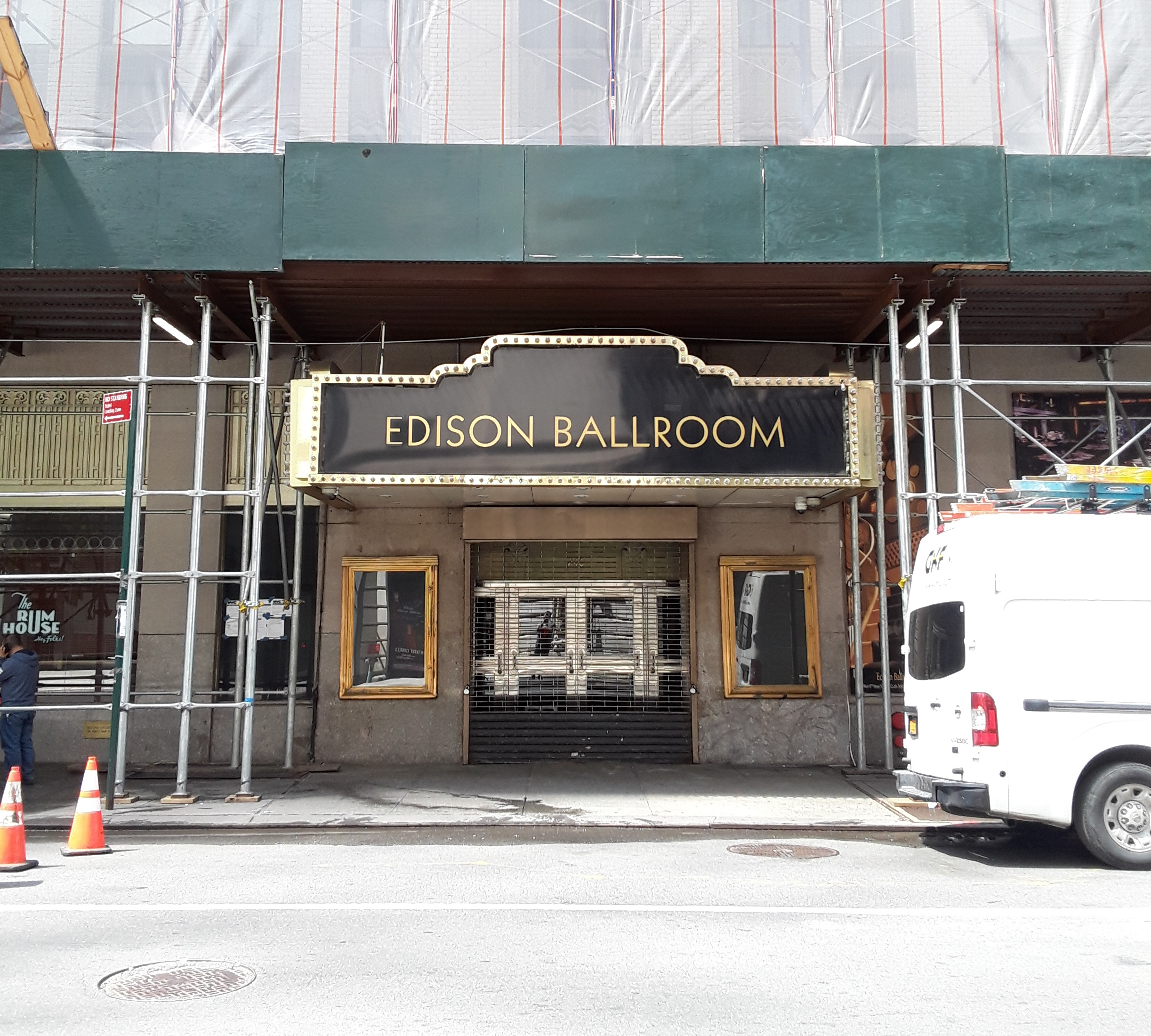
- The Edison Theater in 2021 as the Edison Ballroom
- Interactive map of Edison Theatre
- Address: 240 West 47th Street; New York City; United States
- Owner: Hotel Edison
- Capacity: 541
- Type: Broadway theatre
- Current use: Ballroom

Construction
- Opened: May 31, 1950
- Closed: February 24, 1991

The Edison Theatre was a Broadway theatre in the Hotel Edison at 240 West 47th Street in Midtown Manhattan, New York City. Opened in 1931 as the hotel's ballroom, it became the Arena Theatre on May 31, 1950, with a revival of George Kelly's The Show Off. The following year it was returned to the hotel's ballroom and remained as such until the early 1970s, when it was re-converted to a theatre. Its most notable production was Oh! Calcutta!, which opened on September 24, 1976, and ran for 13 years, with a total of 5,959 performances. Other shows staged here included Don't Bother Me, I Can't Cope, Me and Bessie, Sizwe Banzi is Dead, The Island, and Love Letters.

The theatre closed on February 24, 1991. Its final production was Those Were the Days, a musical revue celebrating Klezmer, featuring Bruce Adler, who was nominated for a Tony Award as Best Featured Actor in a Musical. In 1991, Maria DiDia, the Edison Theater General Manager, returned the property to the owners of the Edison Hotel, who promptly removed the theater seats and restored it to its original art deco ballroom configuration.
