= Robert Gale (musician) =

American jazz musician

Robert Gale is principal trombone with The Philadelphia Brass, the Opera Company of Philadelphia, the Chamber Orchestra of Philadelphia and a member of the pit orchestra of the Walnut Street Theatre. He has been a member of the music faculties of Swarthmore College and Valley Forge Military Academy and is currently on the faculty of The College of New Jersey. He has performed with the St. Louis and Richmond Symphonies and has recorded extensively for many vocal artists, television and major motion pictures. After graduating from the University of Illinois Bob began fifteen years of touring with the swing bands of Glenn Miller, Les Elgart, Jimmy Dorsey, and Bob Crosby, and the back-up bands for Bob Hope, Johnny Mathis, Donna Summer, Vic Damone, The Temptations, Manhattan Transfer, Natalie Cole and numerous others.
