= Vincent A. Jockin =

French composer and musician (born 1976)

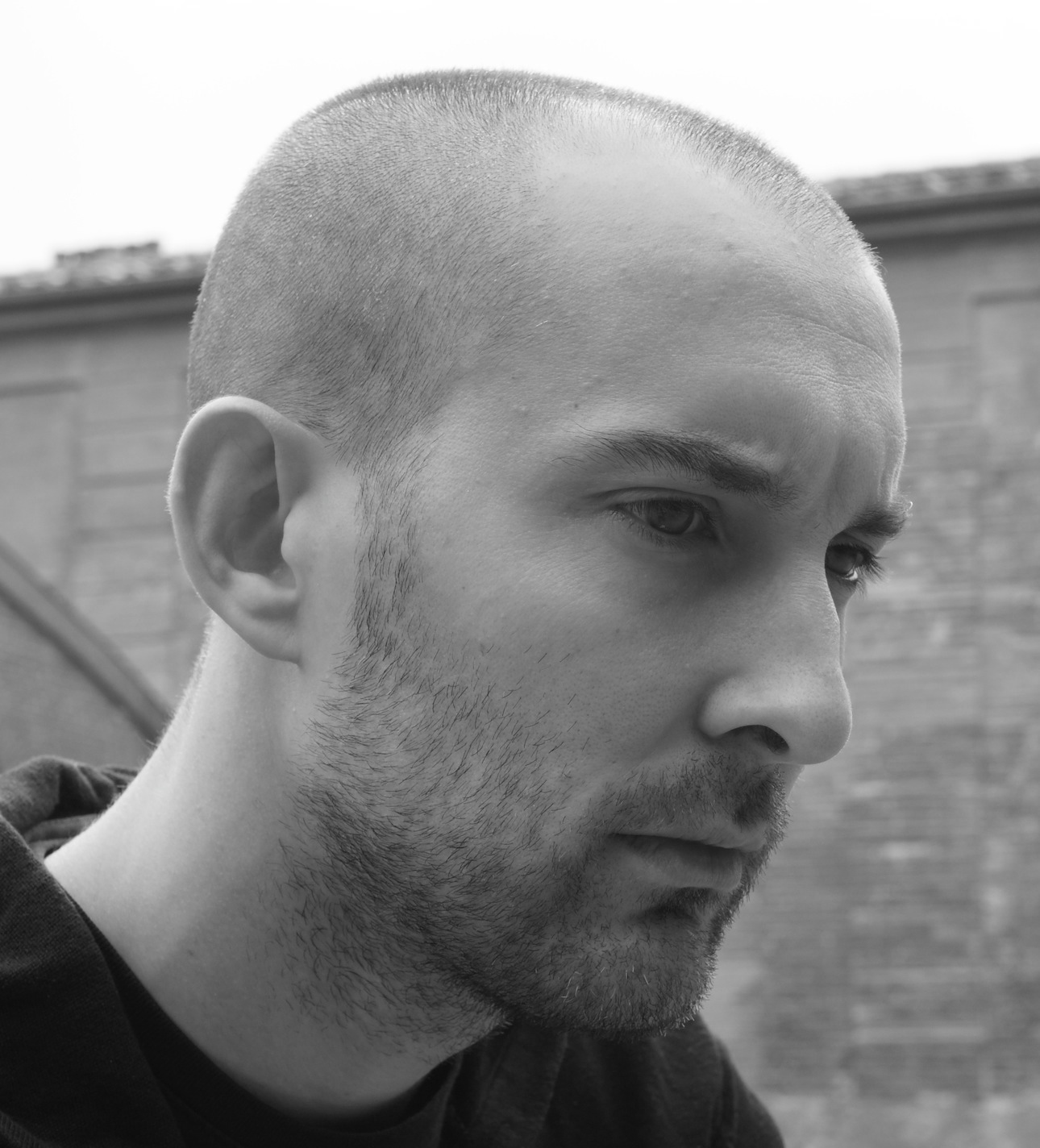
Vincent A. Jockin in 2012

Vincent Alexandre Jockin (born 31 May 1976) is a French composer and musician.

== Biography ==
Beginning with 1995, after obtaining the bachelor's degree of Science (B.S.), Jockin continued his musical studies at the university of Toulouse, then at Conservatory when he studied Harmony and Writing (counterpoint) with Paul Badens.

His first album of compositions was released in 2012: Works, Volume 1, recorded and produced at F.A.M.E.’S. Project Studio (MRT Center, Skopje, Republic of Macedonia), and performed by the Macedonian Radio Symphonic Orchestra conducted by Oleg Kondratenko. Excerpts of this album have been broadcast on France Musique and other European radio channels. His work has had premieres in Spain, Bulgaria, Croatia, Romania, Australia, USA and France.

He has collaborated with Thibaut Garcia, a French guitarist, to compose several works for solo guitar.

== Discography ==
- Works, Volume 1 (2012)

== Compositions (selection) ==
=== Orchestral works ===
- Polegnala E Todora, Op. 18, No. 1 (2005)
- Nos âmes mortes (Our Losts Spirits), Op. 22, No. 1 (2007)
- La marche des petits soldats de bois (The March Of The Small Wooden Soldiers), Op. 22, No. 2 (2008)

=== Chamber music ===
- Sonata, Opus 21, for piano (2007)
- Un souffle sur nos âmes (A Breath On Our Spirits), Opus 25, for clarinet and string quartet (2009)
- Farfalle, Op. 26, No. 1, for flute and bass clarinet (2010)
- Prelude, Op. 26, No. 2, for solo violin (2011)
- Moment Musical, Op. 26, No. 4, for solo guitar (2013)
- Quintet, Op. 27, No. 1, for trumpet and string quartet (2012)
- Brass Quintet, Op. 27, No. 2, for 2 trumpets, horn, trombone and tuba (2013)
