= William Schmidt (composer) =

American classical composer (1926–2009)

William Joseph Schmidt Jr. (March 6, 1926 – April 25, 2009) was an American composer, arranger and publisher of classical music.

He was born in Chicago, Illinois. He produced a large body of solo and chamber works for neglected woodwind, brass, and percussion instruments, including several pieces for classical saxophone.

According to the Classical Composers Database, "William Schmidt was a student of Ingolf Dahl at the University of Southern California where he earned a Master of Music degree in composition. Throughout his career, he has been the recipient of numerous awards and commissions." His Double Concerto for Trumpet, Piano and Chamber Orchestra was nominated for a Pulitzer Prize in 1981.

Schmidt operated his own publishing company, Western International Music Inc., in Greeley, Colorado.

== Recordings ==
- Mary Ann Covert & Steven Mauk - Tenor Excursions (1995)
- Trio Chromos - Trumpet Colors (2007)
