= Presidio Brass =

As a group of quintet for promoting music education

Presidio Brass is a brass quintet based in San Diego, California. Founded in 2006 primarily as a vehicle for promoting music education, the ensemble has become perhaps equally known for their work on the concert stage. The group's repertoire is made up of classical and commercial music transcriptions, including selections from composers Aaron Copland, Samuel Barber and George Gershwin to popular songs from jazz legend Dave Brubeck, the rock band Queen and the Broadway smash hit, West Side Story. The group often utilizes other instruments beyond brass, most notably piano, vocals/singing, and percussion.

The group has toured throughout the United States, China, and Canada.

== Current members ==
- Steve O'Connor- trumpet
- Miles McAllister- trumpet
- Josh Bledsoe- trombone/vocalist/guitar
- Geoff Durbin- euphonium/trombone
- Mike Frasier- tuba/piano

== Discography ==
- Sounds of the Cinema (Dunrobin Music, 2009)
- Christmas Day (Dunrobin Music, 2007)
- Stolen Moments (Dunrobin Music, 2007)
