= Howard L. Quilling =

American composer (1935–2016)

- Born: Howard Lee Quilling; December 16, 1935
- Died: February 26, 2016 (aged 80); Bakersfield, California, US
- Occupations: Composer and music teacher

Howard Lee Quilling (December 16, 1935 – February 26, 2016) was an American composer and music teacher.

== Life ==
Quilling completed his undergraduate studies at the University of Southern California in Los Angeles and at California State University. His professors included composers like Ingolf Dahl. While attending the University of Southern California, he met his wife, Joyce Quilling. In 1984, he graduated with his Ph.D. from the University of California, Santa Barbara.

In 1971, Quilling became a lecturer at California State University in Bakersfield. He retired in 1996 with the rank of professor.

As a composer, Quilling wrote over 250 pieces of music across multiple genres.

Quilling died on February 26, 2016, aged 80, in Bakersfield, California.

== Compositions ==
=== Pieces for orchestra ===
- 1979 · Music, for guitar and strings.
- 1982 · Textures, four miniatures for orchestra.

=== Pieces for wind orchestra ===
- 1967 · Intermezzo.
- 1968 · Introspections.
- 1970 · Suite, for alto saxophone and wind orchestra.
- 1973 · Symfonie.
- No Date · Chardy, for brass ensemble and wind orchestra.
- No Date · Diversions.

=== Pieces for choir ===
- 1973 · The Clouds of night are passed away, for mixed choir and piano.
- 1983 · Two anthems, for mixed choir and piano (or organ).
- 1985 · O Thou, who art the shepherd, for mixed choir and organ.
- 1986 · Upon a wintery night, for mixed choir and organ.

=== Vocal music ===
- 1958 · Two songs of Rupert Brooke, for voice and piano.
- 1967 · That holy thing, for voice and accordion.
- 1980 · What will you do on Tuesday, love?, for voice and piano.
- 1987 · Two love songs, for soprano, flute, clarinet, guitar, viola and double bass.
- 1993 · The Earth Remembers, vocal cycle for soprano, mixed choir and piano (or orchestra).
  1. The Earth Remembers.
  2. Prayer for the Departed Flower Woman.
  3. Western October.
  4. Afterglow.
- Equepoise, for voice and piano.
- Remembrance, for soprano and orchestra.
- September Love, for soprano, clarinet, and piano.

=== Chamber music ===
- 1974 · Trio, for violin, cello, and piano.
- 1980 · Sonatina, for flute and guitar.
- 1981 · Interplay, for flute, marimba and percussion.
- 1981 · Octet in three movements, for clarinet, bassoon, horn and string quintet.
- 1982 · Fantasy, for clarinet and piano.
- 1982 · Trio, for flute, viola and guitar.
- 1986 · Interplay II, for flute and harp.
- 1988 · Three for Three.
- 1992 · Sonate, for clarinet (in the key of A) and piano.
- 2003 · Trio, for violin, viola and cello (won 1st prize at the "William Lincer Foundation Chamber Music Competition" in 2003).
- 2003 · Wind Quartet, for wind quartet.
- 2006 · Quintet for Winds, for wind quartet.
- 2008 · Wind Quintet, for wind quartet.
- 2009 · Wind Quintet No. 2, for qind quartet.
- No Date · Four Pieces for Five Brass, for wind quartet.
- No Date · Sonate, for clarinet and piano.

=== Pieces for organ ===
- 1973 · Meditation on "Mary of Graces"
- 1973 · Meditation on "Mary's visit to the tomb of Christ"
- 1975 · Prelude "O God, Thou Art the Father"
- 1976 · Chorale
- 1978 · Service sonata
- 1980 · Orgelsonate nr. 2
- 1982 · Christmas sonata
- 1982 · Little organ pieces
- 1984 · Christ is the world's redeemer - a meditation
- No Date · Prelude and Aria

=== Pieces for piano ===
- 1969 · Sonate nr. 2
- 1971 · Coterie
- 1975 · Sonate nr. 3
- 1983 · Lenten preludes
- 1987 · Prelude, chaconne and toccata
- 1992 · Sonate nr. 4
- No Date · Coterie number 7

== Publications ==
- An Analysis of Olivier Messiaen's "Couleurs de la cite celeste", Thesis (Ph.D.) University of California, Santa Barbara, 1984. 40 p.
