= Smoky Mountain Brass Quintet =

Background information
- Origin: Western Carolina University
- Genres: Brass Quintet
- Years active: 1993–present
- Members: Brad Ulrich; David Ginn; Travis Bennett; Zsolt Szabo; Mike Schallock
- Past members: Dan Cherry; Alan Mattingly; Robert Kehrberg; Ken Kroesche
- Website: www.smbq.org

Smoky Mountain Brass Quintet is a brass quintet founded in 1993 and currently Quintet in Residence at Western Carolina University.

Since its founding in 1993, the Smoky Mountain Brass Quintet has entertained audiences around the world in nine countries on three continents in venues such as Weill Recital Hall at Carnegie Hall, and Shostakovich Philharmonia Hall. The Quintet performs a wide variety of music ranging from Early Renaissance to Jazz. In addition, works commissioned from regional composers such as Bruce Frazier, Michael Kallstrom and Robert Kehrberg have expanded the repertoire for all brass quintets.

The Smoky Mountain Brass Quintet is a non-profit, 501-c(3) organization whose mission is "to promote the understanding and enjoyment of music, particularly among the youth of western North Carolina, and to expand appreciation for the musical heritage of the Southern Appalachian region".

Among its many community service performances, the SMBQ has helped to raise money for the new public library, for the local arts council, and for the Jackson County band program. On an afternoon in 2007, the quintet hosted "Sunday in the Park" and helped raise $14,500 for National Alzheimer's Day.
