= Brass Quintet No. 2 (Goldenthal) =

"Brass Quintet No. 2" is a brass ensemble by Elliot Goldenthal. He composed it in 1980.

The quintet comes in three parts and is published as sheet music by G. Schirmer, Inc.

== Movements ==
There are three movements:

1. Quinque
2. Cortege
3. Rondo Burlesque

== Concerts ==
It was recently recorded by the brass ensemble Extension Ensemble for their 2004 album New York Presence.
