= Dallas Brass =

The Dallas Brass is an American brass quintet started by Michael Levine in 1983. Its repertoire contains patriotic music, classical, and romantic, among others.

The seven members of the group include Michael D. Levine (director), Brian Neal (trumpet), Luis Cárdenas (trumpet), Juan Berrios (horn), Ryan Christianson (trombone), Paul Carlson (tuba), and Craig Hill (percussion).

The Dallas Brass has performed for Presidents Gerald Ford and George H. W. Bush. The group has also made appearances with Cincinnati Pops, New York Pops, at Carnegie Hall, and around Europe. The Dallas Brass frequently travels to public schools to present clinics to students as well as work with them on a selection of music.

Six recordings of the Dallas Brass have been released: Debut, Dallas Brass II, A Merry Christmas with Brass, Windborne, Nutcracker, and American Musical Journey.
