= Robert Starer =

Austrian-born American composer & pianist (1924–2001)

Robert Starer (8 January 1924 in Vienna – 22 April 2001 in Kingston, New York) was an Austrian-born American composer, pianist and educator.

Robert Starer began studying the piano at age 4 and continued his studies at the Vienna State Academy. After the 1938 plebiscite in which Austria voted for annexation by Nazi Germany, Starer left for Palestine and studied at the Jerusalem Conservatory with Josef Tal. In World War II he served in the British Royal Air Force, and in 1947 he settled in the United States. He studied composition at the Juilliard School in New York City with Frederick Jacobi, then with Aaron Copland in 1948 and received a postgraduate degree from Juilliard in 1949. Starer became an American citizen in 1957.

Robert Starer taught at the Juilliard School, Brooklyn College and the Graduate Center of the City University of New York where he became a distinguished professor in 1986. He was married, had one child, Daniel, and resided in Woodstock, New York until his death. He lived with writer Gail Godwin for some thirty years; the two collaborated on several librettos.

Starer was prolific and composed in many genres. His music was characterized by chromaticism and driving rhythms. His vocal works, whether set to English or Hebrew texts, were particularly praised. He composed the score for Martha Graham's 1962 ballet Phaedra. He also wrote four operas, The Intruder (1956), Pantagleize (1967), The Last Lover (1975), and Apollonia (1979). Notable concertos include Violin Concerto which was written for Itzhak Perlman and recorded by the Boston Symphony Orchestra, Seiji Ozawa, conductor, and his Cello Concerto, commissioned by Janos Starker and recorded by Pro Arte Chamber Orchestra, Leon Botstein, conductor.

One of Starer's better-known pieces is Even and Odds for young pianists. He is also known for his pieces entitled Sketches in Color, as well as his sight-reading training manual, Rhythmic Training.

Among Starer's students was Talib Rasul Hakim.

Starer died on April 22, 2001, in Kingston New York, and he is buried in Artists Cemetery, Woodstock, Ulster County, New York.

== Other sources ==
- Jaques Cattell Press (Ed.): Who's who in American Music. Classical. First edition. R. R. Bowker, New York, 1983.
- Darryl Lyman: Great Jews in Music. J. D. Publishers, Middle Village, New York, 1986.
- Stanley Sadie, H. Wiley Hitchcock (Ed.): The New Grove Dictionary of American Music. Grove's Dictionaries of Music, New York, New York, 1986.
