= Eric Ewazen =

American composer and teacher (born 1954)

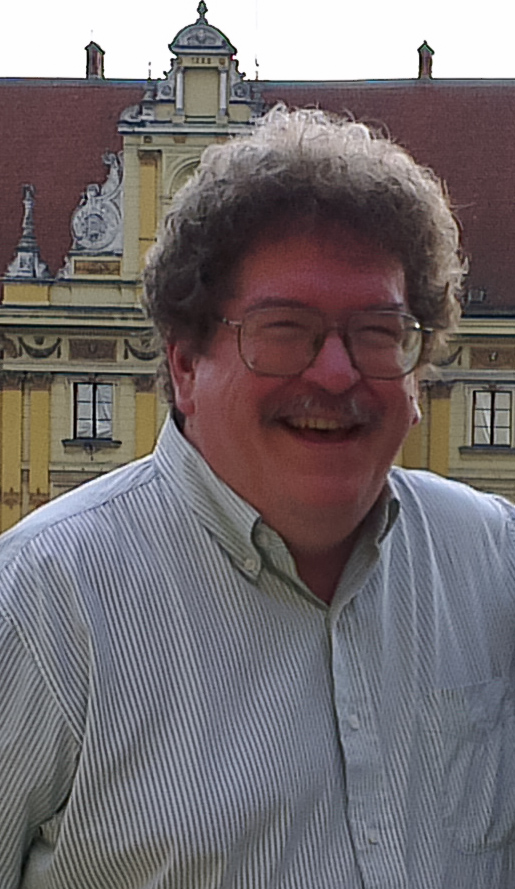
Eric Ewazen in 2012

Eric Ewazen (/ɪˈweɪzən/; born March 1, 1954, Cleveland, Ohio) is an American composer and teacher.

== Biography ==
Ewazen studied composition under Samuel Adler, Milton Babbitt, Gunther Schuller, Joseph Schwantner, Warren Benson, and Eugene Kurtz at the Eastman School of Music and The Juilliard School (where he received numerous composition awards, prizes, and fellowships). He has been on the faculty of The Juilliard School since 1980, and has been a lecturer for the New York Philharmonic's Musical Encounters Series. He has also served on the faculties of the Hebrew Arts School and the Lincoln Center Institute. He served as Vice President of the League of Composers – International Society for Contemporary Music from 1982–1989, and was also composer-in-residence for the Orchestra of St. Luke's.

== Music ==
Ewazen's compositions have been performed by numerous ensembles and orchestras around the world, such as the Cleveland Orchestra, and at festivals such as Woodstock, Tanglewood, Aspen, Caramoor, Tidewater, and the Music Academy of the West, among others. In recent years, he has increasingly written for brass instruments. Many of these works are performed regularly.

His works have been commissioned and performed by organizations such as the St. Luke's Chamber Ensemble, Greenwich Symphony, Fairfield Chamber Orchestra, American Brass Quintet, Borealis Wind Quintet, Bellevue Philharmonic, Detroit Chamber Winds, Western Piedmont Symphony, School for Strings, L'Amore di Musica, New York State Council on the Arts, the Philip-Morris Companies, Jerome Foundation, University of Arizona, University of Oklahoma, Music Academy of the West, and by soloists such as Julius Baker, Mindy Kaufman, Philip Smith, Joseph Alessi, and Eugene Becker (of the New York Philharmonic), Toni Lipton and Scott Brubaker (of the Metropolitan Opera), Olegna Fuschi, Rebecca Scott, James Houlik, Linda Strommen, and Leon Russianoff, among others.

The third movement of Ewazen's Symphony in Brass is used as the theme music for National Public Radio's political coverage.

== Recordings ==
Among his recorded works are the "Ballade for Clarinet, Harp & String Orchestra" (John Russo); "Colchester Fantasy" (American Brass Quintet on Summit Records); "Sonata for Viola and Piano" (Eugene Becker on Clique Trak), "Symphony in Brass" (Summit Brass on Summit Records); "The Tiger" (William White on Hyperion Records), "The Diamond World" (Ahn Trio), and Well-Tempered Productions has released an all-Ewazen disc of "Frost Fire", "...to cast a shadow again", "Quintet for Trumpet and Strings", "The Palace of Nine Perfections" (University of Oklahoma Percussion Ensemble), and "Sonata for Horn & Piano" featuring the American Brass Quintet, Chamber Ensemble of St. Luke's and Grammy winner William Sharp. In the fall of 1996, the principal chairs of the New York Philharmonic recorded a disc of Mr. Ewazen's music for Cala Records. There are three discs dedicated to his music on the Albany Records label: "Sejong Plays Ewazen" with the International Sejong Soloists, "Orchestral Music and Concertos" with the Czech Philharmonic Chamber Orchestra conducted by Paul Polivnick, and "Bass Hits," a collection of concert pieces for bass trombone and various ensembles.

== Partial list of works ==
For a more complete list of works see List of compositions by Eric Ewazen.

=== For orchestra or wind ensemble ===
- Chamber Symphony (1986)
- Legacy (2000)
- Flight (2001)
- A Hymn for the Lost and the Living (2001)
- Celtic Hymns and Dances (1990)
- Celebration of a Cherished Life (2002)
- Sinfonia for String Orchestra (2001)
- Overture to the School for Strings (2000)
- Celestial Dancers (2007)

=== Concerti ===
- Shadowcatcher – Concerto for Brass Quintet and Wind Ensemble (1996) [arr. for orchestra/piano]
- Concerto for Flute and Chamber Orchestra (1989)
- Down a River of Time – Oboe and String Orchestra (1999)
- Ballade for Clarinet, Harp, and String Orchestra (1986)
- Concerto for Trumpet and String Orchestra (1990)
- Danzante – Trumpet and Wind Ensemble (2004)
- Concerto for Tenor Trombone and Wind Ensemble (2001)
- Visions of Light – Tenor Trombone and Wind Ensemble (2003)
- Concerto for Tuba or Bass Trombone and Orchestra (1995)
- Concerto for Euphonium and Wind Ensemble (2003)
- Concerto for Marimba and String Orchestra (1999)
- Concerto for Violin and String Orchestra (1997)
- Concerto for Bassoon and Wind Ensemble (2002)
- Cascadian Concerto for Wind Quintet and Orchestra (2003)
- Concerto for Tenor Saxophone and Orchestra (1992)
- Concerto for Horn and String Orchestra (2002)
- Hold Fast Your Dreams – Oboe and Wind Ensemble (2010)
- Concerto for Bass Trombone and String Orchestra (1998)

=== Sonatas ===
- Sonata No. 1 for Flute and Piano (2011)
- Sonata No. 2 for Flute and Piano (2013)
- Sonata for Horn and Piano (1992)
- Sonata for Trombone and Piano (1993)
- Sonata for Trumpet and Piano (1995)
