= David Snow (composer) =

American composer (born 1954)

- Born: 1954 (age 71–72); United States
- Origin: Providence, Rhode Island
- Genres: Classical music
- Occupation: Composer

David Jason Snow (born 1954 in Providence, Rhode Island) is an American composer. Snow studied composition with Samuel Adler, Warren Benson, and Joseph Schwantner at the Eastman School of Music, Jacob Druckman at the Yale School of Music, and Arthur Berger and Martin Boykan at Brandeis University. At the Eastman School, Snow was awarded the Sernoffsky, McCurdy, and Howard Hanson prizes in composition; Yale awarded him a Bradley-Keeler Memorial Scholarship and the Frances E. Osborne Kellogg Prize in composition. Snow has been the recipient of awards, fellowships, residencies and commissions from BMI, the National Association of Composers/USA, the National Federation of Music Clubs, the Annapolis Fine Arts Foundation, the ASCAP Foundation, the College Band Directors Association, the National Endowment for the Arts, Res Musica Baltimore, the Maryland State Arts Council, the Renée B. Fisher Foundation, Trio Indiana, SoundMoves, Pastiche, the Arts Council of Montgomery County (Maryland), Yaddo, and the Millay Colony for the Arts.

== Music ==
Snow's music has been performed in concert by the Ensemble InterContemporain, the American Brass Quintet, the Manhattan Chamber Orchestra, the Eastman Percussion Ensemble, trumpeter Chris Gekker, violinist Penny Thompson Kruse, tubist Jay Rozen, and numerous other ensembles and solo artists. Snow has also produced recordings of electronic music, such as Larry, the Stooge in the Middle which received Musician magazine's Best Unsigned Band Award and Keyboard magazine's Ultimate Keyboard Competition Prize, and Three Studies for Two Disklaviers.

== Recordings ==
- Winter, Chris Gekker, trumpet, et al., Albany Records, 2004
- Wittgenstein Revisited, from Noises, Sounds and Strange Airs, Clique Track, 1993
- Dance Movements, fromNew American Brass, American Brass Quintet, Summit Records, 1992

== List of works ==
- Aubade/Nocture for soprano and piano (1973)
- Brass Quintet, 1974 (1974)
- Crystal Effusions for horn and piano (1974)
- Passacaglia for piano (1974)
- Merkabah, a song cycle for soprano and piano (1975)
- Buddha Breath for solo cello and orchestra (1976)
- Sonatina for trumpet and piano (1976)
- Effluvia, a chamber concerto for ten instruments (1976)
- Mirele for voice and piano (1976)
- Poor Mr. Cabbage! for two tubas and percussion, (1976)
- The Cynic in Springtime for medium voice and piano (1977)
- Eat This! for dancers and percussionist (1977)
- Trio for alto flute, contrabass, and piano (1977)
- Six Chinese Dishes for voice, flute, viola, roto-toms, and celesta (1977)
- The Passion and Transfiguration of a Post-Apocalyptic Eunuch, for tape (1978)
- Elephants Exotiques for four tubas (1978)
- Guernica for two brass quintets and concert band (1978)
- String Trio (1979)
- Reflections for mezzo-soprano, horn, and piano (1980)
- A Baker's Tale for narrator, clarinet, trumpet, violin, bassoon and piano (1980)
- Dance Movements for brass quintet (1981)
- Das Lakritzequartett for clarinet quartet (1982)
- Muted Suggestions for trumpet and marimba (1982)
- Sinfonia Concertante for horn, piano, percussion, and winds (1982)
- Dear Rozenkavalier for tuba and piano (1983)
- On Clearwater Mountain for trumpet, strings, harp, and timpani (1986)
- A Baker's Tale for concert band (transcribed from the chamber version, 1987)
- Heilbaddame aus Hoelle for soprano and boombox, 1990
- Ma Tovu for cantor and SATB choir (1989)
- Zog nit keynmol as du geyst me letstn veg, for soprano, clarinet, violin, cello and piano (1992)
- Wittgenstein Revisited, electroacoustic music for tape (1993)
- The Sound of One Shoe Dropping, for tape and optional performer (1993)
- Canzoni D'Amore (1994): I. The Joy of Cooking, for string bass; II. The Joy of Sex, for heavy metal tuba and karaoke system
- Marriage At Work, a musical comedy, with Paul Franklin Stregevsky (1996)
- Concertino Marcel Duchamp, for solo piano and digital audio tape (1996)
- Etude after Mondrian for solo piano (1997)
- Wedding March for string quartet (1998)
- L'Histoire du Patissier for clarinet, trumpet, piano and percussion (1999)
- At the Rebbe's Table for flute, clarinet, violin, cello and piano (1999)
- Winter for trumpet and piano (1999)
- A Shaynem Dank Dir Im Pupik for 3 tuba players (2000)
- Timor Timur for piano and recorded sound (2000)
- Hasana Tanz for solo 5-string violin and orchestra (2000)
- A Night in Jakarta for electric 5-string violin and recorded sound (2000)
- A Baker's Tale for piano and string orchestra (2000)
- Nice Girls Don't for violin, cello, piano, and recorded sound (2002)
- Orbits of the Henon Map for nine MIDI-controlled toy pianos (2003)
- Three Studies for Two Disklaviers (2008)
- The Brass Ring for trumpet and piano (2008)
