= American Brass Quintet =

Chamber music ensemble

The American Brass Quintet is an American brass quintet founded in 1960. Unlike conventional brass quintets, the bass voice is provided by a bass trombone rather than a tuba. The Quintet has served as Ensemble-in-Residence at the Aspen Music Festival and School since 1970 and at the Juilliard School since 1987.

== Members ==
=== Current ===
- Tiago Linck — trumpet (since 2025)
- Brandon Ridenour — trumpet (since 2023)
- Eric Reed — French horn
- Hillary Simms — tenor trombone (since 2023)
- John Rojak — bass trombone

=== Past ===
Previous members are:

==== Trumpet ====
- Robert Heinrich (1960-1964)
- Theodore Weis (1960-1962)
- Ronald Anderson (1962-1965)
- Allan Dean (1964-1965)
- John Eckert (1965-1970)
- Gerard Schwarz (1965-1973)
- Louis Ranger (1970-1978)
- Raymond Mase (1973-2013)
- John Aley (1978-1981)
- Chris Gekker (1981-1998)
- Louis Hanzlik (2013–2022)

==== Horn ====
- Arthur Goldstein (1960-1962)
- Daniel Cowan (1962-1963)
- Richard Happe (1963-1965)
- Edward R. Birdwell (1965-1976)
- David Wakefield (1976-2014)

==== Trombone ====
- Gilbert Cohen (1960-1963)
- Arnold Fromme (1960-1970)
- Douglas Edelman (1970-1972)
- Herb Rankin (1972-1977)
- Ronald Borror (1977-1983)
- Michael Powell (1983–2022)

==== Bass Trombone ====
- Robert Biddlecome (1963-1990)

== History ==
In its early days, the Quintet sought to differentiate itself from other brass quintets by dedicating itself to "music originally written for brass," and substituted a bass trombone for the conventional tuba voice.

The Quintet has toured extensively, giving concerts in Europe, Central and South America, Asia, Australia, and all fifty of the United States.

The Quintet's repertoire blends classical works, often arranged by its members for modern performance by a brass quintet, with new works it has commissioned from contemporary composers including Samuel Adler, Bruce Adolphe, Daniel Asia, Jan Bach, Robert Beaser, William Bolcom, Elliott Carter, Billy Childs, Robert Dennis, Jacob Druckman, Eric Ewazen, Anthony Plog, Huang Ruo, David Sampson, Gunther Schuller, William Schuman, Ralph Shapey, Joan Tower, Melinda Wagner, and Charles Whittenberg. The group has released recordings of over twenty-five new works for brass quintet.

== Teaching ==
The Quintet has been in residence at the Juilliard School since 1987 and at the Aspen Music Festival since 1970. It has established residencies at music departments in the US, including the University at Buffalo in 2008. Many young ensembles, including the Extension Ensemble, Manhattan Brass Quintet, Meridian Arts Ensemble, and Urban Brass Quintet have worked with the Quintet through these residencies. Since 2001 the group has offered a program of mini-residencies as part of its regular touring season with the aim of offering young musicians an intense chamber music experience over several days.

== Awards ==
The Quintet was the 2013 recipient of Chamber Music America's highest honor, the Richard J. Bogomolny National Service Award for significant and lasting contributions to the field.

== See also ==
- Canadian Brass
- Brass Quintet Repertoire
- Brass instrument
