= Myron Fink =

American opera composer (1932–2026)

Myron Samuel Fink (April 19, 1932 – July 30, 2026) was an American composer of opera and other pieces for voice, piano, and chamber ensemble. His compositions have been performed around the world. The Sousa Archives and Center for American Music holds the Myron Fink Music Collection, 1961–2008.

== Life and career ==
Myron Samuel Fink was born on April 19, 1932, in Chicago, Illinois. His early musical education was shaped by prominent instructors, including Felix Borowski and Mario Castelnuovo-Tedesco. Fink pursued formal studies at the Juilliard School of Music in New York, where he studied under Bernard Wagenaar, and at the University of Illinois, studying with Burrill Phillips. He earned a Bachelor of Music degree in 1954 and a Master of Music in 1955 from the University of Illinois. Subsequently, he was awarded a Woodrow Wilson Memorial Fellowship, allowing him to study with Robert Palmer at Cornell University during 1954–55. Furthering his education, Fink received a Fulbright Scholarship to study at the Staats-Akademie der Musik in Vienna from 1955 to 1956.

Fink died in California on July 30, 2026, at the age of 94.

== Operas ==
- 1954 The Boor
- 1956 Susanna and the Elders
- 1961 Jeremiah
- 1969 Judith and Holofernes
- 1981 Chinchilla
- 1985 The Island of Tomorrow
- 1997 The Conquistador
- 2000 Animalopera
- 2003 Edith Wharton: A self portrait
