= Johnny Glasel =

American jazz musician

Joseph Samuel Glasel (born 1930, Manhattan, New York) known professionally as Johnny Glasel, was an American jazz trumpeter.

Glasel played with Bob Wilber in the 1940s. He attended the Yale School of Music in the 1950s, then played in the New Haven Symphony Orchestra and chamber music ensembles in performances with jazz musicians. In New York City, he was a member of a Glenn Miller tribute band led by Ray McKinley. He performed in orchestras on Broadway and at Radio City Music Hall. He released several albums during the 1950s and 1960s. Glasel was also a founding member of the New York Brass Quintet.

In addition to his work with Gil Evans (most notably on Into the Hot), he recorded extensively as a pop session musician and often did so uncredited. He is known to have played with John Denver and Astrud Gilberto.

Glasel became president of Local 802 of the New York City Musicians' Union early in the 1980s, maintaining the position until 1992. He was secretary of Health Care for All/NJ and was appointed by Gov. Jon Corzine to serve on the New Jersey Health Care Access Study Commission. He wrote about health care reform and other social issues. He lived in New Jersey. Glasel died in the early morning hours of December 8, 2011.

== Discography ==
=== As leader ===
- Jazz Session (ABC-Paramount, 1957)
- Jazz Unlimited (Jazz Unlimited 1961)

=== As sideman ===
With Sidney Bechet

- The Grand Master of the Soprano Saxophone and Clarinet (Columbia, 1956)
- New Orleans Style Old and New (Commodore, 1952)
- Sidney Bechet with His Quartet and Bob Wilber's Wildcats (Columbia, 1954)

With Astrud Gilberto

- I Haven't Got Anything Better to Do (Verve, 1969)
- Una Lagrima (Verve, 1969)

With Bill Russo

- School of Rebellion (Roulette, 1960)
- Seven Deadly Sins (Roulette, 1960)

With The Six

- The Six (Norgran, 1954)
- The Six (Bethlehem, 1955)
- The View from Jazzbo's Head (Bethlehem, 1956)
- The Six: An Evening of Jazz (Norgran, 1956)

With others

- Gil Evans, Into the Hot (Impulse!, 1962)
- Roberta Flack, Chapter Two (Atlantic, 1970)
- Arnold Franchetti/Hunter Johnson, Three Italian Masques/Trio for Flute, Oboe and Piano (CRI, 1959)
- Barry Miles, Miles of Genius (Charlie Parker, 1962)
- Eddy Mitchell, Made in USA (Barclay, 1975)
- Mel Powell, The Mel Powell Bandstand (Vanguard, 1954)
- Walter Wanderley, When It Was Done (A&M/CTI, 1969)
- Alec Wilder/Don Hammond, 2 Contemporary Composers (Golden Crest, 1960)
