= Chicago Brass Quintet =

American musical ensemble

The Chicago Brass Quintet is a five-piece brass quintet from Chicago, Illinois, formed in 1963 (sometimes credited as 1964), and still active. They have toured worldwide since 1980 and can be heard on recordings on the Crystal, Delos (now on Naxos) and the Centaur labels. The quintet is represented by Center Stage Artists. "The Chicago Brass Quintet has established itself as one of the best brass quintet's in the world."

Line-up

- Ross Beacraft - trumpet
- Matthew Gaunt- tuba
- Sharon Jones - French horn
- Adam Moen - trombone
- Matthew Lee - trumpet
