= Robert Nagel =

American classical composer

Robert Nagel (September 29, 1924 – June 5, 2016) was an American trumpet player, composer, and teacher. He was an early advocate for brass chamber music, especially the brass quintet. Nagel was the founder and director of the New York Brass Quintet, as well as a founding member of the International Trumpet Guild. He served as a faculty member of the Yale School of Music from 1957 - 1988. As a composer and arranger, Nagel wrote solo and small ensemble music, trumpet method books, and orchestral works.

== Biography ==
Nagel was born in Freeland, Pennsylvania. At the age of 8, he began playing the trumpet as part of a school band program. At the age of 13, Nagel performed a cornet solo on a national radio broadcast with the Armco Band. Nagel studied composition at Juilliard with Peter Mennin and Vincent Persichetti, while also receiving instruction during the summer at Tanglewood with Aaron Copland. After graduation, Nagel worked as a freelance trumpet player in New York City, performing with radio orchestras such as the NBC Symphony Orchestra.

After World War II, Nagel became interested in smaller ensemble music, performing with the New York Brass Ensemble. After the group disbanded in the early 1950s, Nagel reorganized the group as the New York Brass Quintet in 1954. As a founding member of the International Trumpet Guild, Nagel promoted the composition and arrangement of new music for brass instruments, especially the brass quintet. Nagel also composed music and formed his own publishing company, Mentor Music, in 1959.

From 1957 until 1988, Nagel was a faculty member of the Yale School of Music as a trumpet instructor. He also taught at the New England Conservatory of Music, Juilliard, the Manhattan School of Music, the Hartt School, the University of North Carolina School of the Arts, Rutgers University, and the University of South Carolina.

== List of works ==
=== Original works ===
- Divertimento for winds (1951)
- Concerto for Trumpet (1958)
- Trumpets of Spain (1958)
- This Old Man: March for brass quintet (1960)
- Trumpet processional (1963)
- Brass Trio No. 1 (1953)
- Brass Trio No. 2 (1966)
- Suite for Brass and Piano (1971)
- Concertino for brass quintet (1999)

=== Arrangements ===
- Baroque music for trumpet (1969)
- The regal trumpet: music of the baroque (1971)
- Great mountain, brilliant land: from Central Province folk songs (1983)

=== Brass Method Books ===
- Speed studies for trumpet (horn or clarinet) (1965)
- Rhythmic studies for trumpet (1968)
- Trumpet studies in contemporary music (1975)
- Trombone studies in contemporary music (1977)
- Trumpet Skills (1982)
