= Charles Whittenberg =

- Born: July 6, 1927; St. Louis, Missouri, U.S.
- Died: August 22, 1984 (aged 57); Hartford, Connecticut, U.S.
- Education: Eastman School of Music (BM)
- Musical career
- Genre: Classical
- Occupations: Musician, composer
- Instrument: Percussion

Charles Whittenberg (July 6, 1927 – August 22, 1984) was an American composer and holder of two Guggenheim Fellowships.

He was born in St. Louis, Missouri, and graduated from the Eastman School of Music in 1948 with a Bachelor of Music in composition and percussion. A New York City resident from 1950, his music has been performed with increasing frequency in major musical centers of the US and Europe. He served as guest lecturer on electronic music and serial techniques at the University of Massachusetts, as an affiliate of the Columbia-Princeton Electronic Music Center, and Instructor of instrumental techniques at the Summer Institute of Bennington College, Vermont.

In more recent years he served on the faculty of the University of Connecticut at Storrs. Among his works is an important brass quintet entitled Triptych, commissioned by the American Brass Quintet in 1960. Among his notable students was Talib Rasul Hakim.

He died, aged 57, in 1984 in Hartford, Connecticut, from heart disease.
