= Jean-François Bellon =

19th-century French classical violinist and composer

Jean-François Victor Bellon (30 May 1795 in Lyon – 2 March 1869 in the 11th arrondissement of Paris) was a 19th-century French classical violinist and composer.

== Biography ==
Because of the Battle of Waterloo in 1815, his training at the Conservatoire de Paris was delayed and he did not return until 1823. He immediately won the first prize for violin. There, he also composed his first pieces.

Bellon then played in many popular Parisian orchestras. He is the inventor of a type of sourdine for the violin and the cello, which he patented, and of which some examples are preserved in the Musée du Conservatoire de Paris. Conductor of the Philippe Musard's orchestra in Paris, he relied on the section in brass of this ensemble that he formed for the performance of his 12 quintets.

== Bibliography ==
- Florence Gétreau, Aux origines du musée de la musique: les collections instrumentales du Conservatoire de Paris : 1793-1993, Klincksieck, 1996, p. 202
- Gérard Streletski, Le quintette de cuivres: aspects historiques et actualité, Symétrie, 2006, p. 58
- Stewart Pollens, Stradivari, 2010, Cambridge University Press, p. 141
