= Éric Aubier =

French classical trumpeter

Éric Aubier (born 1960) is a French classical concert trumpeter.

== Life ==
Having entered Maurice André's class at the age of 14 at the Conservatoire de Paris, of which he is still the youngest graduate, Aubier is also a winner of international competitions in Prague, Toulon and Paris. At the age of 19, he was appointed soloist at the Paris Opera orchestra by Rolf Liebermann. Since 1995, he has devoted himself exclusively to a career as an international concert performer and teacher. With Thierry Escaich, he forms a very original trumpet and organ duo.

Today, Aubier embodies the modern French trumpet and the French wind school, which he helps to promote internationally. He has created more than 25 works of which he is the dedicatee, by composers Bacri, Escaich, Jolas, Grätzer, Matalon...

In 2012, with the French Republican Guard Band, Harmony and string orchestra, he began a collaboration of several records. An album dedicated to Henri Tomasi was released at the end of 2012, and a third dedicated to Beffa, Copland, and Planel, in spring 2014.

His discography is rich with more than a hundred works for the firms Sony Classical, Universal, Calliope, Bis record companies… Since 2006, Éric Aubier has recorded exclusively for Indésens records.

He performs in prestigious venues: Teatro Colon, Suntory Hall, Salle Pleyel, Théâtre des Champs-Élysées... in a repertoire ranging from Haydn and Hummel to Tomasi, Jolivet, Escaich, Bacri or Beffa.

== Discography ==
- Rhapsody in Blue with the French Republican Guard Band, dir. François Boulanger (2013) - Gershwin - Arutiunian - Rimsky-Korsakov (Indésens INDE058)
- Henri Tomasi with Fabrice Millischer and the French Republican Guard Band, dir. François Boulanger (2012): concertos for trumpet, and for trombone - les Noces de Cendres - (nouveauté 2012 - world premiere with harmony orchestra - INDE050)
- Unlimited with Thierry Escaich, organ: 2 CDs: Bacri - Escaich - Tomasi - Jevtic - Improvisations - Bach - Mozart - Gounod - Franck - Christmas Medley - Spirituals - Bizet (INDE025)
- 5 grands Concertos français - Tomasi - Jolivet - Chaynes - Desenclos (world premiere) Orchestre du Théâtre National de l'Opéra de Paris - Marius Constant conductor. (INDE001)
- Balade impressionniste with Pascal Gallet, piano: Enesco - Ibert - Ravel - Debussy - Fauré - Gaubert - Tailleferre - Scriabine (INDE014)
- Classic trumpet concertos: Haydn - Hummel - Bach - Mozart - Telemann (INDE018)
- Rossini: Famous Opera arias - The Barber of Sevilla, La scala di seta, L'italiana in Algeri, Tancredi… Orchestre Radio Télévision Roumaine - Conductor: Amaury du Closel (indésens INDE007)
- La trompette française - Bacri - Escaich - Enesco - Tomasi - Schmitt - Honegger - Delerue - Charlier (eight world premieres) Orchestre National de Bretagne - F.X Bilger conductor
- André Jolivet: the trumpet work - Complete trumpet work (world premiere); Thierry Escaich: organ - Didier Vérité: percussion Orchestre de Région Avignon Provence, conductor: François-Xavier Bilger - Paris Opera orchestra, conductor: M. Constant (indésens INDE019 - available iTunes only)
- Musique française pour trompette et percussion - Betsy Jolas (EA) - Level (Les Gémeaux) - Jolivet (Heptade) - Naulais (Obsessions)- Didier Vérité: percussion, marimba, vibraphone
- La trompette romantique - Mahler - Rachmaninov - Tchaikovski - Brandt - Boehme - Gounod - Bellini - organ: Thierry Escaich -
- Concerti italiani - Vivaldi La Notte - Marcello - Albinoni - Cimarosa - Bellini (Orchestre National de Chambre de Toulouse) - conductor Alain Moglia
- Six concertos baroques pour trompette - Live CD - Albinoni - Hertel - Telemann - Torelli - Purcell - Tartini - Paul Kuentz's chamber orchestra
- Eric Aubier and friends - Baroc concerti for 1 to 6 trumpets Fasch - Vivaldi - Molter - Telemann - Perti -Vejvanovský - Stoelzel, Paul Kuentz's chamber orchestra - Éric Aubier - Nicolas André - Marc Geujon - David Rouault... trumpets
- Toot Suite by Claude Bolling - Suite for trumpet and jazz trio premiered by Maurice André. Éric Aubier: trumpet, flugelhorn, trumpet piccolo - Piano: Hervé Sellin - Drums: André Ceccarelli - Bass: Ricardo Del Fra (indésens)
- Les maîtres de la trompette/trumpet masters (Maurice André & Éric Aubier) - G. Ph. Telemann's Trumpet Concerto in D major - Johann Nepomuk Hummel's Trumpet Concerto.
