= Clément Saunier =

French classical trumpeter (born 1979)

Clément Saunier (born 1979) is a French classical trumpeter.

== Life ==
Born in La Rochelle, Saunier began learning the trumpet at the School of Municipal Music in Surgères with Christian Méchin.

From the age of 13 to 16, he was a student of Pierre Gillet, Gérard Boulanger and Pierre Thibaud.

At the age of 16, he entered the Conservatoire de Paris where he obtained his First Prizes for trumpet (Clément Garrec and Pierre Gillet's classes) and chamber music (Jens MacManama's class) unanimously with the jury's congratulations. He also pursued a further training cycle at the CNSMDP.

Saunier has been the principal trumpet of Pierre Boulez' Ensemble Intercontemporain since 2013 and collaborates with composers and conductors such as Matthias Pintscher, Péter Eötvös, Simon Rattle, Pablo Heras-Casado, Yan Maresz, Martín Matalon, and Pascal Dusapin. He has performed as a soloist at the Philharmonie de Paris in Yan Maresz' Metallics and Metal Extensions and Henze's Requiem at the Berliner Festspiele, Hamburg, the Cité de la Musique of Paris and the Cologne Philharmonic in Matthias Pintscher's Sonic Eclipse cycle and also the Berlin Philharmonic in Chute d'étoiles with the Berliner Rundfunk.

His performances at international interpretation competitions have been awarded prestigious prizes in Porcia (Italy 2002), Prague Spring (2003), Jeju (South Korea 2004), Théo Charlier International Trumpet Solo Competition (Brussels 2005), Maurice André (Paris 2003 and 2006) and Tchaikovsky (Moscow 2011). He was also honoured at the All England Masters International Brass Band Championships in Cambridge (England 2008) where he received the prize for best soloist for his performance with the Aeolus Brass Band. He also distinguished himself with the Trombamania Quintet at the international chamber music competitions in Guebwiller (2003), Passau (Germany 2004), and Illzach (2005)

An international concert performer, Saunier gives numerous concerts and recitals on the French and international stages (in Italy, Japan, South Korea, Slovakia, Taiwan, Ukraine, Colombia, Russia, the USA, Belgium, Germany...).

In 1998, he founded the Academy of Brass and Percussions of Surgères, which he coordinates and which now welcomes 150 participants each summer under the supervision of an international teaching team.

His discography includes several recordings, including a version of André Jolivet's second Trumpet Concerto (2005) recorded with La Musique des Gardiens de la Paix of Paris conducted by Philippe Ferro as well as a recording of Ida Gotkovsky's Concerto (2009). He also recorded with Trombamania and the Aeolus Brass Band.

In 2008, he collaborated with the Cristal Records label to record a collection of educational DVD-ROMs in 3 volumes containing 250 reference works from the repertoire for trumpet and piano for trumpet players of all levels.

Between 2007 and 2009, he recorded a solo album with prestigious ensembles throughout Europe, including the English Chamber Orchestra and the Amici Musicae in Leipzig. This CD includes the recording of Tomasi's Concerto for trumpet and orchestra.

The disc Tournoiement des songes (2013) includes a premiere by Anthony Girard, and the recording of his Trumpet Concerto, Lalo Schifrin's Concerto, a new version of Charles Chaynes' first Concerto for Trumpet and "reed orchestra" as well as the recording of Roger Boutry's Concerto in five movements.

The record Directions (2017) includes modern pieces for trumpet alone by Henze, Takemitsu, Scelsi, Fedele, Peter Maxwell Davies, Pintscher.

In 2015, he was appointed to the Conservatoire à rayonnement régional de Paris and the Pôle Supérieur Paris-Boulogne. Since 2015, he has also been teaching every summer at the Chosen Vale Institute (NH-USA) with great soloists and trumpet teachers (Edward Caroll, Håkan Hardenberger, Marco Blaauw, Gabriel Cassone, Thomas Stevens, Steven Burns, Markus Stockhausen, Tom Hooten, Pacho Flores). From 2013 to 2017, he taught at the Lucerne Orchestra Academy in Switzerland.

He teaches at the Lyon National Supérieur Conservatoire since 2021.

Saunier plays the Antoine Courtois trumpets that he developed for the brand.
