= Thionville =

Thionville Diddenhuewen (Luxembourgish) Diedenhofen (German)
- Subprefecture and commune
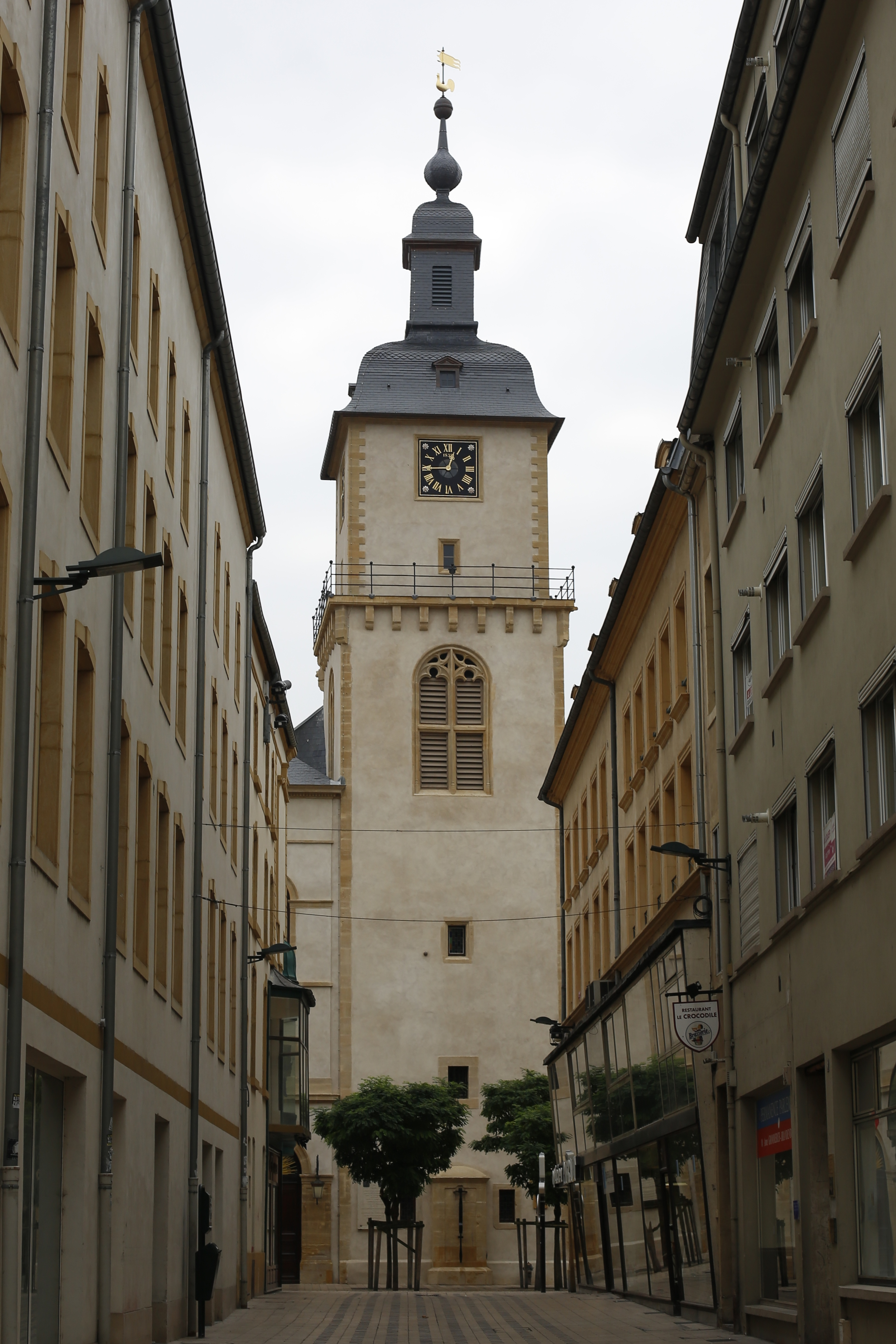
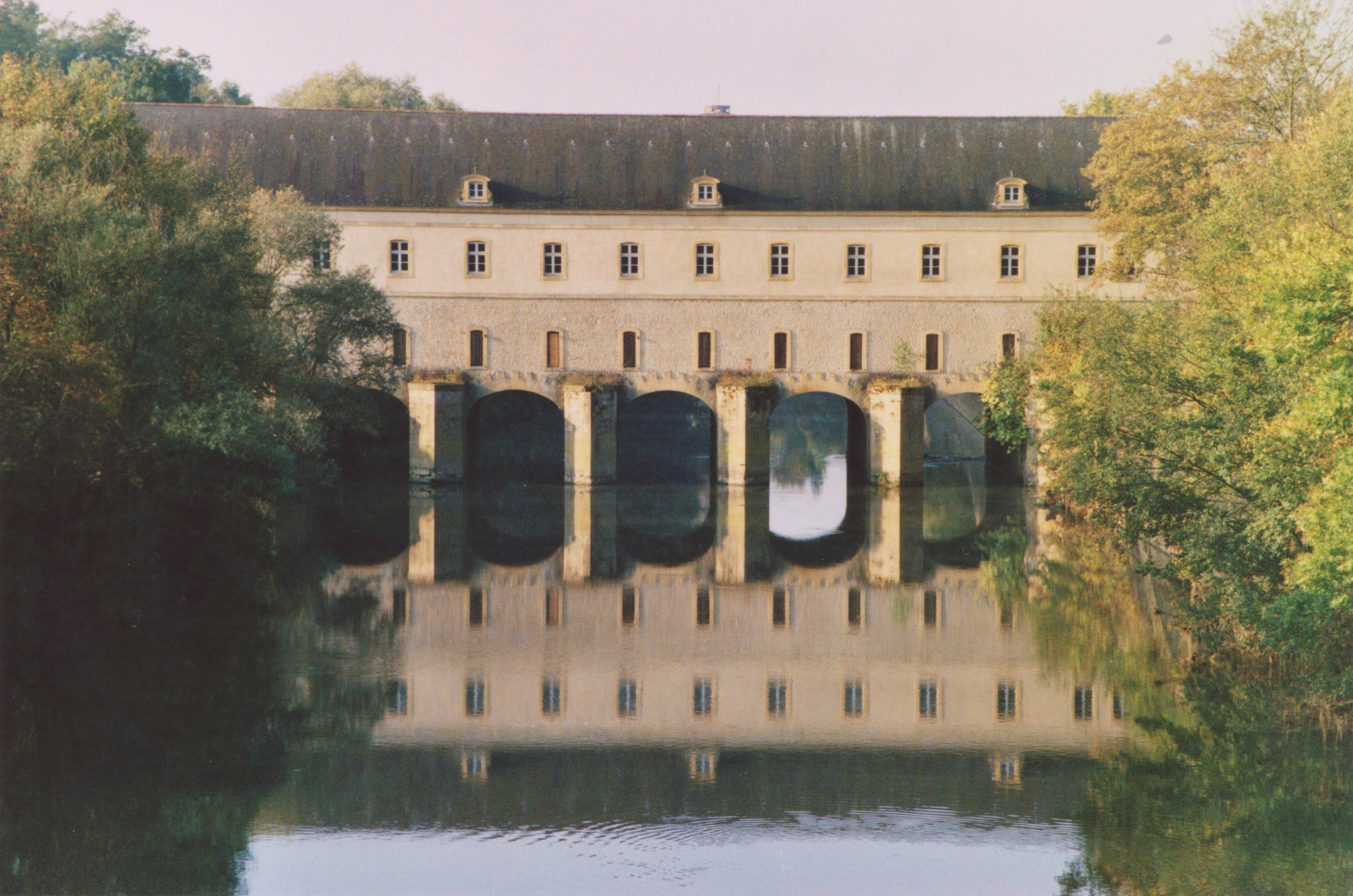
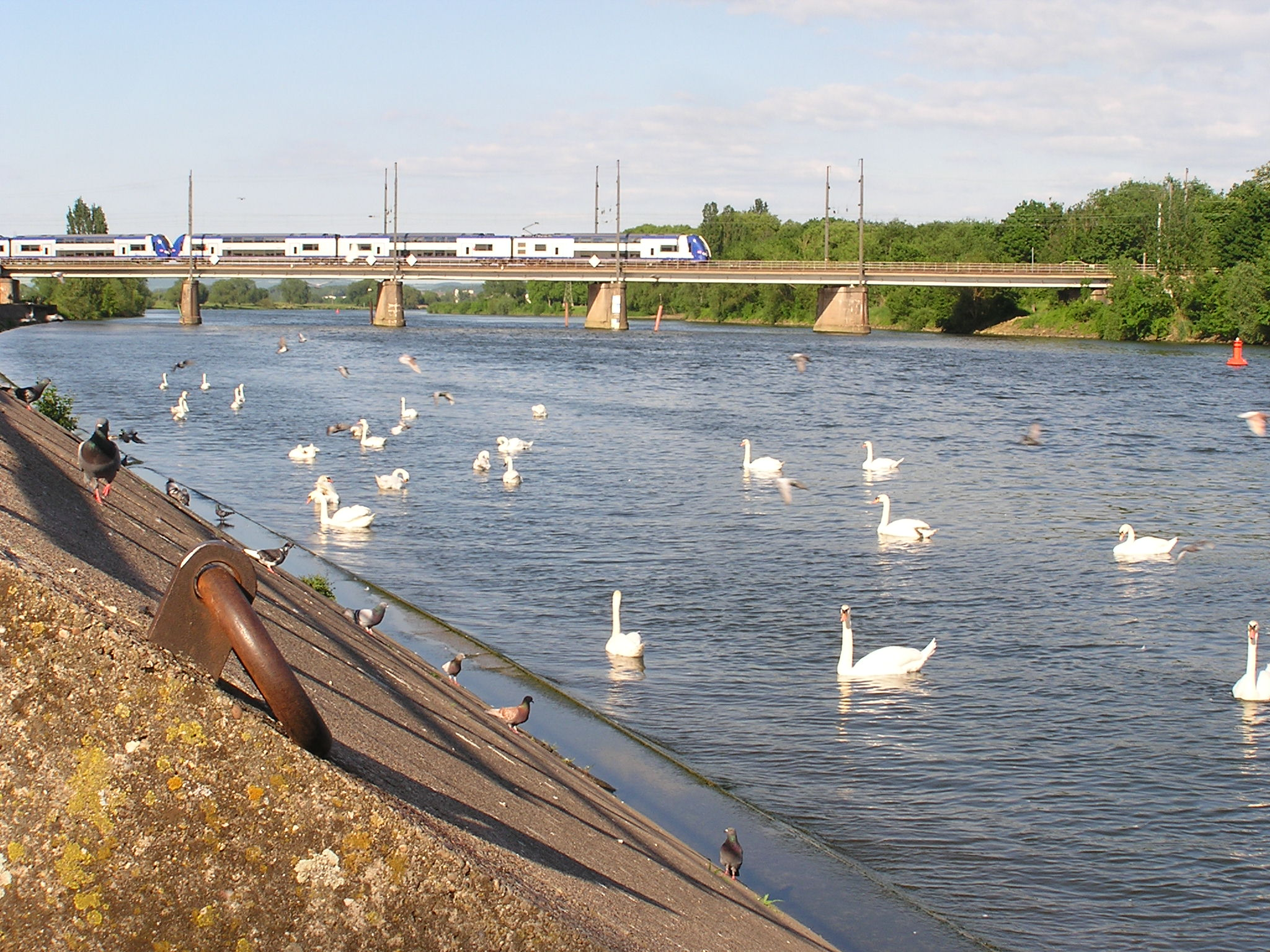
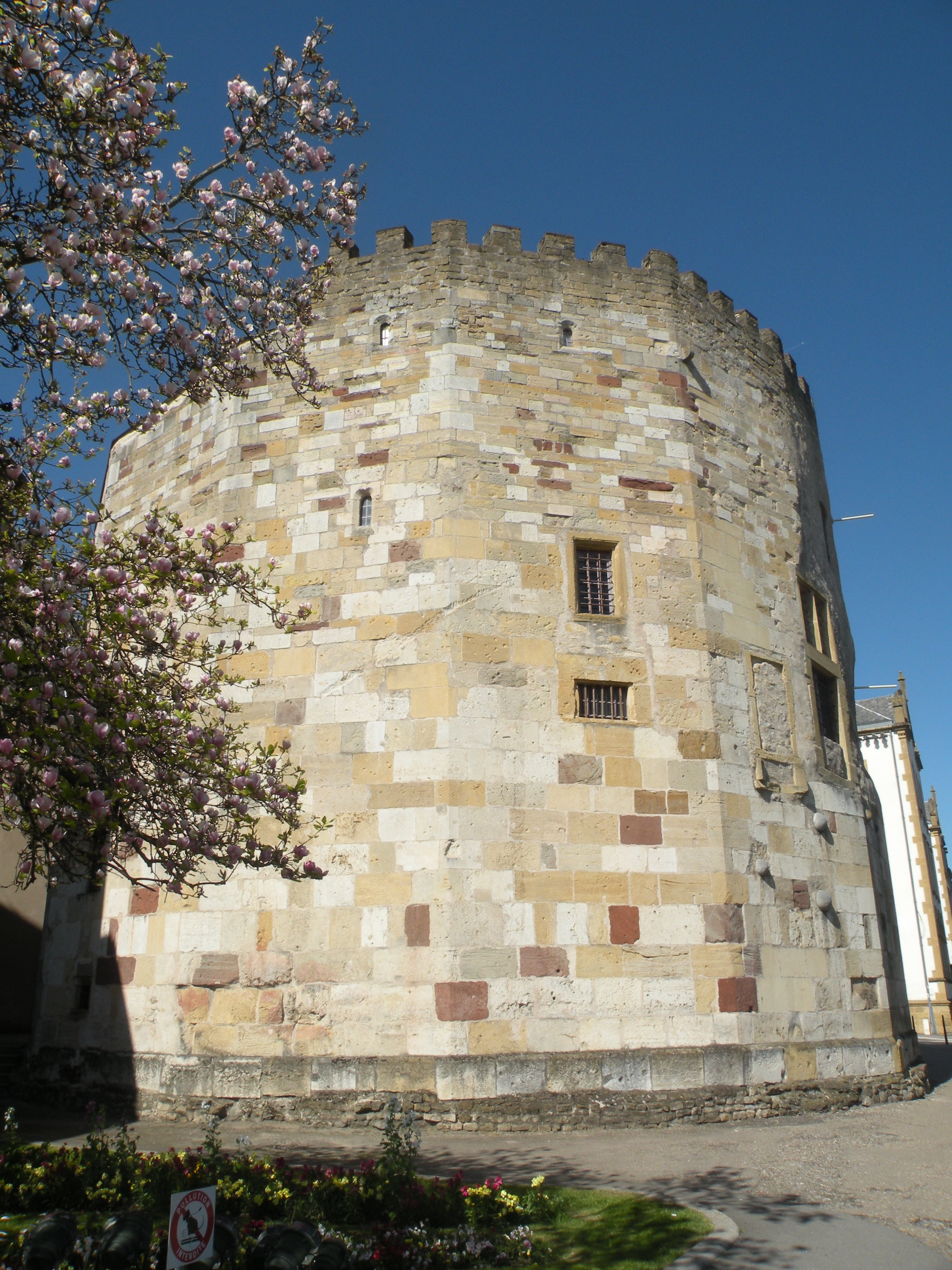
- Top to bottom, left to right: Beffroi de Thionville; Les ponts écluses; la rive de la Moselle; Tour aux Puces

- Coat of arms
- Location of Thionville
- Location within France Location within Grand Est
- Coordinates: 49°21′32″N 6°10′09″E
- Country: France
- Region: Grand Est
- Department: Moselle
- Arrondissement: Thionville
- Canton: Thionville, Yutz
- Intercommunality: CA Portes de France-Thionville

Government
  - Mayor (2020–2026): Pierre Cuny (DVC)
- Area^{1}: 49.86 km^{2} (19.25 sq mi)
- Elevation: 150 m (490 ft)
- Highest elevation: 423 m (1,388 ft)
- Lowest elevation: 147 m (482 ft)
- Population (2023): 42,658
  - Density: 855.6/km^{2} (2,216/sq mi)
- Time zone: UTC+01:00 (CET)
  - Summer (DST): UTC+02:00 (CEST)
- INSEE/Postal code: 57672 /57100
- ^{1} French Land Register data, which excludes lakes, ponds, glaciers > 1 km^{2} (0.386 sq mi or 247 acres) and river estuaries.

Thionville (French pronunciation: [tjɔ̃vil]; Luxembourgish: Diddenuewen [ˈdidənu̯əvən]; German: Diedenhofen [ˈdiːdn̩ˌhoːfn̩]) is a city in the northeastern French department of Moselle. The city is located on the left bank of the river Moselle, opposite its suburb Yutz.

== History ==
Thionville was settled as early as the time of the Merovingians. After the fall of the Western Roman Empire, the region was inhabited by the Germanic Alamanni. It was known in the Latin of that era as Theudonevilla or Totonisvilla. King Pepin the Short had a royal palace constructed here.

The Synod of Thionville was held here beginning on 2 February 835. It reinstated Emperor Louis the Pious and reversed his former conviction on crimes — none of which he actually committed — and deposed the Archbishop of Rheims, Ebbo. The Synod was composed of 43 bishops. On 28 February 835, in Mainz, Ebbo admitted that Louis had not committed the crimes of which he had been indicted and for which he had been deposed as Holy Roman Emperor.

From the 10th century onward, the area was part of the Holy Roman Empire. It was in possession of the House of Luxembourg until 1462 and then, until 1477, of the Duke of Burgundy. From 1477 to 1643, it was Habsburg territory.

Eskil, Archbishop of Lund, was imprisoned at Diedenhofen (at the instigation of the Archbishop of Bremen?) upon his return from his 1153 pilgrimage to Rome.

The Siege of Thionville in June 1639 occurred as part of the Thirty Years' War. The Hôtel de Ville was completed in 1641.

In 1659 Diedenhofen was annexed by France. Fortifications were constructed under the direction of Sébastien de Vauban.

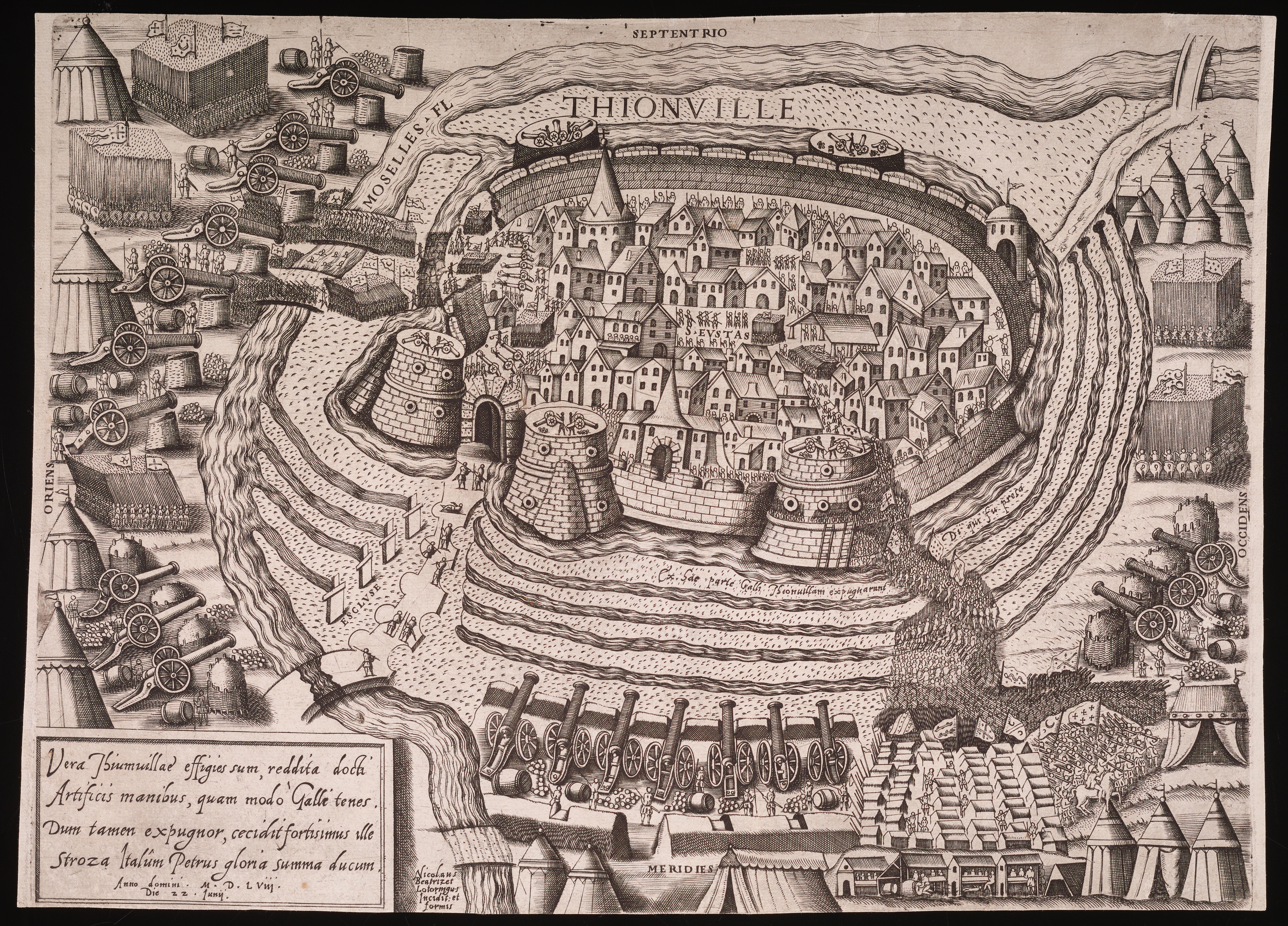
View of the 1558 siege of Thionville by Nicolas Beatrizet, in the Franco Novacco Collection at the Newberry Library

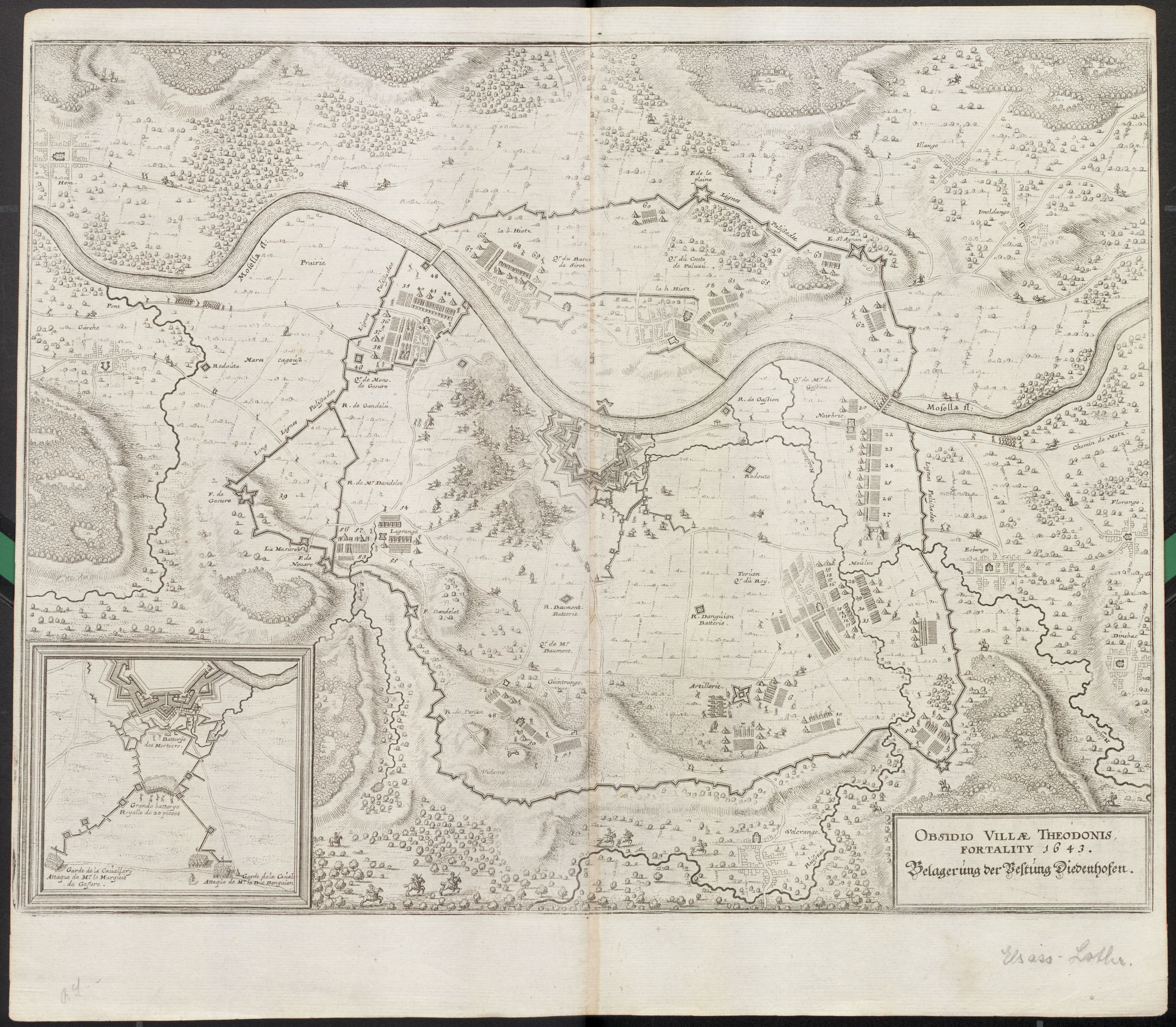
Siege of Thionville 1643

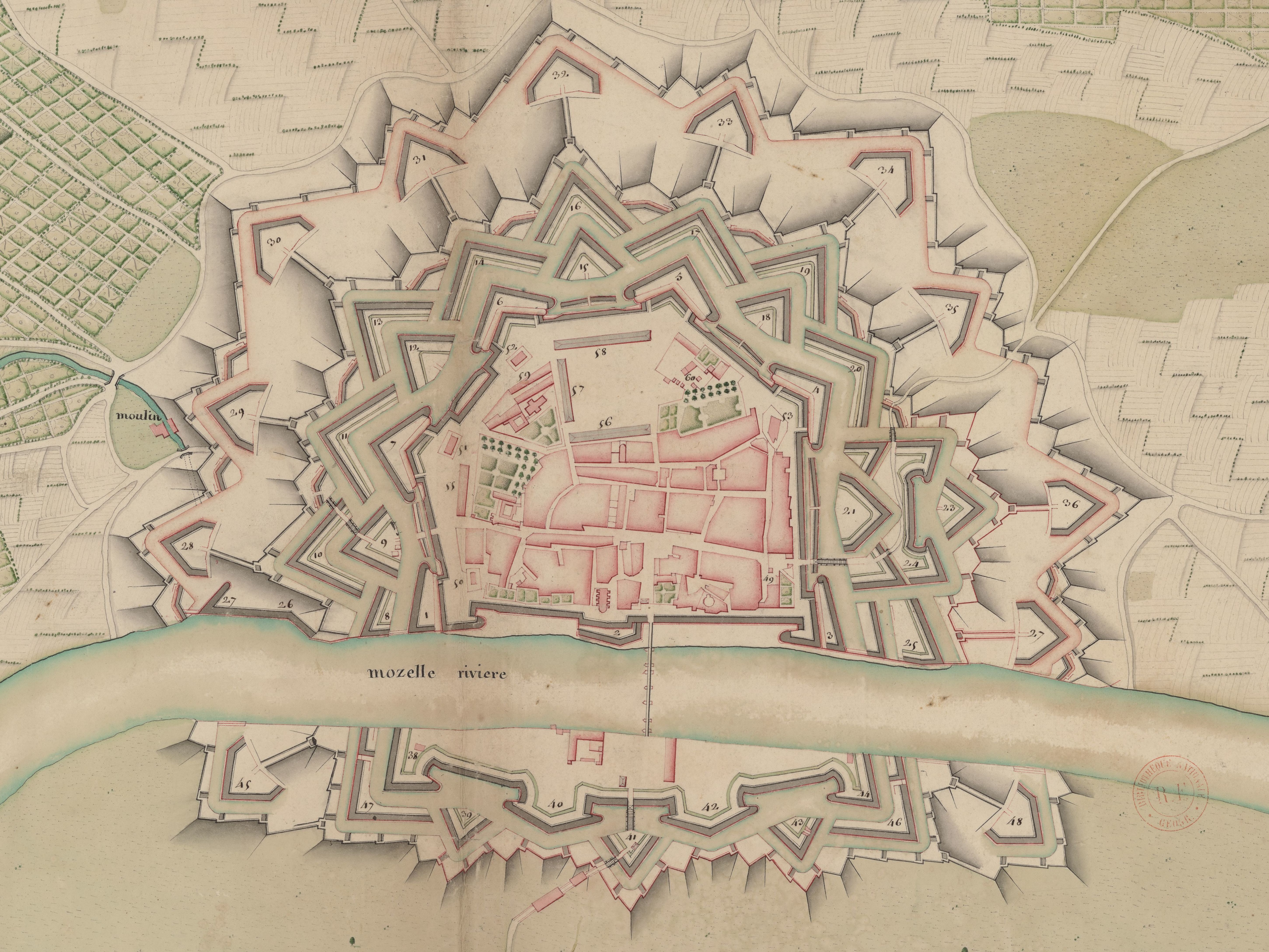
Plan de Thionville, 1741

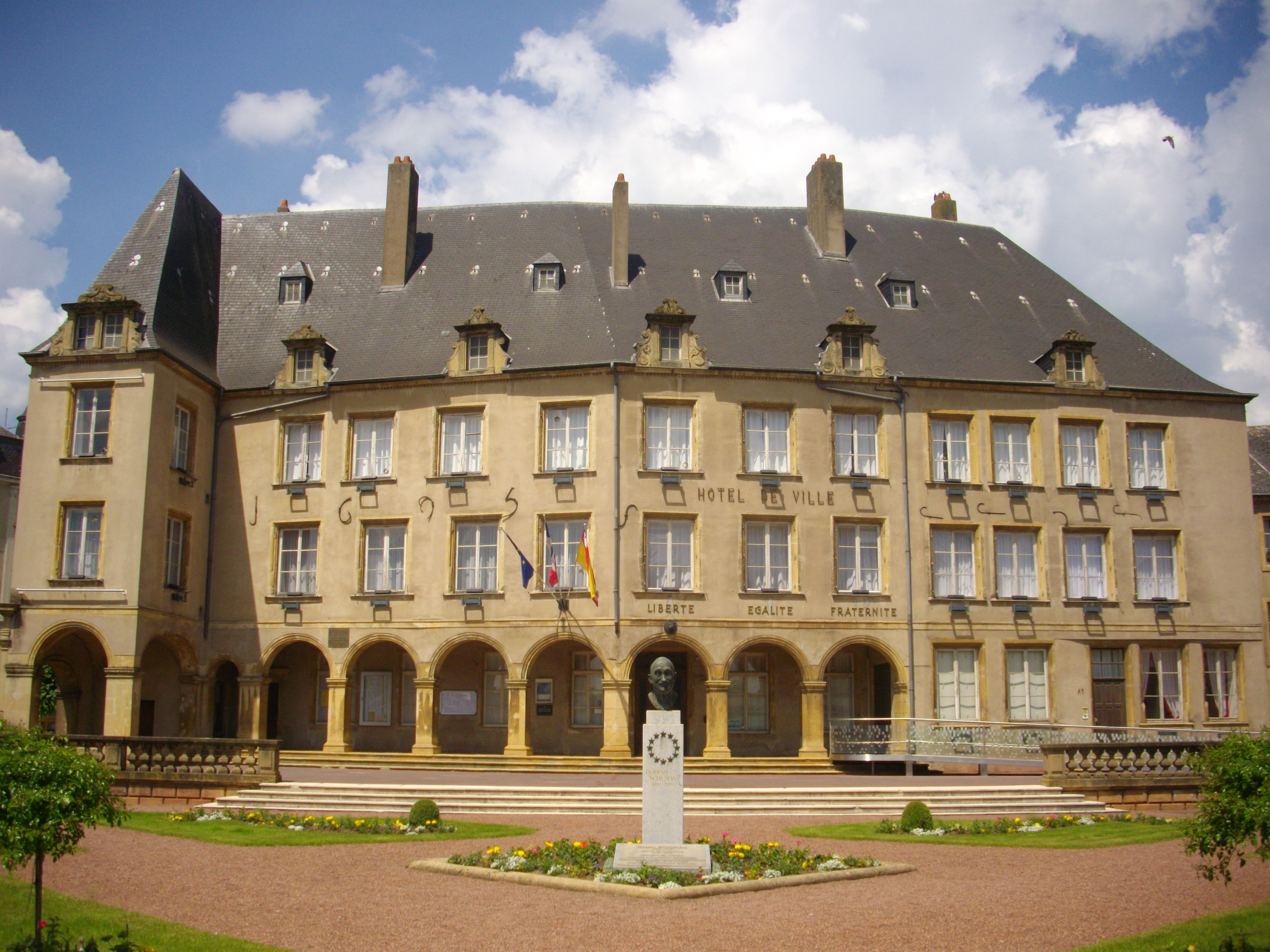
The Hôtel de Ville

In 1792, Thionville was besieged by the Duke of Brunswick, who unsuccessfully sought to defeat the French Revolution and restore Louis XVI to the royal throne. The writer François-René de Chateaubriand was left for dead during Condé's military émigré expedition against Thionville in 1792.

After the Franco-Prussian War of 1870, the area of Alsace-Lorraine was annexed by the newly created German Empire in 1871 by the Treaty of Frankfurt and became a Reichsland. Thionville once again became Diedenhofen and became a prosperous city. Some large neo-Romanesque buildings typical of the German Empire were constructed in the city. The German Army decided to build a fortress line from Mülhausen to Luxembourg to protect the new Reichsland. The centerpiece of this line was the great Moselstellung, a fortress system protecting Metz and Diedenhofen.

The fortifications around Diedenhofen centred on three main forts: the Fort de Guentrange on the northwest side, Fort de Koenigsmacker to the northeast, and the Fort d'Illange to the south. Each position was surrounded by several ditches, with shelters and observation cupolas. A large barbed wire belt defended by machine guns completed the defensive system.

Following the armistice with Germany ending the First World War, the French army entered Diedenhofen in November 1918 and the city was transferred to France by the Treaty of Versailles in 1919, after it again became Thionville.

During the Second World War, Lorraine was placed under a German civilian administration and was thus once again de facto part of the German Reich (though unrecognized by the Western Allies), and the city became Diedenhofen once more. In 1944, US troops entered Diedenhofen, which has belonged to France as Thionville since then. In the winter of 1944-45, the Displaced Persons Camp No. 8 was established here. In the following years it was home to the thousands of former concentration camp prisoners and POWs.

After experiencing, along with all of France, an economic upswing during the postwar decades (trente glorieuses), the heavy industry of Thionville suffered setbacks beginning in the 1970s. The city and the entire region have faced hardships and structural unemployment since then.

Jean-Marie Demange, who had served as the town's mayor for thirteen years, committed suicide in 2008 after killing his mistress with two gunshots in the head.

== Economy ==
The area around Thionville has relied on heavy industry, most notably since the end of the 19th century, due to the presence of iron ore in the area. The first large steel mill in Thionville was opened in 1898. Since the steel crisis of the 1970s, several steel mills have been closed, and only a few have remained active. A growing number of residents of Thionville commute to nearby Luxembourg (Thionville is 15 km, 9 3/8 miles from the border).

=== Transport ===
The Gare de Thionville railway station offers connections with Luxembourg, Metz, Nancy, Paris, Strasbourg, Brussels, Zürich, and several regional destinations. The A31 motorway connects Thionville with Luxembourg and Metz.

== Twin towns ==
- Gao, Mali
- Varallo Pombia, Italy
- Urbana, Illinois, United States

== Administration ==
Incorporations:

- Veymerange, in 1967
- Volkrange, in 1970
- Garche (exclave of the commune), Kœking and Œutrange in 1970
- Guentrange
- Elange
- Metzange
- Beuvange-sous-Saint-Michel

Since the French canton reorganisation which came into effect in March 2015, Thionville is divided over the cantons of Thionville and Yutz.

=== Neighboring communes ===
- Algrange
- Basse-Ham (by Garche)
- Entrange
- Escherange
- Cattenom (by Garche)
- Hayange
- Hettange-Grande
- Florange
- Illange
- Manom
- Nilvange
- Terville
- Yutz

== Demographics ==
The population of Thionville increased mainly in the first half of the 20th century due to industrial development of the Upper Moselle basin. The economic slowdown and steel crisis of the 1970s affected the town and surrounding area, causing a population stagnation. The population data in the table and graph below refer to the commune of Thionville proper, in its geography at the given years. The commune of Thionville absorbed the former commune of Veymerange in 1966, Volkrange in 1969, and Garche, Kœking, and Œutrange in 1970.

Historical population

Year	Pop.	±% p.a.
1793	5,010	—
1800	5,011	+0.00%
1806	4,907	−0.35%
1821	5,739	+1.05%
1836	5,680	−0.07%
1841	5,712	+0.11%
1861	7,818	+1.58%
1866	7,376	−1.16%
1871	7,207	−0.46%
1875	7,168	−0.14%
1880	7,155	−0.04%
1885	8,111	+2.54%
1890	8,923	+1.93%
1895	9,167	+0.54%
1900	10,062	+1.88%
1905	11,948	+3.50%
1910	11,656	−0.49%

Year	Pop.	±% p.a.
1921	13,464	+1.32%
1926	13,040	−0.64%
1931	17,395	+5.93%
1936	18,934	+1.71%
1946	17,596	−0.73%
1954	23,054	+3.43%
1962	31,811	+4.11%
1968	37,079	+2.59%
1975	43,020	+2.15%
1982	40,573	−0.83%
1990	39,712	−0.27%
1999	40,907	+0.33%
2007	40,910	+0.00%
2012	41,325	+0.20%
2017	40,701	−0.30%
2023	42,658	+0.79%

Source: EHESS and INSEE (1968-2023)

== Sport ==
US Thionville Lusitanos is the local football club.

== Notable people ==
- Johann von Aldringen, soldier (1588–1634)
- Joseph Bodin de Boismortier, composer (1689–1755)
- Antoine Merlin de Thionville, politician (Merlin of Thionville, 1762–1833)
- Nicolas Dahlmann, military leader (1769–1807)
- Senta Söneland, actress (1882–1934)
- Gerhard Borrmann, physicist (1908–2006)
- Ernest Bour, conductor (1913–2001)
- Henry Anglade, cyclist (born 1933)
- Rachid Arhab, journalist (born 1955)
- Thierry Queffelec, civil servant and Prefect of French Guiana (born 1962)
- Francis Renaud, actor (born 1967)
- Carole Gaessler, journalist (born 1968)
- La Grande Sophie, singer (born 1969)
- Eddy Riva, race walker (born 1973)
- Frédéric Weis, basketball player, famous for "le dunk de la mort" (born 1977)
- Nasreddine Kraouche, footballer (born 1979)
- Julien Quercia, footballer (born 1986)
- Benjamin Corgnet, footballer (born 1987)
- Enzo Richer, racing driver (born 2006)
