= International Piano Competition for Outstanding Amateurs =

Piano competition

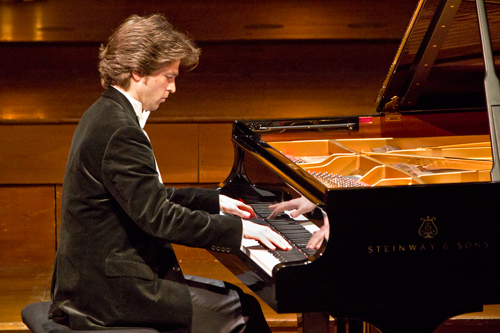
Dominic Piers Smith (race car designer, UK) at the finals of the 23rd International Piano Competition for Outstanding Amateurs (2012)

The International Piano Competition for Outstanding Amateurs (French: Concours des Grands Amateurs de Piano) is a piano competition for amateur pianists, held in Paris, France. It has been held annually since 1989. The competition is widely considered to be one of the top-level competitions for amateur musicians in the world.

== Concept ==
Created in 1989 by Gérard Bekerman, professor of economics at the university and a graduate of the Paris School of Music, the International Piano Competition for Outstanding Amateurs is designed for top-level amateurs. They come from all walks of life – doctors, office workers, lawyers, students, pensioners, engineers, and many others. The contestant's minimum age is 18; there is no upper age limit.

The competition has met with considerable success over the years, attracting hundreds of candidates from more than 50 countries worldwide. One of the basic principles of the competition is the free choice of programme. There are no set pieces. The aim is not to limit the candidates, but to discover the works of musicians of their own choosing. Gérard Bekerman, the founder of the competition, claims that in Paris, the desire to "win" is outweighed by the love of music: "Pianists discover that the Competition for Outstanding Amateurs is not a competition but an 'anti-competition'. There are no opponents, no competitors, no judges, just music lovers".

The competition is held in three rounds:

- Preliminaries: candidate's choice (10 minutes)
- Semi-finals: a work by Bach and a romantic composition (15 minutes)
- Finals: free program (30 minutes)

Ten to twelve semi-finalists and five or six finalists are selected each year.

== Level ==
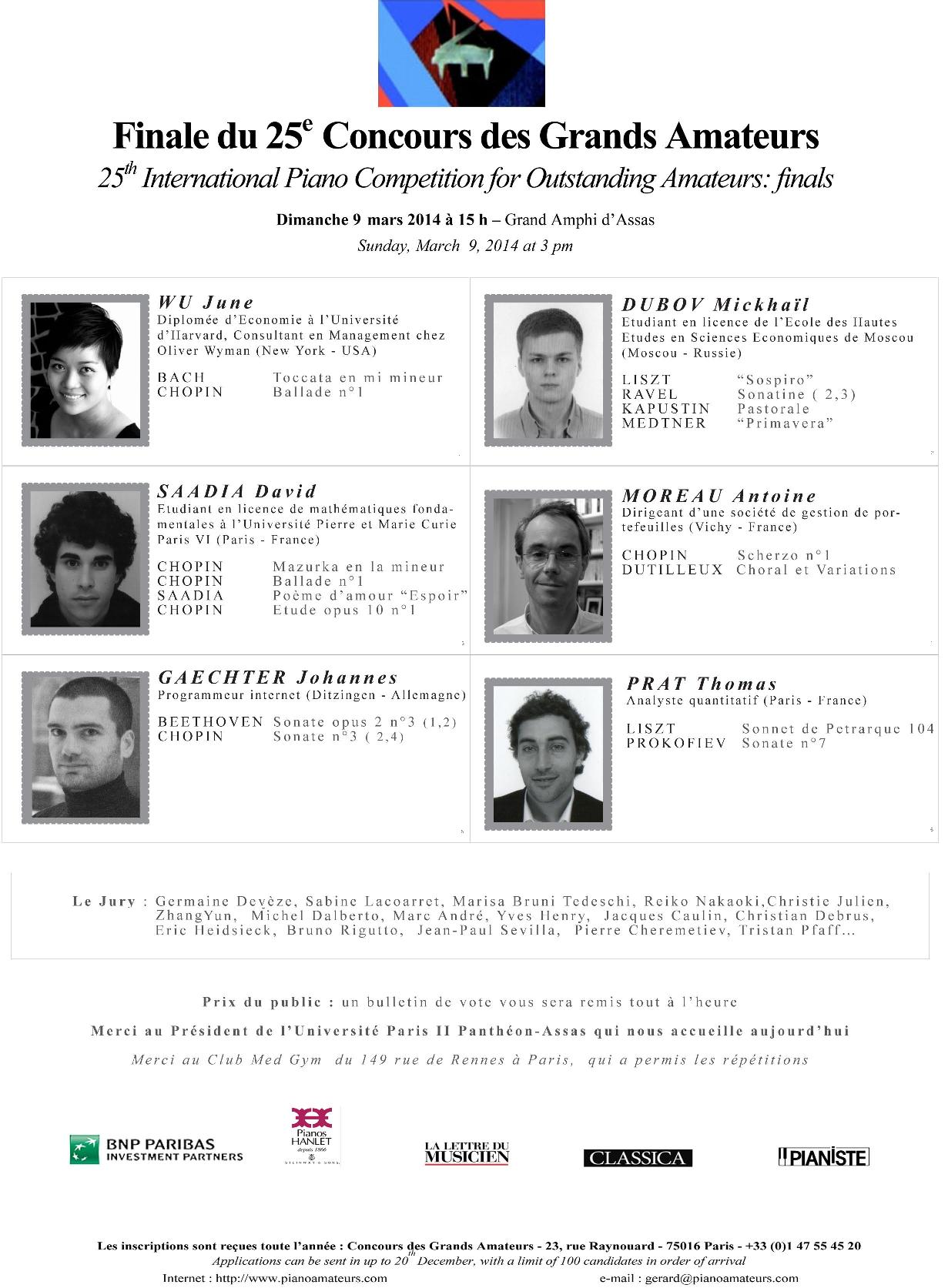
Poster of the final round of the 25th Competition (2014) with the programmes of the finalists

The originality of the competition lies in the fact that the competitors are not amateurs in the sense of "dabblers", but pianists, "who don’t just play the piano", musicians who, at some time in their lives, have had to make a choice, often a difficult one, between their profession and their potential career as a concert performer, the choice between making a living and their love of music.

As a result, the quality of the performance is very high. Many of the amateurs are real virtuosi; pianists often choose technically tough pieces by Liszt, Chopin or Rachmaninoff for their repertoire.

The winners have been invited to play with orchestral backing in the Sorbonne in Paris, under the baton of Georges Prêtre and the American conductor George Pehlivanian and, more recently, with the Symphony Orchestra of the Republican Guard of Paris directed by François Boulanger and the orchestra of the Paris Conservatorium of Music conducted by Pierre-Michel Durand. Many award winners have been invited to play at the Les Amateurs Virtuoses! festival, one of the most significant festivals for amateur pianists held all over the world.

== Jury ==
Each year, the panel of judges consists of well-known pianists and key personalities: İdil Biret, Geneviève Joy-Dutilleux, Anne Queffelec, Sabine Lacoarret, Germaine Devèze, François-René Dûchable, Marc Laforet, Aldo Ciccolini, Michel Dalberto, Jay Gottlieb, Alexis Weissenberg, Marc-Olivier Dupin, Éric Heidsieck, Jean-Claude Pennetier, Dominique Merlet, Siheng Song, Michel Beroff, Nella Rubinstein and so on.

A second "press panel" consists of more than twenty music critics representing both the main European dailies and the national and international media.

Finally, there is an "audience award" which is given to the amateur pianist who has the most votes from the audience, collected at the final round of the competition.

== Prize winners ==
Top prize winners (since 2006)
| No. | Year | 1st | 2nd | 3rd | Press award | Audience award |
|---|---|---|---|---|---|---|
| 16th | 2005 | (France) Thierry Goldwaser (software engineer) (China) Ye Feng (international trade graduate) | Not Awarded | (Japan) Hiroaki Taniguchi (public relations officer) | (China) Ye Feng (international trade graduate) | (France) Thierry Goldwaser (software engineer) (China) Ye Feng (international trade graduate) (tie) |
| 17th | 2006 | (Canada) Thomas Yu (periodontist) | (United Kingdom) Rupert Egerton-Smith (lawyer) (Germany) Dominik Winterling (concert director) (tie) | Not Awarded | (Canada) Thomas Yu (periodontist) | (Canada) Thomas Yu (periodontist) |
| 18th | 2007 | (Japan) Masanori Murakami (biochemical engineer) | (United States) Christopher Shih (gasteroenterologist) | (United Kingdom) Jamie Ng (financial analyst) (France) Sandra Petit (lawyer) | (Japan) Masanori Murakami (biochemical engineer) | (United Kingdom) Jamie Ng (financial analyst) |
| 19th | 2008 | (United States) Christopher Shih (gasteroenterologist) | (Japan) Kuntaro Deguchi (United States) Carl Dicasoli (biostatistician) | Not Awarded | (United States) Christopher Shih (gasteroenterologist) | |
| 20th | 2009 | (United Kingdom) Rupert Egerton-Smith (lawyer) | (Ukraine) Dmytro Vynohradov (airline manager) | (France) Romaine Coharde (meteorological engineer) (Brazil) Robert Fuchs (architect) (tie) | (France) Romaine Coharde (meteorological engineer) | (United Kingdom) Rupert Egerton-Smith (lawyer) |
| 21st | 2010 | (France) Loïc Lafontaine (assistant manager) | (Canada) Michael Cheung (management consultant) | (Canada) Daniel Chow (chartered accountant) | (France) Loïc Lafontaine (assistant manager) | (France) Loïc Lafontaine (assistant manager) |
| 22nd | 2011 | (United Kingdom) Simon Grisdale (interpreter) (France) Robin Stephenson (mathematician) (tie) | (France) Claire Rocher (mathematician) | (United States) Gorden Cheng (financial analyst) | (United Kingdom) Simon Grisdale (interpreter) (France) Robin Stephenson (mathematician) (tie) | (France) Robin Stephenson (mathematician) |
| 23rd | 2012 | (United Kingdom) Dominic Piers Smith (race car designer) | (Japan) Kensuke Ota (physicist) | (Hong Kong) Ricker Choi (financial analyst) | | (United Kingdom) Dominic Piers Smith (race car designer) |
| 24th | 2013 | (France) Sylvain Carpentier (mathematician) | (Italy) Paolo Gilardi (phycologist) | (Switzerland) Jeremy Mätzener (law student) | (France) Sylvain Carpentier (mathematician) | (France) Sylvain Carpentier (mathematician) |
| 25th | 2014 | (France) Antoine Moreau (manager) | (France) Thomas Prat (quantitative analyst) | (Russia) Mikhail Dubov (computer scientist) (United States) June Wu (consultant) (tie) | (Russia) Mikhail Dubov (computer scientist) | (France) Thomas Prat (quantitative analyst) |
| 26th | 2015 | (France) Samuel Bach (mathematician) (United States) Michaël Slavin (ophthalmologist) (tie) | Not Awarded | (Israel) Eric Rouach (estate agent) | (Israel) Eric Rouach (estate agent) | (Israel) Eric Rouach (estate agent) (France) Samuel Bach (mathematician) (tie) |
| 27th | 2016 | (France) Olivier Korber (trader) | (France) Olivier Dupont (financial engineer) (France) Julien Cohen (mathematician) (tie) | Not Awarded | (France) Olivier Korber (trader) | (France) Olivier Korber (trader) |
| 28th | 2017 | (United Kingdom) William Galton (mathematician) | (Israel) Eric Rouach (estate agent) | (France) Jean-Roch Le Henaff (medical student) | (United Kingdom) William Galton (mathematician) | (United States) Zach Weiner (software engineer) |
| 29th | 2019 | Sebastián Amenábar (vice president) | (United States) Roger Luo (lawyer) | (Germany) Johannes Gaechter (programmer) | (United States) Roger Luo (lawyer) | Sebastián Amenábar (vice president) (United States) Roger Luo (lawyer) |
| 30th | 2022 | (Austria) Oliver Malle (medical doctor) (France) Pierre Watrin (polytechnician) (Israel) Eric Rouach (estate agent) (tie) | Not Awarded | Not Awarded | (Austria) Oliver Malle (medical doctor) (France) Pierre Watrin (polytechnician) (tie) | (United States) Amanda Kim (psychiatrist) |
| 31st | 2023 | (United States) Zach Weiner (software engineer) | (Italy) Cesare Grassi (taxi driver) | (Japan) Sho Yamazaki (political analyst) | (United States) Zach Weiner (software engineer) | (Italy) Cesare Grassi (taxi driver) |
| 32nd | 2024 | (Japan) Yasuko Komiyama (IT Sales Manager) (United States) Alexander Stabile (software engineer) | (Israel) Din Zohar (doctor) (United States) Andrew Throdahl (marketing professional) | (South Korea) Hyunseo Uhm (Engineering Student) | (United States) Alexander Stabile (software engineer) | (Japan) Yasuko Komiyama (IT Sales Manager) |

== See also ==
- International Chopin Piano Competition for Amateurs
- Piano Bridges International Competition for Amateur Pianists
