= Pierre Thibaud =

Pierre Thibaud (22 June 1929 – 29 October 2004) was a French classical trumpeter.

== Life ==
Born in Proissans, Dordogne, Thibaud studied violon and trumpet at the Conservatoire de Bordeaux, then at the Conservatoire de Paris in Eugène Foveau's class where he won a First Prize for cornet.

In the 1960s and 1970s, he participated in all of conductor Karl Richter's recordings.

From 1975 to 1994, he was professor of trumpet and cornet at the Conservatoire de Paris. Trumpeter of international notoriety, his teaching was very much in demand. His many students included Philippe Litzler, trumpet soloist of the Tonhalle Orchester Zürich and professor at the Lucerne University of Applied Sciences and Arts, Clément Saunier, Clément Garrec (academic of the Conservatoire de Paris), Bruno Tomba, Bruno Nouvion, Pierre Gillet, Håkan Hardenberger, Otto Sauter, Piet Knarren, Reinhold Friedrich, Mickael Bridenfeld, Marco Braito, Marc André, Ricardo Chiavetta, Giorgio Baggiani, Matthias Persson.

In addition to his activity as an orchestral musician, not only with the Münchener Bach-Chor, and first trumpeter of the Israel Philharmonic Orchestra and at the Paris Opéra, but also among others at the Lamoureux and Colonne concerts as well as the French Republican Guard Band, until around 1999, he led a career as an international soloist. He has teamed up with the organist Philippe Dubeau, who was in charge of the Notre-Dame de Clignancourt church in Paris.

Thibaud had an extensive repertoire and was associated in particular with Pierre Boulez's Domaine musical and the struggles to impose the music of his contemporaries. Pierre Boulez also had to call on him when he set up the Ensemble intercontemporain in 1976.

Thibaud gave annual master classes from 1991 to 2000 in the International Trumpet Academy of Bremen, Germany, and was a member of the faculty of the International Trumpet Academy with international colleagues such as Timofei Dokschitzer (Russia), Bo Nilsson (Sweden), Otto Sauter (Germany). After his retirement from the Paris Conservatory, Pierre Thibaud was appointed professor at the Tokyo College of Music.

Thibaud died in Paris on 29 October 2004.

== Recordings ==
Among his many recordings as a soloist is the popular Arsenic Blues, by Marc Lanjean, the main theme of the television series Les Cinq Dernières Minutes. He can also be heard on all the recordings of conductor Karl Richter. He can be seen on many video clips with great chef Richter on YouTube.
