= Demailly =

Demailly is a French surname. Notable people with the surname include:

- Alexis Demailly (born 1980), French trumpeter and cornetist
- Jean-Pierre Demailly (1957–2022), French mathematician

== See also ==
- De Mailly
