= Miroslava Pešíková =

Czech ballet dancer (1946–2026)

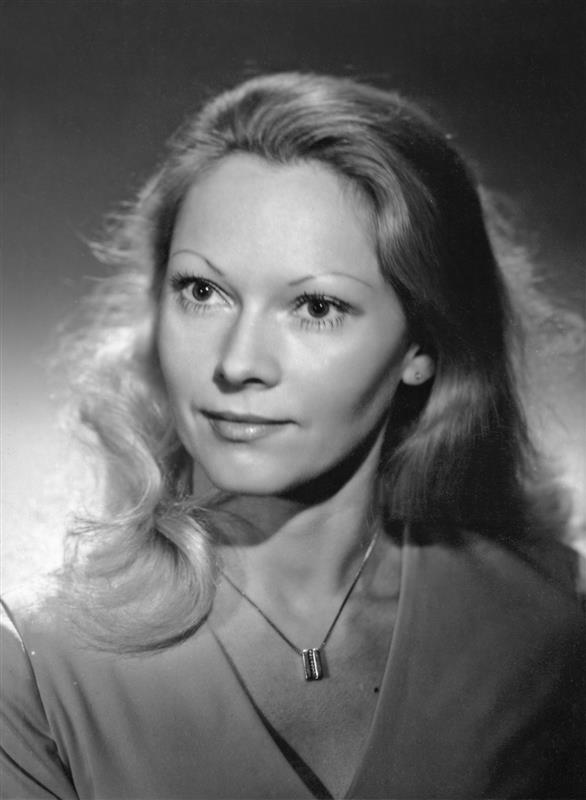
- Pešíková in an undated photo
- Born: 11 August 1946; Prague, Czechoslovakia
- Died: 11 January 2026 (aged 79)
- Occupations: Ballet dancer; Ballet mistress; Ballet teacher
- Organizations: National Theatre Prague
- Awards: Merited Artist of Czechoslovakia

Miroslava Pešíková (11 August 1946 – 11 January 2026) was a Czech ballet dancer and solo dancer. She was best known for her work at the National Theatre in Prague for almost three decades. She portrayed lead roles, both traditional such as Masha in The Nutcracker and Odette/Odile in Swan Lake, and dramatic negative characters such as Lady Copper Mountain in The Stone Flower and Lady Macbeth in Macbeth. After her dancing career she was a ballet mistress and dance teacher.

== Life and career ==
Pešíková was born in Prague on 11 August 1946. She started dancing ballet at the M. Aubrechtovás private dance school. She was accepted to the Prague Conservatory's dance department, studying with R. Mazalová, among others. She graduated in 1966 and was hired by the National Theatre in Prague the same year. She was promoted to soloist in 1971. She was employed at the National Theatre until 1997. In 1973, and again in 1976, she was an intern at the Bolshoi Theatre in Moscow. In 1973 she studied for two months with M. T. Semjonovová, and also at the Moscow Academic Music Theatre. In 1976 she stayed for one month. She achieved a master's degree in dance pedagogy at the Academy of Performing Arts in Prague in 1991. Her dancing at the National Theatre was influenced by choreographers including Jiří Kylián, Pierre Lacotte, and Sulamith Messerer.

She performed 47 roles at the National Theatre, able to portray negative characters. Leading roles included Swanilda in Coppélia, Masha in The Nutcracker, Odette/Odile in Swan Lake, the title role in Giselle and Kitri in Don Quixote. She interpreted negative characters including Runa in Radúz and Mahulena, Zarema in The Fountain of Bakhchisarai, Lady Copper Mountain in The Stone Flower, and Lady Macbeth in Macbeth. She also portrayed Juliet in Romeo and Juliet, Eve in La Création du monde, and Aegina in Spartacus, Lisetta in L. Hertel's Marná opatrnost (Vain Precaution) choreographed by Alicia Alonso and the Tsarevna in The Firebird.

Between 1998 and 2001, she served as ballet mistress at the Josef Kajetán Tyl Theatre in Plzeň, as well as teaching at a private dance conservatory in Prague.

Her ex-husband, Slovak composer Juraj Filas, died from COVID-19 complications in 2021; the couple had a daughter. In 2023, Pešíková was awarded the Thalia Lifetime Award for her achievements.

Pešíková died on 11 January 2026, at the age of 79.
