= Canton of Thionville =

Coordinates: 49.36°N 6.16°E

The canton of Thionville is an administrative division of the Moselle department, northeastern France. It was created at the French canton reorganisation which came into effect in March 2015. Its seat is in Thionville.

It consists of the following communes:

1. Terville
2. Thionville (partly)
