= Jean-Georges Paulus =

French musician and conductor (1816-1898)

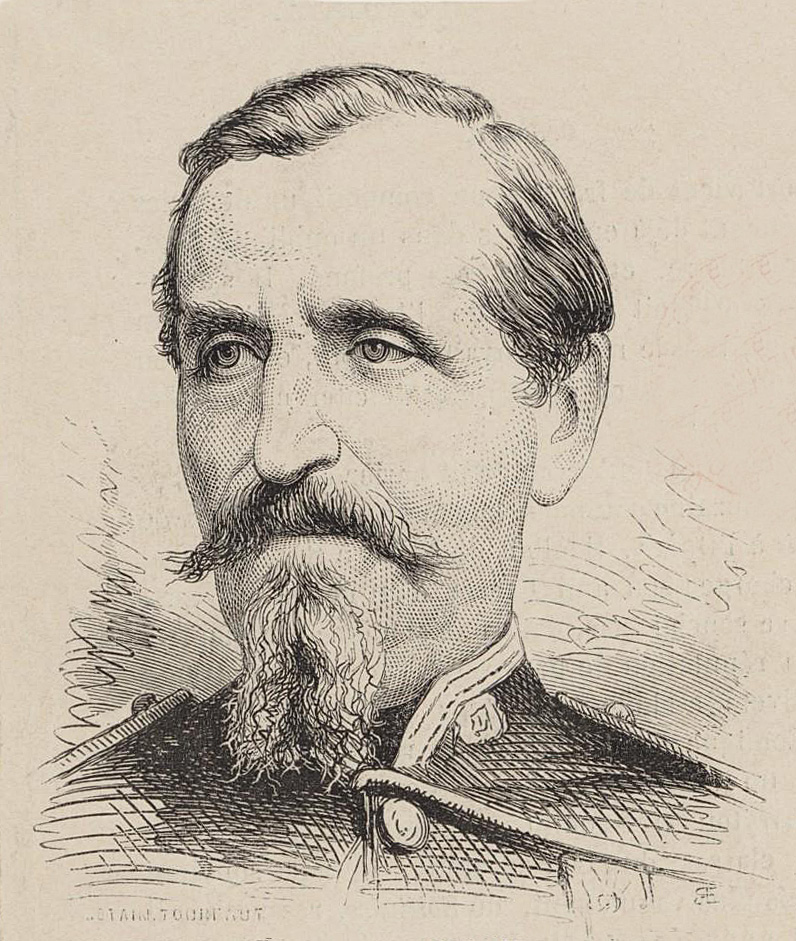
"M. Paulus, music director of the Republican Guard, currently giving concerts in America" (1872)

Jean-Georges Paulus (5 August 1816 – 14 April 1898), was a French musician, conductor of music from 1848 to 1873 and founder of the French Republican Guard Band.

== Biography ==
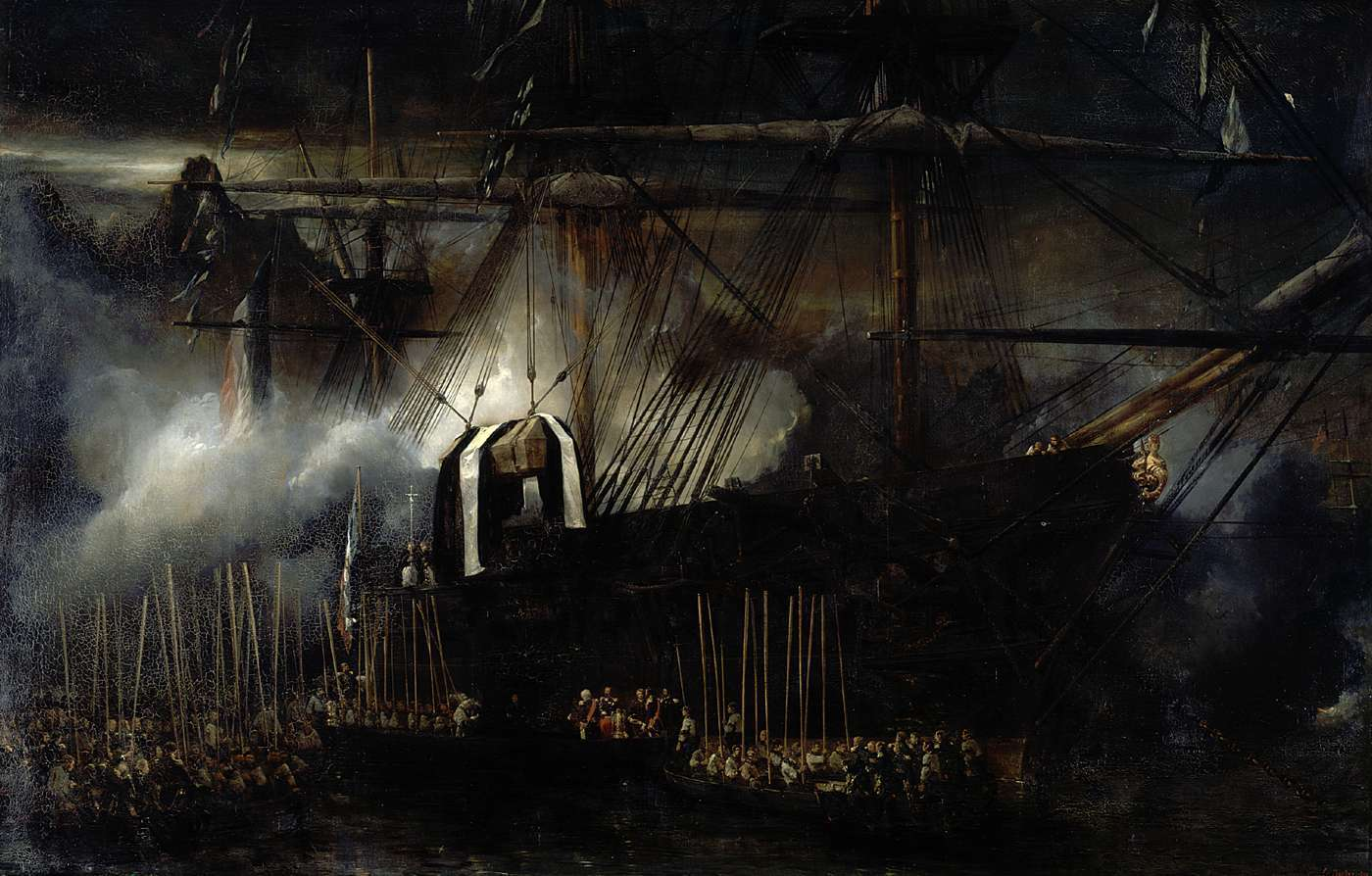
The transfer of Napoleon's remains aboard Belle Poule, 15 October 1840, painting by Eugène Isabey (1843).

Born in Haguenau (Bas-Rhin), he was the son of a coffee maker, Jean-Georges Paulus and Madeleine Schmitt.

In 1835, Paulus won a first prize for clarinet at the Conservatoire de Paris. He later became music chief on the ships Hercule and Belle Poule, where he participated in the ceremonies of the retour des cendres of Napoléon. He was officially appointed Music Director of François d'Orléans, Prince of Joinville.

From 1848 to 1864, he founded and conducted the Fanfare band of the Republican Guard of Paris, which then developed to form the French Republican Guard Band.

Paulus died at his home in the 7th arrondissement of Paris 14 April 1898.

== Awards ==
- Chevalier of the Légion d'honneur (12 August 1864 decree)
- Chevalier of the Ordre des Palmes Académiques

== Sources ==
- Jean-Loup Mayol, "Jean-Georges Paulus", in 150 ans de musique à la Garde Républicaine : mémoires d'un orchestre, Connétable, Paris, 1998, p. 22-23 ISBN 2-84368-097-2
- Claude Muller, "Jean Georges Paulus", in Nouveau dictionnaire de biographie alsacienne, vol. 29, p. 2954
- Prosper Suiter, "Jean Georges Paulus, chef de la musique de la Garde Républicaine", in Elsaß-Lothringische Gesang und Musikzeitung, 1911, issue n° 10, p. 179-180
