= Marc Geujon =

French classical trumpeter

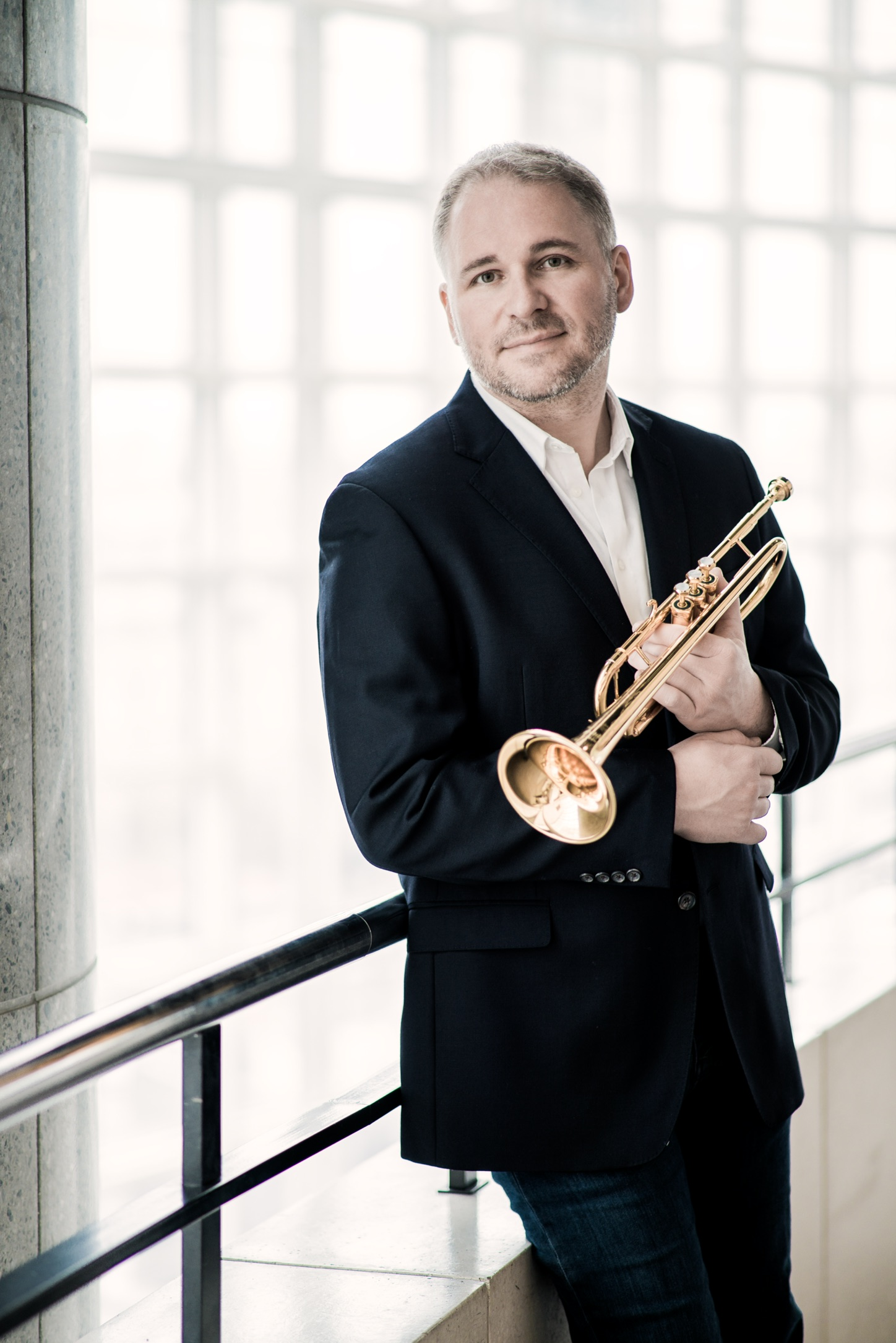

Background information
- Born: 8 October 1974 (age 51)
- Genres: Classical trumpeter

Marc Geujon (born 8 October 1974) is a French classical trumpeter.

== Life ==
Born in Gonnehem (Pas-de-Calais), Marc Geujon studied trumpet at the music school of Gonnehem with Gilbert Breuvart, at the École Nationale de Musique of Arras in Philippe Vaucoret's class, then at the conservatory of Rueil-Malmaison with Éric Aubier. First Prize unanimously of the Conservatoire de Paris in Clément Garrec's class, he is successively solo trumpet of the French Republican Guard Band, the Opéra national du Rhin based in Mulhouse, the Orchestre de Picardie, the Paris chamber orchestra and principal trumpet "Super-soliste" of the Orchestre de l'Opéra national de Paris.

First Professor of trumpet at the conservatories of Rueil-Malmaison and Saint-Maur-des-Fossés, Geujon was appointed professor of trumpet at the Conservatoire National Superieur de Musique et de Danse de Paris (CNSMDP).

He is also a chamber musician with the Paris Opera Brass Quintet, David Defiez, Nicolas Vallade and Fabien Wallerand. He regularly performs as a soloist in Europe, Asia and the United States. He also collaborates with the Schilke instrument maker (Chicago-USA), in particular for the Soloiste Serie (Models SC4-MG and SB4-MG).

== Selected discography ==
- Concertos pour trompette et orchestre de J.Haydn et J.N.Hummel with Paul Kuentz' orchestra, Live Recording
- 4 concertos pour Cor de W.A.Mozart with Paul Kuentz's orchestra, Live Recording - Corno da Caccia
- Tableaux d’une exposition de Modest Mussorgsky with the Opera de Paris conducted by Philippe Jordan

== Sources ==
- (in English) Marc Geujon and the New Schilke ‘Soloiste’
