= Bernard Galais =

French classical harpist and composer

Bernard Galais (30 January 1921 – 14 August 2009) was a French classical harpist and composer.

His work, which is highly stylistically independent, reflects the multiple influences of his own career: soloist at the Paris Opera, and the French Republican Guard Band. He also left many transcriptions and recorded recitals in the 1970s.

== Life ==
=== Youth ===
Galais was born on 20 January 1921 in Le Havre. His mother introduced him to music, with solfège and piano.

In 1934, Galais joined Marcel Tournier's class, Grand prix de Rome (1909) and composer, who entrusted him to Pierre Jamet in 1936.

=== Career ===
During the Second World War, his career was divided between the Paris Opera (he later became first harp soloist) and the Orchestre de la Société des concerts du Conservatoire, where he remained for about twenty years.

In 1946, he became solo harpist in the French Republican Guard Band. He will also be a soloist at the Concerts Colonne (from 1967).

He occasionally replaced Pierre Jamet at the Conservatoire de Paris, touring extensively (France, England, Japan), performing under the baton of Conductor such as Karl Münchinger, Pierre Dervaux, René Leibowitz and Robert Blot.

He succeeded Pierre Jamet within the "Quintette instrumental de Paris".

His 80th birthday is celebrated at the International Association of Harpists and Friends of the Harp by the performance of several of his pieces during a concert exclusively dedicated to him, with students from all over France.

== Catalogue ==
=== For harp solo ===
- 20 petits préludes (Harposphère, 1990)
- 6 petites pièces (Billaudot, 1995)
- 8 morceaux en 2 recueils (Harposphère, 1988)
- 12 études mélodiques (Billaudot, 2000)
- Rêverie (Combre, 1996)
- Quatrain (Combre, 1996)
- Au bord du lac (Combre, 1996)
- Ponctuation (Harposphère, 1988)
- Mister Piroët (Harposphère, 1992)

=== For harp ensembles ===
- Paysages II (International Music Diffusion, 1994)
- Petite suite médiévale (Harposphère, 1995)
- Dialogue (International Music Diffusion, 1994)
- Défilé (Harposphère, 1995)

=== Harp with other instruments ===
- Barcarolle (Harposphère, 1995),
- Nocturne (International Music Diffusion, 1994)
- Sérénade, sicilienne, finale (Harposphère, 1996)
- Musique révolutionnaire pour harpe révolutionnaire (Harposphère, 1989)
- Final pour une fête (Harposphère, 1990)

== Transcriptions ==
Galais transcribed works such as Handel's concerto in B flat by reorchestrating it and giving it a cadence for Marielle Nordmann.

He also transcribed sonatas by François-Joseph Naderman the Divertimento No 2 by Paul Arma, the Nocturne in E major by Glinka and he composed cadenzas for the concertos in G minor and B flat major by Krumpholz.

== Discography ==
- 1970: Trois siècles de harpe - three vinyls in a box set, Vega
- 1970: Bernard Galais, série de transcriptions pour la harpe, Vega.
