= Hôtel de Ville, Thionville =

Town hall in Thionville, France

Hôtel de Ville
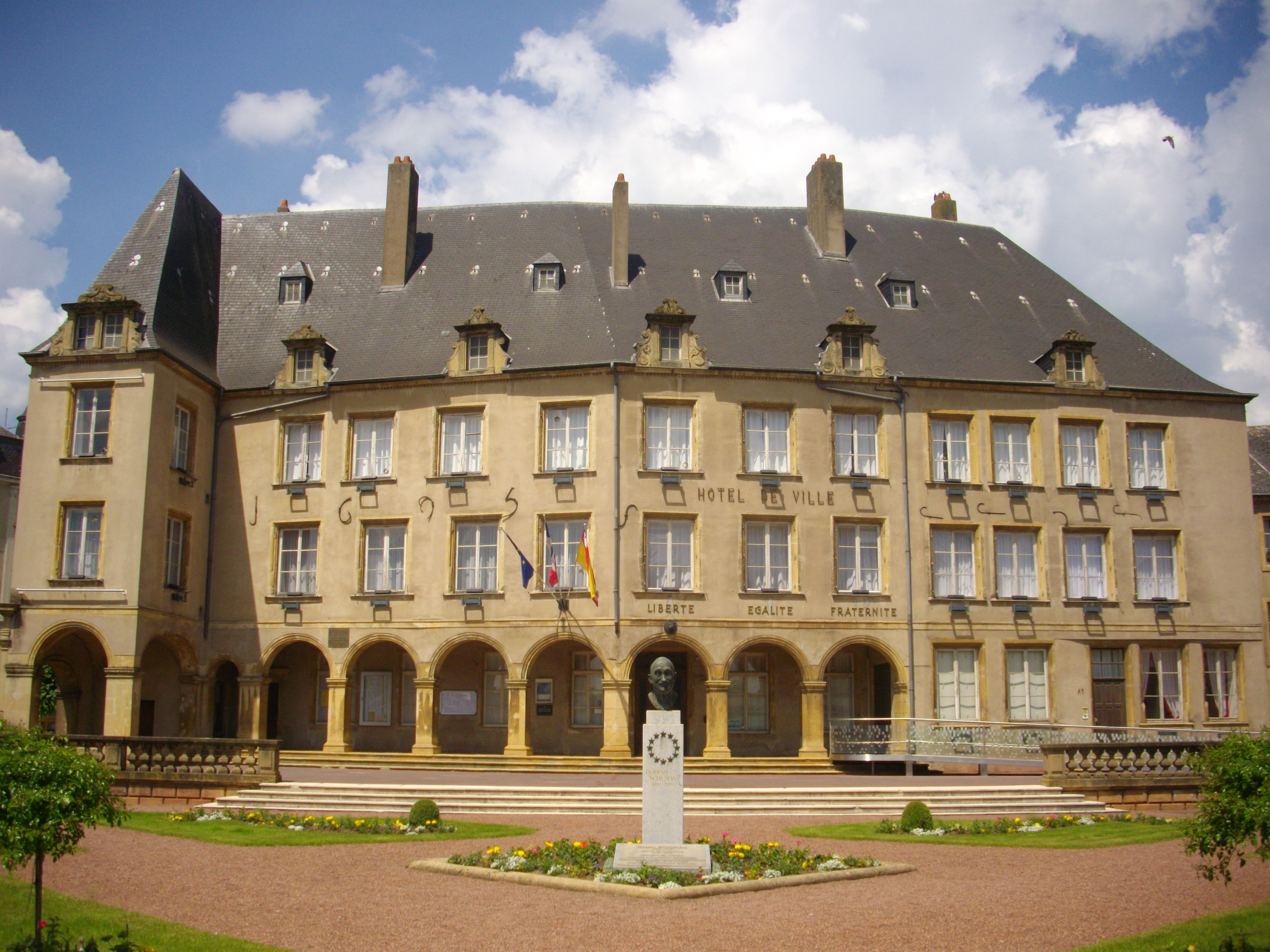
- The main frontage of the Hôtel de Ville in June 2013

General information
- Type: City hall
- Architectural style: Renaissance style
- Location: Thionville, France
- Coordinates: 49.3577°N 6.1682°E
- Completed: 1641

Monument historique
- Official name: Couvent des Clarisses (ancien)
- Type: Inscrit
- Designated: 1991
- Reference no.: PA00107059

The Hôtel de Ville (French pronunciation: [otɛl də vil], City Hall) is a municipal building in Thionville, Moselle, northeast France, standing on Place Robert Schuman. The building, which was originally conceived as a convert, was designated a monument historique by the French government in 1991.

== History ==
The building was commissioned as the Couvent des Clarisses (Convent of the Poor Clares). The nuns of the order established a presence in Thionville in 1629, at which time the town was part of the Spanish Netherlands. The order enjoyed the protection of the Governor, Isabella Clara Eugenia, who initially made a house in Rue de la Vieille-Porte available to them. However, the house, which dated from the 14th century, was in a poor state of repair and the nuns urgently needed a new property. The site they identified, close to the bridge across the river Moselle, was made available to them by the Cardinal-Infante Ferdinand of Austria, who succeeded Isabella Clara Eugenia as governor in 1633.

The new convent was designed in the Renaissance style, built in ashlar stone and was completed in 1641. It was badly damaged during the siege of Thionville by the Duke of Enghien in 1643, during the Thirty Years' War, and the subsequent restoration culminated in the completion of repairs to the chapel in 1665. The design involved an asymmetrical main frontage of seven bays facing onto Quai Pierre Marchal. There was a colonnade, formed by square columns with imposts and moulded arches, on the ground floor, and it was fenestrated by casement windows on the first and second floors and dormer windows at attic level. An extra wing featuring a three-stage tower, which was projected forward, was added on the left, facing onto Rue du Pont (now Rue Georges Ditsch), in 1695.

The convent was confiscated by the state and the nuns driven out during the French Revolution. It was initially converted for military use and the Jacobins took possession of the chapel but, in November 1804, it became a hospital. It was extended to create additional medical capacity in the mid-19th century.

Meanwhile, civic leaders were seeking new accommodation for municipal purposes. After meeting in the old beffroi (belfry) from the 14th century, the aldermen moved to an adjacent building on Rue de l'Ancien-Hôtel-de-Ville in 1708, before relocated to the old governor's palace in the early 19th century. The council selected the former convent as their new home and relocated there in 1898. Internally, the new rooms created included the Salle du Conseil (council chamber) and the Salle de Mariages (wedding room).

During the Second World War, the building was damaged by shelling by the US 90th Infantry Division, leading to civic leaders having to move to temporary accommodation, where they welcomed the Commanding General of US XX Corps, General Walton Walker, during the liberation of the town on 12 December 1944.

A bust created by François Cacheux, depicting the statesman, Robert Schuman, was unveiled in the gardens front of the town hall on 14 October 1973. It was stolen as part of a protest about foreign competition in the steel industry in 1983 but recovered from the River Moselle and restored to its original position in 1984. An urban structure, designed by Stéphane Costarella depicting a space rocket, was placed temporarily in the gardens, to the east of the Schuman bust, in 2020. A major programme of restoration works, which included repairs to the main façade, was initiated in February 2023.
