= Juraj Filas =

Slovak composer (1955–2021)

Juraj Filas (5 March 1955 – 31 December 2021) was a Slovak composer. His work included more than 100 compositions: symphonies, cantatas, numerous compositions for chamber ensemble, as well as the prize-winning TV opera Memento Mori; a concerto grosso Copernicus; the opera Jane Eyre (2010); The Wisdom of the Wise Man, a cantata for choir, cello and organ; The Song of Solomon, a cantata for soli, choir and orchestra; and the requiem Oratio Spei, which was dedicated to the victims of terrorism.

== Education ==
Filas graduated from the Prague Conservatory in 1976 in voice and composition, and received a diploma in composition in 1981 from professors Jan Zdeněk Bartoš and Jiří Pauer.

== Career ==
His compositions have been performed by well known soloists including Joseph Alessi, principal trombone in the New York Philharmonic, Otto Sauter, international piccolo trumpet soloist, and ensembles and orchestras in Europe and in the U.S. – including the Beethovenfest in Bonn, Germany, at the Prague Spring Festival, by the ORF, Vienna, in the Tonhalle of Zurich, as well as in London, Glasgow, St. Gallen, Geneva, Fulda, Paris, Hong Kong, Taipei, Tokyo, Mexico City, and at Carnegie Hall, New York, and by the choir and orchestra of sacred music at Sacred Space, New York. Several of his works were broadcast by Czech and Slovak radio and television, and are recorded on CD. Rob Cameron on Radio Praha called him "one of the Czech Republic's most important contemporary classical composers".

Filas used a distinctly lyrical and emotional musical language with which he strove to maintain the distinct European musical traditions of some of the masters such as Verdi, Beethoven and Mahler.

== Personal life and death ==
Filas lived in Prague and was an assistant professor at the Academy of Performing Arts in Prague where he taught composition. Filas was married to Czech ballet and solo dancer Miroslava Pešíková. The couple had a daughter. He died from COVID-19 on 31 December 2021 in Prague, at the age of 66 during the COVID-19 pandemic in the Czech Republic.

== Selected works ==
Orchestral

- Palpito, Symphonic Drama (1981)
- Chamber Symphony No. 1 (1982)
- La feste amorose, Symphony No. 1 (1984)
- La vampa dell'amore, Symphony No. 2 (1985)
- Chamber Symphony No. 2 (1985)
- Popolosa, Symphonic Overture (1988)
- Hommage à Dvořák, Novosvětská fantazie (New World Fantasy) (1991)
- Symphonie nach Mass (1994)
- L'ultimo cavaliere (Poslední kavalír; The Last Knight), Symphonic Overture (1995)
- Byla cesta (There Was a Way...) for chamber orchestra, organ and timpani (2004)
- Trebbia, Symphonic Overture (2006)
- Dokonané stvoření, Symphony No. 3 for narrator, synthesizer and orchestra (2007–2008)

Concertante

- Salamandra immortale, Double Concerto for violin, cello and string orchestra (1996)
- Ztracené iluze, Concert Romance for bass trombone and orchestra (1998)
- Don Quijotte, aneb Autoportrét (Don Quixote, or Self-portrait) for tenor trombone and orchestra (2000)
- Ora pro nobis, Concert Fantasy for English horn and orchestra (2000)
- Concerto for euphonium and orchestra (2002)
- Concerto for horn and wind orchestra (2004)
- Concerto for tuba and wind orchestra (2006)
- Copernicus, Concerto grosso for brass quintet and wind orchestra (2008)

Wind orchestra

- Slunce a déšť (Sun and Rain) (1990)
- La cadenza (1990)
- Ohnivý anděl (The Fiery Angel) (1992)
- Kulhavý osel (Der hinkende Esel), Celebration March (1993)
- Poslední slovanský tanec (The Last Slavonic Dance; Der Letzter slavische Tanz) (1995)
- Freundschafts Polka for small wind ensemble (1996)
- Con brio e con calore (1998)

Chamber music

- Sonata No. 1 for viola and piano (1978)
- Sonata for trumpet and piano (1979)
- Sonata for viola and organ (1979)
- Sonata No. 1 "Helios" for violin and piano (1983)
- Elegie "In Memoriam" for oboe and piano (1985)
- Flautina for flute and piano (1986)
- Sonata for harp (1986)
- Elegie for oboe, English horn, bassoon and piano (1987)
- Sonata "Les adieux" for clarinet and piano (1987)
- Sonata for cello and piano (1985)
- Sonata No. 2 "In memoriam" for viola and piano (1988)
- Sonata for tuba and piano (1991–1992)
- Trio for oboe, English horn and bassoon (1992)
- Contrasti, Sonata for bass clarinet and piano (1994)
- No Comment for brass quintet (1995)
- Malá slovenská rapsodia (Short Slovak Rhapsody) for clarinet and piano (1995)
- At the End of the Century, Sonata for trombone and piano (1996)
- Du liebe gute Freiheit, Quartet for oboe, tenor oboe, English horn and bassoon (1996); adaptation of the 1992 Trio for oboe, English horn and bassoon
- Rhapsody in Dark Blue, Smyčcový kvartet památce G. Gershwina (String Quartet in Memory of George Gershwin) (1997)
- Portrét času (Portrait of Time; Porträt der Zeit) for oboe, horn and piano (1998)
- Trio d'amour "Třpyt zaniklé říše" (Glimmer of a Fallen Empire) for violin, cello and piano (1999)
- Obětem Satana (To the Victims of Satan; Satans Opfern) for trombone quartet (1999)
- A Very Short Love Story, Romance for trumpet and piano (2002)
- Celli, dolci celli, Sonata for 10 cellos and 2 double basses (2003)
- Les adieux, Romance for violin and piano (2003)
- Omaggio a Verdi for wind quintet (2003)
- Piano Quintet for oboe, English horn, tenor oboe (or English horn), bassoon (or cello) and piano (2003)
- A Kiss from the Mother, Trio for violin, viola and cello (2004)
- De profundis, Sonata for trombone and organ (2006)
- Panta rei, Trio-Sonata for trumpet, trombone and piano (2007)
- Sonata No. 2 "Mondfinsternis" for violin and piano (2007)
- Úsměvy a slzy (Smiles and Tears), Trio-Sonata for 2 clarinets and piano (2007)
- Notturno for bassoon and piano (2008)
- Elephant Song for bass trombone and piano (2009)

Piccolo Trumpet

- Concerto for piccolo trumpet and orchestra (2002)(dedicated to Otto Sauter)
- Appassionata, Sonata for piccolo trumpet and organ (2004)(dedicated to Otto Sauter)
- Adagio for piccolo trumpet and piano or organ (2004)(dedicated to Otto Sauter)
- Romance for piccolo trumpet and organ (2005)(dedicated to Otto Sauter)

Keyboard

- Amorosa, Sonata for piano (1981)
- Fresca, Sonata for organ (1989)

Vocal

- Regina coeli, Song for children's voice, flute and organ (2004)

Choral

- La canzone dell'amore – vocal drama for soprano, baritone, chorus, organ and orchestra (1982); words by Petrarch and Francesco Maria Piave
- Poslední sen starého dubu (The Old Oak Tree's Last Dream), Cantata after the fairy tale by Hans Christian Andersen for children's chorus and orchestra (1983); words by the composer
- Jarný zpev (Spring Song), Cantata for mixed chorus and piano (1984); poem by Milan Rúfus
- Lauretti – Altre canzone amorose, Cantata for chamber chorus, 2 violins, cello and piano (1985); words by Petrarch
- Krvavé Te Deum "Obětem Gulagu" (The Bloody Te Deum) for soprano, chorus, synthesizer, tape and orchestra (1991)
- La canzone dell'ultimo addio, Chamber Cantata (1992); words by Petrarch
- La buona morte for chamber chorus a cappella (1995); words by Petrarch
- Requiem Oratio spei for soprano, tenor, baritone, chorus and orchestra (2002)
- Veni, Sancte Spitirus for chorus a cappella (2005)
- Hosanna for chorus and chamber chorus (2005)
