= Ruitz =

- Commune
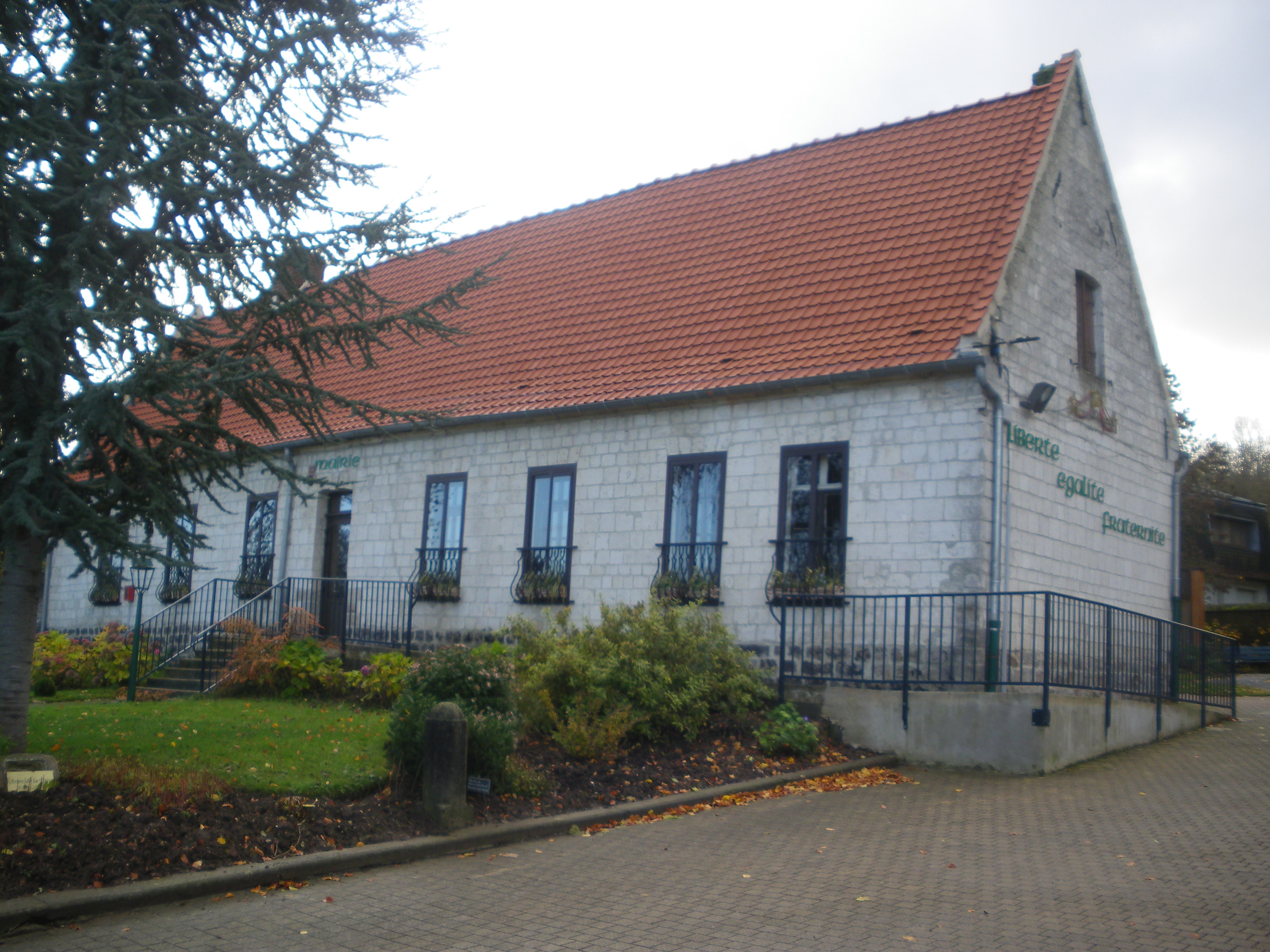
- The town hall of Ruitz
- Location of Ruitz
- Location within France Location within Hauts-de-France
- Coordinates: 50°28′06″N 2°35′25″E
- Country: France
- Region: Hauts-de-France
- Department: Pas-de-Calais
- Arrondissement: Béthune
- Canton: Nœux-les-Mines
- Intercommunality: CA Béthune-Bruay, Artois-Lys Romane

Government
  - Mayor (2020–2026): Jean-Pierre Sansen
- Area^{1}: 4.96 km^{2} (1.92 sq mi)
- Elevation: 62 m (203 ft)
- Highest elevation: 111 m (364 ft)
- Lowest elevation: 43 m (141 ft)
- Population (2023): 1,478
  - Density: 298/km^{2} (772/sq mi)
- Time zone: UTC+01:00 (CET)
  - Summer (DST): UTC+02:00 (CEST)
- INSEE/Postal code: 62727 /62620
- ^{1} French Land Register data, which excludes lakes, ponds, glaciers > 1 km^{2} (0.386 sq mi or 247 acres) and river estuaries.

Ruitz (French pronunciation: [ʁɥi]) is a commune in the Pas-de-Calais department in the Hauts-de-France region of France.

The trumpeter Alexis Demailly was born in Ruitz in 1980.

== Geography ==
Ruitz is situated about 5 miles (8.0 km) southwest of Béthune and 36 miles (58 km) southwest of Lille, at the junction of the D72 and D86e roads.

== Population ==
Historical population
Year	Pop.	±% p.a.
1968	1,016	—
1975	1,035	+0.27%
1982	1,426	+4.68%
1990	1,594	+1.40%
1999	1,582	−0.08%
2007	1,486	−0.78%
2012	1,518	+0.43%
2017	1,583	+0.84%
2023	1,478	−1.14%
Source: INSEE

== Places of interest ==
- The church of St. Maurice, dating from the thirteenth century.
- The eighteenth-century chateau.

== See also ==
- Communes of the Pas-de-Calais department
