= Piano Bridges International Competition for Amateur Pianists =

Piano competition held in Saint Petersburg, Russia

Logo of the Piano Bridges Competition

The Piano Bridges International Сompetition for Amateur Pianists is a piano competition for amateur pianists, held in Saint Petersburg, Russia. It has been held annually since 2011.

== Concept ==
The Piano Bridges Competition was founded in July 2011 by Natalia Dobrovolskaya. It keeps with the best traditions of amateur piano playing in Europe and around the world. Over the years of its existence, the competition has welcomed participants from more than 30 countries.

The competition aims to draw attention to amateur piano performances, maintain interest in performing among piano amateurs and promote their further creative development. It is one of the few competitions in the world that provides its contestants with a unique opportunity to perform not only a solo repertoire but also in a piano duo – four hands or two pianos. The other significant feature is the monthly concerts with the participation of the finalists and winners of the competition that are held throughout the year at different venues in St. Petersburg and other cities (Pavlovsk, Veliky Novgorod, Moscow and others). The educational part of the competition includes free masterclasses held by the jury members.

== Jury ==
Each year, the jury panel consists of well-known pianists: Grigory Korchmar, Oleg Vainstein, Pavel Eliashevich, Luc Ponet, Galina Minsker, Sergei Uryvaev and others.

== See also ==
- International Piano Competition for Outstanding Amateurs in Paris
