= Alexis Demailly =

Alexis Demailly (born 1980) is a French classical trumpeter and cornetist.

== Life ==
=== Family ===
Demailly was born in Ruitz (Pas-de-Calais) into a family of amateur musicians. He began playing the cornet and trumpet at the age of six in the ensemble Sainte-Cécile - Les amis réunis of Haillicourt.

=== Training ===
He graduated in trumpet at the Conservatoire de Lille and won first prize for cornet at the Saint-Omer conservatory. He continued his studies at the Conservatoire de Paris where he won the first prize for trumpet.

=== Career ===
First solo trumpet in the orchestra of the Pasdeloup Orchestra, he is principal cornet of the Air Force brass band. In 2003, he was appointed principal cornet of the Orchestre de l'Opéra national de Paris.

A trumpeter, he is passionate about the cornet whose repertoire he defends both in chamber music and in large orchestra.

In 2009, he joined the "Paris Brass Band" as main cornet, with whom he premiered in 2011 the concertino for cornet and brass band of the Maltese composer Joseph Vella.

With the trumpeter Marc Geujon and three other instrumentalists from the Paris Opera (David Defiez (French horn), Nicolas Vallade (trombone) and Fabien Wallerand (tuba), he created the brass quintet of the soloists of the Paris Opera.

== Discography ==
- Rhapsodie (2006), with the brass orchestra of Paris.
- Courts Métrages (2007) with the Vertige Quartet including Marc Geujon.
- Rainbow (2012).
- Divertimento (2013), within the Prestige Brass Quartet including Bastien Baumet. (euphonium)
- Portraits with Bastien Baumet (euphonium) (2014).
- Fantasque with the Urban String Quartet (2017). Créations de Stan Nieuwenhuis, Fabien Cali, Peter Meechan...

L'organiste de la cathédrale de Tulle, Michael Matthes prévoit d'enregistrer un disque avec Alexis Demailly.
