= Philippe Dubeau =

French classical organist and politician

Philippe Dubeau (born 14 July 1948) is a French classical organist and politician. He was mayor of the commune of Pageas in the Haute-Vienne department from 2001 until 2020.

As of late, he was titular of the grand organs of the Notre-Dame de Clignancourt church in Paris.

== Selected discography ==
- Trompette et Orgue - Telemann / Loeillet / Corelli / Albinoni - Pierre Thibaud, trumpet; organ of Notre-Dame-de-Clignancourt (June 1997, ILD) OCLC 658790525
- Les plus beaux adagios (Bach, Haendel, Stradella, Corelli) - Renaud Fontanarosa, cello; organ of Notre-Dame-de-Clignancourt (1994, ILD) OCLC 743138734
- Bach, les grandes œuvres pour orgue - organ of Saint-Augustin à Paris (1990, ILD) OCLC 658693172, BnF 38245648h
