= Amaury du Closel =

French conductor and composer (1956–2024)

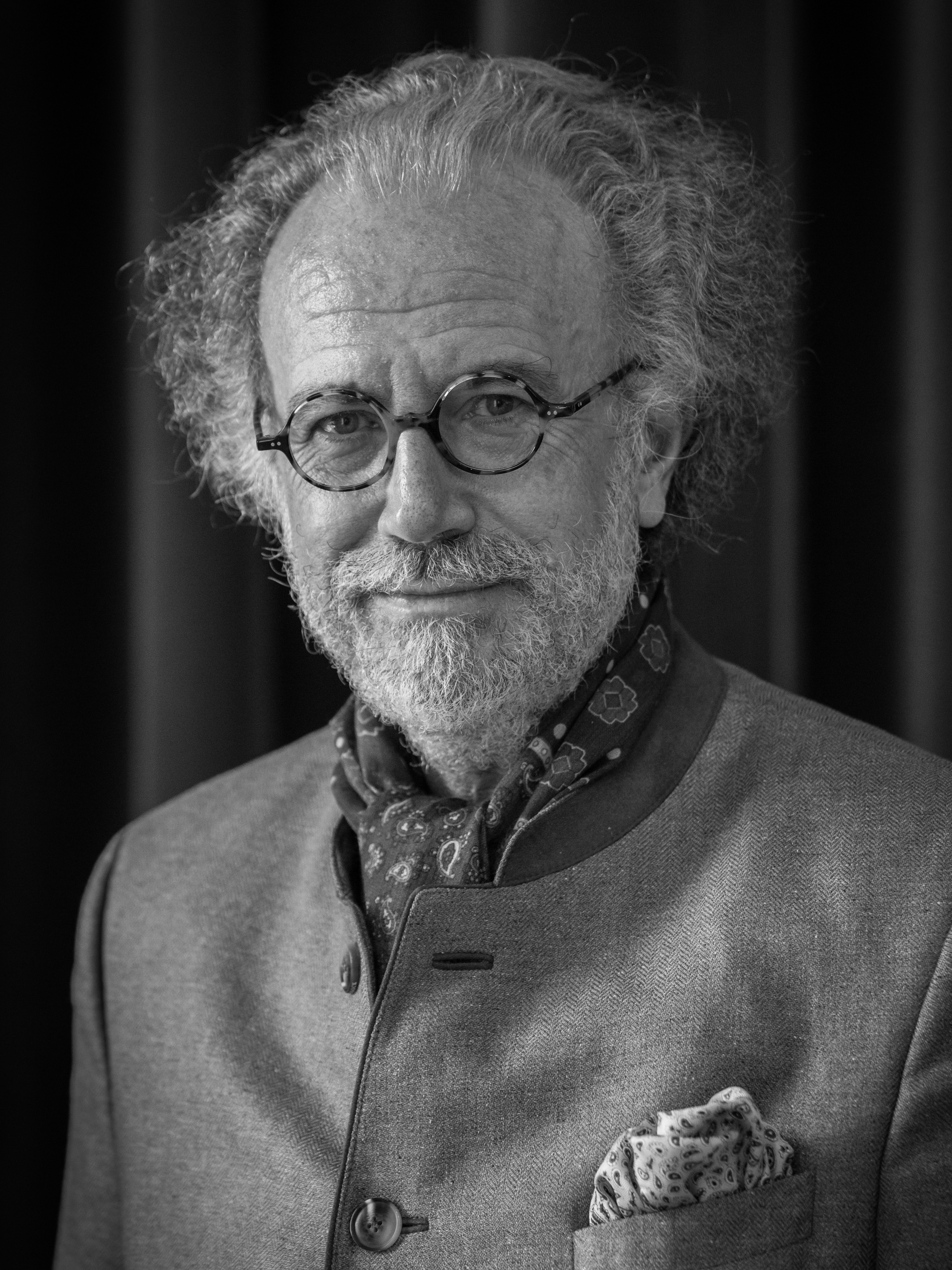
- Du Closel in 2015
- Born: 6 February 1956; Saint-Cloud, France
- Died: 7 October 2024 (aged 68); Le Puy-en-Velay, France
- Education: Royal Conservatory of Mons
- Occupations: Conductor; Composer
- Organizations: Forum Voix Etouffées
- Awards: Ordre des Arts et des Lettres; Decoration of Honour for Services to the Republic of Austria; Order of Merit of the Federal Republic of Germany

Amaury Barbat du Closel (6 February 1956 – 7 October 2024) was a French conductor and composer. He founded the Forum Voix Étouffées to bring attention to the music of composers persecuted, exiled or forgotten, especially suppressed by totalitarian regimes of the 20th century.

== Life and career ==
Born on 6 February 1956, du Closel was the son of Alain Barbat du Closel, who served as deputy mayor of Versailles from 1995 to 2001 and was a titular member of the Versailles Academy. Amaury studied musical composition with Max Deutsch at the Royal Conservatory of Mons in Belgium. He then took masterclasses in Vienna with Karl Österreicher and Charles Mackerras.

Throughout his career, du Closel directed more than 80 orchestras, notably the Berliner Symphoniker and the Orchestre Les Métamorphoses that he founded in 2018, to play on modern instruments in a historically informed manner, with a focus on music from the 20th century. He performed at festivals such as La Folle Journée in Nantes and La Chaise-Dieu. He was artistic director of the Opéra Nomade from 2000, a touring opera company, and from 2006 musical director of the Académie Lyrique, an international academy for operatic singing.

Du Closel founded in 2003 the Forum Voix Etouffées (transl. Suppressed Voices), an association dedicated to performing music by composers persecuted and forced into exile by Nazi Germany and other totalitarian governments of the 20th century, such as Ernst Krenek, Franz Schreker and Viktor Ullmann. In 2005 he published Les Voix étouffées du Troisième Reich, about composers persecuted by the Nazis. The book was awarded a prize for best essay from the Syndicat de la Critique Musicale.

He composed music including a chamber opera and songs, and music for classic silent film such as Victor Tourjanski's Michel Strogoff and Abel Gance's La Dixième symphonie. Du Closel died on 7 October 2024, at the age of 68.

== Publications ==
- 2005: Erstickte Stimmen. "Entartete Musik" im Dritten Reich ISBN 978-3-205-78292-6 (Les Voix étouffées du Troisième Reich) ISBN 978-2-7427-5264-5

== Distinctions ==
- 2005 Decoration of Honour for Services to the Republic of Austria
- 2009 Officer of the Ordre des Arts et des Lettres
- 2021 Order of Merit of the Federal Republic of Germany
