= Edward Carroll (musician) =

- Born: 1953
- Origin: Chicago, Illinois, United States
- Occupation(s): Musician, music teacher, professor
- Instrument: Trumpet

Edward Carroll is an American trumpeter. He is director of the Center for Advanced Musical Studies at Chosen Vale in Enfield, New Hampshire. He is also part of the faculty at the California Institute of the Arts, McGill University, and Dartmouth College.

Carroll has been the principal trumpet of the Rotterdam Philharmonic and the San Diego Symphony. His prior academic appointments include professorships at the Royal Academy of Music in London, and the Rotterdam Conservatory.

A native of Oak Park, Illinois, Carroll was inspired to take up the trumpet by a door-to-door trumpet salesman. He received his bachelor's and master's degrees from Juilliard.
