= Pierre Gillet (trumpeter) =

French classical trumpeter (born 1960)

- Born: August 9, 1960 (age 65); Terville, France
- Genres: Classical
- Occupations: Musician
- Instruments: Trumpet

Pierre Gillet (born 6 August 1960) is a French classical trumpeter.

== Biography ==
Born in Terville, Gillet followed the teaching of Pierre Thibaud in the trumpet class at the Conservatoire de Paris where he obtained a first prize. He is in his turn an assistant trumpet teacher at the same school and a professor at the 20th arrondissement of Paris conservatory.

He has been solo trumpeter of the Concerts Colonne and he is also soloist of the orchestra of the Opéra Bastille in Paris since 1984.

Since 1982, Pierre Gillet has been a member of the "Ensemble de trompettes de Paris" (Eutepé). With other musicians he founded the "Orchestre de Cuivres de Paris" and is its director. He is a member of the Ars Nova and Septentrion ensembles (brass quintet with piano and percussion).
