= Terville =

- Commune
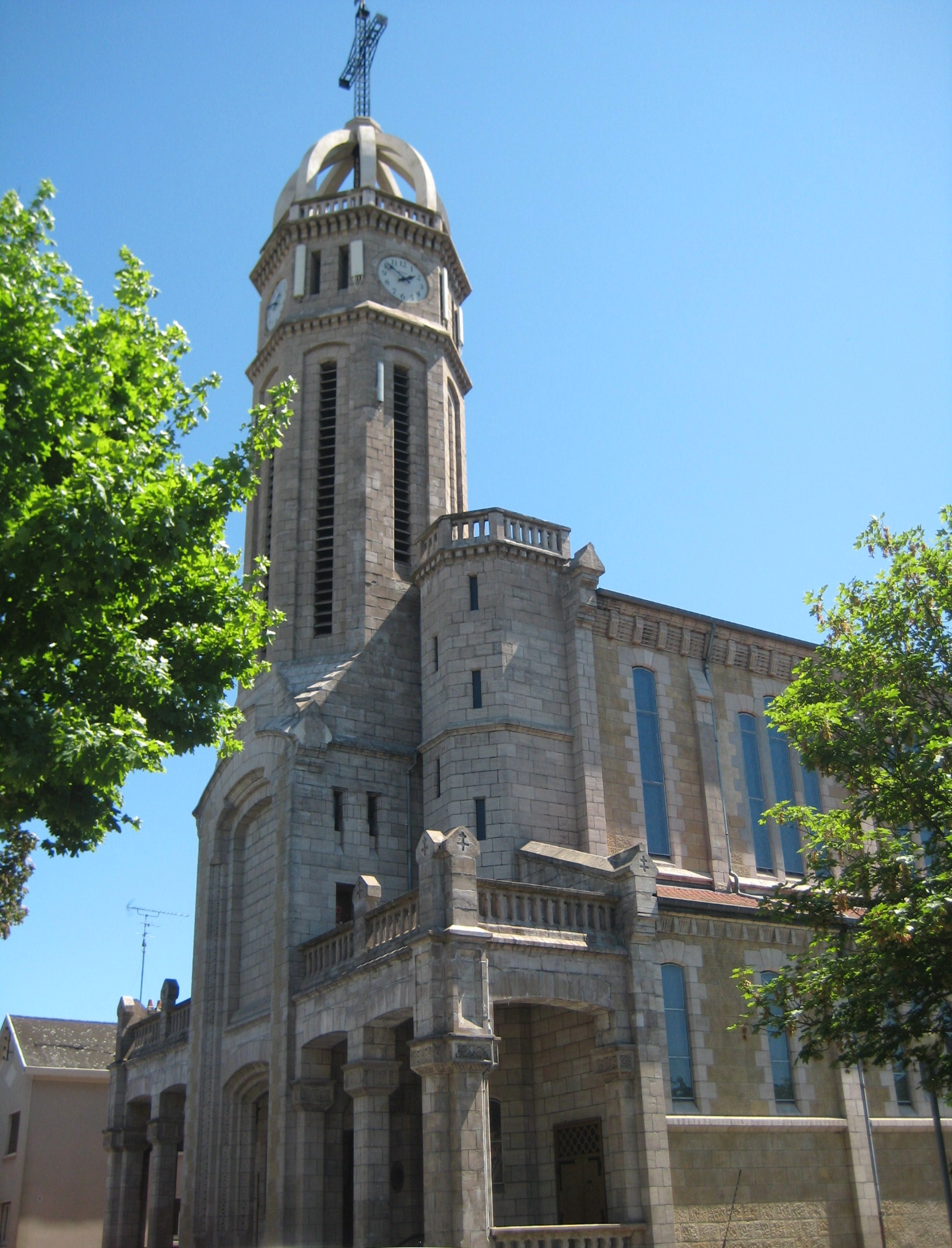
- The church in Terville

- Coat of arms
- Location of Terville
- Location within France Location within Grand Est
- Coordinates: 49°20′43″N 6°08′05″E
- Country: France
- Region: Grand Est
- Department: Moselle
- Arrondissement: Thionville
- Canton: Thionville
- Intercommunality: CA Portes de France-Thionville

Government
  - Mayor (2020–2026): Olivier Postal
- Area^{1}: 3.83 km^{2} (1.48 sq mi)
- Elevation: 160 m (520 ft)
- Highest elevation: 188 m (617 ft)
- Lowest elevation: 155 m (509 ft)
- Population (2023): 7,801
  - Density: 2,040/km^{2} (5,280/sq mi)
- Time zone: UTC+01:00 (CET)
  - Summer (DST): UTC+02:00 (CEST)
- INSEE/Postal code: 57666 /57180
- ^{1} French Land Register data, which excludes lakes, ponds, glaciers > 1 km^{2} (0.386 sq mi or 247 acres) and river estuaries.

Terville (French pronunciation: [tɛʁvil]; German: Terwen; Lorraine Franconian Tierwen) is a commune in the Moselle department in Grand Est in north-eastern France.

The trumpeter Pierre Gillet was born in Terville (6 August 1960).

== Population ==
Historical population
Year	Pop.	±% p.a.
1968	5,771	—
1975	5,747	−0.06%
1982	5,224	−1.35%
1990	6,281	+2.33%
1999	6,469	+0.33%
2007	6,479	+0.02%
2012	6,556	+0.24%
2017	7,025	+1.39%
2023	7,801	+1.76%
Source: INSEE

== See also ==
- Communes of the Moselle department
