= Carlos Grätzer =

Argentine composer

Carlos Grätzer is an Argentine composer born in Buenos Aires, Argentina, in 1956.

== Life and career ==
He was given his musical training by his father, Guillermo Graetzer (a student of Paul Hindemith).

He has divided his artistic work between music and cinema, making animated films, which became awarded films.

In 1984, he was given a scholarship by the French government, went to Paris and settled down. He has taken trainings courses at CNSMD of Paris, Darmstadt, IRCAM, Wellesley College (USA)…

Prizewinner at Alea III (Boston), Bourges, World Music Days 2000 and the International Rostrum of Composers at UNESCO. Grätzer’s music is performed by majors orchestras like Orchestre Philharmonique de Radio France, Orchestre National de France, Ensemble Intercontemporain, etc.

Carlos Grätzer has collaborated with the Ensemble Sillages in projects of music to be played with silent movies by Buster Keaton and John Emerson, commission of the French ministry of culture, it was premiered at the Brest European Short Film Festival (France), and “Georges Méliès, the magician of cinema”, commission of Geneva City.
