= Otto Sauter =

German trumpet soloist (born 1961)

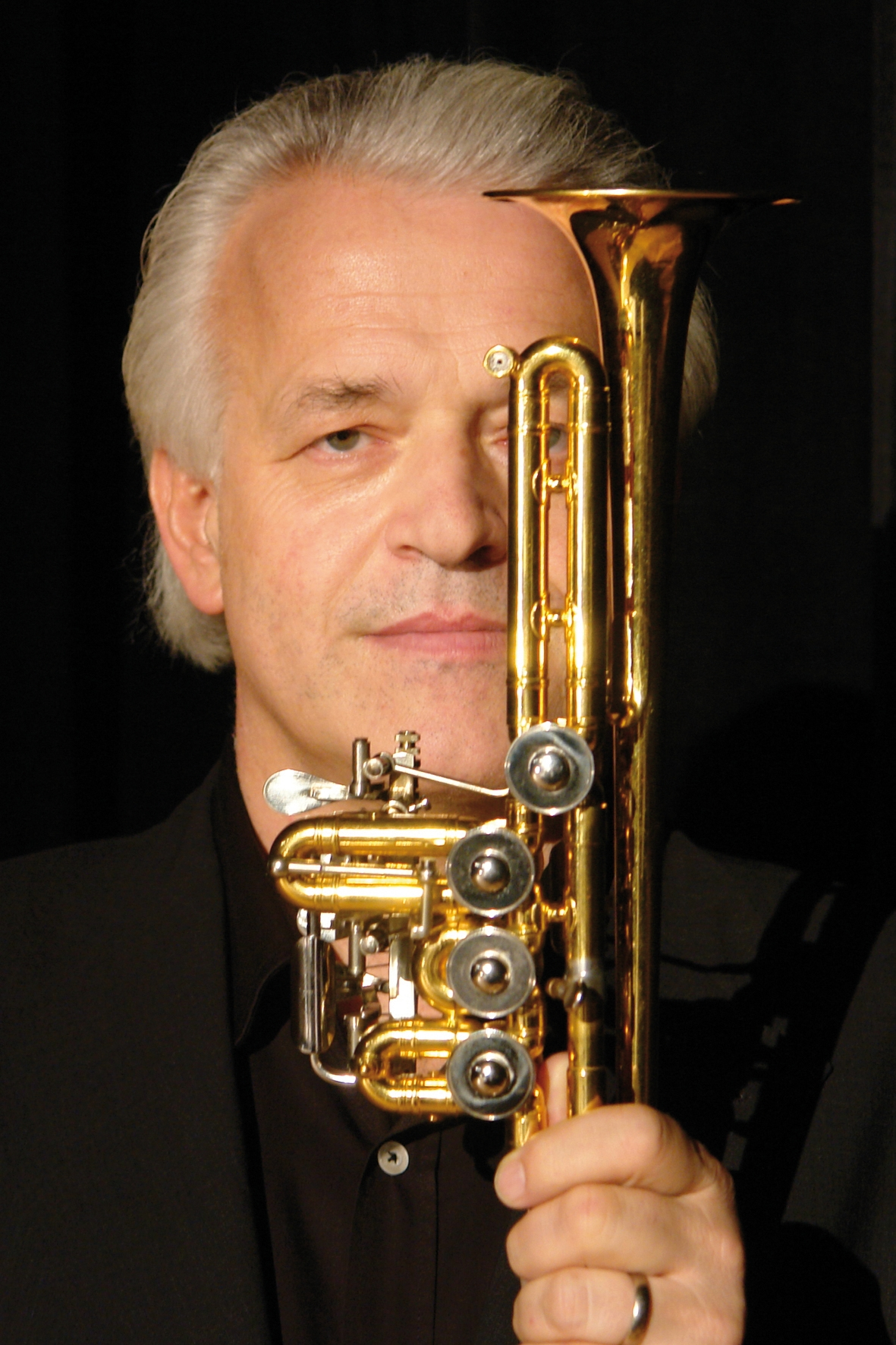
Otto Sauter (2011)

Otto Sauter (born 1961) is a German trumpet soloist, who specializes in the piccolo trumpet .

== Biography ==
From 1988 until 1998 Sauter was principal trumpet in the Bremen State Philharmonic Orchestra. In 1991 he founded the annual Bremen International Trumpet Festival, and, in 1994, the Bremen Trumpet Academy.

In 1995 he played with the Philharmonia Orchestra (London) in the presence of HRH Prince Charles at St. James‘s Palace, in 2000 at the Vatican in St. Peter‘s Square for Pope John Paul II and in 2001 with the China National Symphony Orchestra conducted by Muhai Tang in the Forbidden City in Beijing.

He recorded with EMI Classics a CD series of world premiere recordings World of Baroque, with rediscovered compositions of baroque and early classical masters like Alessandro Scarlatti, Georg Reutter and J. M. Molter, that had not been performed in the last 250 years.

Besides the baroque repertory, he has enlarged the repertory of contemporary original literature for piccolo trumpet with works by Julien-François Zbinden, Harald Genzmer and Jan Koetsier. In 2004 he premiered three pieces of the Czech composer Juraj Filas, whose teacher was a student of Dvořák, two of them at the Beethovenfest (Bonn). In 2008 he premiered a trumpet concerto for piccolo trumpet and symphony orchestra which was written for him by the Greek composer Mikis Theodorakis and arranged by Róbert Gulya in the Berlin and Cologne Philharmony.

In 2004 he founded the Wartburg Festival on the Wartburg, and in 2005 the international choir and music festival Musica Sacra a Roma in Rome and at the Vatican.

In 2006, for the 250th birthday of Mozart, he initiated the Little Amadeus & Friends Aktionstag for German grammar schools together with Peter Will, the television producer of the international children's TV series (awarded with the Echo Klassik in Germany). In 2007-2008 he initiated and played 80 Little Amadeus Live concerts in Germany, Austria and Switzerland.

Otto Sauter is artistic director of the ensemble Ten of the Best and has worked with orchestras and artists like RSO Prague, RSO MDR and HR, Czech Philharmonic, Malmö Symphony Orchestra, Beethoven Orchester Bonn, Bachcollegium Leipzig, Sinfonia Varsovia, Münchner Kammerorchester, Cappella Istropolitana, Edita Gruberová, José Carreras, Gösta Winbergh, Ivo Pogorelić, Elena Bashkirova, Jochen Kowalski, Mario Adorf, Michael Mendl, Zubin Mehta, Daniel Barenboim, Christoph Poppen, Marcello Viotti.

To mark the 50-year anniversary of UNICEF Deutschland he gave a series of concerts in Germany. Each year he invites international artists like Montserrat Caballé and Bobby McFerrin to give a joint concert for the Otto Sauter Foundation on the shores of Lake Constance.

== Discography ==
According to the German National Library:

- Rendez-Vous Royal I - Trompete & Orgel, Otto Sauter (Solo Piccolotrompete), Christian Schmitt (Orgel)
- Rendez-Vous Royal II - Trompete & Orgel, World Premiere Recordings *, Otto Sauter (Solo Piccolotrompete), Christian Schmitt (Orgel), Franz Wagnermeyer (zweite Trompete)
- DVD zur Telemann CD Box, aus dem Schloss Schwetzingen, Otto Sauter (Solo Piccolotrompete), Kurpfälzisches Kammerorchester, Nicol Matt (Dirigent)
- Die Trompete in Salzburg (CD 1/2), Otto Sauter (Solo Piccolotrompete), Franz Wagnermeyer (zweite Trompete), Capella Istropolitana, Nicol Matt (Brilliant Classics)
- Die Trompete in Wien (CD 1/2), Otto Sauter (Solo Piccolotrompete), Franz Wagnermeyer (zweite Trompete), Capella Istropolitana, Nicol Matt (Brilliant Classics)
- Johann Melchior Molter Trumpet Concertos Complete (ca. 1695 - 1765)(2 CD BOX), Otto Sauter (Solo Piccolotrompete), CAPPELLA Istropolitana, Nicol Matt (Dirigent), Franz Wagnermeyer (zweite Trompete) (Brilliant Classics)
- The complete works for trumpet and orchestra of Georg Philipp Telemann (1681–1767) (4 CD BOX), Otto Sauter (Solo Piccolotrompete), CAPPELLA Istropolitana, Nicol Matt (Dirigent), Franz Wagnermeyer (zweite Trompete) (Brilliant Classics)
- World of Baroque V, Otto Sauter (Solo Piccolotrompete), Maki Mori (Soprano), Philharmonisches Staatsorchester Halle, Dirigent Marcus Bosch (EMI Classics)
- World of Baroque IV, Otto Sauter (Solo Piccolotrompete), David Timm (organ) (EMI Classics)
- World of Baroque III, Otto Sauter (Solo Piccolotrompete), David Timm (Orgel) (EMI Classics)
- World of Baroque II, Otto Sauter (Solo Piccolotrompete), Cappella Istropolitana, Volker Schmidt-Gertenbach (Dirigent) (EMI Classics)
- World of Baroque I, Otto Sauter (Solo Piccolotrompete), Cappella Istropolitana, Volker Schmidt-Gertenbach (Dirigent) (EMI Classics)
- Contrasts for trumpets, Anthony Plog, Otto Sauter, Bo Nilsson, Urban Agnas, Claes Stroemblad, Howard Snell (Leitung)
- Ten of the Best & Friends, Sting Gitarrist Dominic Miller, Level 42 Leyboarder Mike Lindup, Sting Percussionist Rhani Krija
- Playtime Live - Pop Classics, Otto Sauter & Ten of the Best & Nürnberger Symphoniker, István Dénés (Dirigent)
- Ten of the Best - Live in Concert, Otto Sauter & Ten of the Best
- Christmas Melodies, Otto Sauter & Ten of the Best (EMI Classics)
