= François Boulanger =

French conductor

François Boulanger (born 14 December 1961 in Oran) is a French conductor.

Boulanger was awarded five first prizes at the Conservatoire de Paris.

A percussionist, pianist and organist, he later revealed himself at three major international events for which he was a laureate: the Besançon International Music Festival, the percussion of Paris and the Geneva International Music Competition.

On the strength of these successes, he was invited at a very young age to play solo (percussion, organ) with orchestras such as the new orchestre philharmonique de Radio France, and to conduct the Opéra de Paris orchestra, the Orchestre National de Lyon, the orchestre national de Lille, the Orchestre national de Montpellier Languedoc-Roussillon, the Radio Télévision Luxembourg orchestra, the Oslo Philharmonic, the Moscow Philharmonic Orchestra, and the Paris and Lyon conservatories orchestras.

In 1997, he was appointed to head the musical ensembles of the Republican Guard, a symphony orchestra and harmony orchestra with which he performs both in France and abroad.

Ninth director since the creation of the French Republican Guard Band in 1848, he strives to preserve throughout France and the world the French musical tradition.
