= French Republican Guard Band =

Military band unit of the French Republican Guard

Republican Guard Band
- Orchestre de la Garde républicaine
- Active: 1848–present
- Country: France
- Part of: Republican Guard
- Garrison/HQ: Paris
- Website: Official website

Commanders
- Current commander: Colonel François Boulanger

The Republican Guard Band (French: Orchestre de la Garde républicaine) is a military band unit of the French Republican Guard, which is part of the National Gendarmerie. The band is composed of 120 professional musicians from national conservatories. As the senior band and field music unit of the French Armed Forces, it is aimed towards active participation as the musical accompaniment in all national events.

== History ==
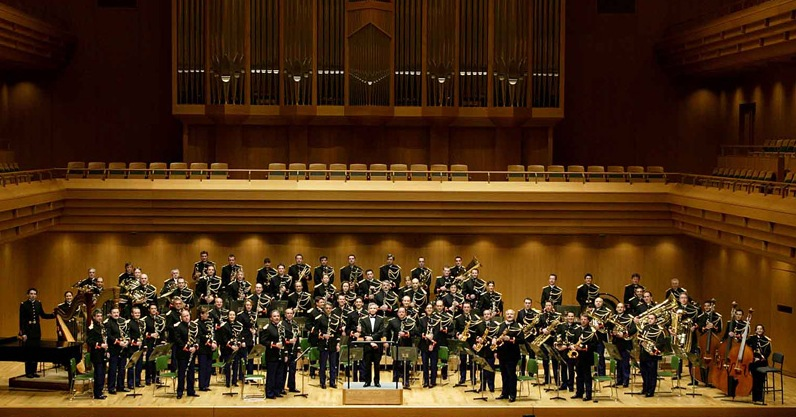
The Concert Band

The band was founded in 1848 (178 years ago) by Jean-Georges Paulus. Its official debut dates back to 1852, when a concert was organized in honor of Jean Paulus, its founder and the first leader of the band.

The band made its first international performance in 1871, when it traveled to the United States. Since then, the musicians of the band have made numerous tours all over the world.

In 1993, the band was given its current name and was transferred to the Republican Guard. Since March 1, 1997, the band has been under the command of Colonel François Boulanger, with Lieutenant-Colonel Sébastien Billiard as his deputy. The band performed at the 2024 Summer Olympics opening ceremony.

== Composition ==
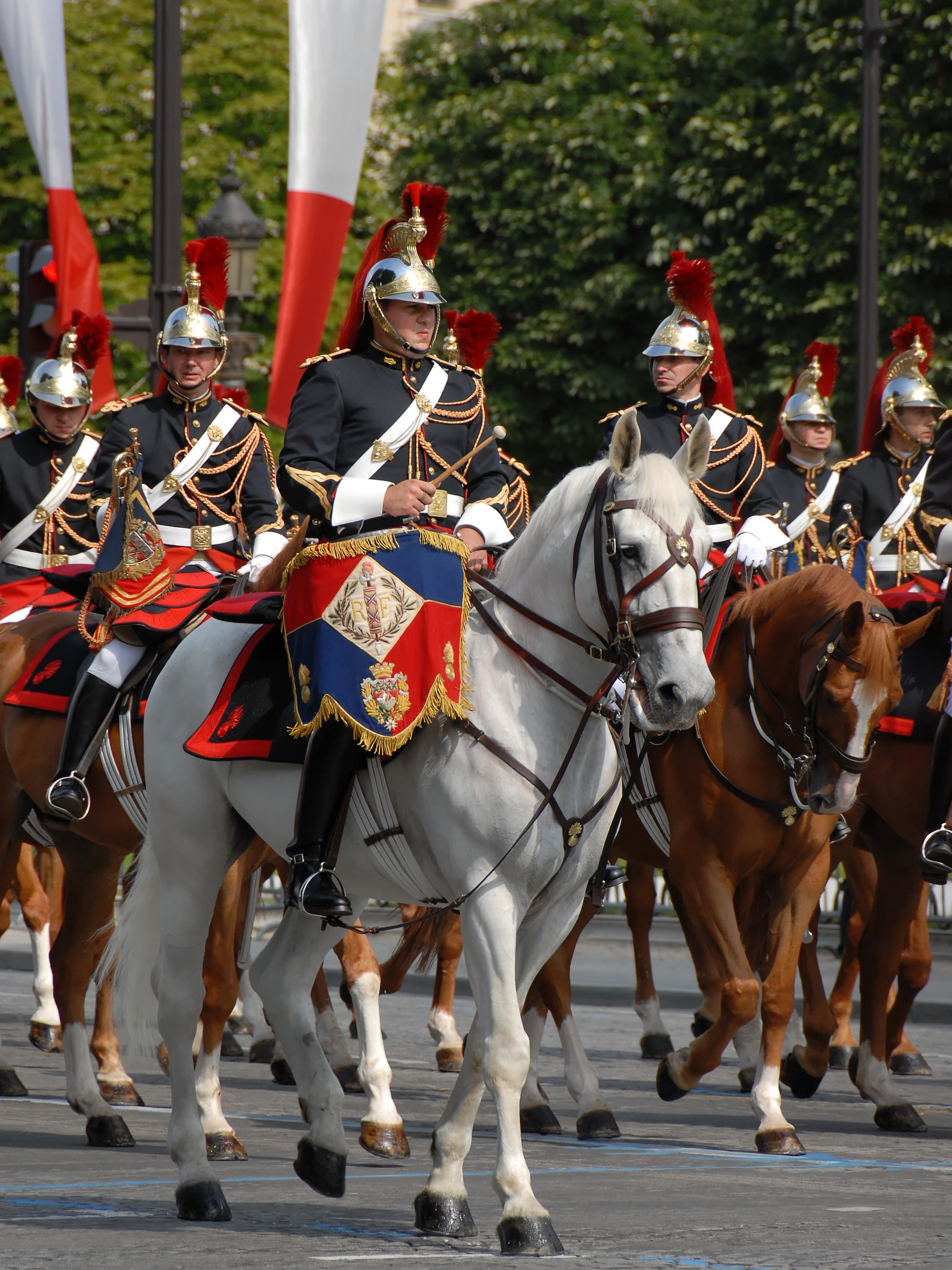
The mounted band

- Infantry Band of the Republican Guard
- Fanfare band Section
  - Fanfare Band 1
  - Fanfare Band 2
- Mounted Fanfare Band
- Concert Band (80 musicians)
- String Orchestra (40 musicians), likely to be presented in configurations of 24 or 12 bows, or in string quartets
- Symphony Orchestra
- String Quartet
- Napoleonic Drumline
- Hunting Horn Platoon

== Activities ==
The concert band and string orchestra perform either separately or as a combined ensemble during state dinners, festivals, or government organized concerts with the French Army Choir, sometimes the role is played upon the symphony orchestra and the Fanfare Bands. The Infantry Band and Fanfare Bands also perform during the annual Bastille Day military parade in Paris.

As a general rule the bandsmen wear the blue uniform of the Republican Guard in all functions. In full dress the Infantry Band wears a shako, the mounted band wears a dragoon helmet.

== Notable members and collaborators ==
- Raymond Guiot
- Roger Boutry
- Henri Couillaud
- Bernard Galais
- Romain Leleu
- Jean-Georges Paulus
- Pierre Thibaud
- Marcel Mule

== Unit music ==
=== Marches ===
- Defile de la Garde Républicaine
- Le Régiment de Sambre et Meuse
- Marche Lorraine
- Colonel Dupuy March
- Musique de la Garde républicaine de Paris
- Marche de la Garde Consulaire and La Victoire est à Nous

The band performing the Chant du Départ

=== Songs ===
- La Marseillaise
- Chant du départ
- La nuit américaine
- La Madelon

=== Bugle Calls ===
- Aux Champs

== See also ==
- French Foreign Legion Music Band (MLE)
- Republican Guard (France)
- Military band
- National Gendarmerie
