= Martín Matalon =

Argentine composer and musician

Martin Matalon (born Buenos Aires in 1958) is an Argentine composer and musician, and recipient of the 2005 Grand Prix des Lycéens and 2001 Prix de L'Institut de France Académie des Beaux Arts. He was a student of music during his early life, attending both Boston Conservatory of Music and the Juilliard School of Music.

== Compositions ==
- Formas de Arena for Flute, Viola and Harp (2001)
- Traces II for Viola Solo and Live Electronics (2005)
- Trame VI for Viola and Chamber Orchestra (2003)
