= List of tubists =

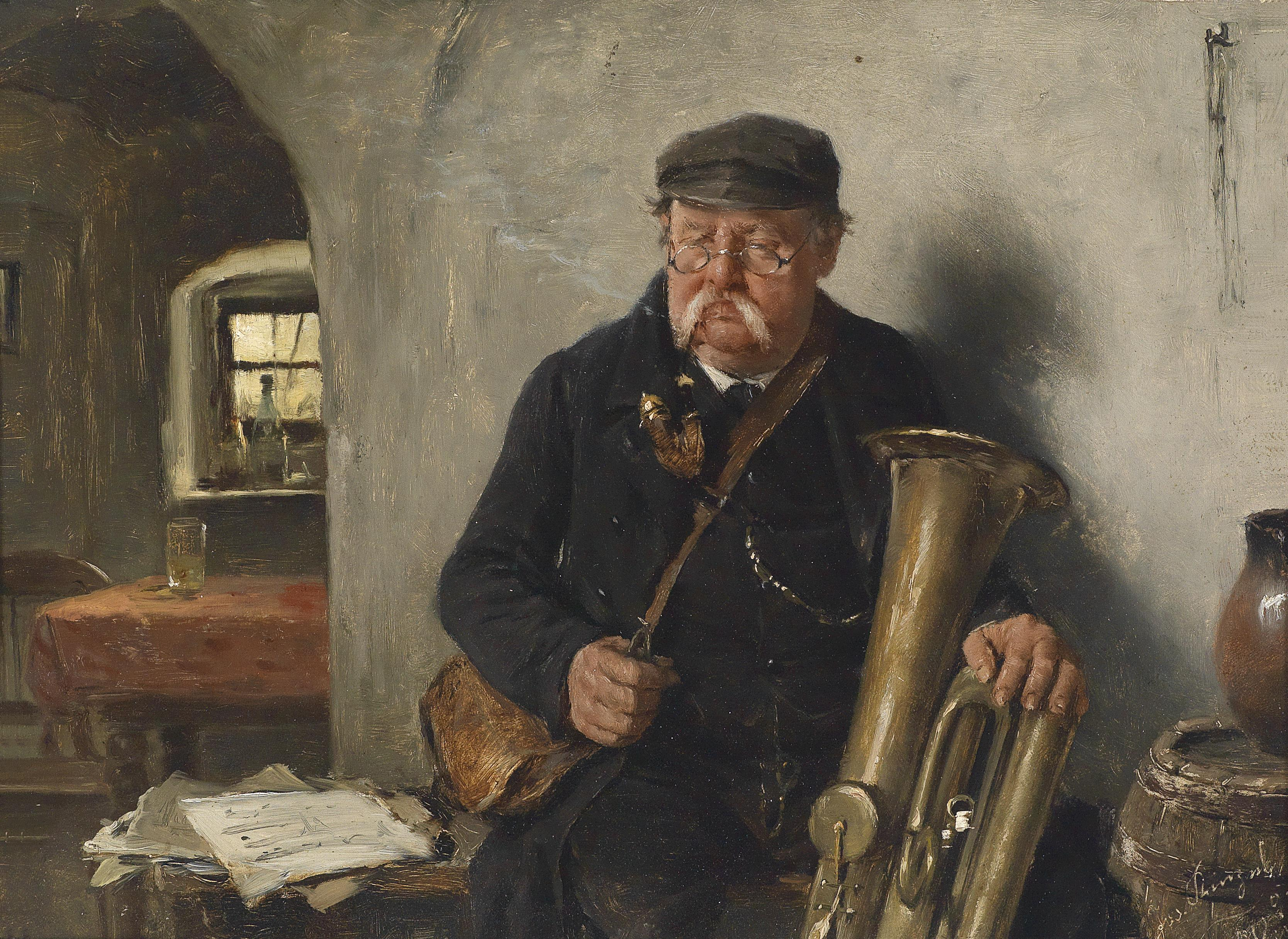
The Tuba Player by Josef Kinzel, 1892

The tuba has been played since its invention in the mid-19th century, in the midst of the Romantic period of Western Classical music. Along with classical music, the instrument appears in a variety of jazz styles as well as film and circus music. Most professional tubists are tied to symphony orchestras, bands (including brass, concert and military bands), or academic institutions. A smaller minority spend their careers as solo or chamber musicians.

Among the instrument's notable classical performers are William Bell, John Fletcher, Arnold Jacobs and Harvey Phillips. Noted Jazz players include Don Butterfield, Howard Johnson and Michel Godard. Accomplished soloist and chamber musicians include James Gourlay, Øystein Baadsvik, Velvet Brown and August Schieldrop. Tubists who played primarily for film scores are John Van Houten, Tommy Johnson and Jim Self.

== Tubists ==
List of tuba players
Image	Name	Lifetime	Nationality	Genre	Notes
	Walter English	1867–1916	American	Circus	Played in various bands
	William Bell	1902–1971	American	Classical	The leading player and teacher of the early 20th century. Played in the New York Philharmonic Orchestra, the Sousa Band, Cincinnati Symphony Orchestra, NBC Symphony Orchestra.
	Joe Tarto	1902-1986	American	Jazz	played with Cliff Edwards, Paul Specht, Sam Lanin, and Vincent Lopez, in addition to doing arrangement work for Fletcher Henderson and Chick Webb and playing in pit orchestras on Broadway. He also recorded copiously throughout the 1920s, accompanying musicians including Bing Crosby, The Boswell Sisters, Ethel Waters, Eddie Lang, Joe Venuti, Miff Mole, Red Nichols, The Dorsey Brothers, Bix Beiderbecke, and Phil Napoleon. He wrote several essential guidebooks for jazz bass players.
	Min Leibrook	1903–1943	American	Jazz	Played with The Wolverines, the Paul Whiteman Orchestra, Bix Beiderbecke and Lennie Hayton.
Squire Gersh		1913–1983	American	Jazz	Also a double bassist, played with Lu Watters, Bob Scobey, Turk Murphy, and Mutt Carey and Louis Armstrong, among others
Arnold Jacobs		1915–1998	American	Classical	A leading player and teacher of the 20th century. Principal tubist with Chicago Symphony Orchestra, Pittsburgh Symphony Orchestra, Indianapolis Symphony Orchestra
Red Callender		1916–1992	American	Jazz	Performed with an "unusual fluency and mobility". Played with Louis Armstrong, Lester and Lee Young, Erroll Garner, Charlie Parker, Wardell Gray, Dexter Gordon, Julia Lee, Art Tatum, Stuff Smith, Buddy Collette, James Newton, Gerry Wiggins, John Carter and B. Bumble and the Stingers
Don Butterfield		1923–2006	American	Jazz	Leading Jazz musician of his time; had a uniquely florid playing ability and added considerable nuance to basslines. Member of the Radio City Music Hall orchestra. Performed with Charles Mingus, Teo Macero, Teddy Charles, Bill Evans and The Thad Jones/Mel Lewis Orchestra
Harvey Phillips		1929–2010	American	Classical	A leading player and teacher of the 20th century. Founded the New York Brass Quintet
Constance Weldon		1932–2020	American	Classical	First female professional tubist
Dietrich Unkrodt		1934–2006	German	Various	Principal tubist of the Komische Oper Berlin (1960s–2000). Played in jazz duos with Hannes Zerbe
	Clifford Bevan	1934–2024	British	Classical	Principal tuba with Royal Liverpool Philharmonic (1964–1972). English tubist, musicologist and early music specialist playing ophicleide, cimbasso and serpent. Wrote The Tuba Family, a standard text on the history of low brass instruments.
Ronald Bishop		1934–2013	American	Classical	Principal tubist of the Cleveland Orchestra (1967–2005). Taught at the Cleveland Institute of Music, Oberlin Conservatory and Baldwin Wallace University
Everett M. Gilmore		1935–2005	American	Classical	Former principal tubist of the Dallas Symphony Orchestra (1965–95). Taught at University of North Texas College of Music and Southern Methodist University
Tommy Johnson		1935–2006	American	Film	Taught privately at The University of Southern California and at The University of California, Los Angeles; performed in over 2,000 film scores
Roger Bobo		1938–2023	American	Classical	Principal tubist of the Los Angeles Philharmonic (1964–89). Taught at the Musashino Academia Musicae, the Fiesole School of Music, the Lausanne Conservatory, the Rotterdams Konservatorium, and the Royal Northern College of Music.
Ray Draper		1940–1982	American	Jazz	Played with Jackie McLean, Donald Byrd, John Coltrane, Max Roach and Don Cherry, among others
John Fletcher		1941–1987	English	Classical	A leading player and teacher of the 20th century. Played in the BBC Symphony Orchestra, London Symphony Orchestra and Philip Jones Brass Ensemble
	R. Winston Morris	1941–	American	Classical	Long time instructor at Tennessee Tech
	Howard Johnson	1941–2021	American	Jazz	Also a baritone saxophonist and bandleader, he played in the SNL band and with Charles Mingus, Hank Crawford, Rahsaan Roland Kirk, Archie Shepp, Hank Mobley and Gil Evans, among others.
Dave Bargeron		1942–2025	American	Jazz	Primarily a trombone player, he played with Blood, Sweat, and Tears, Doc Severinsen's Band, Gil Evans Orchestra, Paul Simon, Mick Jagger, James Taylor, Eric Clapton, David Sanborn, Pat Metheny among others.
Giancarlo Schiaffini		1942–	Italian	Jazz	Primarily a trombonist. Closely associated with avant-garde music, free improvisation and free jazz
Jim Self		1943–2025	American	Film	Los Angeles session musician for over 1500 film soundtracks; tubist with Hollywood Bowl Orchestra, Pasadena Symphony, Pacific Symphony, Los Angeles Opera
	Bob Stewart	1945–	American	Jazz	Also an educator, and studio musician; Professor at the Juilliard School and a "Distinguished Lecturer" at Lehman College
	Charles Daellenbach	1945–	Canadian	Various	Co-founder of Canadian Brass
Samuel Pilafian		1949–2019	American	Various	Empire Brass; Arizona State University; North Dakota State University
Anthony Lacen		1950–2004	American	Jazz	
John D. Stevens		1951–	American	Various	Professor at University of Wisconsin–Madison; composer/arranger; member of The Wisconsin Brass Quintet; formerly taught at The University of Miami
Gene Pokorny		1953–	American	Classical	Principal tubist of the Chicago Symphony Orchestra (since 1989). He teaches at Northwestern University
Scott Irvine		1953–	Canadian	Classical	Principal tubist of the Canadian Opera Company Orchestra and Esprit Orchestra; tubist of True North Brass.
Tony Clements		1954–	American	Classical	Principal tubist of the Symphony Silicon Valley (since 2002); formerly principal of the SJS (1981–2001)
David Fedderly		1954–	American	Classical	Former Principal tubist for the Baltimore Symphony Orchestra (1983–2014). Former instructor at The Juilliard School and Peabody Institute
	James Gourlay	1956–	British	Classical	Soloist and chamber musician. Teaches at Duquesne University and directs the River City Brass Band. Formerly Deputy Principal and music director at the Royal Conservatoire of Scotland and Head of the Royal Northern College of Music
James Akins		1956–2025	American	Classical	Principal tubist of the Columbus Symphony Orchestra (beginning in 1981). Professor of Tuba/Euphonium (1994 - 2025) at The Ohio State University
John Van Houten		1957–	American	Film	Played in various movies
Norman Pearson		1957/58–	American	Classical	Former principal tubist of the Los Angeles Philharmonic (1993–2020)
	Walter Hilgers	1959–	German	Classical	Formerly principal tubist of the Vienna Philharmonic Orchestra
	Michel Massot	1960–	Belgian	Jazz	Founder of Trio Bravo; teaches at the Royal Conservatoire of Liège.
	Michel Godard	1960–	French	Jazz	Taught tuba and serpent at the Conservatoire de Paris. Plays avant-garde and jazz tuba and serpent with numerous musicians.
Jeffrey Anderson		1962–	American	Classical	Principal tubist of the San Francisco Symphony (since 2017); formerly principal of the RCO. Teaches at the San Francisco Conservatory of Music
	Marcus Rojas	1963–	American	Various	Plays in the Spanish Fly jazz group. Has played with the Metropolitan Opera and New York City Ballet, among other ensembles. Teaches at New York University, State University of New York at Purchase, and Brooklyn College
	Heiko Triebener	1964–	German	Classical	Principal tubist of the Bamberger Symphoniker (since 1993). Teaches at the Hochschule für Musik Würzburg
Alan Baer		c. 1960s–	American	Classical	Principal tubist of the New York Philharmonic (since 2004); formerly principal of the MSO, LPO and LBSO. Teaches at the Juilliard School, Rutgers University and the Mannes School of Music
	Øystein Baadsvik	1966–	Norwegian	Soloist	Soloist and chamber musician
Nedra Johnson		1966–	American	Jazz	Daughter of the tubist Howard Johnson
Yasuhito Sugiyama		1967–	Japanese	Classical	Principal tubist of the Cleveland Orchestra (since 2006); formerly principal of the VSOO
Tom Heasley		Late 1960s	American	Ambient	Composer, performer, and recording artist.
Kenneth Amis		1970–	American	Various	Tubist of Empire Brass
	Bennie Pete	1976–	American	Jazz	Founder of the Hot 8 Brass Band
Velvet Brown		c. 1980s–	American	Classical	Soloist and chamber musician. Professor of tuba and euphonium at Pennsylvania State University
	Bill Muter	1984–	American	Avant-garde tubist	Also a bassist, he is known for his book A Practical Approach (2012)
Carol Jantsch		1985–	American	Classical	Principal tubist of the Philadelphia Orchestra (since 2006); the first woman tubist in a major US orchestra. Teaches at Yale University and Temple University
	Thomas Leleu	1987–	French	Classical	Principal tubist of the Opera de Marseille (since 2006)
Aubrey Foard		c. 1990s–	American	Classical	Principal tubist of the Baltimore Symphony Orchestra (since 2018); formerly principal of the CSO and WVSO
	Theon Cross	1993–	British	Jazz	Tubist of the London-based group Sons of Kemet
August Schieldrop		1999–	Norwegian	Classical	Soloist and chamber musician

== See also ==
- List of euphonium players
- Lists of musicians
