= Tuba Concerto (Vaughan Williams) =

Concerto by Ralph Vaughan Williams

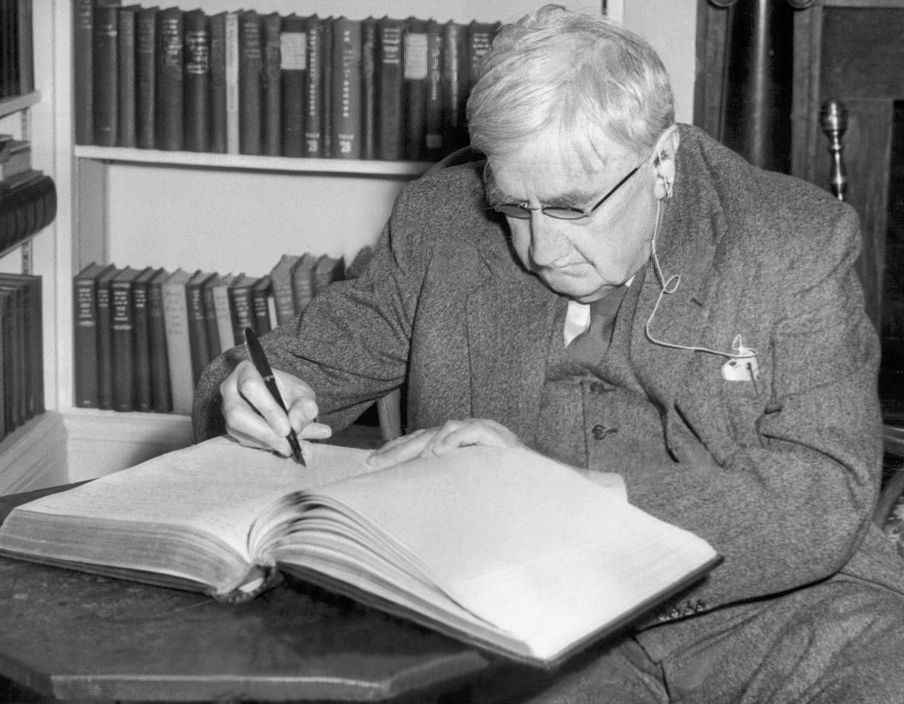
Ralph Vaughan Williams in 1954

The Concerto in F Minor for Bass Tuba and Orchestra by British composer Ralph Vaughan Williams was written in 1954 for Philip Catelinet, principal tubist of the London Symphony Orchestra (LSO), who together gave the premiere on 13 June 1954 with Sir John Barbirolli conducting. The same musicians made the work’s first recording that same year. This concerto was the first concerto written for solo tuba.

== Composition and history ==
While at first viewed by critics as the eccentric idea of an aging composer, the concerto soon became one of Vaughan Williams' most popular works and an essential part of the tuba repertoire.

The work is in three movements:

1. Prelude: Allegro moderato
2. Romanza: Andante sostenuto
3. Finale – Rondo alla tedesca: Allegro

A performance commonly takes about 13 minutes. Apart from the solo tuba, the piece is scored for two flutes (2nd doubling on piccolo), oboe, 2 clarinets (in B♭), bassoon, 2 horns (in F), 2 trumpets (in B♭), 2 trombones, timpani, triangle, snare drum, bass drum, cymbals, and strings.

A version exists for euphonium, transposed to B♭ minor by David Childs, with Vaughan Williams's orchestration transposed and rearranged by Rodney Newton.

== Recordings ==
The concerto has since received a large number of concert performances and recordings. Live performances include those by Arnold Jacobs, William Bell, and Roger Bobo.

In addition to the first recording by Catelinet and the LSO, other recordings of the concerto have featured the following artists:

- Øystein Baadsvik (soloist); Singapore Symphony Orchestra with Anne Manson, conductor (BIS)
- John Fletcher (soloist); London Symphony Orchestra with André Previn, conductor (RCA SB #6868)
- James Gourlay (soloist); Royal Ballet Sinfonia with Gavin Sutherland, conductor (Naxos)
- Peter Whish-Wilson (soloist); Adelaide Symphony Orchestra with David Stanhope, conductor (ABC)
