= Tarita =

Tarita may refer to the following notable people:

Given name

- Tarita Teriipaia (born 1941), French Polynesian actress, wife of Marlon Brando
- Tarita Virtue (born 1970), Trinidadian-American private investigator and model

Surname

- Elena Tărîță (born 1954), Romanian sprinter
