= Jeffrey Anderson (tubist) =

American tubist (born 1962)

- Born: September 21, 1962 (age 64); Princeton, Illinois
- Education: Carmel High School (Indiana); Indiana University School of Music; Arizona State University
- Occupations: Tubist, soloist, clinician, teacher and chamber musician
- Years active: 1984–present

Jeffrey Anderson (born September 21, 1962) is an American tuba player. As of 2017, he is the Principal Tubist in the San Francisco Symphony.

== Biography ==
Anderson was educated at the Indiana University School of Music and Arizona State University. His teachers have included Harvey Phillips, Daniel Perantoni, Arnold Jacobs, Roger Bobo and Jim Self. He is an active soloist, clinician, chamber musician, and teacher. He has performed at the International Brass Conference, and is a frequent recitalist in the United States and abroad. He has been featured as a soloist with the Rochester Philharmonic Orchestra and the San Francisco Symphony.

He premiered the composition "Europa and the Bull" by composer Robin Holloway with the San Francisco Symphony on March 22 and 23, 2017.

As of 2017, Anderson teaches at the San Francisco Conservatory of Music.

Major orchestral appointments include:

- Rochester Philharmonic Orchestra, (Christopher Seaman, cond.)
- San Francisco Symphony, (Michael Tilson Thomas, cond.)
