= John Van Houten =

John Van Houten could refer to:

- John G. Van Houten (1904-1974), U.S. Army general
- John Van Houten (tubist) (born 1957), American musician
