= Muter =

Muter is a surname. Notable people with the surname include:

- Bill Muter (born 1984), American musician, educator, and author
- George Muter (died 1810), American settler
- Joseph Muter (1780–1840), British soldier of the Napoleonic Wars
- Mela Muter (1876–1967), Jewish painter
