= Constance Weldon =

American tuba player (1932–2020)

Background information
- Born: January 25, 1932; Winter Haven, Florida
- Died: August 7, 2020 (aged 88)
- Occupations: Musician, academic
- Instrument: Tuba
- Years active: 1951–1991

Constance Weldon (January 25, 1932 – August 7, 2020) was an American tuba player, who was the first woman to play the instrument in a major American orchestra.

== Early life ==
Constance Janet Weldon was born in Winter Haven, Florida, on January 25, 1932. Her father, George, was a groundskeeper and soon after Weldon was born the family moved to Miami, where he worked on the Vizcaya estate. Her mother Edythe Roebke was a teacher. Weldon started playing instruments at school, and by the time she was due to graduate from Miami Jackson High School, she had decided to study at the University of Miami and specialise in tuba performance. She reportedly "fell in love with the tuba" after her father brought one home from a pawn shop.

== Career ==
Weldon's performance career began in 1951 after auditioning for the Tanglewood Music Festival. She spent the summer performing there and as a result was offered a position with the Rio de Janeiro Symphony Orchestra, but declined in order to finish her degree. She graduated with a BA in 1953 and continued to study for an MA in education.

Weldon performed again at the Tanglewood Music Festival in 1954, then in 1955 joined Arthur Fiedler’s Boston Pops Orchestra, who she performed with for two seasons. This meant she was the first female tuba player in a major American orchestra. She moved from Boston to perform with the North Carolina Symphony from 1956 to 1957. From North Carolina she moved to Amsterdam, funded by a Fulbright Scholarship, in order to study with Adrian Boorsma. Whilst there she became Acting Principal for the Royal Concertgebouw Orchestra. She also worked for the Netherlands Ballet Orchestra. On her return to America, Weldon joined the Kansas City Philharmonic.

In 1960 Weldon joined the University of Miami, as a full-time professor of tuba. During her time there she was the founder and director of the University of Miami Tuba Ensemble. The foundation of tuba chamber music ensembles by Weldon was pioneering. She taught at the university until her retirement in 1991. In 1971 she was appointed Assistant Dean for Undergraduate Studies at the Frost School of Music. She also sponsored, with the University of Miami School of Music and the Tuba Society of Miami, the International Tuba Ensemble Competition Contest. Many of her students became notable tuba players, including: Mike Roylance, principal tuba at the Boston Symphony Orchestra; James Jenkins, principal with the Jacksonville Symphony; Sam Pilafian, founder of Empire Brass.

Weldon died of natural causes on August 7, 2020, according to her companion Linda Broadwell.

== Awards ==
- 1991 – University of Miami's Distinguished Alumna Award
- 1997 – International Women's Brass Conference Pioneer Award
- 2004 – International Tuba and Euphonium Association's Lifetime Achievement Award

== Selected publications ==
- Advanced tuba etudes – Bower Murphy (ed. by Weldon)
