= Everett M. Gilmore =

American tubist (1935–2005)

- Born: Everett Millard Gilmore, Jr. March 13, 1935; Wheeling, West Virginia, U.S.
- Died: April 14, 2005 (aged 70); Dallas, Texas, U.S.
- Education: Lebanon Valley College; University of Denver
- Occupations: Tubist, educator
- Years active: 1958–2005
- Spouse: Mary Crisp (m. 1977)
- Children: 1

Everett Millard "Ev" Gilmore, Jr. (December 13, 1935 – April 14, 2005) was an American tubist best known for his association with the Dallas Symphony Orchestra, in which he served as principal tubist from 1965 until his retirement in 1995. He was also closely associated with the University of North Texas College of Music and Southern Methodist University.

Gilmore's thirty-year tenure was one of the longest with an American orchestra for this time period. He was also one of the few American orchestral tubists during his time who played BBb tuba as their primary instrument.

Gilmore had a diverse influence on music in the Dallas–Fort Worth metroplex, not only as a performer but as teacher and mentor to other professional musicians.

== Life and performing career ==
Gilmore was born in Wheeling, West Virginia, to Everett Gilmore, Sr. and his wife Elizabeth, the eldest child of three brothers. He began studying music with piano lessons while in elementary school, his interest in music inspired by Elizabeth, who was a classically-trained pianist. In junior high, Gilmore began playing the trombone and continued performing on that instrument through college, the Army Bands, a career with the Dallas Symphony Orchestra and into retirement.

Gilmore attended George Williams College and Lebanon Valley College as a double major, receiving bachelor's degrees in both psychology and music.

After his undergraduate schooling, Gilmore joined the United States Army Field Band in Washington, D.C. The tuba section included two musicians who became professional tubists with major symphony orchestras: Gilmore and Ronald Bishop, tubist for the Cleveland Orchestra under George Szell. Gilmore volunteered for the opportunity to transfer to the NORAD Command Band located in Colorado Springs, Colorado.

Once his military commitment was fulfilled, he left the NORAD Band and earned a Master of Arts in library science from the University of Denver and worked for the Denver area public libraries. He soon won the audition for and performed with the Wichita Symphony Orchestra for two years. In May 1965, he won the principal tuba position in the Dallas Symphony Orchestra, where he played for thirty years until his retirement in 1995.

He studied tuba performance with Charles Guzsikoff of the Philadelphia Orchestra, William Bell of the New York Philharmonic and Arnold Jacobs of the Chicago Symphony Orchestra.

The music directors of the Dallas Symphony Orchestra during Gilmore's tenure included Donald Johanos, Anshel Brusilow, Max Rudolf, Eduardo Mata and Andrew Litton.

Gilmore continued his wide-ranging interests in music during his years with the Dallas Symphony Orchestra. He was the founder of several ensembles outside the orchestra. He was a charter member of The Dallas Symphony Brass Quintet, which recorded on Crystal Records. Gilmore's colleagues in the quintet were David Battey, horn; John Kitzman, trombone; Bert Truax and Richard Giangiulio, trumpets.

He was a co-founder of TUBACHRISTMAS concerts in both Dallas and Fort Worth. These two annual events have been among the most successful of TUBACHRISTMAS performances across the nation.

Gilmore was a leader in forming the Texas Tuba Quartet and later the Dallas Tuba Quartet, writing and arranging much of the music in those early days of the tuba quartet. He was also a charter member of the Texas Wind Symphony, which was conducted by Ray Lichtenwalter.

In addition to being a performer and an educator, Gilmore was a music copyist; he produced handwritten scores and parts for many composers and arrangers, including Alberto Ginastera, Phil Kelly, Tom Merriman and Robert Xavier Rodriguez.

Throughout his career, Gilmore was a Miraphone tuba artist.

=== Personal life ===
Gilmore married Mary Crisp in 1977. They had one daughter.

== Music influence ==
Gilmore taught advanced tuba players through private lessons and at Southern Methodist University during his tenure with the Dallas Symphony. Following his retirement from the orchestra, Gilmore taught at the University of North Texas College of Music.

Gilmore's legacy of musicians he influenced includes tuba students who play and teach professionally. Among his students were Donald Little, retired principal tubist of the Fort Worth Symphony Orchestra and current principal tubist of the Dallas Opera who worked on several recitals and concerts with Gilmore; Richard Murrow, principal tubist of the East Texas Symphony Orchestra, the Texas Chamber Orchestra, the Dallas Jazz Orchestra and the American Chamber Brass; Ed Jones, current principal tubist of the Fort Worth Symphony Orchestra; Richard Morgan, retired principal tubist of the Dallas Wind Symphony; Karl Hovey, retired principal tubist of the United States Navy Band; Lee Hipp, principal tubist of the San Antonio Symphony; Alex Cauthen, principal tubist of the Dallas Wind Symphony; Jeffery Cottrell, tubist of the Key City Brass Quintet; Justin Benavidez, principal tubist of Symphoria and the Syracuse Opera; and Wade Rackley of the Mississippi Symphony Orchestra.

== Legacy ==
Gilmore recorded with most of the music directors of the Dallas Symphony Orchestra, the majority of his discography of over 45 recordings on which Gilmore performs were with Maestro Eduardo Mata. The album recorded with the Dallas Symphony Brass Quintet was among the few quintet recordings available at the time.

In addition to his music career, Gilmore was involved in local and state political issues. He felt his progressive ideals of civil liberties were outlined in the Bill of Rights. One instance resulted in the James v. Gilmore case for the United States Supreme Court in late 1967, which dealt with unconstitutional loyalty oaths and Gilmore was the plaintiff in that case. Hired as an adjunct teacher for one student for the Dallas County Junior College, it insisted that Gilmore was to sign a loyalty oath. Eventually, on January 15, 1968, the court ruled that the oaths were unconstitutional.
