= Al Wallace =

American football player (born 1974)

No. 96
- Position: Defensive end

Personal information
- Born: March 25, 1974 (age 52); Delray Beach, Florida, U.S.
- Listed height: 6 ft 5 in (1.96 m)
- Listed weight: 275 lb (125 kg)

Career information
- High school: Spanish River Community (Boca Raton, Florida)
- College: Maryland
- NFL draft: 1997: undrafted

Career history
- Jacksonville Jaguars (1997)*; Philadelphia Eagles (1997–1999); Chicago Bears (2000); Miami Dolphins (2002)*; Carolina Panthers (2002–2006); Buffalo Bills (2007)
- * Offseason or practice squad member only

Career NFL statistics
- Total tackles: 143
- Sacks: 23
- Forced fumbles: 4
- Fumble recoveries: 5
- Interceptions: 4
- Defensive touchdowns: 1
- Stats at Pro Football Reference

Alonzo Dwight Wallace (born March 25, 1974) is an American former professional football player who was a defensive end in the National Football League (NFL) for the Jacksonville Jaguars, Philadelphia Eagles, Carolina Panthers and Buffalo Bills. He played college football for the Maryland Terrapins.

== Early life ==
Wallace attended Spanish River Community High School in Boca Raton, Florida. As a junior, he played running back and rushed for over 500 yards.

As a senior, he was a two-way player at outside linebacker and wide receiver, while tallying 31 receptions for 571 yards and 5 touchdowns. He also practiced basketball.

== College career ==
Wallace accepted a football scholarship from the University of Maryland, College Park, to play wide receiver in a run and shoot offense. He instead was moved to linebacker under head coach Mark Duffner.

As a redshirt freshman in 1993, he was a backup, playing in 9 games and making 18 tackles (10 solo). As a sophomore, he became a starter, registering 39 tackles (27 solo), 3 sacks (led the team) and 8 tackles for loss (led the team).

As a junior, he started 10 out of 11 games at outside linebacker, recording 47 tackles (38 solo) and 5 sacks. He also lined up at tight end in several games.

As a senior, he started 9 games, while making 40 tackles (33 solo) and being named to the AD's Honor Roll for the fifth consecutive semester. He finished his college career with 108 tackles and 12 sacks.

== Professional career ==
Wallace was signed by the Jacksonville Jaguars as an undrafted free agent after the 1997 NFL draft on April 21. He was tried at outside linebacker during training camp. He was waived on August 19 and later signed to the practice squad. He spent the first 13 regular season games on the team's practice squad before being released in November.

On December 2, 1997, he was signed as a free agent by the Philadelphia Eagles. On September 5, 1999, he was placed on the injured reserve list with a fractured and dislocated ankle. He was released on August 28, 2000.

In 2001, he signed as a free agent with the Chicago Bears. He was waived injured on August 28.

In March 2002, he signed as a free agent with the Miami Dolphins, after spending a year out of football. On July 19, he was traded along with a 4th round draft choice (#119-Colin Branch) to the Carolina Panthers in exchange for defensive end Jay Williams.

In 2002, he was a backup defensive end behind Julius Peppers and Mike Rucker. In 2003, he had 38 tackles, 5 sacks, 9 quarterback hurries, 5 passes defensed and 2 interceptions, while playing in Super Bowl XXXVIII. He also played a key role on a special teams unit that blocked 5 kicks in the first 2 games of the season.

Wallace, along with fellow Maryland alumni Kris Jenkins, Peppers, Rucker and Brentson Buckner established a formidable defensive line rotation from 2002 to 2006, which many experts considered to be among the best during that time span.

In 2006, he registered 30 tackles, 3 sacks and 13 quarterback hurries. On February 19, 2007, he was released because of salary cap reasons. He appeared for the Panthers in 80 regular season games and 7 postseason contests, while never missing a game.

On August 22, 2007, he was signed as a free agent by the Buffalo Bills, for depth purposes behind Aaron Schobel and Chris Kelsay. On September 1, he was placed on the injured reserve list. He wasn't re-signed after the season. During his career he played in 96 games, posting 187 tackles (126 solo), 23 sacks and 4 interceptions.

== NFL career statistics ==
Legend
	Led the league
**Bold**	Career high

=== Regular season ===
Year	Team	Games		Tackles				Interceptions				Fumbles			
Year	Team	GP	GS	Comb	Solo	Ast	Sck	Int	Yds	TD	Lng	FF	FR	Yds	TD
1997	PHI	1	0	0	0	0	0.0	0	0	0	0	0	0	0	0
1998	PHI	15	0	0	0	0	**6.0**	0	0	0	0	0	0	0	0
2002	CAR	16	4	29	25	4	3.0	0	0	0	0	1	**2**	0	**1**
2003	CAR	16	2	**38**	**30**	**8**	5.0	**2**	**58**	0	**53**	0	1	0	0
2004	CAR	16	0	26	23	3	1.0	0	0	0	0	**2**	1	0	0
2005	CAR	16	2	25	20	5	5.0	**2**	38	0	38	1	1	**6**	0
2006	CAR	16	2	25	19	6	3.0	0	0	0	0	0	0	0	0
		96	10	143	117	26	23.0	4	96	0	53	4	5	6	1

=== Playoffs ===
Year	Team	Games		Tackles				Interceptions				Fumbles			
Year	Team	GP	GS	Comb	Solo	Ast	Sck	Int	Yds	TD	Lng	FF	FR	Yds	TD
2003	CAR	4	0	**9**	**4**	**5**	**1.5**	0	0	0	0	0	0	0	0
2005	CAR	3	0	2	1	1	0.0	0	0	0	0	0	0	0	0
		7	0	11	5	6	1.5	0	0	0	0	0	0	0	0
