= Spanish River Community High School =

Public high school in Boca Raton, Florida, United States

Location
- 5100 Jog Road; Boca Raton, Florida 33496; United States; 26°23′46″N 80°08′39″W

Information
- Type: Public, high school
- Established: 1983; 43 years ago
- School district: School District of Palm Beach County
- NCES School ID: 120150002383
- Principal: Allison Castellano
- Teaching staff: 127.50 (FTE) (2022–23)
- Grades: 9–12
- Gender: Co-education
- Enrollment: 2,720
- Student to teacher ratio: 20.22 (2022–23)
- Campus: Suburban
- Colors: Blue; White; Silver
- Athletics conference: FHSAA
- Mascot: Shark
- Nickname: Sharks
- Rivals: Boca High Bobcats, Olympic Heights Lions
- Accreditation: SACS (AdvancED)
- Newspaper: The Galleon
- Yearbook: The Tiburon
- Affiliations: NASSP, CB
- Website: www.spanishriverhs.org

Spanish River Community High School is a public high school in Boca Raton, Florida, United States. It is part of the School District of Palm Beach County and serves the cities of Boca Raton and Delray Beach.

== History ==
Spanish River Community High School opened in the fall of 1983, graduating its first senior class in 1985. It was founded with the objective of relieving the crowding at Boca Raton Community High School and to anticipate the future growth in the population of suburban Boca Raton.

It began operations under the direction of principal Dr. William Pinder (1982-1986), who was appointed in 1982 to oversee the staffing and opening of the school.

Although the campus was initially isolated and surrounded by farms, it quickly filled beyond capacity as the neighboring area rapidly developed. Additional classroom space was constructed in 1985 and again in 1988. In 2008, the campus expanded again, as the district completed construction on the Countess de Hoernle Auditorium.

== Academics ==
Spanish River Community High School offers various Advanced Placement (AP) and AICE courses. It also has four specialized academies: American History & Law, Biotechnology, Entrepreneurship and Early Childhood.

It was rated an "A" school by the Florida Department of Education in 2002, 2004, 2005, and 2006. The school earned the rate of "A" based on student performance on the Florida Standards Assessments (FSA) in 2018 and 2019.

== Programs ==
The school has four specialized academies: American History and Law, Biotechnology, Early Childhood, and Entrepreneurship.

In 2005, Spanish River was selected by the Gilder Lehrman Institute of American History to host the Institute's first high school history program in the Southeastern United States. With this support, the school implemented a four-year American history course and a companion legal studies program.

The program also includes a unique Saturday Academy for middle and high school students, that features in-depth courses in American history, which give students and teachers the time and flexibility to study topics that may otherwise not be fully addressed during school hours.

In 2006, the Spanish River Biotech Academy was created in order to attract new students to the school. Initially, classes were held in science classrooms. In the fall of 2008, the school inaugurated a high tech wing specifically for this academy.

== Athletics ==
Spanish River Community High School's mascot is the Shark. The school supports over 19 sports, including: Football, Basketball, Soccer, Baseball, Softball, Cross-Country, Swimming, Diving, Water Polo, Tennis, Track & Field, Lacrosse, Volleyball, Golf, Wrestling, Weightlifting, Bowling, Cheerleading and Flag Football.

=== State titles ===
The athletic teams have won a number of state titles and championships in:

- Girls' cross country (1995, 1996, 1999, 2000, 2001, 2002, 2003)
- Boys' soccer (1997)
- Girls' soccer (1996, 1997, 1999)
- Boys' tennis (1989, 2011)
- Girls' tennis (1987, 1988, 1989, 2006)
- Boys' swimming (1987, 1989, 1990, 1991)
- Girls' swimming (1986, 1987)
- Boys' volleyball (2006, 2007)
- Girls' volleyball (1989, 1991, 1996, 2003)

== Notable alumni ==
- Neil Barofsky, 1988 (attorney and author)
- Jonathan Chase, 1997 (actor)
- Jason Chery, 2004 (professional football player)
- Lance Frazier, 1998 (professional football player)
- Jason Geathers, 1999 (professional football player)
- Scott Gordon, 2006 (professional soccer player)
- Remy Hamilton, 1992 (professional football player)
- Susan Johnson, 1986 (Olympic swimmer)
- Jason Kilar, 1989 (corporate executive)
- Allison Lefcort, 1993 (pop art painter)
- Brett Loewenstern, 2012 (musician)
- Kelly Meggs, leader of the Florida Chapter of the Oath Keepers militia, convicted felon
- Phoebe Mills, 1991 (Olympic gymnast & competitive diver)
- Sean Mullin, 1993 (film director, screenwriter)
- Bill Muter, 2003 (musician)
- Eric Namesnik, 1988 (Olympic swimmer)
- Danielle Schneider, 1993 (comedian, actress, writer)
- Keith Sonderling, 2001 (government official)
- Mike Schroepfer, 1993 (corporate executive)
- Ryan Shore, 1992 (composer and songwriter)
- Marc Singer, 1992 (documentary filmmaker)
- Carlos Guillermo Smith, 1999 (politician)
- Lukasz Tracz, 2004 (business entrepreneur)
- Logan Ury, 2006 (psychologist and author)
- Danny Valencia, 2002 (professional baseball player)
- LaDaris Vann, 1998 (professional football player)
- Tarita Virtue, 1988 (model)
- Al Wallace, 1992 (professional football player)
- Frank Watkins, 1986 (musician)
- Gabrielle Zevin, 1996 (author)

== Holocaust denial controversy ==
The Boca Raton area has a large Jewish population, and the school offers optional courses on the Holocaust. The school became embroiled in controversy and national news media coverage in 2019, when remarks of its then-principal in 2018 led to allegations of Holocaust denial.

In response, he was removed from his position as principal, and the School District of Palm Beach County named Allison Castellano the school's principal on July 25, 2019. Castellano is an alumna of the high school.

== School rating ==
Each year the school is rated by the students' performance on the Florida Comprehensive Assessment Test (FCAT).

Year	School Grade
1999	C
2000	C
2001	B
2002	A
2003	B
2004	A
2005	A
2006	A
2007	A
2008	A
2009	A
2010	A
2011	B
2012	A
2013	A
2014	A
2015	A
2016	A
2017	A
2018	A
2019	N/A
2020	N/A
2021	A
