= Robin Holloway =

English composer and academic (born 1943)

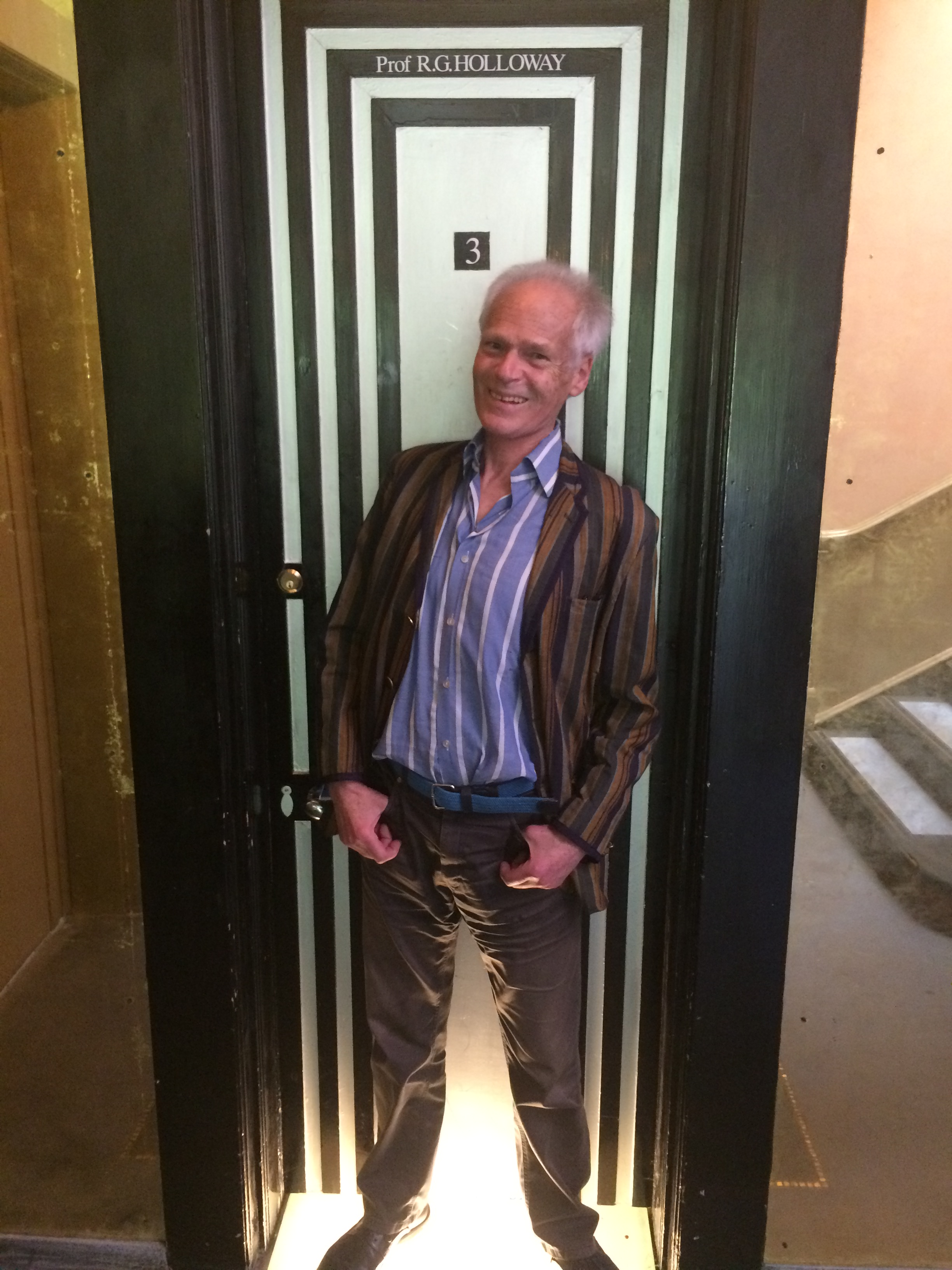
Robin Holloway in front of his Cambridge studio front door (2016)

Robin Greville Holloway (born 19 October 1943) is an English composer, academic and writer.

== Early life ==
Holloway was born in Leamington Spa. From 1953 to 1957, he was a chorister at St Paul's Cathedral and was educated at King's College School, where his father Robert was Head of the Art Department. He attended King's College, Cambridge, and studied composition with Bayan Northcott.

== Career ==
In 1974, Holloway became an Assistant Lecturer in Music in the University of Cambridge and in 1980 attained a full Lecturer position. In 1999, he became a reader in Musical Composition at Cambridge. He retired in 2011 as professor of Musical Composition. He is a Fellow of Gonville and Caius College, Cambridge. Among his many pupils were Thomas Adès, Huw Watkins, Peter Seabourne, George Benjamin, Judith Weir and Jonathan Dove.

Holloway's doctoral thesis, Debussy and Wagner (later published as a book by Eulenburg), discussed a close relationship between music and language as well as romanticism and tonality. This can be heard in his own works, such as Scenes from Schumann (1969–70), the opera Clarissa (1976) premiered in 1990 at English National Opera under the baton of Oliver Knussen, and Seascape and Harvest (1983–84) composed for the City of Birmingham Symphony Orchestra and Sir Simon Rattle.

Holloway contributed a regular music column to The Spectator magazine between 1988 and 2010. Two collections of his journalistic and other occasional writings have been compiled and published, as On Music: Essays and Diversions 1963–2003 (Continuum Press, 2003 hdbk/2005 pbk, ISBN 0-8264-7629-5) and Essays & Diversions II (Continuum Press, 2008; ISBN 0-8264-9728-4).

Holloway has been described as a "neo-romantic" composer, reflecting his own affinity for music of the last part of the 19th and early part of the 20th centuries.

While some of his works conform to this description, others evince a more complex, nuanced and at times ironic relationship to music of the past, verging on the post-modern. According to fellow composer David Matthews, his "individual style has been formed by a productive conflict between Romanticism and Modernism."

Holloway's Fifth Concerto for Orchestra was premiered at The Proms in 2011.

In 1994, his Second Concerto for Orchestra, released by NMC, won a Gramophone Award. Since 2018 the English CD label Sheva Contemporary, run by the composer's pupil and friend Peter Seabourne, has issued three discs of the composer's chamber music.

== Compositions ==
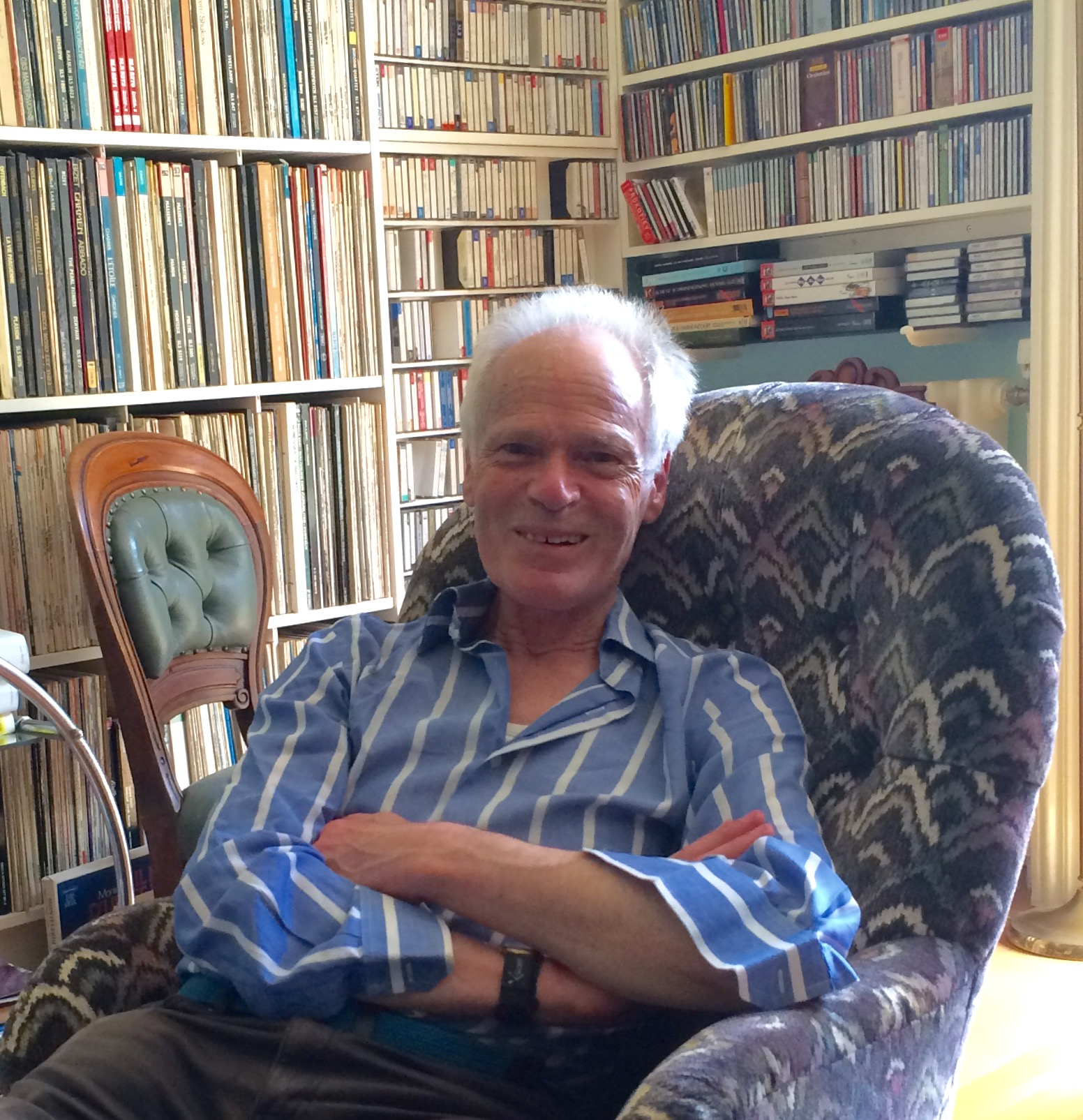
Robin Holloway in his Cambridge studio (2016). Photo by Michael Daugherty

- 1962: Opus 1, Garden Music for 9 players
- 1964: Opus 2, Concertino No. 1 for small orchestra
- 1964–65: Opus 3, Three Poems of William Empson for mezzo-soprano and ensemble
- 1965: Opus 4, Music for Eliot's 'Sweeney Agonistes' for 6 players and speakers
- 1965–66: Opus 5, In Chymick Art, cantata for soprano, baritone and 9 players (text of Edward Benlowes), Opus 6, Concerto for organ and wind, Opus 7, Four Housman Fragments for soprano and piano
- 1966–69: Opus 8, First Concerto for Orchestra
- 1967: Opus 9, Melodrama for speaker, small male chorus, and ensemble (text of Sylvia Plath), Opus 10, Concertino No. 2 for small orchestra
- 1968: Opus 11, Divertimento No. 1 for amateur orchestra and piano
- 1968–69: Opus 12, Tender Only to One for soprano solo (text of Stevie Smith)
- 1970: Opus 13, Scenes from Schumann for orchestra, Opus 14, The Wind Shifts for high voice and strings (text of Wallace Stevens)
- 1971: Opus 15, Banal Sojourn for high voice and piano (text of Wallace Stevens), Opus 16: Fantasy-Pieces for piano and 12 instruments
- 1972: Opus 17, Evening with Angels for 16 players, Opus 18, Divertimento No. 2 for wind nonet, Opus 19, Georgian Songs for baritone and piano
- 1972–73: Opus 20, Cantata on the Death of God for soloists, speaker, SATB chorus, organ and orchestra, Opus 21, Five Little Songs about Death for mezzo-soprano or contralto solo (text of Stevie Smith)
- 1973: Opus 22, Five Madrigals for unaccompanied chorus
- 1973–74: Opus 23, Domination of Black for large orchestra, Opus 23a, Diptych, Opus 23b, Summer Rain, Opus 23c, Night Hunt
- 1974: Opus 24, Lights Out for baritone and piano (text of Edward Thomas), Opus 25, In the Thirtieth Year for tenor and piano (text of J.V. Cunningham), Opus 26, Author of Light for contralto and piano (Jacobean texts), Opus 27, The Leaves Cry for soprano and piano (texts of Wallace Stevens and Christina Rossetti)
- 1974–75: Opus 28, Sea-Surface Full of Clouds, cantata for soloists, choir, and chamber orchestra
- 1975: Opus 29, Homage to Weill: Concertino No. 3 for 11 players
- 1976: Opus 30, Clarissa, Opera in two acts, Opus 30a, Clarissa Symphony for soprano, tenor and orchestra, Opus 30b, Clarissa Sequence for soprano and orchestra (1995), Opus 31, Romanza for violin and small orchestra
- 1977: Opus 32, This is Just to Say for tenor and piano, Opus 33, Nursery Rhymes for soprano and wind quintet, Opus 33a, Nursery Rhymes: Divertimento No. 3 for soprano and wind quintet, Opus 33b, Conundrums: Divertimento No. 4 for soprano and wind quintet (*1979), Opus 33c, A Medley of Nursery Rhymes and Conundrums for mezzo-soprano and piano (1986), Opus 34, The Rivers of Hell for 7 players, Opus 35/1, The Blue Doom of Summer for high voice and harp (text of Ronald Firbank), Opus 35/2, Willow Cycle for tenor and harp (Elizabethan texts), Opus 36, Hymn for Voices for unaccompanied chorus, Opus 37, From High Windows for baritone and piano (text of Philip Larkin), Opus 38/1, The Consolation of Music for unaccompanied chorus
- 1978: Opus 38/2, He-She-Together for unaccompanied chorus (text of James Joyce), Killing Time for soprano solo (Auden/Stevie Smith/Raleigh)
- 1978–79: Opus 39, The Noon's Repose for tenor and harp (Eliot/Stevens/Marvell), Opus 40, Second Concerto for Orchestra, Opus 41, Serenade in C for octet
- 1979–80: Opus 42, First Idyll for small orchestra, Opus 43, Horn Concerto, Opus 44, Aria for 14 players
- 1980: Opus 45, Ode for 4 winds and strings
- 1980–81: Opus 46, Wherever We May Be for soprano and piano (Robert Graves)
- 1981: Opus 47, Sonata for Violin Solo, Opus 48, Brand, dramatic ballad for soloists, chorus, organ, and orchestra, Opus 49, The Lover's Well for baritone and piano (text of Geoffrey Hill)
- 1981–82: Opus 50, War Memorials for brass band
- 1982: Opus 51, Women in War, revue for 4 female soloists and piano, Suite for Saxophone, Opus 52, Serenata Notturna for 4 horns and small orchestra
- 1982–83: Opus 53, Showpiece: Concertino No. 4 for 14 players, Opus 54, Second Idyll for small orchestra
- 1983–84: Opus 55, Seascape and Harvest for orchestra, Opus 56, Viola Concerto for viola and small orchestra
- 1983: Opus 57, Serenade in Eb for wind quintet and string quintet
- 1984: Opus 58, Moments of Vision cycle for speaker and 4 players, Opus 59, Romanza for oboe and string orchestra, On Hope cantata for soprano and mezzo-soprano soloists, and string quartet (ms), Opus 60a, Souvenirs de Monsalvat for piano four-hands, Since I believe, Anthem for a cappella choir (text of Robert Bridges)
- 1984–85: Opus 61, Ballad for harp and small orchestra, Opus 63, Bassoon Concerto for bassoon and small orchestra
- 1985: Opus 62/1, First Partita for solo horn, Opus 62/2, Second Partita for solo horn, Concertino No. 4 ½ Signature for "BBC Young Musician of the Year" for ensemble (ms)
- 1986: Opus 64, Serenade in G for string septet, Opus 64a, Serenade in G for string orchestra, Opus 64b, Serenade in G for string sextet, Opus 65, Organ Fantasy, Opus 66, Inquietus for small orchestra
- 1987: Opus 67, Brass Quintet: Divertimento No. 5
- 1988: Opus 68, Double Concerto for clarinet, saxophone and two chamber orchestras, Panorama for orchestra
- 1989: Opus 60, Wagner Nights, Waltz-sequence for orchestra
- 1990: Opus 69, The Spacious Firmament for chorus and orchestra (Dryden/Blake/Tennyson), Opus 70, Violin Concerto, Opus 71, Entrance: Carousing: Embarkation for symphonic band, Opus 72, Hymn to the Senses for large chorus (text of John Fuller), Opus 73, Serenade for Strings in E
- 1991: Opus 74, Summer Music: Concertino No. 5 for mixed sextet
- 1991–95: Opus 75, Boys and Girls Come Out to Play, Opera Buffa in two acts, Opus 75a, Overture on Nursery Rhymes for chamber orchestra
- 1991: Opus 77, Lord, what is man? for unaccompanied chorus (text of Crashaw)
- 1992: Love will find out the way, for soprano and chamber ensemble
- 1993: Opus 76, Winter Music for six players, Opus 78, Third Idyll: Frost at Midnight for chamber orchestra, A Singing Telegram for Amelia Freedman for string sextet with optional double bass, Berceuse with Burlesque for piano quartet (ms), Bourrée fantasque, completion of Chabrier's own unfinished orchestration of his solo piano original
- 1993–94: Opus 79, Trio for clarinet, viola and piano
- 1981–94: Opus 80, Third Concerto for Orchestra
- 1994: Opus 81, The Blackbird and the Snail for narrator and piano (text of Walter de la Mare)
- 1996: Opus 82, Clarinet Concerto
- 1996–97: Opus 83, Double-bass Concerto
- c.1984–97: Opus 84, Peer Gynt
- 1997: Opus 85, Scenes from Antwerp for orchestra
- 1992–97: Opus 86, Gilded Goldbergs for two pianos
- 1998: Cortège Burlesque, orchestration of Chabrier's piano duet
- 1998–99: Opus 88, Symphony
- 1999: 8 Haydn Miniatures, Opus 83a, Sonata for Solo Double Bass, Opus 87, Sonata for Viola Solo, Opus 89: i. Woefully arrayed, motet for choir and organ (anon/?Skelton), ii. Felicity motet for choir and organ (Traherne)
- 2000: Opus 90, no. i, Ballade for piano, no. ii, Nocturne for piano (series is 'to be continued')
- 2001: Opus 91, Sonata for Solo Cello Opus 92, Serenade in Bb for wind octet
- 1993–2001: Opus 93, Missa Caiensis for choir and organ (Kyrie; Sanctus and Benedictus; Agnus, written *1993: Gloria; Credo, written 2001)
- 2002: Orchestration of Debussy's En blanc et noir, Opus 94: Various pieces for solo trumpet, 2 trumpets, trumpet and organ, Opus 95: Christmas Sequence for choir and organ, Opus 96: Spring Music for 6 players, Opus 97: String Quartet no. 1, Opus 98: Four-Piece Suite for organ
- 2004: Opus 99, Serenade in D flat for 4 players, Opus 100, String Quartet No. 2
- 2005: Magnificat & Nunc Dimittis (Winchester Service) for choir and organ,
- 2004–2006: Opus 101, Fourth Concerto for Orchestra (world première in February 2007 with the San Francisco Symphony and Michael Tilson Thomas)
- 2006: A Page from a Humument, for soprano and ensemble; Opus 102: Fourth Idyll
- 2006–2007: Opus 103/1-6, Six Quartettini, plus Opus 103/7, Sonatina for Solo Violin
- 2007: Opus 104: Three Psalms (Psalms 39, 121 & 113) for choir and organ, What Can It Be?, a round of riddles for 6-part vocal consort, Suite for Harp, Suite en Saga for solo viola, Five Temperaments for wind quintet
- 2007–2008: 3 Songs for Contralto and Piano (texts of Edmund Waller)
- 2009: Opus 107: Fifth Concerto for Orchestra, Opus 108: Partita for solo piano
- 2009–2010: Opus 109: Reliquary – Scenes from the life of Mary Queen of Scots enclosing an instrumentation of Robert Schumann's 'Gedichte der Königin Maria Stuart', Op. 135 for mezzo-soprano and orchestra
- 2010: Andante and Variations (transcription of Schumann, Andante and Variations in B flat Op. 46)
- 2012: Opus 117, In China for orchestra
- 2014: Opus 121, Europa and the Bull for Tuba and Orchestra North American premiere by Jeffrey Anderson with the San Francisco Symphony and Michael Tilson Thomas.
- 2019: Opus 133, Concerto for Cello and Orchestra
