= Bill Muter =

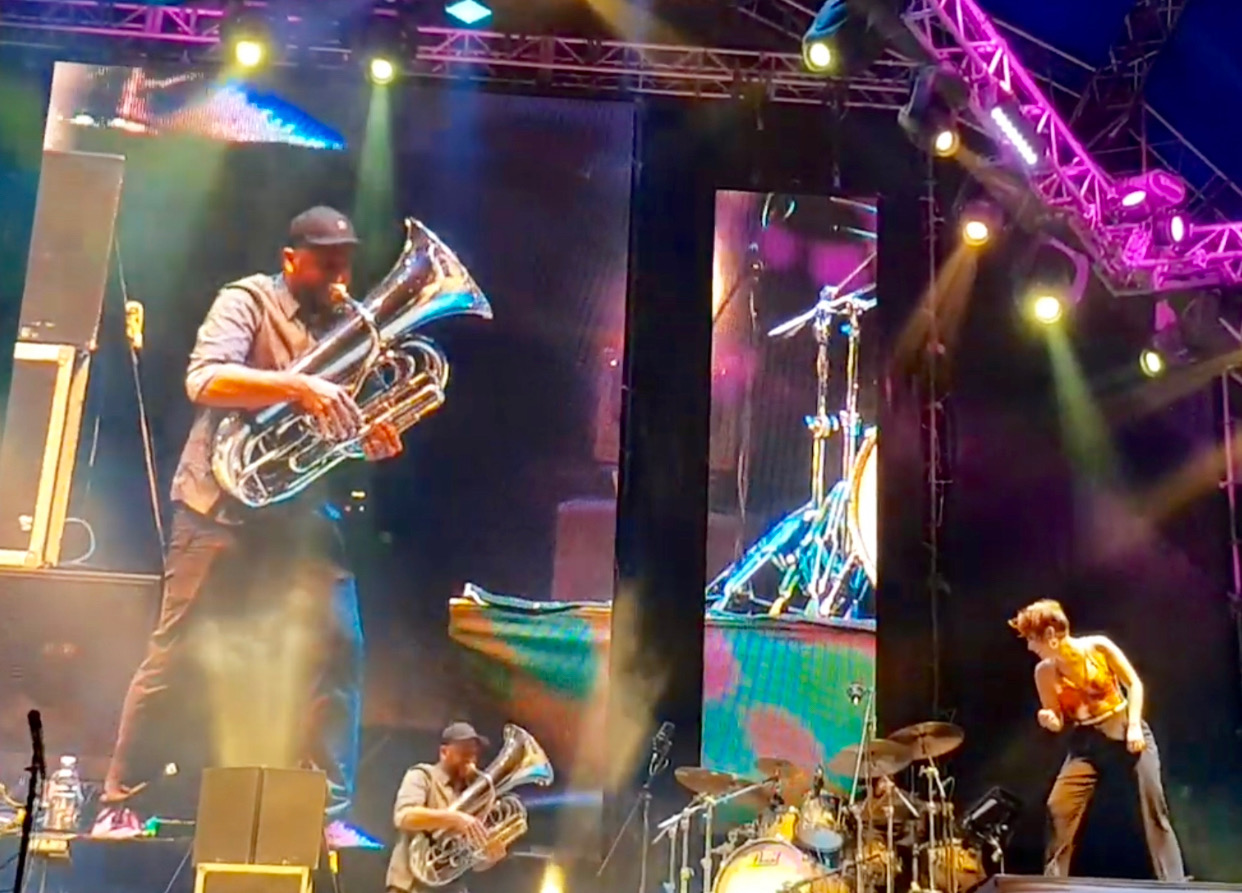
- Bill Muter performing at the Riviera Maya Jazz Festival in 2018

Background information
- Also known as: Tubavisionary
- Born: June 8, 1984 (age 41)
- Genres: Hip hop, jazz, neo soul
- Occupation: Musician/music educator
- Instruments: Tuba, bass guitar
- Labels: Atlantic Arts and Entertainment

Bill Muter (born June 8, 1984), also known as Tubavisionary, is an American tuba player, educator and author from South Florida. Muter is known by BuzzFeed as the "tuba player that can beatbox to any hip hop song", and also for his music technique book titled A Practical Approach: Brass Pedagogy Book.

In the month of its release, A Practical Approach was a bestselling book on Apple's iBookstore Music Book Charts, topping The Beatles Songbook and the popular Real Book. A Practical Approach was also translated into Japanese and has been sold in all 47 Japanese prefectures in association with Blast!, Kyodo Tokyo and BrassTribe Magazine. Muter's English paperback version is currently available through Barnes & Noble and Amazon (company). Along with A Practical Approach, Muter is also a contributing author of pedagogy materials to the International Tuba-Euphonium Association.

He attended Spanish River Community High School, where he played music in the marching band. Later in life as an educator, Muter is a cultural ambassador for the United States Department of State Bureau of Educational and Cultural Affairs in the Jazz Ambassadors program. This is the same initiate pioneered by Dizzy Gillespie, Louis Armstrong, Benny Goodman and Duke Ellington in the 1950s. In this program, Muter toured as the tuba player and music director for Drew Tucker and the New Standard in partnership with the US embassies in Mérida, Mexico City and San Jose. Muter has also worked with numerous universities across the United States and Japan and was also the curriculum advisor for Honeyland College in Lagos, Nigeria. Muter's teachings have also gained notoriety in Brass Musician Magazine and The New Times.

As a performer, Muter has played and recorded with rapper Eric Biddines and was on his "The Local Cafe" album, which was featured on Okayplayer, XXL (magazine) and HipHopDX. The "Coffee Love" music video, a collaboration with the SuicideGirls was also featured on BET Jams. Muter has also worked with French Multi Platinum selling artist Mani Hoffman. Their music video "Change My World," produced by BalconyTV – The Orchard (company) featured Muter on tuba and peaked at #4 in the world. Muter has also worked with many other notable artists including Grammy Winner's Shaun Martin, Robert 'Sput' Searight, Larnell Lewis and Mark Lettieri of Snarky Puppy as well as Snarky Puppy's horn section. Muter has also played with James Francies (keyboardist with The Roots), tap dancer Sarah Reich from Postmodern Jukebox and Prince's last bassist MonoNeon (Dywane Thomas Jr.).

Muter's solo album "Off Script" produced by Mike Mineo quickly gained attention by the press and The New Times quoted that Muter "has the potential to do for the tuba what Louis Armstrong did to the trumpet." "Off Script" was also nominated for the Roger Bobo Excellence in Recording Award by the International Tuba Euphonium Association. Muter's most recent work Topless in Tokyo was released in 2019 as both a paperback novel and a music album. Topless in Tokyo was featured in Last Row magazine as well as Voyage Magazine, which named Muter one of Boca Raton's rising stars. Topless in Tokyo charted in the top 30 for the Global R&B Charts on Amazon Music, topping artists such as Al Green and more. This is a first for any solo instrumental tuba album.

== Bibliography ==
Year	Book Title	Author(s)/Credits	Release Details
2019	Topless in Tokyo	Bill Muter	English Paperback ISBN 978-0-359-41098-9
2016	The Modern Musician	Ryan King, Bill Muter (editor)	English Paperback ISBN 978-1-329-96352-8
2016	Team Bandit Wind Technique Book	Bill Muter	English Paperback ISBN 978-1-312-10805-9
2012	A Practical Approach: Brass Pedagogy Book	Bill Muter	English Paperback ISBN 978-1-105-71790-1
2012	実践的アプローチ	Bill Muter, translated by Satoko Nourishirazi	Japanese Paperback ISBN 978-1-105-85377-7

== Discography ==
Year	Song / Album	Artist(s)	Release Details
2019	Topless in Tokyo (album)	Bill Muter	Released on Atlantic Arts and Entertainment, produced by Bill Muter
2017	"Coffee Love" Album: The Local Cafe	Eric Biddines feat. Bill Muter	Album release with music video featuring the SuicideGirls
2017	Bourbon and Mixtapes (album)	Drew Tucker and The New Standard feat. Bill Muter	Album release
2016	Poison (single)	Bill Muter	Released on Atlantic Arts and Entertainment, produced by Bill Muter
2015	Change My World (single)	Mani Hoffman feat. Bill Muter	Music Video released on BalconyTV The Orchard (company)
2013	Off Script (album)	Bill Muter	Released on Atlantic Arts and Entertainment, produced by Bill Muter
2011	Beach Season (album)	Mike Mineo feat. Bill Muter	Released on Nevernothing Records, Bill Muter on Tuba and Bass
2010	Where Did You Go Eccentricity (album)	Mike Mineo feat. Bill Muter	Released on Nevernothing Records, Bill Muter on Tuba
2010	Odd Ball Freak Tour (album)	Mike Mineo feat. Bill Muter	Released on Nevernothing Records, Bill Muter on Tuba
