= David Fedderly =

American musician (born 1953)

David Fedderly (born 1953) is an American orchestral tuba player and teacher.

== Life and career ==
As a fifth-grader in Silver Bay, Minnesota Fedderly's first choice of instrument was drums, but there were too many drummers already. Trumpet and trombone (his second and third choices) weren't available either, so he was offered a sousaphone instead. He earned the money for his first tuba by cleaning out bear cages at the Split Rock Trading Post, and went on to study at Northwestern University with the Chicago Symphony Orchestra's Arnold Jacobs.

Fedderly has been the principal tubist for the Baltimore Symphony Orchestra since 1983 and has performed as substitute principal tuba for the Chicago Symphony Orchestra, the Philadelphia Orchestra, Boston Symphony Orchestra, Milwaukee Symphony Orchestra, and the St. Louis Symphony Orchestra.

Fedderly is a notable teacher of tuba, euphonium, and general respiratory techniques for playing brass instruments. He lectured at the Peabody Institute of the Johns Hopkins University until 2000 and rejoined the faculty in 2009. He has been on the faculty of The Juilliard School since 2002 and has also held teaching positions at DePaul University, University of Maryland, College Park, and The Catholic University of America.

He is a member of the board of directors of the International Tuba Euphonium Association, where he served as treasurer from 2008 to 2010, and is the proprietor of the Baltimore Brass Company, a large brass sales and repair shop in Catonsville, just west of Baltimore.
