= Samuel Pilafian =

American musical artist (1949–2019)

- Born: James Samuel Pilafian; October 29, 1949; Miami, Florida, U.S.
- Died: April 5, 2019 (aged 69); Tempe, Arizona, U.S.
- Education: University of Miami (B.M., 1972)
- Occupation: Musician
- Spouse: Diann Jezurski (m. 1981)
- Children: 2
- Musical career
- Genres: Classical; film score; rock and roll; jazz; pop
- Instrument: Tuba
- Years active: 1970–2019
- Formerly of: Empire Brass

James Samuel Pilafian (October 25, 1949 – April 5, 2019) was an American tuba player and educator.

== Biography ==
Pilafian participated in the National Music Camp in Interlochen, MI and was the second tuba player to win the concerto competition. Via his performance at Interlochen, he was awarded scholarships to study at both Dartmouth College and the Tanglewood Music Center. Leonard Bernstein chose Pilafian, Charles Lewis, and Rolf Smedvig to perform in the world premier of Bernstein's Mass at the opening of the John F. Kennedy Center for the Performing Arts. He earned his bachelor's degree in music at the University of Miami in 1972.

Since then, Pilafian performed numerous times in international concerts and recordings. He founded the Empire Brass with Charles Lewis and Rolf Smedvig and performed in the Broadway Musicals Doctor Jazz and Much Ado About Nothing. He also co-owned and toured full time with the Boston Brass from 2013–2019 with whom he released three albums.

Pilafian was also active in the jazz scene, having played with the Duke Ellington Orchestra and, since 1991, in the duo Travelin' Light with guitarist Frank Vignola. With the saxophonist Scott Zimmer, Pilafian also played the music of Maurice Ravel, Béla Bartók, Thelonious Monk, Ornette Coleman, and Captain Beefheart. Pilafian also participated in a Pink Floyd recording.

In 1985 Pilafian was on the Mr. Rogers' Neighborhood television show Episode 1549, where he demonstrated the tuba and Fred Rogers attempted to buzz a note. Dave Ohanian, Rolf Smedvig, Charles Lewis Jr., and Scott Hartman, all members of the Empire Brass at the time, also make appearances in this episode.

In the early 2000's, Pilafian teamed up with Patrick Sheridan to develop and publish The Breathing Gym, a book/DVD resource that teaches stretching and breathing exercises to promote free breathing and efficient use of air. The Breathing Gym method is deeply rooted in Pilafian and Sheridan's experience with Arnold Jacobs.

Pilafian started teaching at Arizona State University in 1994 and later at University of Miami in 2012 and North Dakota State University in 2017. Among his notable students is Marcus Rojas.

Pilafian died on April 5, 2019, from complications related to colon cancer.

== Discography ==
- Travelling Light, Telarc, 1991
- Making Whoopee, 1993
- Meltdown, 1998
- Perception, 1998 mit Eugene Anderson, Timothy Russell, Timothy Morrison und dem Arizona State University Symphony Orchestra
- Rewired, 2015, Boston Brass
- Reminiscing, 2016, Boston Brass
- Simple Gifts, 2018. Boston Brass
