= Tony Clements =

American musician (born 1954)

Tony Clements (born 1954) is an American musician who was the Principal Tubist of the San Jose Symphony from 1981 until its closure in 2001. He subsequently became Principal Tubist and a soloist with its successor, Symphony Silicon Valley.

Clements grew up in Brooklyn and Lindenhurst, New York state, and began playing the tuba at age seven. He was taught by Julius Rubin and Bill Barber, before moving to California aged fourteen. He attended college at California State University, Northridge, where he played tuba, bass trombone, euphonium and bass trumpet. There, he studied with Tommy Johnson and Roger Bobo before receiving symphony training with Mehli Mehta in the American Youth Symphony and Myung-Whun Chung in the Young Musicians' Foundation Debut Orchestra.

After joining the San Jose Symphony in 1981, he was the Principal Tubist for 21 seasons, during which he premiered a number of pieces for tuba and euphonium, as well as playing at music festivals and touring Japan with the California Polytechnic State University San Luis Obispo Wind Ensemble as guest soloist. He has also played with the San Francisco Symphony, San Diego Symphony, Oakland Symphony, Sacramento Symphony, San Francisco Ballet Orchestra and San Francisco Opera Orchestra.

Clements is the conductor of Ohlone College's Wind Orchestra. In 2006, he was named Director of Bands at California State University, East Bay. Currently, he conducts the Ohlone Wind Orchestra, the Mission Peak Brass Band, the Ohlone Community Band and the 12-year-old Ohlone Tuba Ensemble. He is also Instructor of Tuba, Euphonium, and Brass Ensemble at Stanford University.
