= Aubrey Foard =

American tubist

Aubrey Foard is an American tubist.

== Professional career ==
Foard has been the Principal Tubist of the Baltimore Symphony Orchestra since September 2018. He is also a Lecturer of Tuba and Euphonium at UCLA, where he has taught since 2013. Prior to that, he was the tuba instructor at West Virginia State University from 2011 to 2013. During the summer seasons, he teaches and performs as an Artist Faculty at the Brevard Music Center. From 2012 to 2018, he was the principal tubist of the Charlotte Symphony Orchestra. He previously held positions as Principal Tubist with the Britt Festival Orchestra, the West Virginia Symphony Orchestra, the Santa Barbara Symphony Orchestra, and the Albany Symphony Orchestra.

Foard has been heard twice on NPR's Performance Today: once as a soloist performing Ralph Vaughan Williams' Concerto for Bass Tuba and again performing William Bolcom's Virtuosity Rag with brass quintet. Foard was a finalist in the Music Academy of the West concerto competition twice. He has also been a prizewinner in the Minnesota Orchestra's Young Artist Competition (2003, 2008). In 2012, Foard performed both Vaughan Williams' and film composer John Williams Tuba Concertos with the West Virginia Symphony. He performed several times as a soloist with the Charlotte Symphony Orchestra, including a world premiere of a tuba concerto by Mark Petering in 2018.

Foard was born in Milwaukee, Wisconsin. He was the first tuba player to graduate from The Colburn School's Conservatory of Music, receiving an Artist Diploma. He also holds a Master of Music Degree from Rice University and a Bachelor of Music Degree from the Cleveland Institute of Music. He has studied with Alan Baer, Ron Bishop, David Kirk, Mark Lawrence, Norman Pearson, and Fritz Kaenzig.
