= Heiko Triebener =

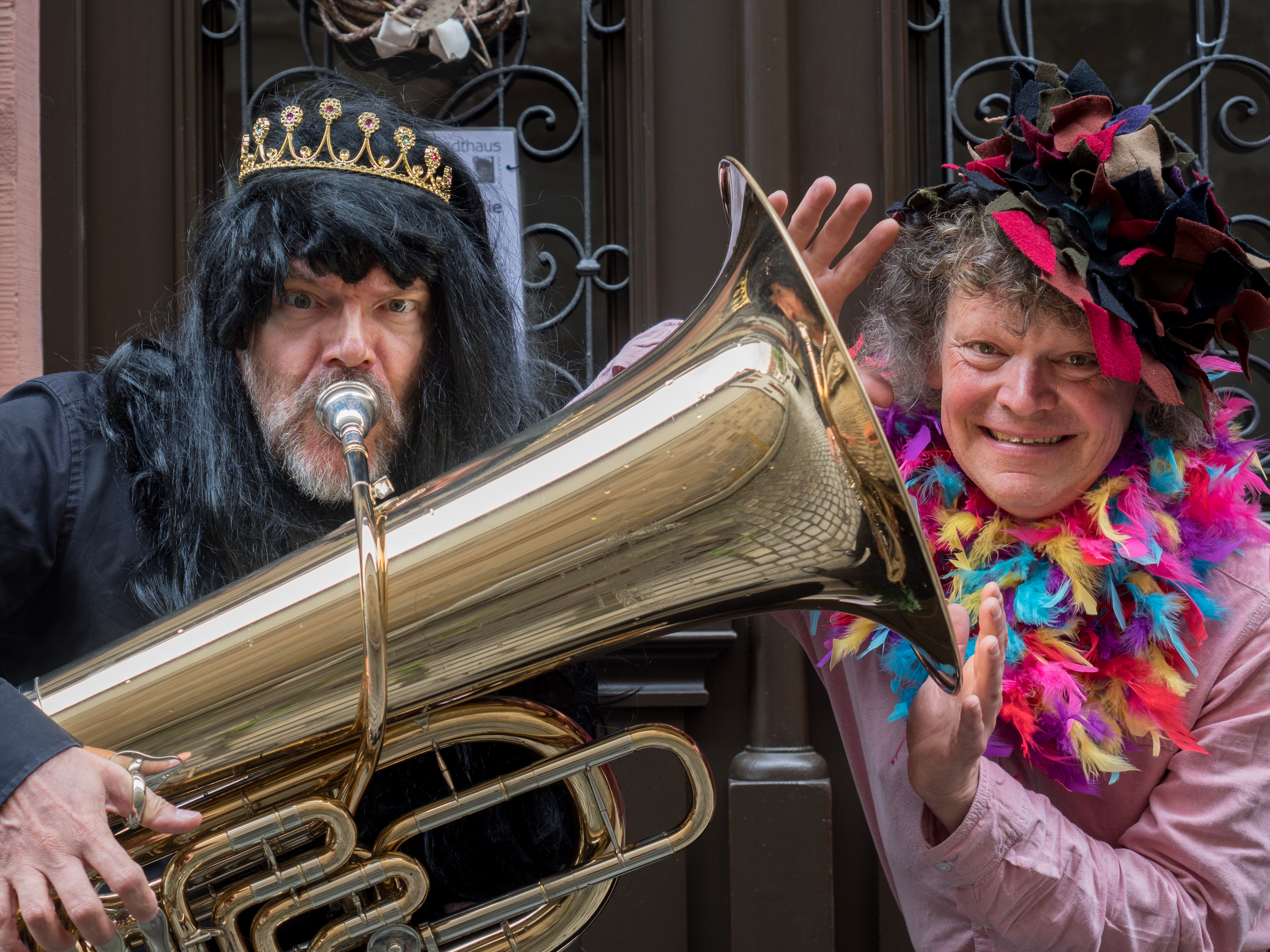
Heiko Triebener

Heiko Triebener (born November 24, 1964, in Berlin) is a German classical tubist.

Musical education:
since 1983 musicology at University of Tübingen
1982-1992 private studies with Robert Tucci, Bavarian State Opera

Competitions:
1981 & 1983 Jugend musiziert solo national competition each with highest award
1982 & 1983 concerto competition winner Interlochen
1984 International competition Markneukirchen highest award
1984 International Brass Conference Bloomington, Indiana: highest award tuba solo competition

Orchestra musician:
1984-85 German Air Force music corps 1 Neubiberg
1984-86 Radio Symphony Orchestra Saarbrücken
1987-93 Principal Tubist Orchestra of Beethovenhalle Bonn
since 1993 Principal Tubist Bamberg Symphony Orchestra – Bayerische Staatsphilharmonie.

He won many competition awards and performed concert tours in Europe and USA.
In 1987 he founded the German Melton Tuba Quartet and is an intermittent member of German Brass.
