= Soai University =

- 相愛大学
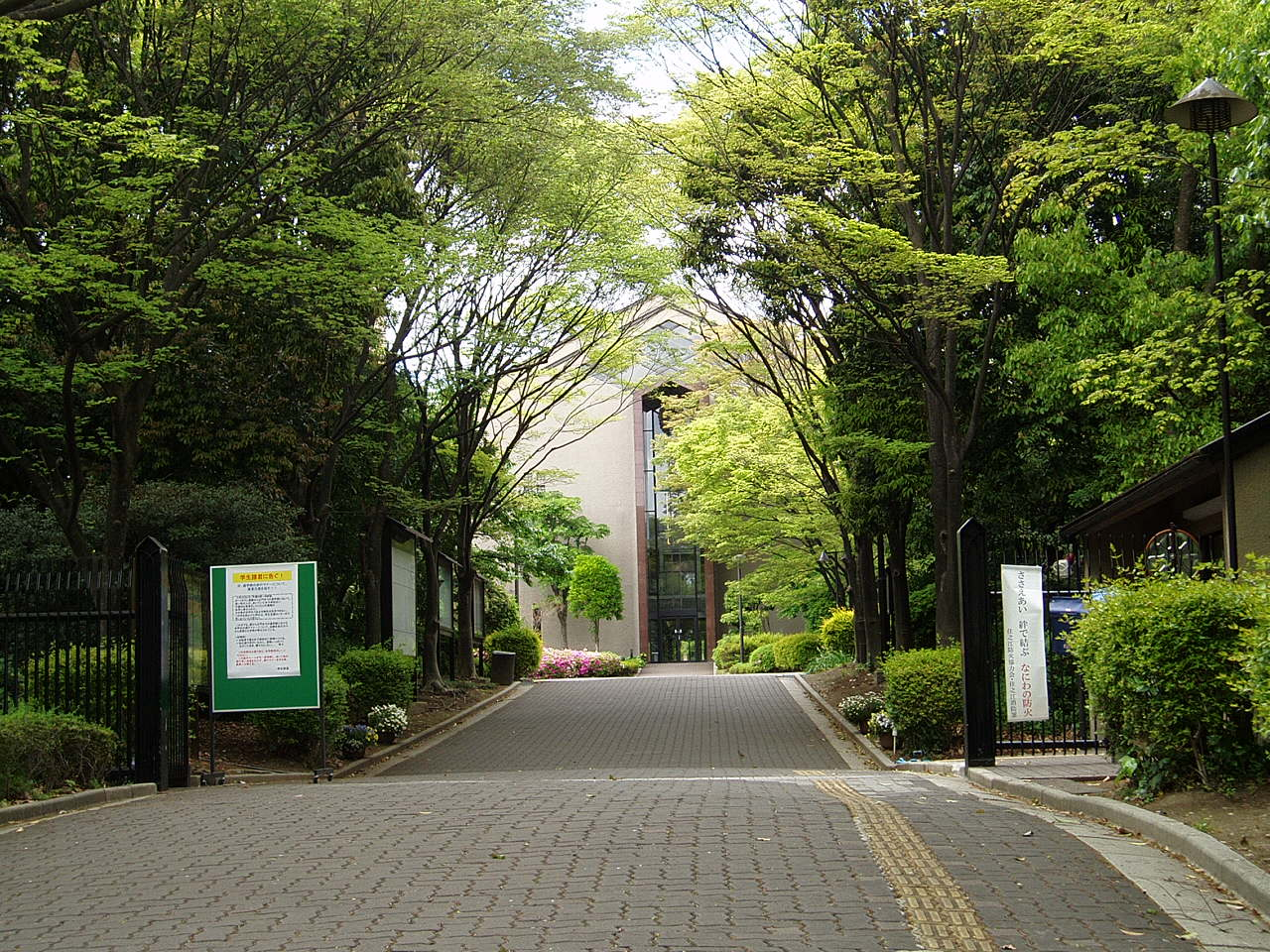
- Main entrance
- Motto: 當相敬愛
- Motto in English: You should love and respect other people just as you do yourself
- Type: Private
- Established: 1888
- Religious affiliation: Jodo Shinshu Hongwanji-ha, Buddhism
- Location: Osaka, Japan; 34°38′4.8″N 135°25′39.8″E
- Campus: Urban
- Website: www.soai.ac.jp
- Location within Osaka Prefecture

Soai University (相愛大学, Sōai Daigaku) is a private university in the city of Osaka, Japan. It was established in 1888, initially as a women's university.

Famous people with ties to Soai include alumni Hideo Ishikawa, Haruko Okamoto, Mihoko Shuku and Yasuhito Sugiyama.

== Faculties ==
This university has three faculties;

Faculty of Music

- Department of Music

Faculty of Humanities

- Department of Humanities

Faculty of Human Development

- Department of Child Development Studies
- Department of Food and Nutrition Management Studies
