= John Fletcher (tubist) =

English tubist (1941–1987)

John Fletcher (19 May 1941 – 7 October 1987) was an English tubist and French Horn player.

== Life and career ==
He was born and educated in Leeds, and was a pupil at Leeds Modern School, a grammar school, where his father was the music teacher. Along with composer Derek Bourgeois he played tuba in the National Youth Orchestra of Great Britain. Both arrived at Cambridge where there was only one tuba position. Fletcher switched to horn, even performing Britten's Serenade for Tenor, Horn and Strings. He returned to the tuba upon his graduation from studying Natural Sciences at Pembroke College, Cambridge.

In autumn 1964, he moved to London, where he was appointed Principal Tuba of the BBC Symphony Orchestra. He left the BBC Symphony Orchestra in 1966 to join the London Symphony Orchestra (LSO). In 1966, he also joined the Philip Jones Brass Ensemble (PJBE), with whom he played until 1986. Known to his friends as "Fletch", he was highly regarded as a tuba player and teacher. He taught many UK professional tubists, including Patrick Harrild, who succeeded Fletcher as the LSO's principal tuba. Fletcher also regularly tutored members of the National Youth Orchestra.

Fletcher's recordings included the Vaughan Williams Tuba Concerto. Leonard Salzedo dedicated his Sonata for tuba and piano, op. 93, to Fletcher.

In 1967, Fletcher married the mezzo-soprano Margaret Cable, and together they had a daughter and a son. In March 1987, he suffered a massive cerebral haemorrhage, and died that October. The John Fletcher Trust Fund was established after his death, in his memory, to provide bursaries for young brass players to attend the courses run by the National Youth Orchestra, National Youth Brass band and other training centres.

Fletcher is discussed in the book 'To Speak for Ourselves' (ed. Alan Smythe), a collection of interviews with leading members of the London Symphony Orchestra.
