= Dietrich Unkrodt =

German tubist

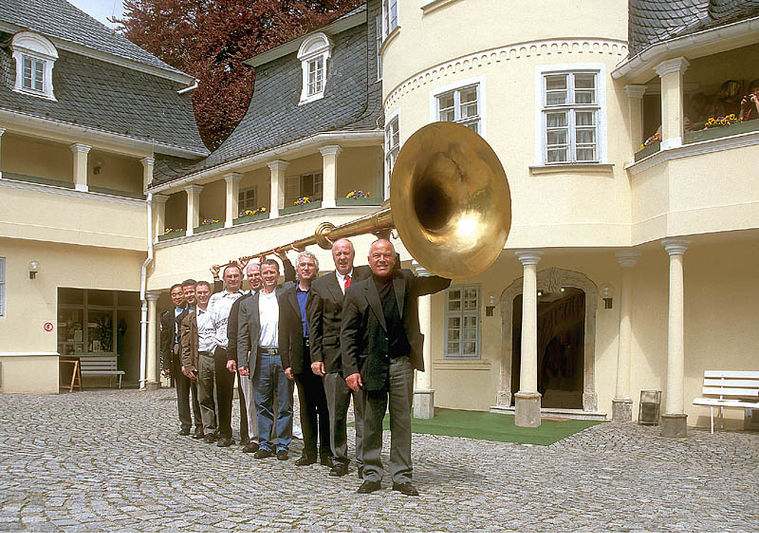
- Unkrodt as jury member 2004 (r.)
- Born: 25 August 1934; Prudnik, Upper Silesia, Germany
- Died: 26 June 2006 (aged 71); Cottbus, Germany
- Occupations: Tubist; Composer; Academic teacher
- Organizations: Komische Oper Berlin; Hannes Zerbe Blechband; Berlin Brass Quintet

Dietrich Unkrodt (25 August 1934 – 26 June 2006) was a German tubist and double bass player, the principal tubist of the Komische Oper Berlin. He was particularly active as a jazz tubist, appearing internationally. Unkrodt was one of the pioneers of solo tuba music in Germany.

== Life ==
Born in Neustadt, Upper Silesia (now Prudnik, Poland), he studied with Richard Iser at the Hochschule für Musik Hanns Eisler in Berlin from 1952 to 1955. He was employed at the Meiningen Theatre from 1956 to 1960, and then moved to the Komische Oper Berlin. He was promoted to principal tuba and served until 2000.

Several major works were composed by fellow musicians in his honor. The Konzert für Tuba und Orchester (Tuba Concerto) by Joachim Gruner, published in 1977 by Verlag Neue Musik, which he premiered in 1978 with the orchestra of the Komische Oper Berlin, conducted by Joachim Willert. It was recorded with the Rundfunk-Sinfonieorchester Berlin, and the recording was released by the Nova Deutche Schallplatten label in 1982. He toured with it from 1979, including in France, Hungary, the US and Japan. Günter Kochan wrote Sieben Miniaturen für Vier Tuben (Seven Miniatures for Four Tubas), recorded by Verlag Neue Musik Berlin in 1978, for Unkrodt, and John D. Stevens wrote Fanfare for a Friend in Unkrodt's honor in 1991. Stevens stated in 2006 that from their first meeting Unkrodt made an impact on him. He further honored Unkrodt by conducting the International Tuba Euphonium Association High School & University All-Star Ensembles playing it at the ITEC Convention that year, shortly after Unkrodt's death.

Together with the pianist and composer Hannes Zerbe, he devoted himself to free jazz. He was a member of the Hannes Zerbe Blechband, and in 1980 formed with Zerbe the duo Zerbe-Unkrodt. He participated in the DDR Jazznacht for free jazz. He and Zerbe also played improvisational chamber music with saxophonist Manfred Schulze. Their trio performed at the Leipzig Jazz Days festival in 1981. The duo Zerbe-Unkrodt also appeared at the Kölner Jazz Haus Initiative (Cologne Jazz House Festival) in 1982. They released an album, Unkrodt/Zerbe, which featured piano, synthesizer, and tuba in 1987 with Amiga Records.

Between 1960 and 1980, Unkrodt was a member of the Dixieland Allstars Berlin, and was a featured player on their 1973 album Dixieland Allstars Berlin, produced by Amiga Records. Until 1991, he was a member of the Berlin Brass Quintet, founded in 1982 by members of East Berlin orchestras. They played at the 1989 International Brass Quintet Festival in Baltimore, together with a quintet from West Berlin, the Brandenburg Quintet. He joined the Brassquintett Komische Oper Berlin (Berlin Comic Opera Brass Quintet) in 1991. He performed other solo works as a soloist at home and abroad as well as in radio productions.

Unkrodt taught since 1978 as a professor at the Hochschule für Musik Hanns Eisler, and among his students were Attila Baranyó, Dirk Paulenz, and Leonardas Benediktas Ulevičius. He composed Reige Vortragsliteratur, Tuba 1 und Tuba 2 (Series of Lecture Literature for Tuba 1 and Tuba 2) in 1989. Verlag Neue Musik published the two-volume, eleven composition series which were primarily avant-garde and contemporary styles, featuring high ranges using extended techniques. From 2003 also at the Universität der Künste Berlin. He was a juror at various national and international competitions.

He edited compositions for tuba for the publisher Verlag Neue Musik. He was the inaugural international relations vice president of the Tuba Universal Brotherhood Association, serving for 2 decades. The organization formed in 1973 and since 2001 has been known as the International Tuba Euphonium Association.

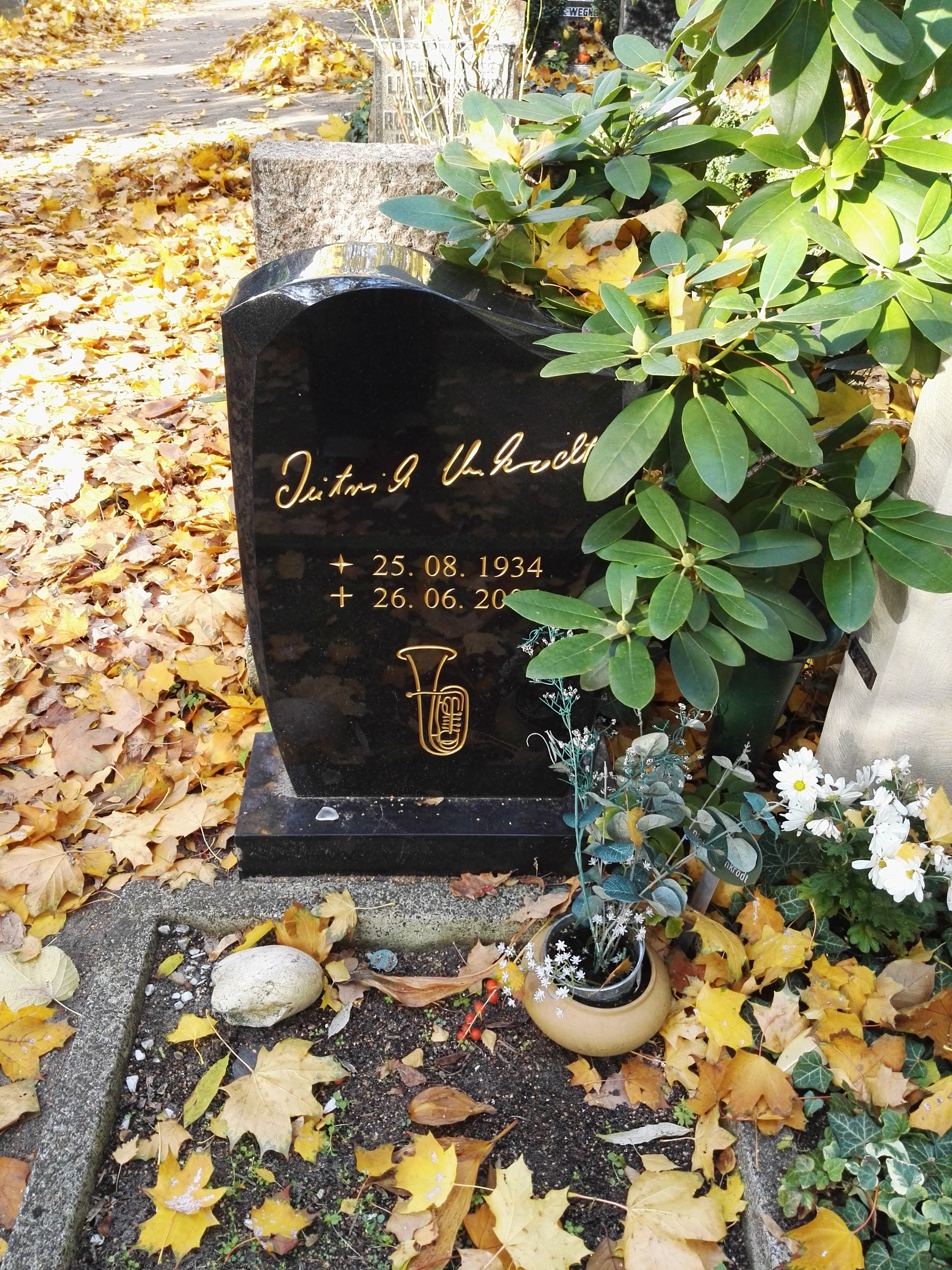
Grave site

Unkrodt died in Cottbus at age 71. He is buried in the Dorotheenstadt Cemetery in Berlin-Mitte. Unkrodt stood out from many East German musicians, who typically only had access to music available in East Berlin, which were written by local composers, and were very conservative. According to composer Martin Mayes, Unkrodt's vision "showed an adventurousness and determination to extend the limits of the tuba both for himself" and other musicians. He was versatile and improvised music to "exploit the unconventional sonorities of the tuba", tackling arrangements from pre-classical to contemporary genres. His extended lip techniques, similar to jazz horn artists like Wynton Marsalis, allowed him to develop his versatility.
