= Kenneth Amis =

- Born: 1970 (age 55–56); Bermuda
- Occupations: Instrumentalist, Professor, Composer
- Instrument: Tuba
- Member of: Empire Brass, MIT Wind Ensemble
- Website: www.kennethamis.com

Kenneth Amis (born 1970) is a Bermudian tuba player and composer best known for his association with the Empire Brass. He is also the assistant conductor of the MIT Wind Ensemble, a group he has been involved with since its creation in 1999. In addition, as of 2005, Amis is an Affiliated Artist of MIT.

He was born and raised in Bermuda. He began studying composition at Boston University at age 16. After that, he earned a master's degree in compsosition from the New England Conservatory of Music. Amis held the International Brass Chair at the Royal Academy of Music in London. He teaches at Lynn University.

Amis was the Project Director and editor of the book: The Brass Player's Cookbook: Creative Recipes for a Successful Performance. He also authored a chapter entitled Are You Just Another Crescendoing Vibrator?

== Performances ==
At many Empire Brass concerts, Amis performs the piano solo from the third movement of Mozart's Sonata in A on his tuba. In addition to his work with the Empire Brass, Amis has performed on tuba for:

- English Chamber Orchestra
- Tanglewood Festival Orchestra
- New World Symphony Orchestra
- Palm Beach Opera Orchestra

== Compositions and commissions ==
His first published work was A Suite for Bass Tuba, composed when he was fifteen years old. He has been commissioned to write music for many groups including:

- Belmont High School Band
- The Massachusetts Instrumental Conductors Association
- New England Conservatory Wind Ensemble
- University of Scranton
- College Band Directors National Association
- Pro Arte Chamber Orchestra of Boston
- Boston Classical Orchestra
- MIT Wind Ensemble

== List of Compositions ==
- Preludes for French Horn, No. 1-5 by Kenneth Amis
- Preludes for Trombone, No. 1-5 by Kenneth Amis

== Teaching ==
Amis is on the faculty at the Longy School of Music, the Boston Conservatory, Boston University, New England Conservatory, and Lynn University

== Awards ==
- Outstanding Alumni Award, New England Conservatory of Music, 2003
