= Hannes Zerbe =

German jazz composer and pianist

Hannes Zerbe (born 17 December 1941) is a German jazz composer and pianist.

== Life ==
Zerbe was born in Litzmannstadt. After studying electrical engineering, he studied piano and musical composition at the Hochschule für Musik "Hanns Eisler" and the Hochschule für Musik Carl Maria von Weber. He has been a professional musician since 1969.

From 1985 to 1987, he was a master student for composition with Paul-Heinz Dittrich at the Akademie der Künste der DDR. Zerbe has organised and led international workshops and tours in the fields of jazz and improvised music since the late 1970s.

Zerbe was a member of the group FEZ (with Conny Bauer, Christoph Niemann and Peter Gröning) and the quintet Osiris (by Joe Sachse with Manfred Hering, Wolfram Dix and Christoph Winckel). In 1979, he founded his large-scale "Hannes Zerbe Blech Band" with which compositions by Hanns Eisler were also performed. From 1980, he also played in a duo with the tuba player Dietrich Unkrodt, and from 1995 in a duo with the clarinettist Jürgen Kupke. Furthermore, Zerbe was involved in text-music projects with actors, directors and singers (for example Lauren Newton), including Bert Brecht, Ingeborg Bachmann, Kurt Schwitters and Heiner Müller.

He has worked with other contemporary jazz musicians (including Willem Breuker, Helmut Forsthoff, Manfred Schulze), Charlie Mariano, Toto Blanke, Bernd Konrad, Klaus Koch and Gebhard Ullmann. Since 1996, he has led the Berlin "Jazzorchester Prokopätz", which performs compositions by Eisler, Weill, Breuker and Zerbe in big band format. Experiences with this workshop line-up flowed into the "Hannes Zerbe Jazz Orchester", founded in 2011. In a duo with the saxophonist Dirk Engelhardt, he also improvises on poems by Gottfried Benn.

Among other works, Zerbe wrote a Concerto for Alto Saxophone and Orchestra and Reflections on Eisler's Winter Battle Suite. He also composed for film.

Zerbe is also involved in political contexts. With his ensemble and with the actor Rolf Becker in the cultural programme of the Rosa Luxemburg Conference of the left-wing daily newspaper junge Welt, he arranged the performance of Das Floß der Medusa – Requiem für Che Guevara by Hans Werner Henze.

== Recordings ==
- Blech Band (Amiga 1984)
- Rondo a la Fried (BVHaast 1992)
- Ochsenkarren with Unkrodt and the Bläservereinigung Berlin (1994)
- Brecht: Alles wandelt sich with Gina Pietsch (vocals) and Jürgen Kupke (clarinet) (1991)
- Jazzorchester Prokopätz (2005)
- Peter Hacks: Was träumt der Teufel with Gina Pietsch (Ohreule 2009)
- Hannes Zerbe Jazz Orchester Eisleriana (2011 JazzHausMusik)
- Hannes Zerbe Jazz Orchester Erlkönig (2013 JazzHausMusik)
- Hannes Zerbe/Jazz Orchestra Berlin: Kalkutta (2017 JazzHausMusik)

== Radio play music ==
- 1992: Heinrich Traulsen: König und Besenbinder – direction: Peter Groeger (Kinderhörspiel – DS Kultur)
