= Tarita Virtue =

- Born: February 16, 1970 (age 56)
- Education: Harvard University; Rollings College; University of Miami; University of Florida
- Occupation: Private investigator

Tarita Virtue (born February 16, 1970) is a Trinidadian-American private detective/investigator and model.

== Childhood ==
Tarita Virtue was born in Port of Spain, Trinidad and Tobago on February 16, 1970. She was a premature baby (arriving two months early) and weighed 4 lbs. 4 ounces. She was born to a racially and ethnically mixed Trinidadian mother and Jamaican father, and was raised in Boca Raton, Florida. According to her biography, the most common question that she is asked is "What are you?" She usually responds with the answer of "a little bit of everything."

The origins of her name stems from her premature birth during Carnival, a regional celebration in the Caribbean during the Northern Hemisphere's early spring or late winter. Since the offices during that time usually do not run at full capacity, her parents hastily came up with a name, naming her after the Tahitian wife of Marlon Brando, Tarita Teriipaia, after reading a magazine article about the couple.

== Education ==
Whilst attending Spanish River High School in Boca Raton, Florida she was both the "Homecoming Queen" and "Student Government President".

Virtue attended law school at The University of Florida, in Gainesville, FL. During college, she attended summer programs at Harvard University, Florida Atlantic University and the University of Miami.

She majored in Sociology at Rollins College in Winter Park, FL.

== Awards, career and achievements ==
Virtue was selected as "The Sexiest Private Investigator in America" by Maxim Magazine after her work with Anthony Pellicano ("the PI to the Stars") became public. She has since changed career paths and is now a successful actress and model.

== Trivia ==
Before becoming an actress and model, Tarita was a Private Investigator at The Pellicano Investigative Agency in Los Angeles, California.

Tarita is Jewish and studies Kabbalah.

She has been a vegetarian for over 17 years.

Tarita owns or has owned, several dogs, cats, a potbellied pig, parrots, chinchillas, a bearded dragon, duck, fish.

== Other work ==
2005 Calendar Model - Predator Records

Field Reporter (Options House) - Viacommunity Day I (Paramount Pictures & Viacom)

Rosasen Clothing - Model

Segment Reporter (School for the Blind) - Viacommunity Day II (Paramount Pictures & Viacom)

PSA - LA County Fire Department (C.E.R.T. Program Volunteer)

Music video: The Strays - "Life Support"

Music video: Story Of The Year - "Anthem of Our Dying Day"

Music video: Mexiclan - "Como Le Hago"

Print Work for Spider-Man 3 (2007).

Public service announcement for The ONE Campaign [www.one.org] (2006)

Movie Theatre Promo for The Pink Panther - played a young mother in the front row (2006)

Music video: (Played Paula Abdul) Patrick Hall - "One for the Ages"

== Publicity ==
Articles: New York Daily News (USA), 6 February 2006. Front Page, "Exciting testimony on tap?"

Maxim Magazine (USA), April 2005, pp. 112–115, by Judy Dutton, "To Cheat or Not To Cheat: You Want to, you'd love to, but should you? Check out these tales of guys who did, and proceed with extreme caution."

Arizona Daily Star (USA), 3 March 2005, p. 1, by Phil Villarreal, "Be Cool - A to Z" Vanity Fair (USA), 1 March 2004, Iss. 523, pp. 222–237, by: Howard Blum & John Connolly, "The Pellicano Brief"

Pictorials: Maxim Magazine (USA), April 2005, p. 115, by Tarita Virtue, "Field Test: Love Stinks (Our reporter Tarita tests the resolve of 10 married men. Oops!"

Maxim Magazine (USA), 1 October 2003, Vol. 2003, Iss. 70, p. 34, by Charlie Langella, "Sexiest Private Investigator in America".
