= Musashino Academia Musicae =

Music university in Japan

Coordinates: 35°44′28.81″N 139°40′19.85″E

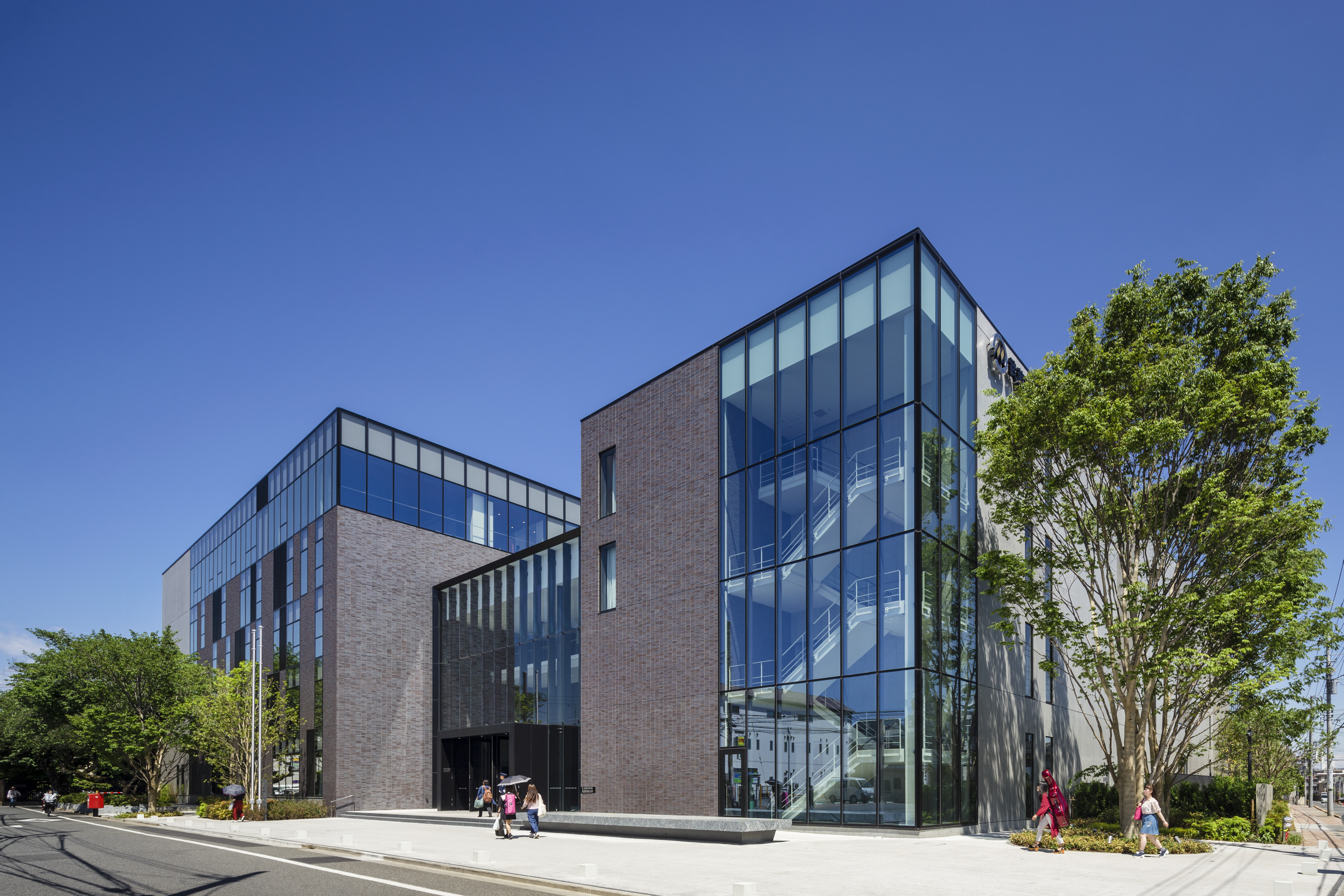
- Musashino Academia Musicae
- Type: Private
- Established: 1929
- President: Naotaka Fukui
- Location: 1-13-1 Hazawa, Nerima-ku, Tokyo 176-8521 Japan, Nerima-ku, Tokyo, Japan
- Campus: Urban
- Website: www.musashino-music.ac.jp

Musashino Academia Musicae (武蔵野音楽大学, Musashino Ongaku Daigaku), located in Tokyo, Japan, is a music conservatory founded in 1929.

After World War II, the music school expanded, becoming the Musashino College of Music. It now has educational sites in Nerima, Iruma, Saitama, and Tama, Tokyo.

== Concert halls ==
Musashino Academia Musicae owns four music halls:

- Beethoven Hall
- Bach Saal
- Mozart Hall
- Schubert Hall

== Notable faculty ==
- Kálmán Berkes (clarinet and conductor)
- Roger Bobo (tuba)

== Graduates ==
- Makoto Nakura (marimba)
- Toshiro Ohmi, Japanese popular singer, TV personality
- Saori Kobayashi, Japanese video game composer
