= Mike Mineo =

American singer

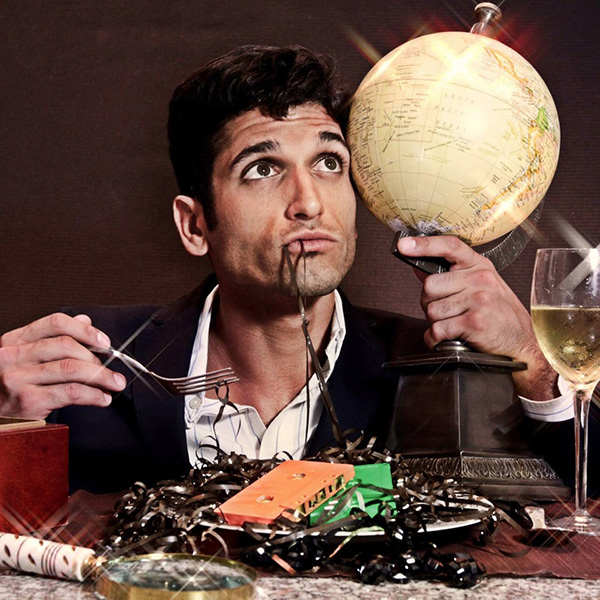
- Born: Hollywood, Florida
- Occupation: Singer-songwriter

Mike Mineo is an American singer-songwriter and multi-instrumentalist born in Hollywood, Florida. His musical style encompasses avant-garde, pop, folk, soul, and jazz. He has recorded and self-released four albums on his own independent record label Nevernothing Records, LLC. In March 2016 Mike Mineo moved to Nashville, Tennessee, to further his music career.

== Career ==
In 2010, Mike Mineo released his first album Eccentricity. The single "Eazy Livin" was well received by college radio and was licensed to iHome for their studio series home entertainment systems. The other single "Peaceful Daze" (also from "Eccentricity") was licensed to the popular E! Television show Khloé & Lamar in season 1 episode 7 "Jamie 9-1-1". In the summer of 2010 he was awarded "Best Male Vocalist" of 2010 by the local weekly paper Broward New Times. On August 17 through October 20, 2010, he went on tour to support his debut release of "Eccentricity" and played dates throughout the U.S. & Canada. During this tour the press and media started to claim him as a modern-day Frank Zappa In 2011 Mike Mineo formed the group MINEO and released his next album "Beach Season" Their song "Brand New Feeling" was well received by college radio and was featured on Austin Texas's college radio station 93.3 KGSR. This song made the MINEO band become a featured top up and coming artist to look out for in 2011 Both albums were produced by Brent T. Williams a.k.a. Teasley. In late 2013 Mike Mineo released the album "Big Big Star". "Big Big Star" was produced and engineered by Mike Mineo himself at his home in Delray Beach, Florida. "Big Big Star" was mastered by Matthew de Nobrega at Timecode Mastering Studio in Cape Town, South Africa. The same engineer that is known for his work with Die Antwoord. In March 2016 Mike Mineo moved to Nashville, TN and released his 4th album "1". Mike Mineo was announced as a headliner at the 2016 SunFest In 2017, Mike Mineo was brought on to open for Steve Miller Band during their Southeast leg of their tour. Mineo performs with drummer Scotty Rollins and brother Johnny Mineo. Some of his musical influences include Stevie Wonder, Van Morrison, Tom Waits & Frank Zappa.

== Discography ==
What Love Is

- Released: 2021
- Label: Red 9 Records
- Producer: BLOU
