= Øystein Baadsvik =

Norwegian tubist (born 1966)

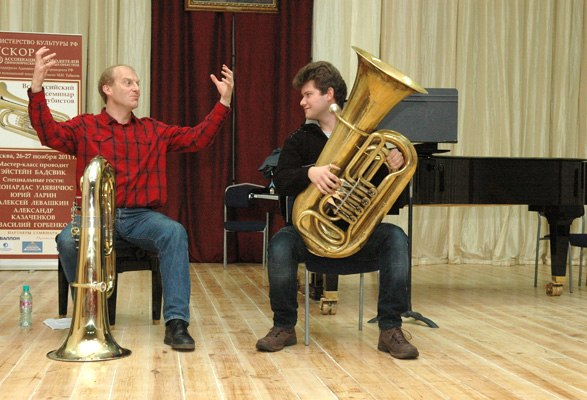
- Baadsvik and a pupil

Background information
- Born: 14 August 1966 (age 59); Trondheim, Norway
- Genres: Classical
- Occupations: Soloist, professor
- Instrument: Tuba

Øystein Baadsvik (born 14 August 1966) is a Norwegian tuba soloist and chamber musician. The accolade is notable as the tuba is rarely an instrument that receives solo attention. Baadsvik is recognized as one of the world's most prominent tuba players.

== Biography ==
Born in Trondheim, Norway, he began playing the tuba at the age of fifteen at his school in Trondheim, Norway, and won first prize at eighteen in a Norwegian national competition for soloists. His concert engagements include performances with orchestras such as the Oslo Philharmonic Orchestra, Bergen Philharmonic, Warsaw Philharmonic Orchestra, the Taipei National Symphony Orchestra, Singapore Philharmonic and Melbourne Symphony Orchestra. 2006 he made his New York recital debut at Carnegie Hall. He studied under the tuba player Harvey Phillips and with Arnold Jacobs. Øystein Baadsvik’s international career began in 1991 when he was awarded two prizes at Concours International d’Exécution Musicale in Geneva.

Øystein Baadsvik is known for his master classes, performances, and tuba clinics which are frequently held in numerous universities throughout the world including The Juilliard School, Indiana University, Cleveland Institute of Music, Northwestern University, Shepherd School of Music at Rice University, the University of Wisconsin–Madison, Texas Christian University, The Royal College of Music Eastern Connecticut State University, Old Dominion University, Emory University and the University of Kentucky. In addition, every October, a tour of various colleges and universities occurs, coinciding with Octubafest, a yearly celebration of tuba music.

Baadsvik has been described as "the only independent virtuoso tuba soloist in the world; he may be the greatest tuba player, period". Baadsvik is known for his effort to bring the instrument to the forefront of orchestral performances, and to include the instrument in compositions where it is seldom seen, such as in Vivaldi's "Winter".

== Fnugg ==
One of Baadsvik's most well-known works is Fnugg (Norwegian for something small, like a snowflake). Fnugg was originally written for solo Tuba and features a variety of unique performance skills, including "lip beats" and multiphonics. It was later modified, with a major addition for either brass band or concert band and was titled Fnugg Blue. His YouTube performance of Fnugg Blue was very theatrical in nature, with dancing and clapping from the audience.

== CDs ==
- Tuba Works – 1992 (Simax)
- Tuba Carnival – 2003 (BIS)
- Danzas – 2006 (BIS)
- Kalevi Aho tuba concerto – 2007 (BIS)
- Prelude, Fnugg, and Riffs – 2007 (BIS)
- 20th Century Tuba Concertos – 2008 (BIS)
- 21st Century Tuba Concertos – 2009 (BIS)
- Ferry Tales – 2010 (BIS)
- Snowflakes – 2011 (BIS)
- Chameleon – 2012 (BIS)
- Øystein Baadsvik plays Tuba Concertos - 2014 (BIS)
- Journey - 2018 (BIS)
