= Yasuhito Sugiyama =

Japanese orchestral tuba player (born 1967)

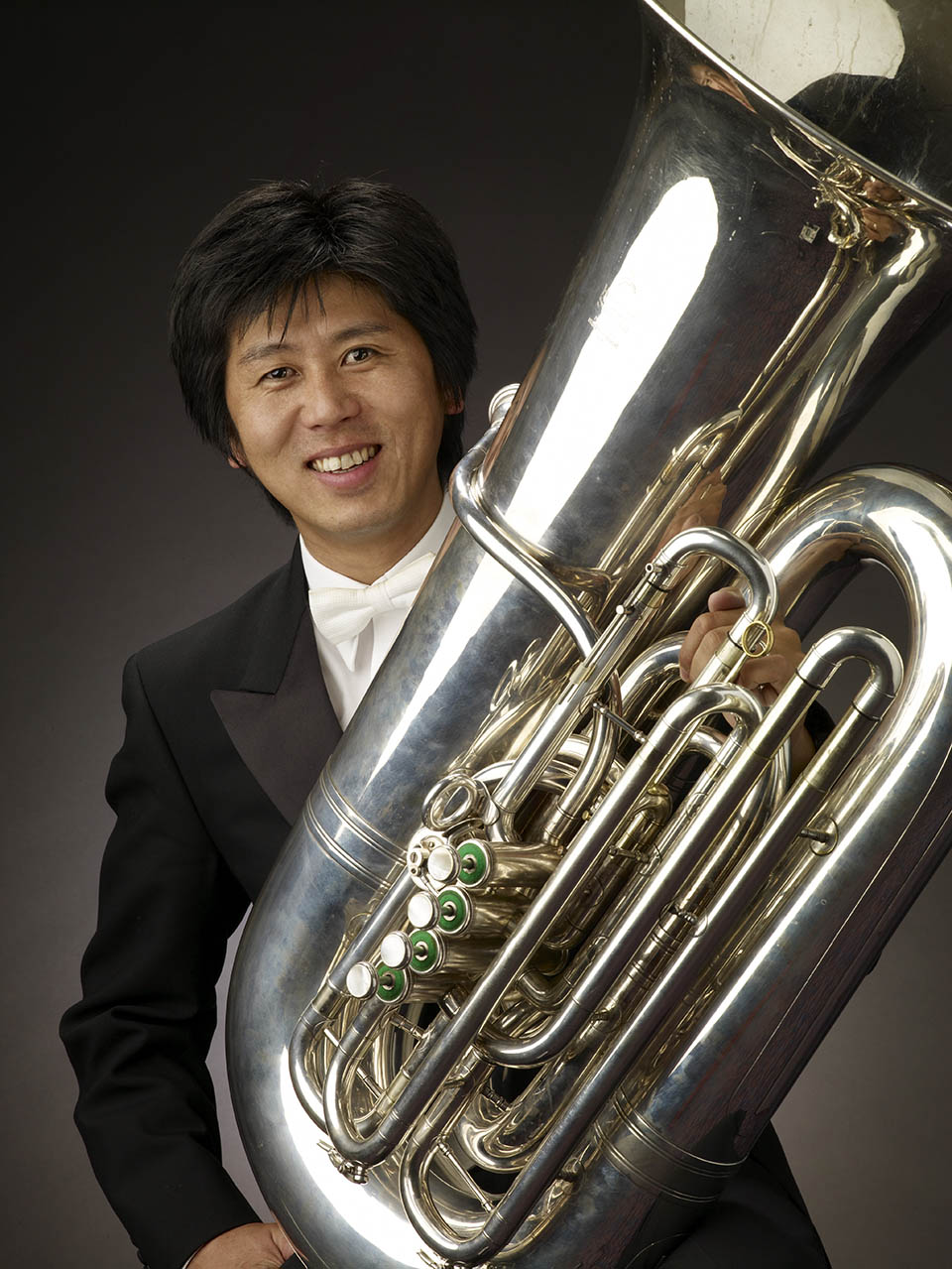
Image of Yasuhito Sugiyama

Yasuhito Sugiyama (杉山 康人, Sugiyama Yasuhito; born 1967) is a Japanese orchestral tuba player. Sugiyama is the first successful applicant as an Asian to the audition for Wiener Staatsoper Orchester. Since 2006, Sugiyama has played in the Cleveland Orchestra and serves as principal tuba.

== Biography ==
- 1990 - Graduated from Soai University.
- August 1990 - Kyoto Symphony Orchestra Guest player. (until 1991)
- 1993 - Accompany the Osaka Philharmonic Orchestra Europe Tour.
- October 1995 - Joined the Osaka Symphoniker. (until 1996)
- November 1995 - Awarded 1st Prize in Japan Wind and Percussion Competition (Category Tuba)
- September 1997 - Joined the New Japan Philharmonic. (until 2003)
- 1998 - Participated in Saito Kinen Festival Matsumoto.
- June 2003 - Won the first successful applicant as an Asian to the audition for Wiener Staatsoper Orchester.
- 2006 - Joined the Cleveland Orchestra.
