= Joachim Gruner =

German composer and percussionist

Joachim Gruner (18 August 1933 – 23 September 2011) was a German composer and percussionist.

== Life ==
Born in Neukölln, Gruner received piano, organ and violin lessons as a child. After Abitur, which he took in West Berlin for political reasons, he worked for two years in a chemical company in East Berlin before he began studying at the West Berlin Academy of Music in 1953. He was taught by Hans Lembens in timpani and percussion, by Heinz Friedrich Hartig in harmony, by Boris Blacher in instrumentation and by Ernst Pepping in counterpoint. He also received private lessons from Blacher and Hartig, through which he became acquainted with contemporary music.

After completing his studies, Gruner joined the Mecklenburg State Theatre as a drummer and after a season of playing at the Städtische Bühnen Erfurt. From 1962 until the end of his working life, he was employed at the Komische Oper Berlin, where he met the conductor Kurt Masur, whom he had met in Schwerin, and experienced Walter Felsenstein as artistic director.

Through the Komische Oper as a working environment, he received commissions for compositions, such as the Four Symphonic Caprices for wind orchestra, with which he attracted the attention of Klaus-Peter Bruchmann. This was followed by further works for brass instruments, but also chamber music works for various instrumentations and two operas.

His musical legacy is kept in the German Composers' Archive in the Europäisches Zentrum der Künste Hellerau.

Gruner died in Berlin at the age of 78.
