= Rolf Smedvig =

American musician

Rolf Thorstein Smedvig (September 23, 1952 – April 27, 2015) was an American classical trumpeter. He was the founder of the Empire Brass quintet. He was renowned for his exemplary tone and accurate intonation.

== Biography ==
Rolf Smedvig was born in Seattle, Washington. His father Egil Steinar Smedvig (1922–2012) was a composer and music teacher who had immigrated from Stavanger, Norway. His mother Kristin (Jonsson) Smedvig (1921-2004) was member of the Seattle Symphony's violin section who had immigrated from Iceland.

In 1965, at age 13, Smedvig joined the Seattle Youth Symphony Orchestras as their principal trumpet. In 1971, he participated in the summer music program at Tanglewood Music Center. Leonard Bernstein chose him to be the trumpet soloist for the 1971 world premiere of his composition Mass which was composed for the opening of the John F. Kennedy Center for the Performing Arts.

Smedvig studied music under the tutelage of Roger Voisin at Boston University, where Smedvig later served as an instructor. In 1971, aged 19, Smedvig joined the Boston Symphony as assistant principal trumpet. At the time, Smedvig was the youngest member of the orchestra. He was promoted to principal trumpet in 1979, and left in 1981 to focus on a solo career, conducting, and chamber music.

Smedvig co-founded the Empire Brass brass quintet in 1972. The quinted served as Faculty Quintet-in-Residence at Boston University for a number of years. The group was the first brass quintet to win a Walter W. Naumburg Foundation award. The group has released over twenty albums.

== Personal life ==
Smedvig's first marriage to Caroline Elisabeth Hessberg, the daughter of New York lawyer Al Hessberg, ended in divorce after Caroline had an affair with singer-songwriter James Taylor. Smedvig later married Kelly Holub in 1992, with whom he had four children.

Smedvig died of a heart attack at his home in West Stockbridge, Massachusetts, on April 27, 2015, at the age of 62. His manager Mark Z. Alpert announced that the Empire Brass would continue; Derek Lockhart replaced Smedvig as first trumpeter and Eric Berlin joined as its second trumpeter.
