= Empire Brass =

Brass quintet

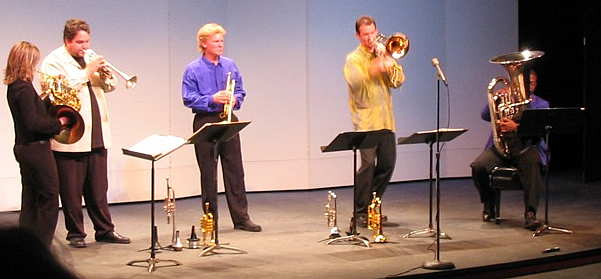
- Empire Brass performing in 2006

Background information
- Origin: Massachusetts, U.S.
- Years active: 1971–present
- Members: Derek Lockhart; Eric Berlin; Victor Sungarian; Greg Spiridopoulos; Kenneth Amis
- Past members: Mark Hetzler; Luiz Garcia; Eric Ruske; Rolf Smedvig; Charles Lewis; Gregory Miller; David Ohanian; Mark H. Lawrence; Scott A. Hartman; Michelle Perry; Sam Pilafian; Martin Hackleman; Jeffrey Curnow; Norman Bolter; Lawrence Isaacson; Douglas Wright; Timothy Morrison; Andrew Pelletier
- Website: www.empirebrass.com

Empire Brass is a brass quintet from the United States. The group was founded in 1971. The original members met at Tanglewood Music Center (in Lenox, Massachusetts) in 1970.

== Description and history ==
The quintet chose its name after performing in New York City. (New York is the Empire State.) They continue to tour regularly in North America, Europe, and Asia. They have been the Faculty Quintet-in-Residence at Boston University since 1976.

The Empire Brass have appeared on Good Morning America, Today Show and Mister Rogers' Neighborhood. They also make joint concert appearances with organist Douglas Major.

From 1977 to 1978, and again from 2001 to 2003, they performed with the Naumburg Orchestral Concerts, in the Naumburg Bandshell, Central Park (NY), summer series.

== Members ==
As of May 2015, its members include:

- Derek Lockhart, trumpet
- Eric Berlin, trumpet
- Victor Sungarian, French horn
- Greg Spiridopoulos, trombone
- Kenneth Amis, tuba

Previous members include:

- Rolf Smedvig, trumpet, founder; died April 27, 2015
- Sam Pilafian, tuba, founder; died April 5, 2019.
- Charles Lewis, trumpet, founder; died December 19, 2025

== Discography ==
- Russian Brass (1977)
- Baroque Brass (1977)
- Empire Brass Quintet and Friends - American Brass Band Journal (1978)
- Renaissance Brass (1979)
- Broadway Brass (1980)
- Empire Brass Quintet (Hovhaness, Hindemith, Bohme, Dvorak) (1980)
- The Empire Brass Plays Annie (1981)
- Pachelbel: Kanon & Other Baroque Favorites (1982)
- A Bach Festival (1986)
- Joy to the World, Music of Christmas (1988)
- Empire Brass plays Bernstein, Gershwin & Tilson Thomas (1988)
- Fireworks (1988)
- Class Brass (1989)
- Music of Gabrieli (1989)
- Music for Organ, Brass & Percussion (1990)
- Royal Brass: Music from Renaissance & Baroque (1990)
- Braggin' in Brass (1991)
- Romantic Brass (1992)
- On Broadway (1992)
- Class Brass - On the Edge (1993)
- Mozart for Brass (1993)
- Passage (1994)
- The World Sings: An Empire Brass Christmas (1996)
- King's Court and Celtic Fair (1996)
- Greatest Hits (1997)
- Class Brass: Firedance (1999)
- The Glory of Gabrieli (2002)
- Baroque Music for Brass and Organ (2003)
- A Bach Festival for Brass & Organ (2005)
