= John Van Houten (tubist) =

American orchestral tuba player

- Born: Anaheim, California, U.S.
- Education: University of Southern California
- Occupation: Musician

John Joseph Van Houten Jr. is an American orchestral tuba player. He is most notable for playing in various film soundtracks. John holds a Bachelor's degree and a Master's degree in tuba performance from the University of Southern California, where he studied with Tommy Johnson. John is a freelance tubist in the Los Angeles area. Some of the ensembles he performed with include the Los Angeles Philharmonic, Los Angeles Opera, Long Beach Opera, and New West Symphony.

His performing experience also includes phonograph recordings with such diverse artists as Burt Bacharach, Elvis Costello, Carly Simon, and Alice Cooper, in addition to television shows (such as Alias, The Simpsons, Futurama, American Dad!, Family Guy and King of the Hill), records, jingles and a wide variety of motion pictures, such as Mission: Impossible, Crimson Tide, Dracula, Species, Virtuosity, Mars Attacks!, Murder at 1600, The Thin Red Line, Men in Black, X-Men, Dude, Where's My Car?, Pearl Harbor, Swordfish, Legally Blonde, Collateral Damage, Planet of the Apes, The Core, Daredevil, Piglet's Big Movie, Hulk, Pirates of the Caribbean, Paycheck, Hollywood Homicide, The Chronicles of Riddick, The Day After Tomorrow, Spider-Man 2 and 3, The Incredibles, Ratatouille, Up, and Star Trek.

Van Houten has also served as music contractor/orchestra manager on numerous films, commercials, video games, and live orchestral productions. He also has taught and teaches at several universities and colleges in the Southern California area, including UCLA, California State University, Long Beach, Concordia University Irvine, Azusa Pacific University, Cerritos College, Biola University, Pasadena City College, and Irvine Valley College.
