= Gene Pokorny =

American tubist (born 1953)

- Born: May 15, 1953 (age 73)
- Genres: Classical
- Occupation: Musician
- Instrument: Tuba
- Member of: Chicago Symphony Orchestra
- Formerly of: Israel Philharmonic; Utah Symphony; Saint Louis Symphony Orchestra; Los Angeles Philharmonic

Gene Pokorny (born May 15, 1953) is an American tubist. He has played with the Chicago Symphony Orchestra since his appointment by Georg Solti in 1988. He has also played with the Israel Philharmonic, the Utah Symphony, the Saint Louis Symphony Orchestra, and the Los Angeles Philharmonic. Pokorny has performed on several movie soundtracks including Jurassic Park, The Fugitive, and The Nightmare Before Christmas and has recorded three solo albums. In June 2000, he premiered John D. Stevens’ piece Journey – Concerto for Contrabass Tuba and Orchestra with the Chicago Symphony. He has written a chapter on orchestral auditions for the Tuba Source Book published by Indiana University Press, as well as articles for the Tuba Journal and The Instrumentalist.

Pokorny has participated in numerous educational workshops, classes, and presentations, including McGill University's Brass Year program in 2009 and the annual Pokorny Brass Seminar at the University of Redlands, where he studied. He describes himself as a railfan enthusiast and a lifetime fan of The Three Stooges.

== Discography ==
- Tuba Tracks (1995)
- Orchestral Excerpts for Tuba (1997)
- Big Boy (2001)
