= Roger Bobo =

American musician (1938–2023)

- Born: June 8, 1938; Los Angeles, California, U.S.
- Died: February 12, 2023 (aged 84); Oaxaca, Mexico
- Education: Eastman School of Music
- Occupations: Tubist, conductor, teacher
- Years active: 1961–2023

Roger Bobo (June 8, 1938 – February 12, 2023) was an American tuba virtuoso and brass pedagogue. He retired from active tuba performance in 2001 in order to devote his time to conducting and teaching. He gave what is reputed to be the first solo tuba recital in the history of Carnegie Recital Hall. His solo and ensemble discography is extensive. He was the author of "Mastering the Tuba" published by Editions Bim (CH). While living in the US, he was the resident conductor of the Topanga Philharmonic Orchestra. He has been a guest conductor with numerous orchestras and chamber ensembles in North America, Europe and Asia.

As of 2023 Bobo lived in Oaxaca, Mexico, from which he conducted numerous virtual masterclasses and lessons. As of 2018, Bobo resided in Tokyo, Japan and teaching at Musashino Academy of Music in Tokyo. Before moving to Tokyo he served as faculty at the Fiesole School of Music near Florence, Italy, at the Lausanne Conservatory in Switzerland, at the Rotterdams Konservatorium in the Netherlands, and at the Royal Northern College of Music in Manchester, England. Roger held a bachelor's degree from the Eastman School of Music.

Major orchestral appointments include:

- Rochester Philharmonic Orchestra, 1956–1962 (Erich Leinsdorf, cond.)
- Royal Concertgebouw Orchestra, Amsterdam, 1962–1964 (Bernard Haitink, cond.)
- Los Angeles Philharmonic, 1964–1989 (Zubin Mehta, Carlo Maria Giulini, André Previn cond.)

Bobo was the subject of the John Updike poem "Recital".

Alexander Arutiunian dedicated his Concerto for tuba and symphony orchestra (1992) in 3 movements to Bobo.

Bobo died on February 12, 2023, at the age of 84.

== LPs & CDs ==
- Roger Bobo Plays Tuba
- Prunes
- Botuba
- Tuba Libera
- Gravity Is Light Today
- Bobissimo
- Rainbo-bo

With Lalo Schifrin

- Rock Requiem (Verve, 1971)

== Sources ==
- Roger Bobo – Brass Legend and Educator
