= Arnold Jacobs =

American tubist (1915–1998

- Born: Arnold Maurice Jacobs; June 11, 1915; Philadelphia, Pennsylvania, U.S.
- Died: October 7, 1998 (aged 83); Chicago, Illinois, U.S.
- Education: Curtis Institute of Music
- Occupations: Musician, teacher
- Spouse: Gizella Valfy (m. 1937)
- Children: 1
- Musical career
- Genres: Classical
- Instrument: Tuba
- Years active: 1936–1988
- Formerly of: Indianapolis Symphony Orchestra; Pittsburgh Symphony Orchestra; All-American Youth Orchestra; Chicago Symphony Orchestra

Arnold Maurice Jacobs (June 11, 1915 – October 7, 1998) was an American tubist who spent most of his career with the Chicago Symphony Orchestra. He held that position from 1944 until his retirement in 1988.

Jacobs was considered one of the foremost brass pedagogues of his time as well as an expert on breathing as it related to brasswind, woodwind, and vocal performance. Due to childhood illness and adult onset asthma, his lung capacity was significantly impaired. He is best remembered for his playing philosophy which he referred to as "Song and Wind."

== Life and performing career ==
Jacobs was born in Philadelphia on June 11, 1915, but was raised in California. Jacobs' family enjoyed music and he credited his mother, a keyboard artist, for his initial interest in music. He spent his youth progressing from bugle to trumpet to trombone and finally to tuba. When he was fifteen years old, he entered Philadelphia's Curtis Institute of Music on a scholarship and continued to major in tuba.

After his graduation from Curtis in 1936, he played two seasons in the Indianapolis Symphony Orchestra under Fabien Sevitzky. From 1939 until 1944, he was the tubist of the Pittsburgh Symphony Orchestra under Fritz Reiner. In 1941, Jacobs toured the country with Leopold Stokowski and the All-American Youth Orchestra. He was a member of the Chicago Symphony from 1944 until his retirement in 1988.

During his forty-four year tenure with the Chicago Symphony Orchestra (CSO), he took temporary leave in the spring of 1949 to tour England and Scotland with the Philadelphia Orchestra. He was on the faculty of Western State College's Music Camp at Gunnison, Colorado, during the early 1960s. In June 1962, he had the honor of being the first tuba player invited to play at the Casals Festival in Puerto Rico. Mr. Jacobs and colleagues from the CSO were part of the famous 1968 recording of Gabrieli's music with members of the Philadelphia and Cleveland Orchestras. He was also a founding member of the Chicago Symphony Brass Quintet, appeared as a soloist with the CSO on several occasions, and recorded the Vaughan Williams Concerto for Bass Tuba and Orchestra with Daniel Barenboim conducting the Chicago Symphony. In recognition of his outstanding career, in 2001, the Chicago Symphony's tuba chair was dedicated as the Arnold Jacobs Principal Tuba Chair, Endowed by Christine Querfeld. Jacobs was succeeded in the CSO by Gene Pokorny.

== Teaching ==
Jacobs had the reputation as both the master performer and master teacher. He taught tuba at Northwestern University. He also taught lessons on all wind instruments in his private studio. He was one of the most sought-after teachers in the world, specializing in respiratory and motivational applications for brass and woodwind instruments and voice. His students include many in orchestras and university faculties around the world.

Jacobs gave lectures and clinics throughout the world. During the CSO's 1977 and 1985 Japanese tours, Jacobs presented clinics in Tokyo. In January 1978, he lectured at Chicago's Michael Reese Hospital about playing wind instruments for the therapeutic treatment of asthma in children. He presented masterclasses at Northwestern University a week each summer from 1980 to 1998. The Second International Brass Congress presented its highest award to him in 1984. In 1991, he presented a clinic for the United States Marine Band in Washington D.C. He gave masterclasses as part of the Hearst Scholar program at the University of Northern Iowa and the Housewright Chair at Florida State University.

The Midwest Clinic presented Jacobs their highest award, the Medal of Honor, in 1985. In 1994, The Chicago Federation of Musicians awarded him for Lifetime Achievement at the first Living Art of Music awards. During his eightieth birthday celebration in 1995, he presented a lecture to the International Brassfest at Indiana University and the International Tuba-Euphonium Conference at Northwestern University. Northwestern's School of Music presented him the first Legends of Teaching award. Mayor Richard M. Daley proclaimed June 25, 1995, as Arnold Jacobs Day in the City of Chicago.

Jacobs was given an honorary Doctor of Music degrees from the VanderCook College of Music in 1986 and DePaul University in June 1995.

== Legacy ==
Several books written by students about Jacobs are available, Arnold Jacobs, The Legacy of a Master edited by M. Dee Stewart, Arnold Jacobs: Song and Wind by Brian Frederiksen, Teaching Brass by Kristian Steenstrup, Lasting Change for Trumpeters: The Pedagogical Approach of Arnold Jacobs' and 'Brass Singers: The Teaching of Arnold Jacobs' by Dr. Luis E. Loubriel, and Also Sprach Arnold Jacobs compiled by Bruce Nelson. Two compact discs, Arnold Jacobs Portrait of an Artist and Arnold Jacobs Legacy of an Artist, were compiled by Frank Byrne as audio "time capsules" of his voice and playing.
