= Orit Wolf =

Israeli pianist and composer (born 1974)

Orit Wolf אורית וולף
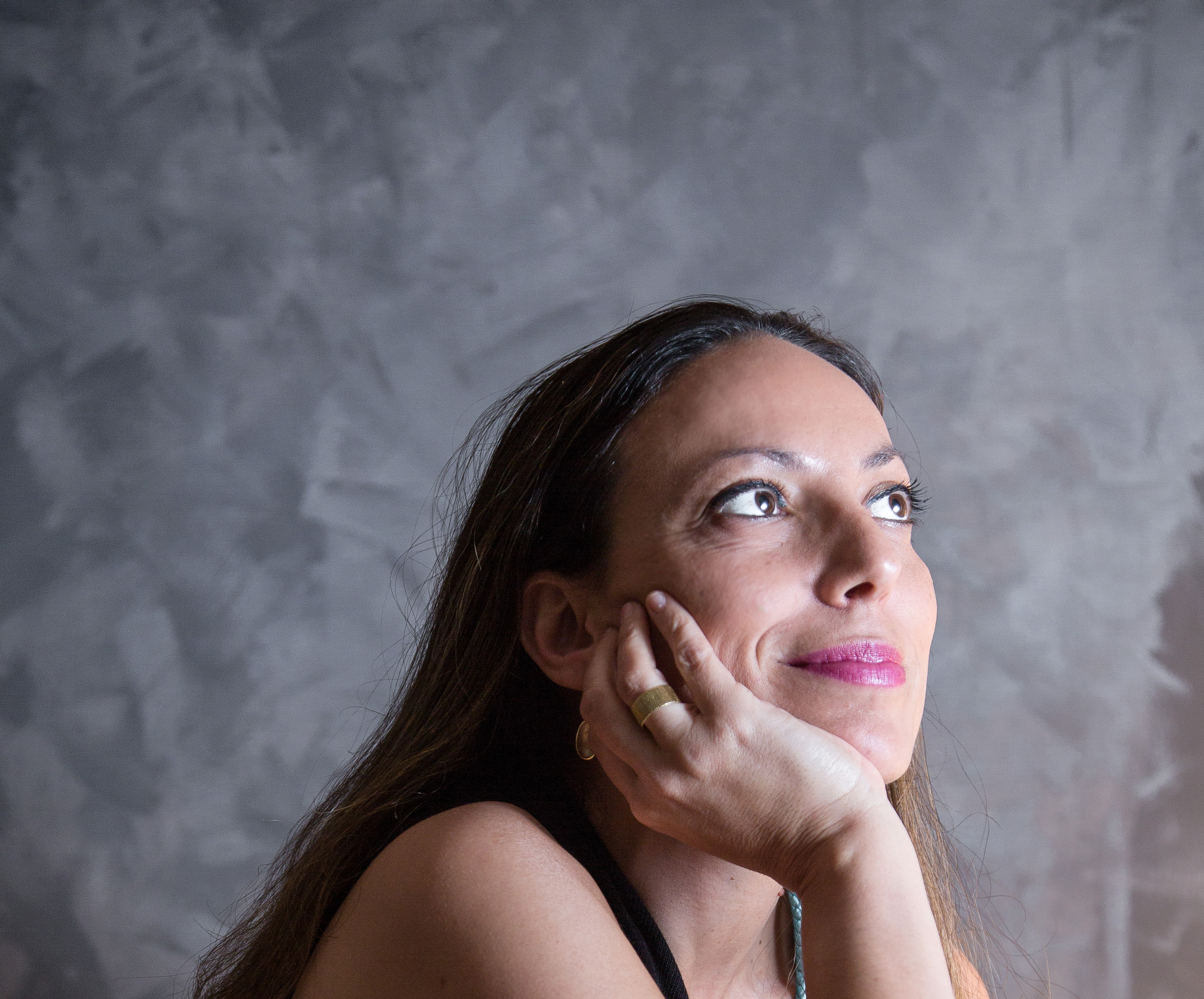

Background information
- Born: October 8, 1974 (age 51); Tel Aviv
- Genres: classical
- Occupations: pianist, composer, poet, consultant, speaker, professor of creative arts.
- Instrument: piano
- Spouse: Prof. Mordechay Segev
- Website: www.oritwolf.com

Orit Wolf (Hebrew: אורית וולף; born 8 October 1974 in Tel Aviv) is an Israeli pianist, composer, poet and lecturer. She is an Associate Professor of Creative Arts at the Department of Humanities & Arts at the Technion- Israel Institute of Technology.

== Education ==
Starting at the age of six, Orit Wolf studied piano with Hanna Shalgi. At the age of 16, she graduated from Thelma Yelin High School for the Arts and studied with Alexander Volkov. She then began her academic studies at the Tel Aviv University under the direction of Arie Vardi. She also studied music composition and improvisation with Andre Hajdu while attending masterclasses given by Leon Fleisher, Claude Frank, Menachem Pressler, György Sebők, Gilbert Kalish and Peter Serkin.

In 1991, Wolf attended the Boston University Tanglewood Institute and then received a full Dean's scholarship to Boston University. She graduated from Boston University summa cum laude in piano performance under Benjamin Pasternack and Composer Lukas Foss.

Wolf received a post-graduate degree and her master's from the Royal Academy of Music in 1998 under the direction of Christopher Elton. She was also studying with Maria Curcio.

In 2007, Wolf earned a PhD under the President Scholarships from Bar-Ilan University in Musicology. Her thesis title was "Beethoven as Heard by the Romantics: A Study of Romantic Style Cadenzas Composed to Beethoven's Fourth Piano Concerto". Her tutor was Judit Frygiesi.

== Performances and distinctions ==
At the age of 11, Wolf was invited to perform in Germany and Belgium on behalf of the Israel Broadcasting Authority. From age of 14, she has recorded played live concerts and performances for Kol Ha-Musica, an Israeli classical music radio station, including her own compositions. She is a recipient of the America Israel Cultural Foundations Scholarships (1984-1990) and won the best contemporary music performance by the Israel Council for Culture with Menachen Zur's Circle of Times piece.

Wolf has performed as a soloist and with various orchestras including the Israel Philharmonic Orchestra, Israel Chamber Orchestra, Jerusalem Symphony Orchestra, Rishon LeZion Symphony, Beer Sheva Symphony, Ra'anana Sinfonet, Wraslaw Philharmonic, Royal Academy Symphony Orchestra and the English Chamber Orchestra. She has played at the Tanglewood Music Festival and Israel Festival, Jerusalem Pianos Festival, East & West Festival (Netherlands) and the Upper Galilee Music Festival. She has played in concert halls such as the Wigmore Hall, St. Martin in the Fields Hall (London), Boston Symphony Hall, the Concertgebouw (Amsterdam) Tsai Performance Center (Boston) and the Alte Oper (Frankfurt).

Wolf has collaborated with numerous international artists and ensembles such as St. Lawrence String Quartet, Aviv Quartet, Joanna MacGregor, Nobuko Imai, Simca Heled, David D'or, Erez Ofer, Sergei Krylov, Hagai Shaham, Hillel Zori, Shlomi Shaban, David D'eor and Christine Brewer. She recorded for radio stations including the BBC, CBS, CBC, IBO, WGBH, NRK and GLR.

In 2007, Wolf released a CD titled Impulse.

Since 2007 Wolf conducts over eight concert lectures series, where the main one is held at the Tel Aviv Museum of Art, named On a Personal Note with Orit Wolf. She is also an artistic director of concert series in the Israel Museum, Jerusalem Theatre, Haifa Museum, Beer Sheva, Ashdod, Nahariya, Kfar Yona, Raanana and Kfar Shmaryahu. In 2008 she was appointed the ARAM award by the Royal Academy of Music and In 2019, she received the Rozenblum Prize for her distinctive contribution to the music world by the Tel Aviv Municipality.

Wolf gave a TEDx talk titled "Play the Keynote of your Life".

Wolf is also a business consultant in the area of innovative thinking and creative marketing. In 2010, The Marker Magazine featured her as one of the "hundred most influential people of the year".

In 2022, Wolf was appointed Artist in Campus by the Technion. In 2025, she was awarded the title 'Chevalier de l'Ordre des Arts et des Lettres' by the Ministry of Culture of France as well as appointed as Associate Professor of Creative Arts at the Technion.

As a poet, Wolf published two poetry volumes: "Love in B Minor" (2021) and "Poems in C Major" (2024).

== Compositions and Transcriptions ==
- Associations from Liszt for piano, 1990
- Memories from a Temple for piano solo, 1994
- Prelude and Fugue for piano, 1995
- Nostalgia from Grandfather for piano, 1997
- Kol Nidrei for piano, 2000
- Association from Liszt for viola, clarinet and piano, 2001
- Ben Haim/Orit Wolf: Lullaby (transcription) for violin, clarinet and piano, 2002
- Human’s Love for violin and piano, 2003
- Cadenza for Mozart’s piano concerto no. 23 KV 488, 2005
- White, Light and Argaman for orchestra, 2006 (premiered by the Rishon Lezziyon Symphony Orchestra in 2006)
- Introspection for violin and piano, 2007
- Longings for piano, 2007
- Completion of Mozart’s Fantasy in D minor, K. 397, 2019
- Memories from Turkey, Solo Piano, 2021
- Transcriptions for Yossi Banai Songs, 2017
- Transcriptions for Elvis Presley & Frank Sinatra Songs, 2020
- Transcriptions for David De'or Songs, 2020
- Stillness, Solo Piano, 2025
- Silent Butterfly, Solo Piano, 2026
- Morning Bells, Solo Piano, 2026
- Passing Light, Solo Piano, 2026.
