= Odradek Records =

American cooperative record label

- Founded: 2012
- Founder: John Anderson
- Status: Active
- Genre: classical music
- Country of origin: United States
- Official website: Odradek Records web site

Odradek Records is a cooperative, non-profit record label that releases recordings of classical music.

== History ==
Odradek Records, based in the United States, was founded by John Anderson in 2012 as an artist-controlled label for performers wishing to release recordings with more freedom than with other labels. Designed according to the model of peer-reviewed scientific journals, Odradek Records allows submissions from any performer, and these submissions are evaluated by other professionals. The founder, John Anderson, described this process: "Artists are chosen anonymously based solely on a demo recording by a committee of myself and four others, who rotate year to year." In 2014, the label launched the open-access online blind team judging platform Anonymuze.com, and since then all applications to the label have been processed through this platform. In 2015, the label opened a jazz imprint, followed by a world imprint in 2018.

Odradek owns and operates ODRATEK BV, based in the Netherlands, a holding company for several digital startups and the European branch for the label's investments and management structure. ODRATEK is the majority stakeholder in the creative marketing company vist.co kulturmanagement GmbH (The Visual Storytelling Company) based in Hamburg, Germany. ODRATEK is dedicated to promoting and sustaining cultural heritage with apps and software, which include the biography platform B.io and Neumz, the world's first complete recording of all Gregorian chants presented alongside scores, texts, and translations.

Since 2017, Odradek Records also organizes concerts for its music association in its Italian studio "The Spheres" to showcase its artists.

Odradek Records takes its name from a mythical creature in Franz Kafka's story "The Cares of a Family Man."

== Artists and composers ==
Odradek Records focuses on classical, jazz, and world music.

Piano

- Michele Campanella
- Muriel Chemin
- Domenico Codispoti
- Mei Yi Foo
- Vittorio Forte
- Stefano Travaglini
- Massimiliano Coclite
- François-Frédéric Guy
- Alexander Lonquich
- Pina Napolitano
- Javier Negrín
- Artur Pizarro
- Josu de Solaun Soto
- Rinaldo Zhok
- Francisco Manuel Soriano

Violin

- Johannes Fleischmann
- Franco Mezzena
- Franziska Pietsch
- Yury Revich

Viola

- Jesus Rodolfo
- Krzysztof Komendarek-Tymendorf

Cello

- Adolfo Gutiérrez Arenas
- Yuko Miyagawa

Double Bass

- Gary Peacock

Soprano

- Chen Reiss
- Maija Kovaļevska
- Natalia Labourdette

Mezzo- soprano

- Helena Ressurreiçao

Baritone

- Paul Armin Edelmann
- Will Liverman

Bass-Baritone

- Egils Siliņš

Choir

- State Choir Latvija

Ensembles

- Trio Agora
- Trio Delta
- Drumming Grupo de Percussão
- Carion Wind Quintet
- Ensemble Linea
- Lutosławski Quartet
- Mediva

Conductors

- Atvars Lakstīgala
- Thomas Rösner
- Andris Poga

Orchestras

- Bamberg Symphony
- Beethoven Philharmonie
- Colibrì Ensemble
- Gulbenkian Orchestra
- Latvian National Symphony Orchestra
- Liepāja Symphony Orchestra
- Lithuanian Chamber Orchestra
- Lithuanian National Symphony Orchestra
- Pärnu City Orchestra
- Real Filarmónica de Galicia
- Seattle Symphony

Composers

- Lera Auerbach
- Arno Babajanian
- Rodolphe Bruneau-Boulmier
- Stefano Travaglini
- Elliott Carter
- Unsuk Chin
- Hugh Collins Rice
- Hugues Dufourt
- Aurélien Dumont
- Dai Fujikura
- Sofia Gubaidulina
- Toshio Hosokawa
- Charles Ives
- Giya Kancheli
- Leon Kirchner
- Thomas Kotcheff
- György Kurtág
- Ramon Lazkano
- Jesús García Leoz
- György Ligeti
- Silvan Loher
- Tigran Mansurian
- Szilárd Mezei
- Akira Miyoshi
- Eric Moe
- Marc Monnet
- Jeffrey Mumford
- Akira Nishimura
- Arnold Schoenberg
- Alfred Schnittke
- Yoichi Sugiyama
- Yūji Takahashi
- Luís Tinoco
- Mikel Urquiza
- Pēteris Vasks
- Anton Webern
- Joji Yuasa

== Economic model ==
As a non-profit record label, Odradek Records co-invests 50% of project costs and keeps only enough money from sales to cover expenses, passing on all profits to the performers. Odradek Records provides access to their recording studio for all recordings.

== See also ==
- List of record labels
