= Inés Medina-Fernández =

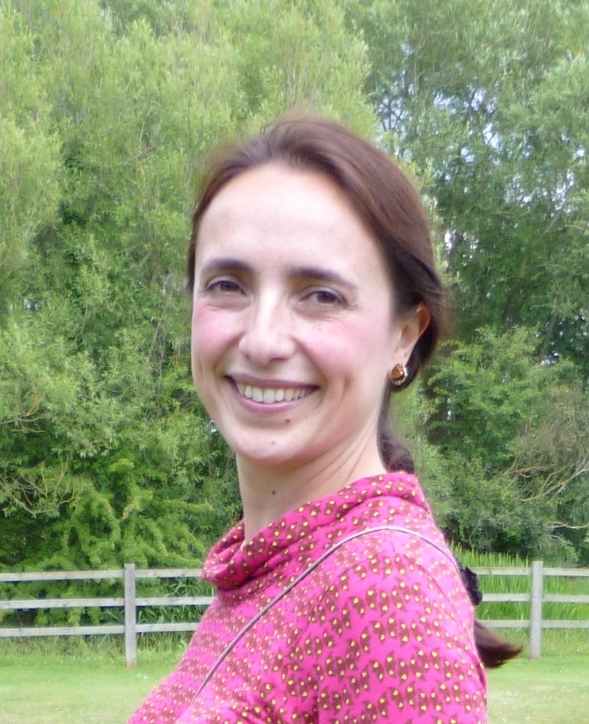

Background information
- Born: 8 February 1974; Madrid, Spain
- Genres: Documentary & film, contemporary classical, Baroque, Spanish
- Instrument(s): piano, keyboards, percussion, vocals

Inés Medina-Fernández (born February 8, 1974) is a pianist and composer of contemporary classical music. She began playing piano at the age of 8, completing examinations at the Madrid Royal Conservatory. An experienced pianist and self-taught composer, her compositions draw upon many influences - from Baroque to John Cage, to film and documentary music, for example. She explores composition for a variety of instruments, and has composed not only for piano but also for horn and classical guitar. Her love of film music has led to collaborations with producers and directors. Medina-Fernández also enjoys working with musicians interested in premiering her pieces.

Medina-Fernández' music is difficult to define. It is multi-layered and uses tones and patterns in creative and original structures, hinting at medieval and baroque although clearly contemporary.

== Biography ==
Born and raised in Madrid, Spain, she studied physics there until 1994, when she moved to Canterbury, England. She obtained a bachelor's degree in Physics with Astrophysics at the University of Kent in 1998 then lived in Ghent, Belgium, until 2000.

Taking every opportunity to learn musical composition, she attended many Early Music concerts with her then-partner Jan Van den Bossche (later director of the Utrecht Music Festival). Medina-Fernández moved to Amsterdam where she commenced a part-time career in science publishing with Elsevier. She continued to participate in the Early Music scene deriving from the Utrecht Music Festival.

In 2004 she moved to Oxford, England, and worked for several leading science publishers, including Elsevier, Wiley-Blackwell and Atlantis Press. At this time she started studying composition in earnest. Amongst others, she read everything by Arnold Schoenberg and sought guidance from composer colleagues. Medina-Fernández attended the Composers' Workshop at the Department for Continuing Education, University of Oxford, under Jonathan Darnborough. She also attended Composer's Workshops at the Faculty of Music under, amongst others, Martyn Harry and Joanna MacGregor.

During Summer 2015 Medina-Fernández began collaborating with veteran composer and blues performer Chris Gibbons.

Fascinated by Arvo Pärt, Satie, Debussy, Thomas Newman, John Cage, Mussorgsky, Rameau, Jeff Beal, Schoenberg and Chopin, and inspired by luminaries like Joanna MacGregor, Medina-Fernández began to turn her compositional notions into reality.

Her influences are very diverse and sometimes difficult to identify. Some of her compositions have for example been compared to santur music. The above composers are all major influences, however there are others relevant to Medina-Fernández's development, such as certain lyrical pieces by Led Zeppelin, Hildegard Von Bingen, and much of opera.

=== Compositions ===
Medina-Fernández's first fully-fledged compositions were completed in 2009 - three pieces for horn, piano and violin entitled Conversation - and were recorded with musicians from Oxford University. These pieces represent conversations taking place between the instruments as if they were friends conversing.

In 2010 she completed another three pieces, this time for piano called, Lluvia de Perlas, Mosaic and The Dome. Lluvia de Perlas was inspired by the baroque masters. Mosaic was inspired by the experience of looking at a Gaudi work in Barcelona, and reflecting that one might either focus upon the minutiae of individual features, or on the totality of the image. The Dome was inspired by the grandeur of Dresden's Frauenkirche. These pieces were recorded in April 2011 and were submitted to Oxford Contemporary Music.

In 2011, Medina-Fernández collaborated with the Oxford Guitar Ensemble - a quartet of classical guitars - and created a composition for them entitled Danza, which was premiered by them at a concert on May 27, 2011, at Somerville College, Oxford, and thereafter again at St John's College on June 1, 2011. Danza, again, has a complex and lyrical structure that surprises and entices.

In 2016 Danza was added as background to the Circulo de Bellas Artes' television documentary Javier Manterola: El oficio de Ingeniero.

From 2011 to the present Medina-Fernández completed several new pieces including Evidence of Design (minimal and dissonant in character), Meditation, and GraveMente, which explores the deep resonant sounds of the piano.

=== The future ===
- Internet and television documentaries.
- Medina-Fernández is currently working on a Chinese Song Cycle based upon the poems of T'ang poet Po Chü-i and inspired partly by popular Chinese folk tunes played upon the two-thousand-year-old pipa, or Chinese lute. She finds Chinese poetry delicate yet forceful, and a compelling subject matter for a composition.
- A composition with question-answer structure, inspired by and superimposed over whale song.
- Composing for orchestra.

== Genres ==
Contemporary classical music
