= Volker Giencke =

Austrian architect (born 1947)

- Born: 27 June 1947 (age 78); Wolfsberg, Carinthia
- Occupation: Architect

Volker Giencke (born 27 June 1947) in Wolfsberg is an Austrian architect.

Volker Giencke studied architecture and philosophy in Graz and Vienna. Collaborated with Merete Mattern, the landscape-architect Raimund Herms and Günther Domenig. Opened Giencke & Company architectural office in Graz in 1981, as well as offices in Seville in 1990 and Riga in 2004.

Professor for Architectural Design at the Institute of Design, University of Innsbruck, since 1992, where he founded ./studio3 - the Institute for Experimental Architecture in 2000.

International teaching assignments and lectures: Davenport Professor at the Yale School of Architecture/New Haven, External Examiner at the University College London - Bartlett School of Architecture, at the Rizvi College Bombay and at the Universidad de Buenos Aires.

== Memberships ==
Volker Giencke is Member of the Austrian Society of Fine Arts, of the Austrian Architectural Society, the Association of Austrian Architects, Honorary Member of the Union of German Architects BDA, Member of the Association of Latvian Architects, Foundation Member of the Lightacademy Bartenbach at the University of Innsbruck, Member of the European Academy of Science and Art.

== Awards ==
Josef Frank Prize, Friedrich Zotter Memorial Award, prizewinner of the Shinkenshiku Residential Design Competition /Tokyo, Austrian National Housing Design Award, Constructec Prize /Hannover, "Mensch-im-Raum" Prize, Prize of the ZV (Central Association of Austrian Architects) 1987, 1991, 1994 and 1998. Architecture Prize of Styria 1987 and 1998, Architectural Prize of Mecklenburg-Vorpommern, Architectural Award of Carinthia 1991 and 2000, Dedalo Minosse International Prize Vicenza 2002 + 2006 + 2017; Geramb-Rose, Award for emerging architecture, 2007 Fischer-von-Erlach Prize, 2016 Latvian Architecture Award, 2016 American Architecture Prize, 2016 Chicago Athenaeum - International Architecture Award, A+Award Winner - New York, 2016 European Concrete Award 2nd prize - Rome, International Award for Facade Engineering Excellence - London, Idea-Tops Award - Shenzhen, 2017 Tiroler Landespreis für Kunst[1], 2018 Grand Prix "Glass in Architecture - Moscow.

== Exhibitions ==
Personal exhibitions in the Forum Stadtpark Graz 1976, Liederhalle Stuttgart 1979, Künstlerhaus Graz 1981, Steirischer Herbst 1984, Biennale de Paris 1985, Academy of Arts Berlin, 1989, Expo '92 Seville, Biennale di Venezia 1992 + 93, Haus der Architektur Graz 1989, 1992 + 1994; Treiber Museum Graz 1998; travelling exhibition Brussels - New York - Los Angeles - Sydney - Berlin - Vienna etc., NYAA New York Academy of Art 1999, Museum van Hedendaagse Kunst Antwerp 1999, Kunsthaus Mürzzuschlag 2002, RIBA Royal Institute of British Architects 2002, Architectural Biennale Venice 2004, Basilica Palladiana Vicenza - Dedalo-Minosse 2006, Architekturzentrum Wien (AZW) “Architektur in Österreich im 20. u. 21. Jhdt.” 2006, Kunsthaus Graz: “M-City” 2006, AUT Innsbruck „Genius Loci“ 2007, Deutsches Architekturzentrum Berlin (DAZ) „ Sense of Architecture“ 2007, Napoleonstadel Kärnten Architektur-TRANSFER 2008, "Process" - current projects Arsenale Riga 2008, “Architecture as a space of music - Sense of Architecture” – Architectural Biennale in Venice 2008, Solo exhibition "Volker Giencke" aut 2015, Architecture Biennale Venice 2018 - Palazzo Bembo.

== Selected projects ==
- 1975 Multipurspose-Hall Gunther Domenig /Volker Giencke, Graz
- 1977 Dockyard "Wörthersee", Günther Domenig / Volker Giencke, Klagenfurt
- 1981 Student-housing Lendplatz, Graz
- 1982 School on the hillside, Kumberg/Austria
- 1984 "Red Stage" Graz
- 1985 "Maxonus", Graz
- 1985 House Dr. Benedek, Graz
- 1987 Administration building Porsche, Salzburg
- 1988 "Indianer" - exhibition, Graz
- 1991 National archive, Klagenfurt
- 1992 Hospital Hartberg
- 1992 Gymnasium Johannes Kepler in Graz
- 1992 Austrian Pavilion, Expo 92, Seville
- 1992 Odörfer, Exhibition-, Office and Administration Building, Klagenfurt
- 1992 Church of Aigen, Ennstal/Austria
- 1992 Austrian Cultural Institut, NY
- 1993 Students-housing Innsbruck
- 1993 Atelier Schönbrunngasse, Graz
- 1993 Museum of Contemporary Art, Helsinki
- 1994 Housing "Carl-Spitzweg-Gasse", Graz
- 1995 Glasshouses for the Botanical Garden - University of Graz
- 1996 Hypo-Bank Headquarter, Klagenfurt
- 1997 Costantini Museum, Buenos Aires
- 1997 Hotel "Speicher Barth", Baltic Sea
- 1998 Rhodarium Bremen
- 1999 "Mega-Baumax" Klagenfurt
- 1999 Music Center Helsinki
- 2000 Oper Oslo
- 2001 VOEST - "Future & Steel", Linz
- 2001 Abbey of Seckau - adaptation & extension of the Romanesque monastery-komplex
- 2002 Hospital Bregenz
- 2002 Mozarteum Salzburg
- 2003 Light-academy Bartenbach - University of Innsbruck
- 2002 Congress-Center Pardatschgrat, Tyrol
- 2004 Hybrid-City-House Graz
- 2005 Academy of Mariazell, Austria
- 2006 Hotel Elisabeth, Ischgl/Tyrol
- 2007 New Riga City Center
- 2007 Mangalsala - Future Development of the Island, Riga
- 2011 Museum of Contemporary Art Taipei
- 2012 Casas Activas
- 2013 360° Jakomini, Graz
- 2014 Baltic Thermal Pool, Liepaja/Latvia
- 2014 House of Music, Innsbruck
- 2015 "A part of Speech" - room-installation aut, Innsbruck
- 2015 GREAT AMBER Concert Hall Liepaja/Latvia
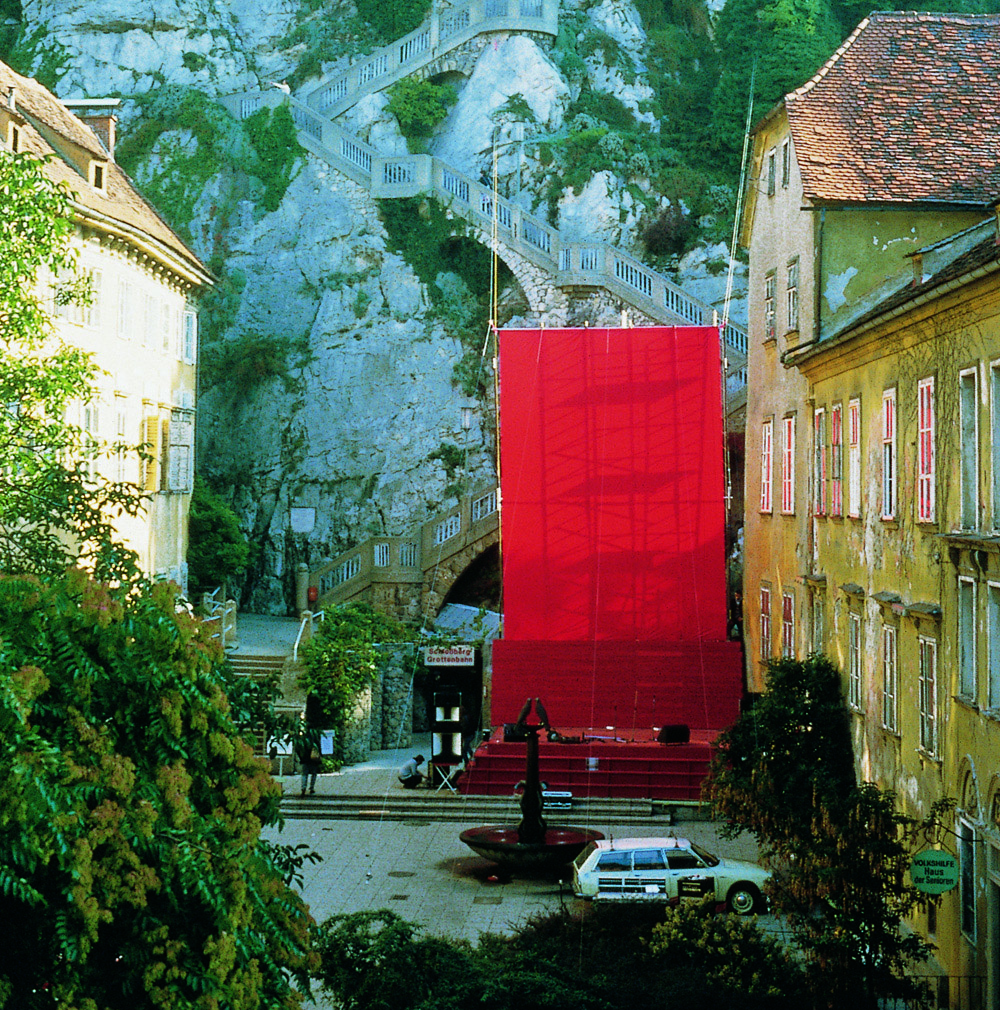
Red Stage

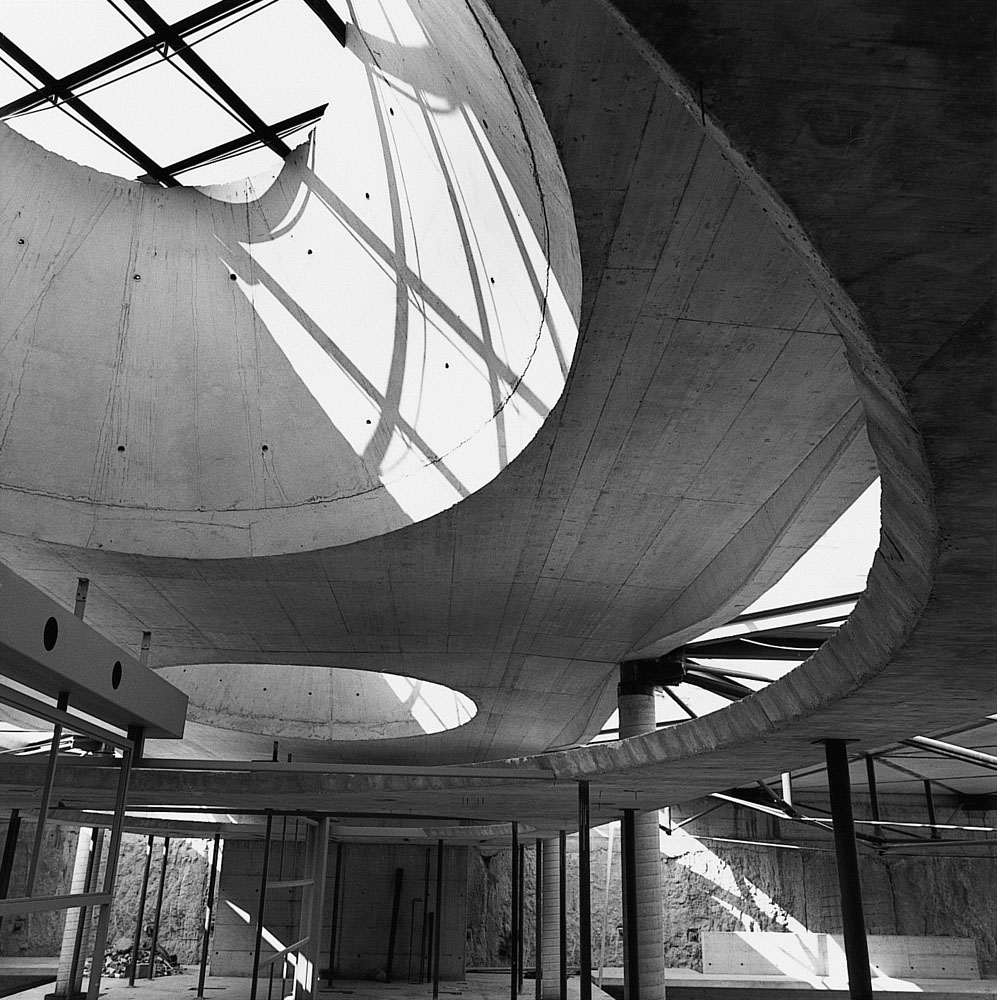
Gymnasium Johannes Kepler

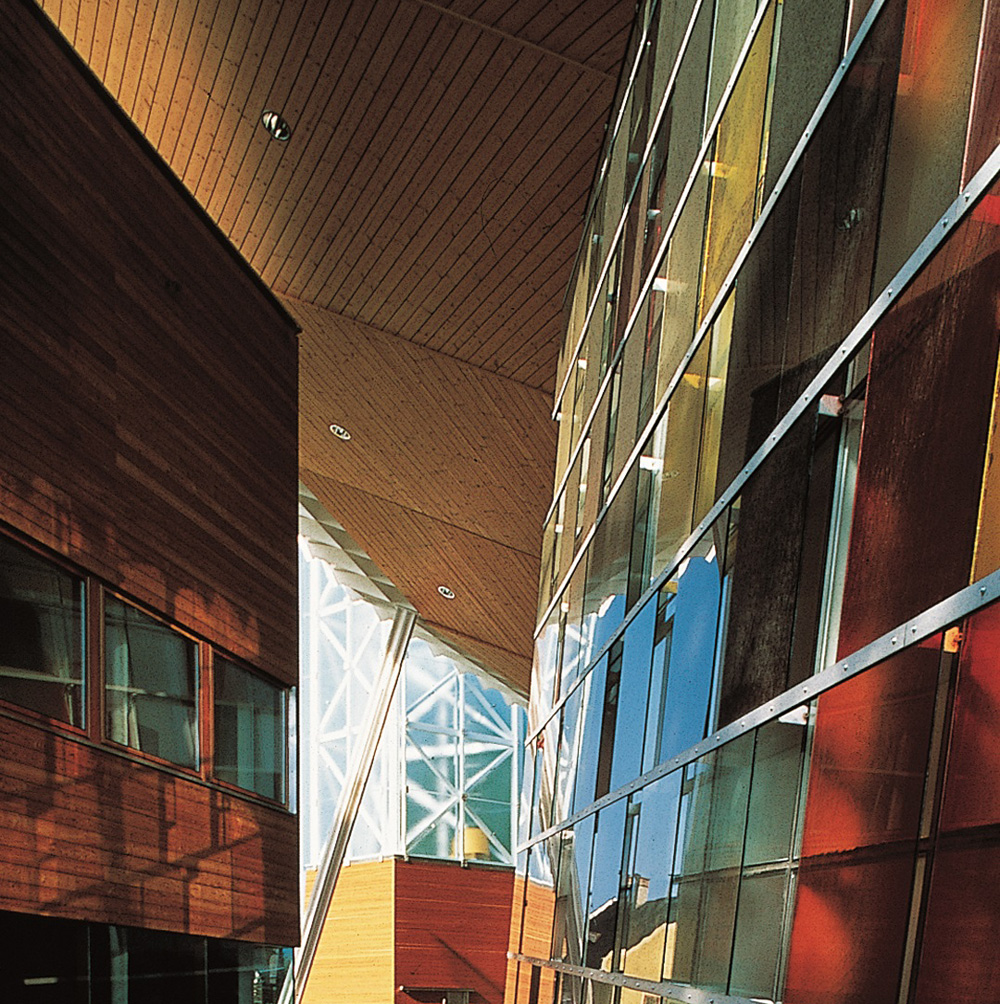
Church of Aigen

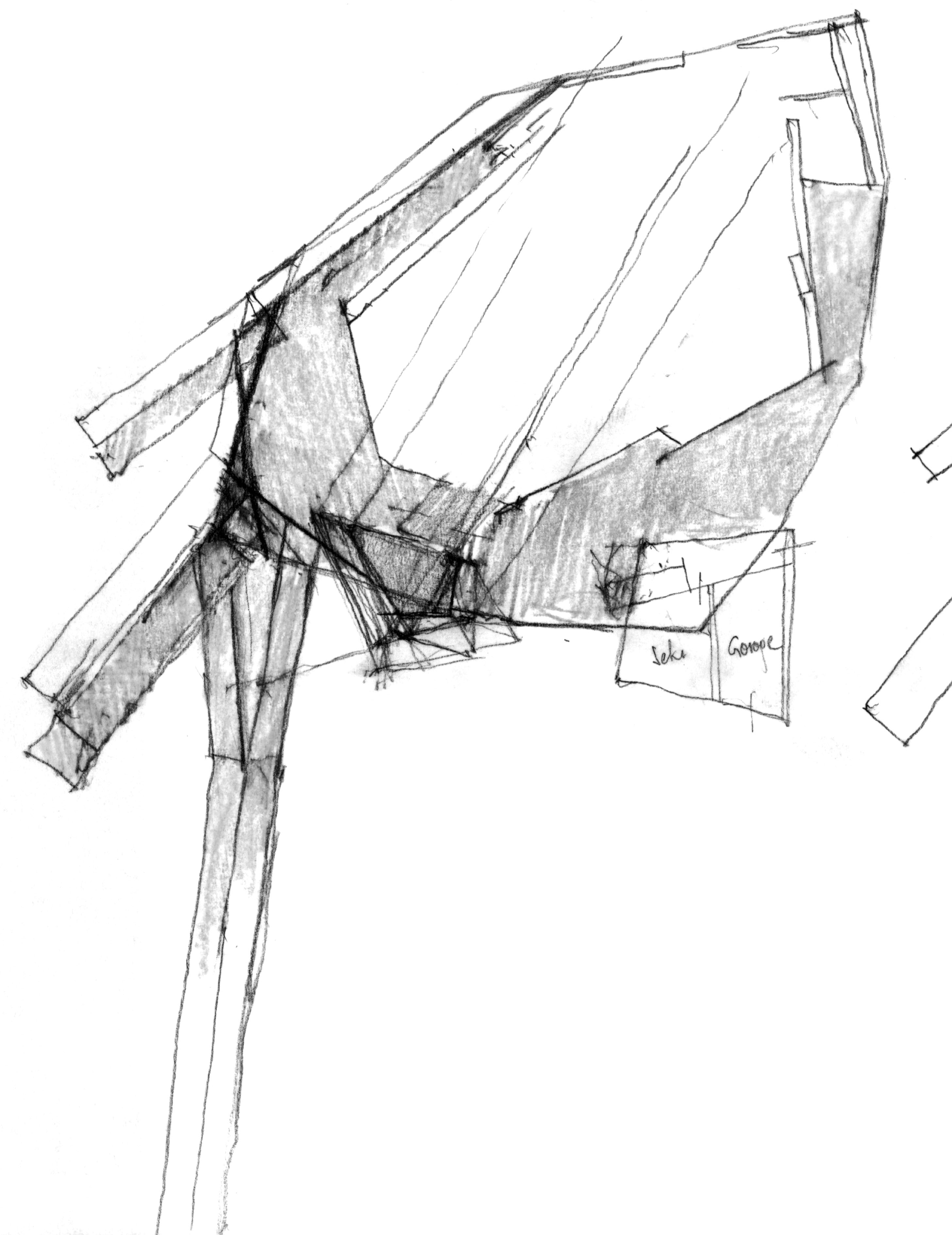
Church of Aigen - Sketch Horizontal Section

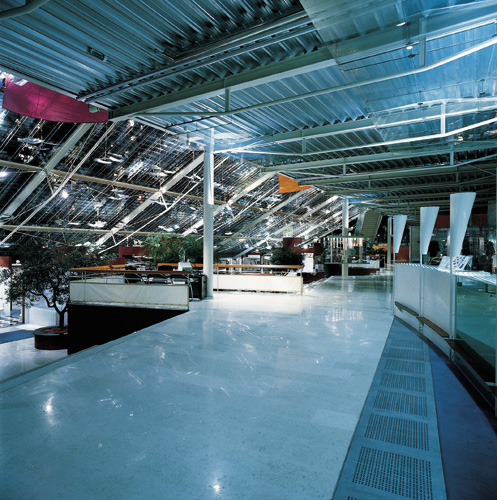
Odörfer

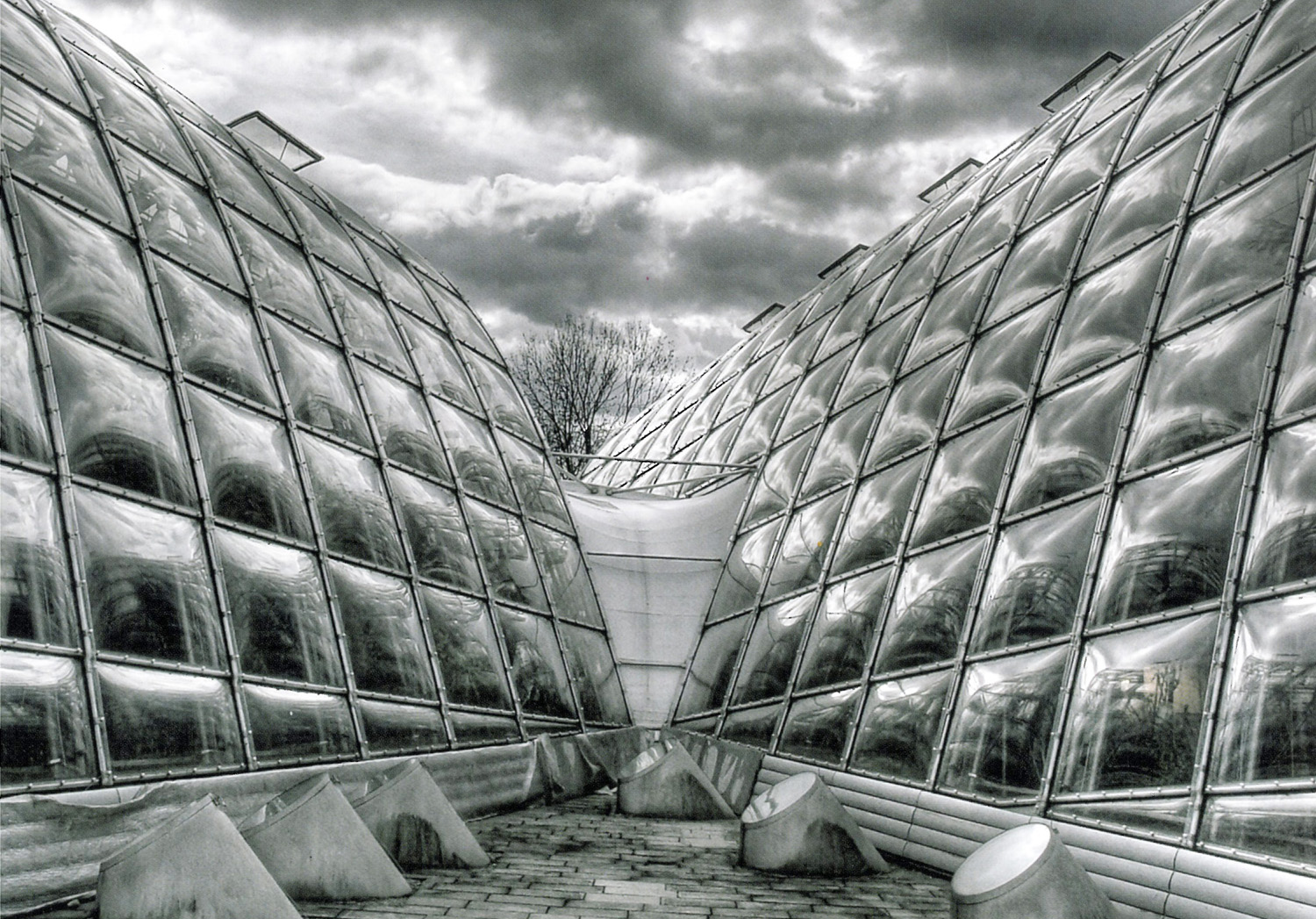
Glass Houses for the Botanical Garden

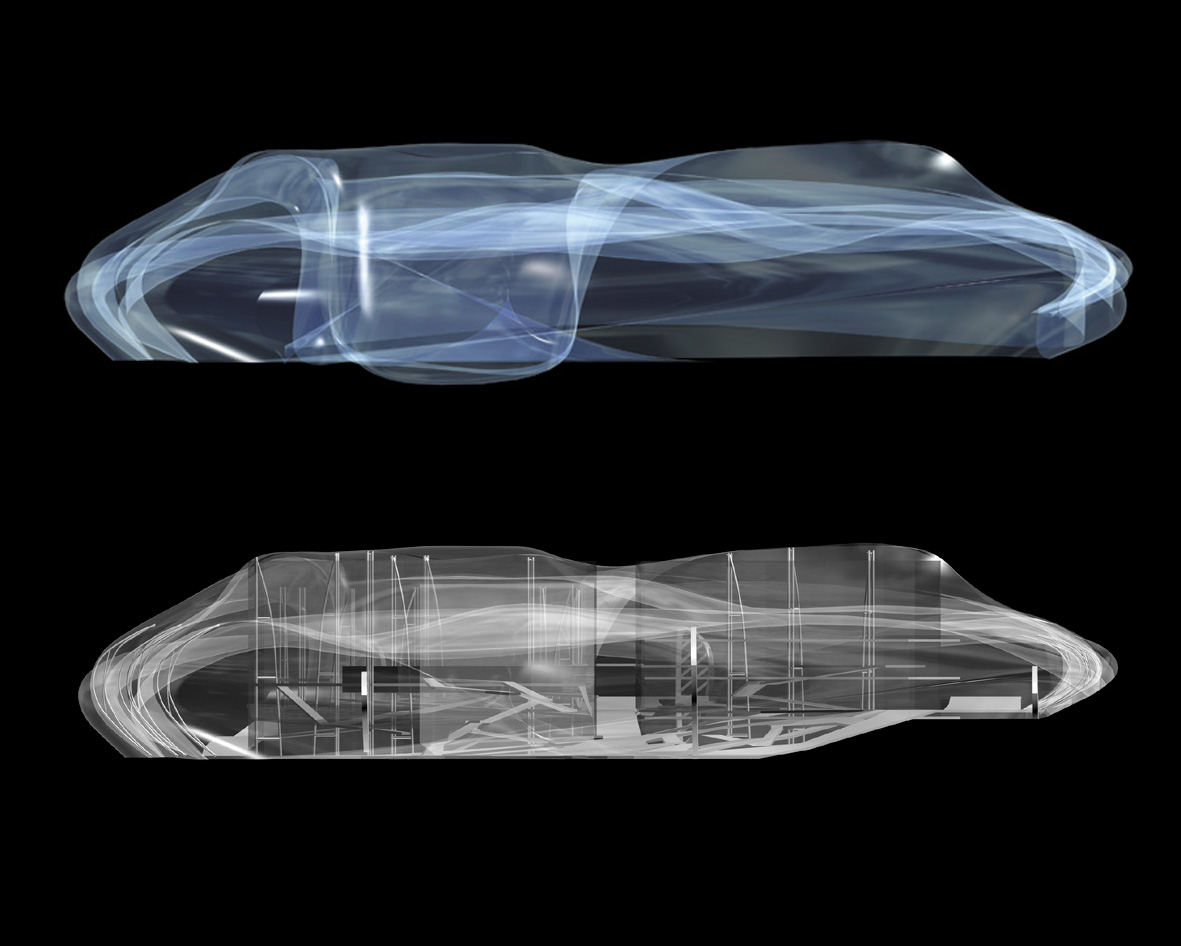
Rhodarium Bremen

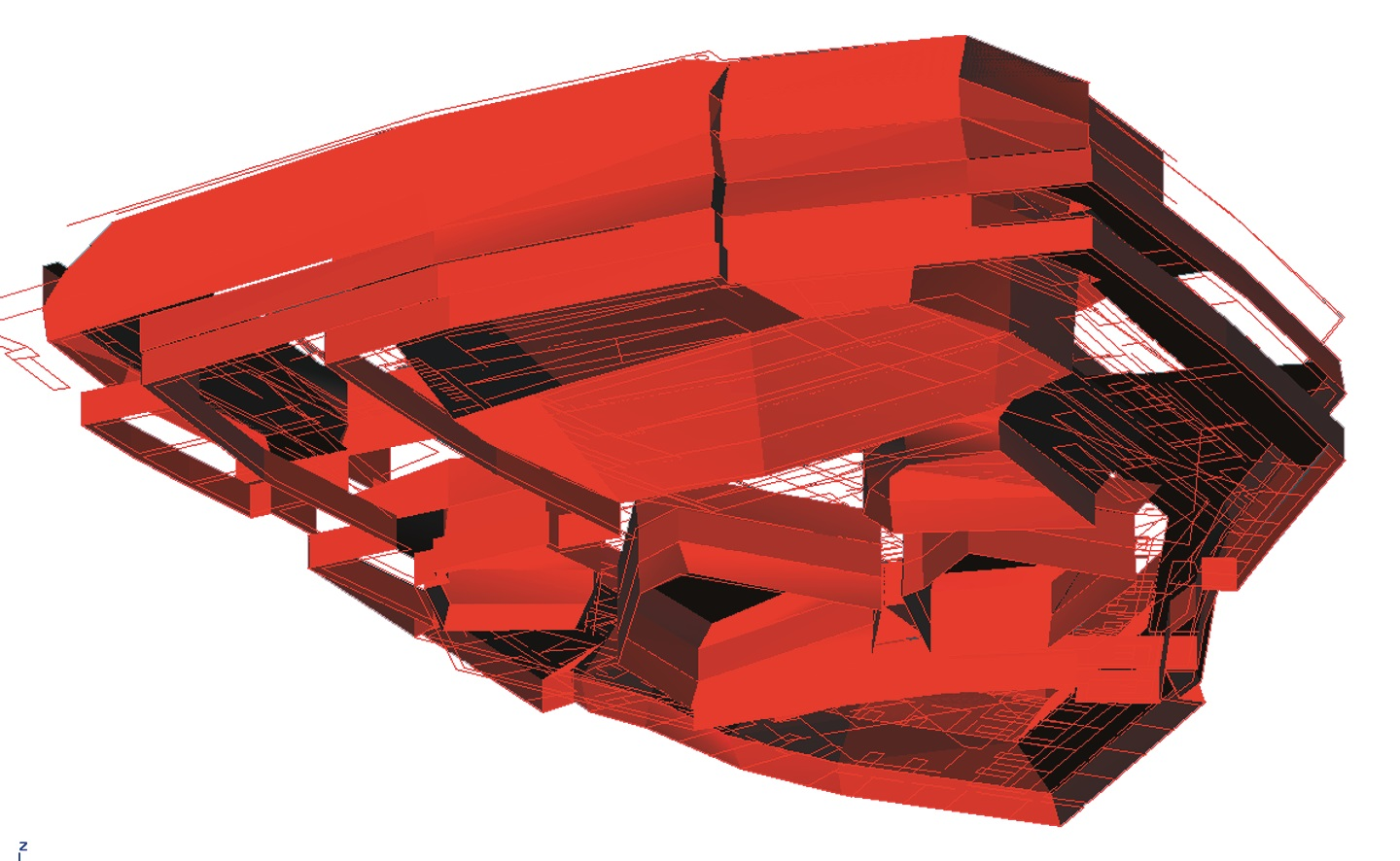
Music Center Helsinki

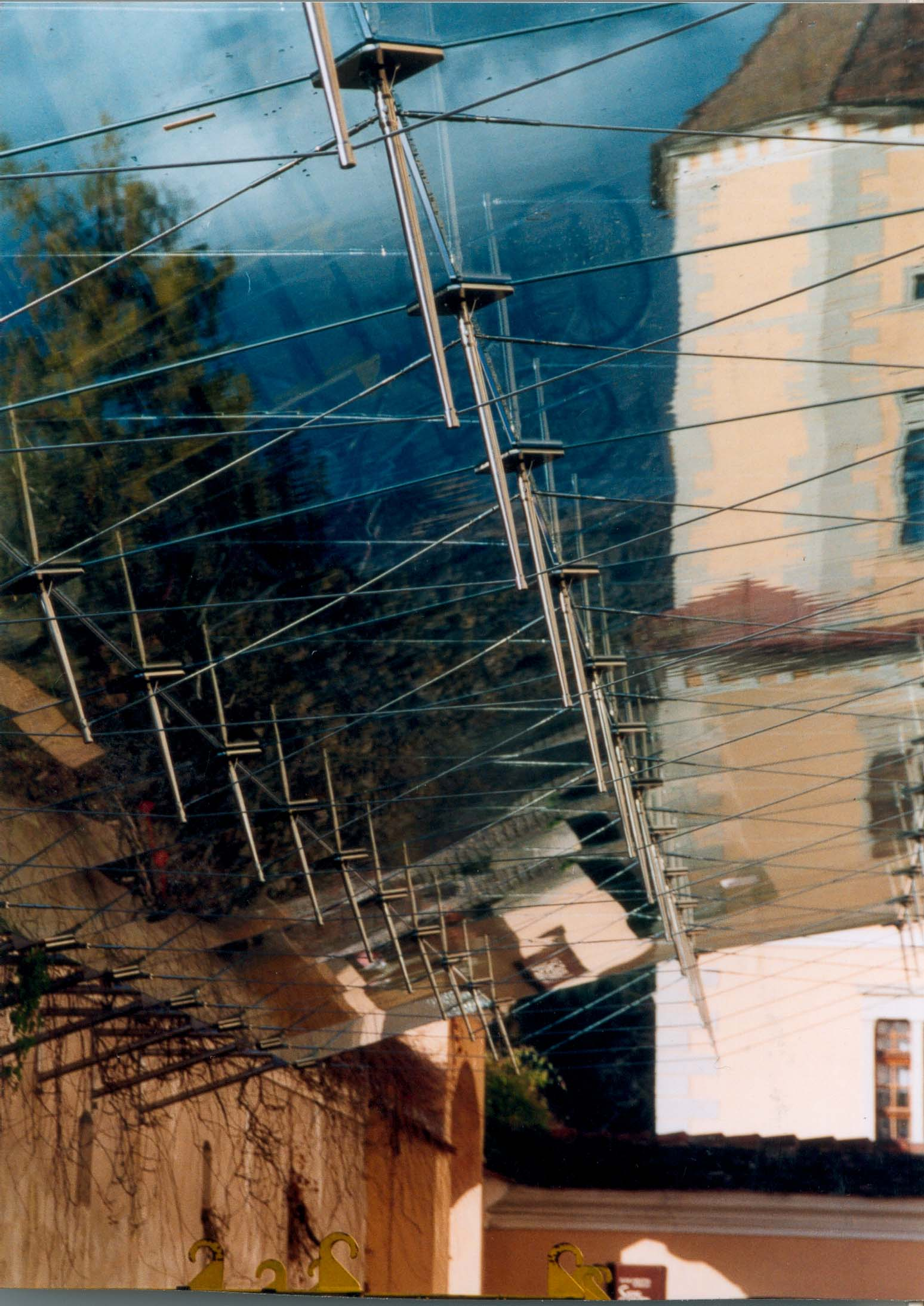
Abbey of Seckau - glass roof

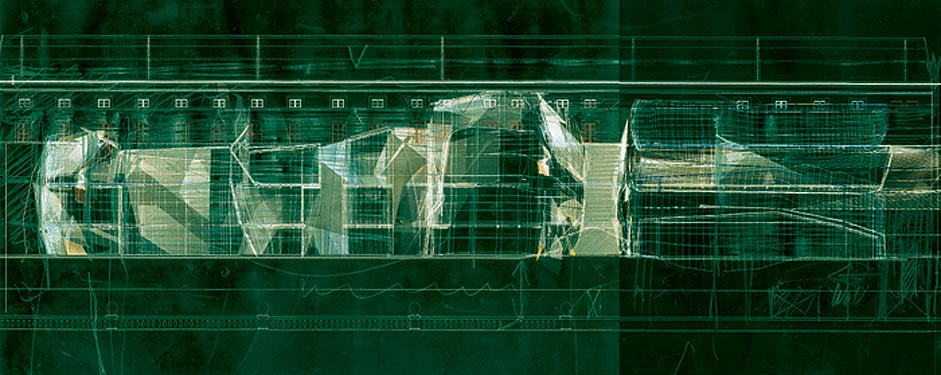
Mozarteum Salzburg

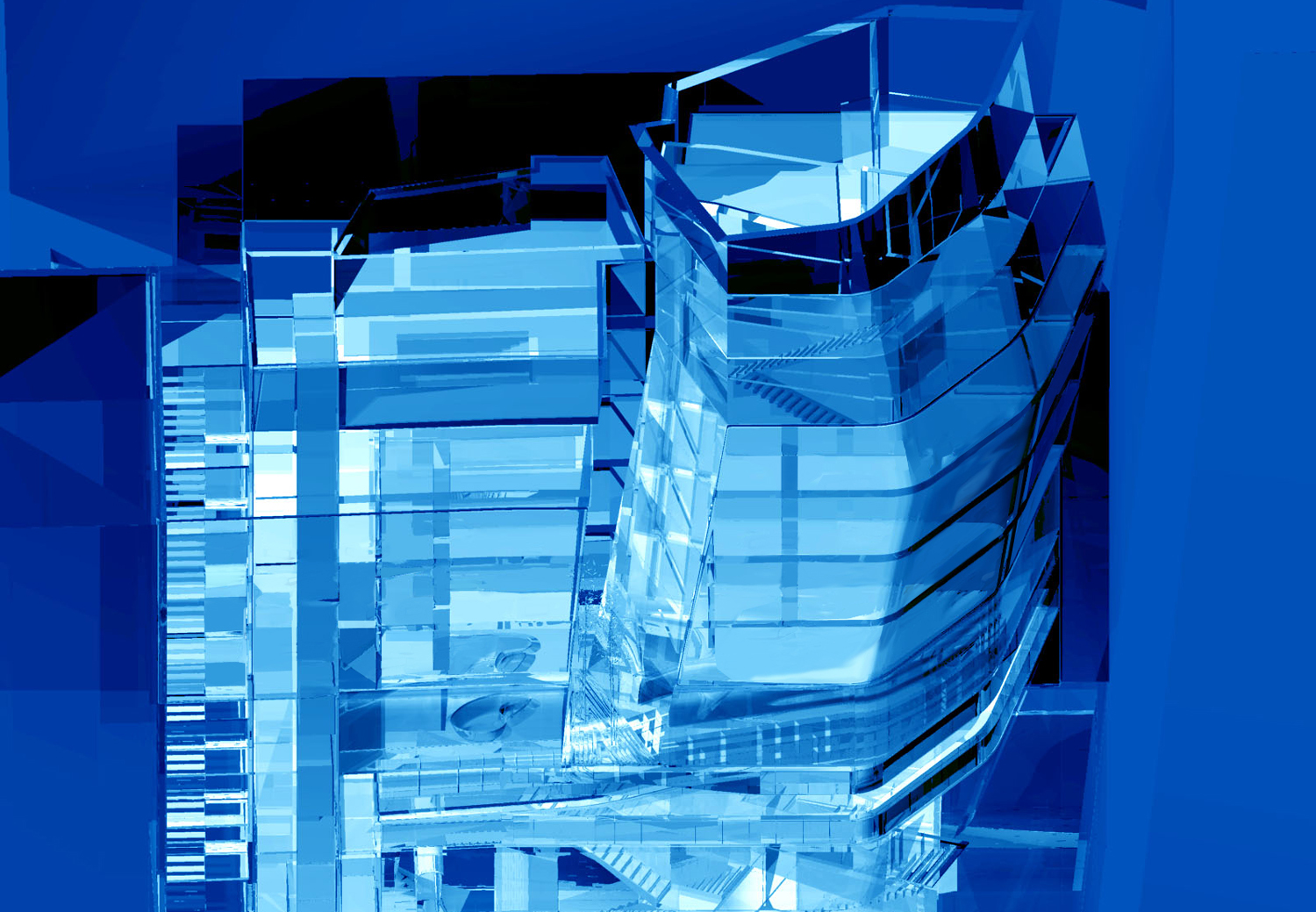
Hybrid-City-House Graz

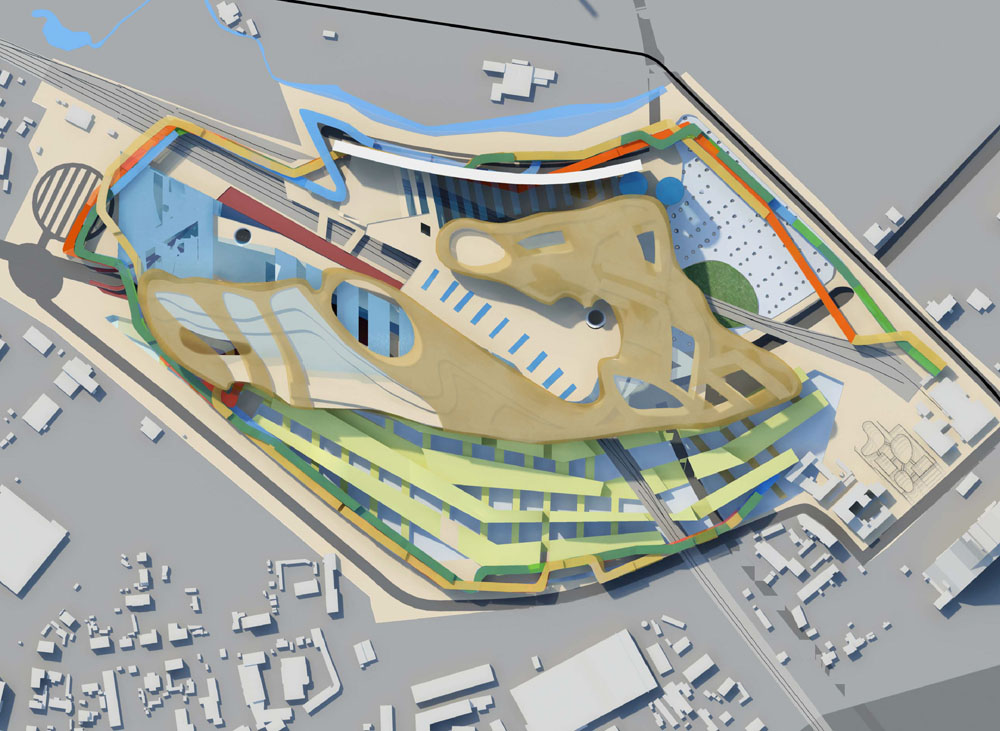
New Riga City Center

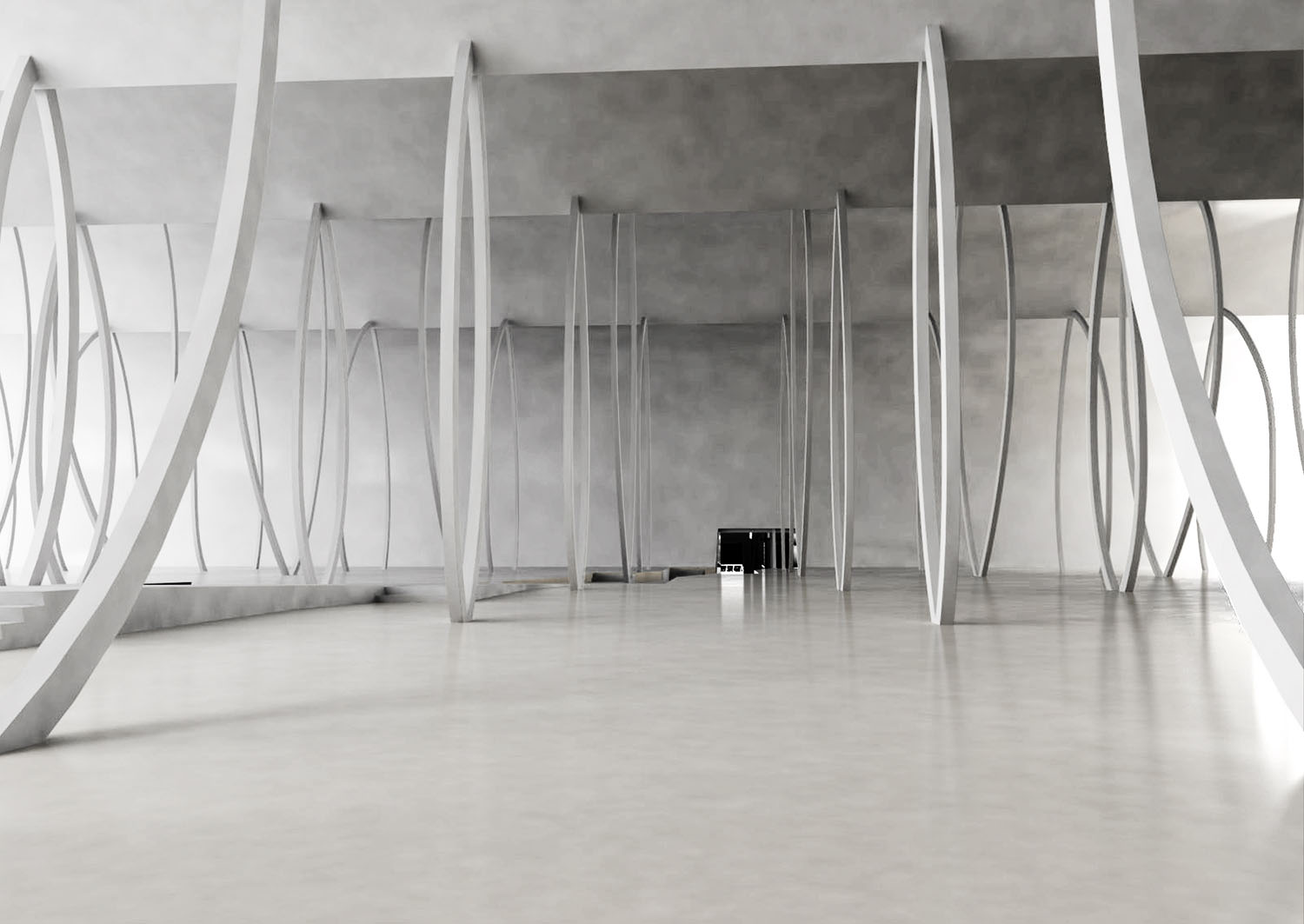
Museum of Modern Art

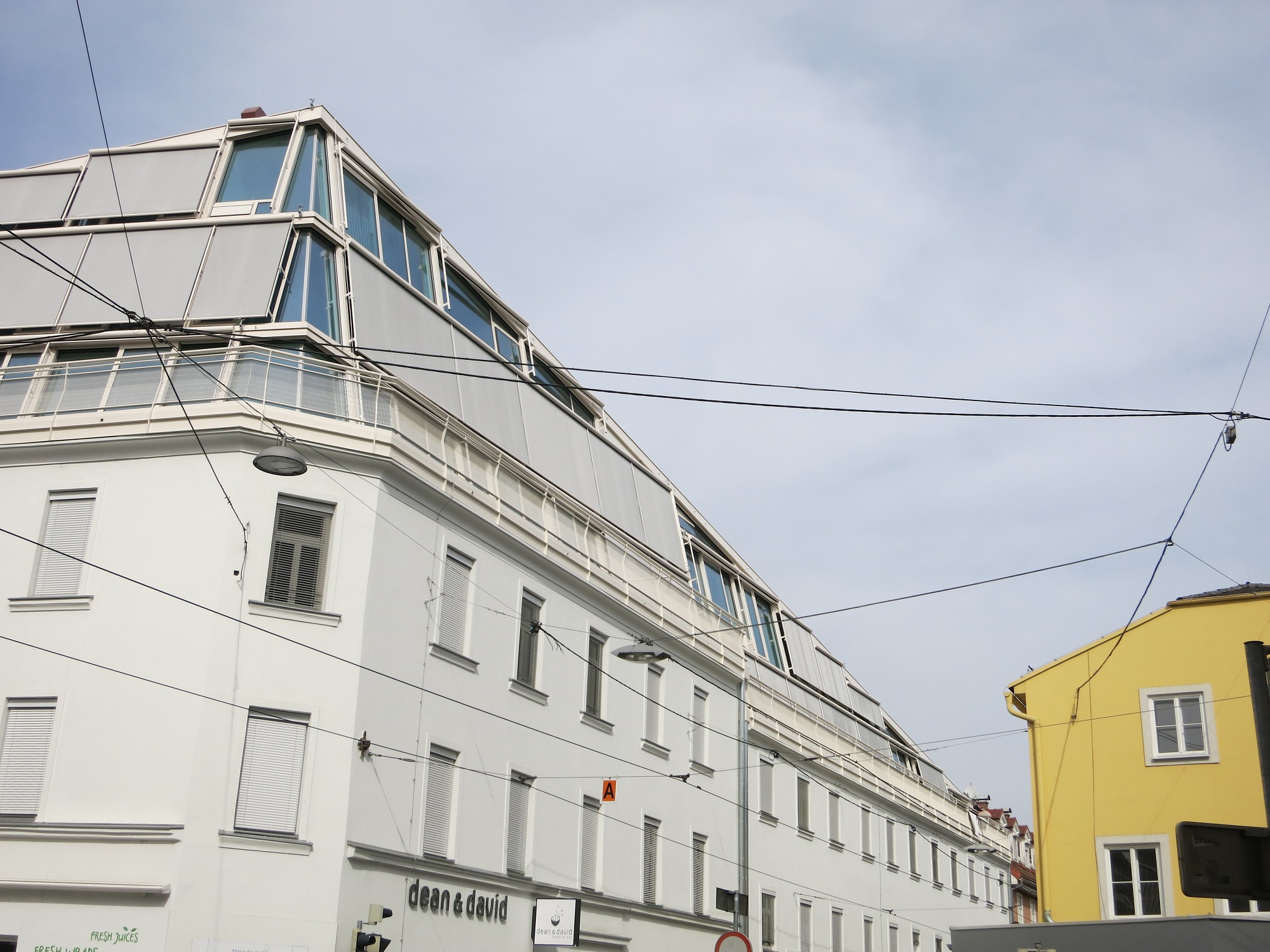
360° Jakomini

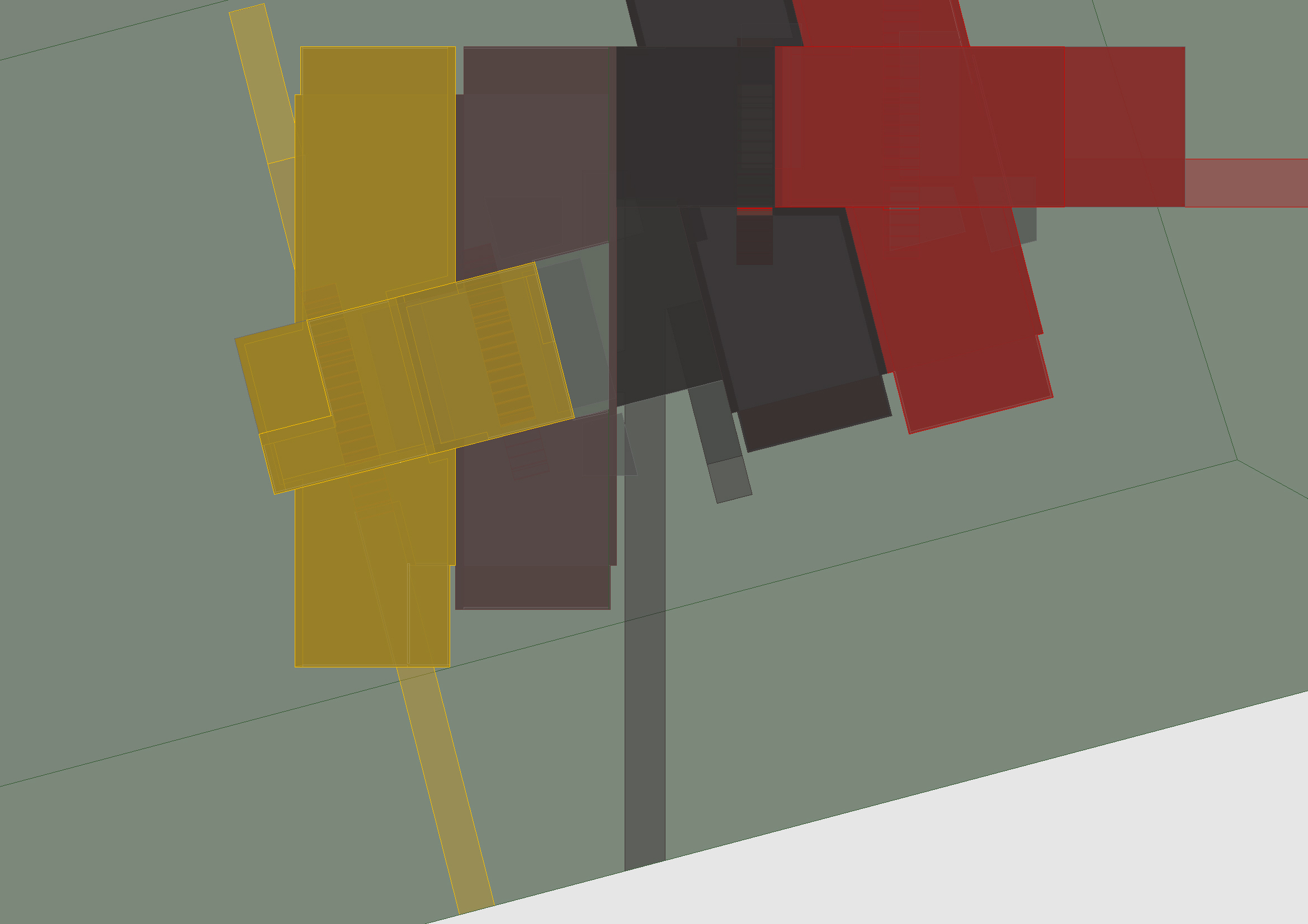
Casas Activas

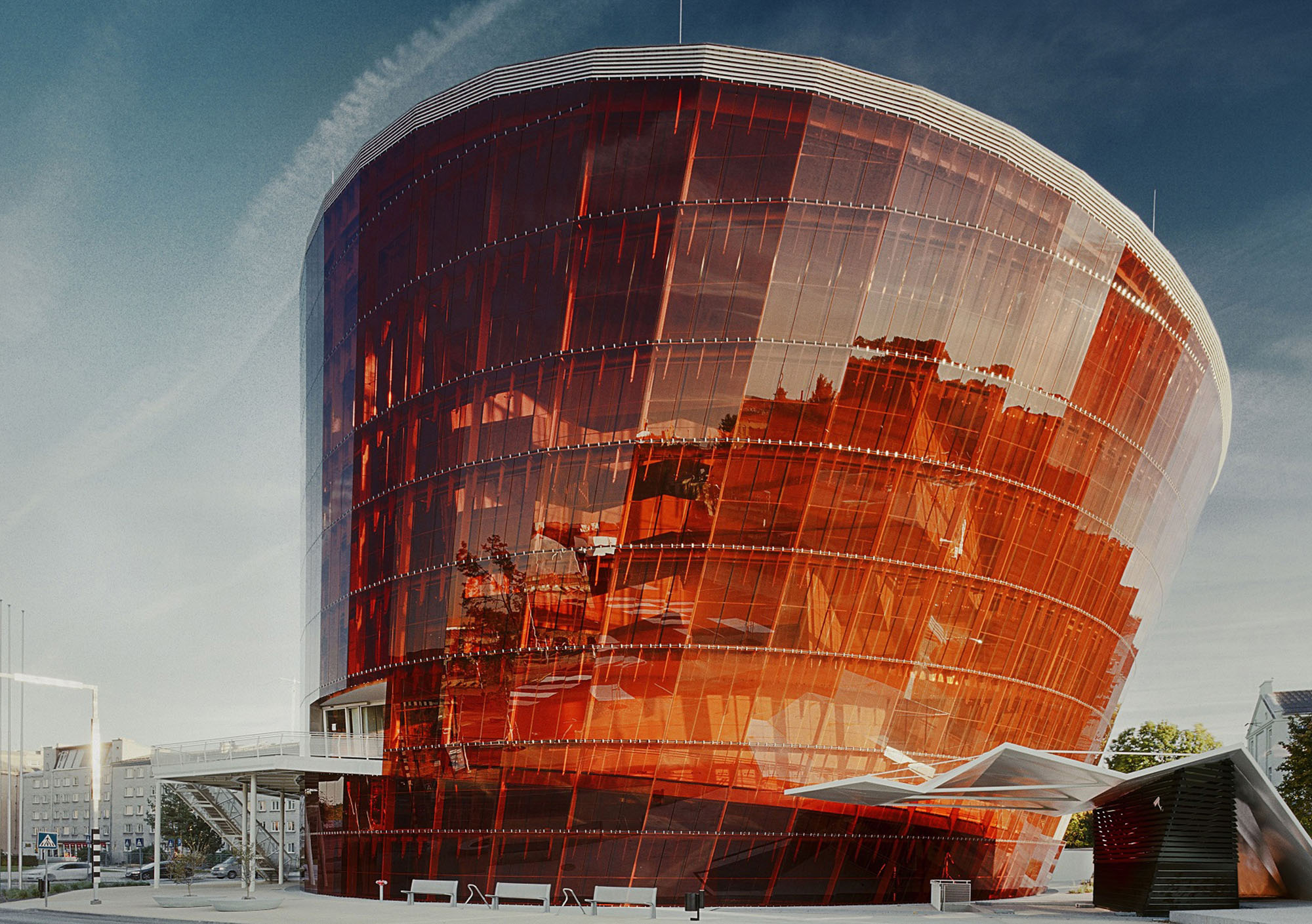
Great Amber - Concert Hall Liepaja

== Selected publications ==
- Volker Giencke - Tangible Utopia, Booklet - Architecture Biennale Venice 2018
- Time-Space-Existence, European Cultural Center, Architecture Biennial Venice 2018;
- Tangible Utopias - 15 years ./studio 3; Publ.: University of Innsbruck, ./studio 3 - Institute for Experimental Architecture, ISBN 978-3-200-03879-0
- Masterpieces: Performance Architecture + Design, Giant Amber- Concert Hall Liepaja, Braun Publishing AG, ISBN 978-3-03768-042-1
- "Metamorph" Architecture Biennale Venice "Trajectories - Concert Halls", Fondazione La Biennale di Venezia, Ca`Giustinian, San Marco 1364/a I-30124 Venezia, ISBN 88-317-8533-8
- The Organic Approach to Architecture; Deborah Gans, Zehra Kuz - Pratt Institute /New York, John Wiley & Sons Ltd., ISBN 978-0470847916
- The Ethical Function of Architecture; Karsten Harries; The MIT Press - Massachusetts Institute of Technology/USA, ISBN 0-262-08252-7
- "Achtung Architektur"; Eeva Liisa Pelkonen; The MIT Press - Massachusetts Institute of Technology/USA, ISBN 0-262-16159-1
- "Achtung Architektur"; Eeva Liisa Pelkonen; Ritter-Verlag, ISBN 978-3-85415-185-2
- Volker Giencke: Projekte. Projects. With an essay by Roger Connah, German/English, Springer, Vienna New York 2001, ISBN 3-211-83554-7.
- The Power of Contemporary Architecture; Peter Cook und Neil Spiller; Publ.: Academy editions Great Britain, ISBN 0-471-98419-1, John Wiley & Sons Ltd.
- The World of Contemporary Architecture; Könemann Verlagges.m.b.H; ISBN 3-8290-3564-0
- Europe, the Contemporary Architecture Guide Vol.2; Masayuki Fuchigami, Publ.: TOTO Shuppan/Japan, ISBN 4-88706-184-6
- Architecture in Austria, a survey of the 20th century; Publ.: Birkhäuser Verlag, ISBN 3-7643-6031-3
- Dialogues in Time; Peter Blundell Jones; "Haus der Architektur Graz"; ISBN 3-901174-36-2
- Architecture as Commitment - Styrian Architecture 1986–1992, Publ.: "Haus der Architektur Graz", ISBN 3-901174-09-5
- New Spirit in Architecture; Peter Cook & Rosie Llewellyn-Jones; Publ. - Rizzoli New York, ISBN 0-8478-1263-4, 0-8478-1264-2
