= Liepāja Symphony Orchestra =

Latvian orchestra

- Orchestra
- Native name: Liepājas Simfoniskais Orķestris
- Founded: 1881
- Location: Liepāja, Latvia
- Concert hall: Great Amber Concert Hall
- Principal conductor: Gintaras Rinkevicius
- Concertmaster: Līga Baltābola
- Website: lso.lv

Liepāja Symphony Orchestra (LSO; Latvian: Liepājas Simfoniskais Orķestris) is the oldest orchestra in the Baltic States.

== History ==
It was started in 1881, when the first Philharmonic in the Baltics was established. After the World War II orchestra re-commenced its work in 1947, under the wing of the Music School of Liepāja, led by the director of the music school for many years – Valdis Vikmanis. A new chapter in the history of orchestra started at the very end of 1986, when orchestra was granted the status of a professional symphony orchestra, and became the second professional symphony orchestra in Latvia. For many years its artistic director was Imants Resnis (1992–2009), for several seasons it was Atvars Lakstīgala who worked with the orchestra (2009–2016), but since 2017 the artistic director and chief conductor of the Liepāja Symphony Orchestra is Gintaras Rinkevicius (Lithuania).

Since 2015 home of the orchestra is the new concert hall of Liepāja - the "Great Amber". The 24th Liepaja International Stars Festival took place for the first time on 5 March 2016 at the Great Amber Concert Hall, featuring Matthias Manasi, the Amal Duo (Bishara Haroni and Yaron Kohlberg) and the Liepāja Symphony Orchestra.

== Performances ==
In the repertoire politics special attention is paid to Latvian music – the orchestra has repeatedly premiered and commissioned new works. In recent seasons all the 12 monumental opuses of Liepaja concert series initiated by LSO have been submitted to public and specialist evaluation. They have been released by such record labels as “Odradek Records”, “Toccata Classics” and “Skani”. Orchestra has two times received the highest national music award – The Great Music Award, as well as numerous Latvian Recordings Awards.
