= Peter Diamond (disambiguation) =

Peter Diamond (born 1940) is an American economist.

Peter Diamond may also refer to:

- Peter Diamond (actor) (1929–2004), British actor
- Peter Diamond, a fictional British police detective in a series of novels by Peter Lovesey

== See also ==
- Peter Diamand (1913–1998), arts administrator
