= Rustem Hayroudinoff =

Russian pianist

Rustem Hayroudinoff (Russian: Рустем Афзалович Хайрутдинов) is a Russian concert pianist. His father, Afzal Hayroudinoff is a professor of Cello at the Kazan State Conservatory. His sister, Halida Hayrutdinova, is also an acclaimed concert pianist.

Rustem Hayroudinoff graduated from the Moscow Conservatory, where he studied with Lev Naumov, and received his postgraduate degree (DipRAM) at the Royal Academy of Music in London with Christopher Elton. He was the first student from Soviet Union to come to study at the Royal Academy, where he is now a professor of Piano.

His performances have been broadcast on major classical radio stations around the world and has appeared in the documentary “The Unknown Shostakovich” alongside Vladimir Ashkenazy, Valery Gergiev and Maxim Shostakovich. He has recorded CDs for various labels including Chandos, Decca and NAMI. His recordings of Shostakovich's Theatre Music and the Dvořák Piano Concerto with the BBC Philharmonic were selected amongst the Best CDs of the Year by BBC Music and the Gramophone magazines respectively. His CD of the Rachmaninoff Complete Preludes was selected by Classic FM Magazine as a part of the ‘four discs essential Rachmaninoff collection’, alongside the recordings of Arthur Rubinstein and André Previn, and his recording of the Complete Etudes-Tableaux by Rachmaninoff became the Instrumental Choice of the Month with the BBC Music Magazine and was nominated for the BBC Music Magazine Best Instrumental CD of the Year Award. It was also selected as the finest version of these pieces on BBC Radio 3's Building a Library (programme presenter David Nice).

Hayroudinoff has suffered, and recovered, from focal dystonia.

== Discography ==
- Rachmaninov Sonatas Nos 1 & 2 (ONYX4181)
- Rachmaninov Complete Etudes-Tableaux (Chandos CHAN10391)
- Dvořák Piano Concerto (Chandos CHAN10309)
- Shostakovich Symphony No 4 arranged for 2 Pianos, with Colin Stone (Chandos CHAN10296)
- Rachmaninov Works for Cello and Piano, with Alexander Ivashkin (Chandos CHAN10095)
- Rachmaninov 24 Preludes (Chandos CHAN10107)
- Shostakovich Theatre Music (Chandos CHAN9907)
- An Equal Music-Music from the Novel (Decca 466945–2)
- Rachmaninov, Schubert, Strauss, Chopin (ConAnima)

== See also ==
- List of Tatars

== External links and references ==
- Vanity Fair
- Personal web page
- Evening Kazan newspaper (in Russian)
- Today's Zaman. Turkish newspaper, retrieved on October 24, 2007 (in English)
