= Halida Dinova =

Russian classical pianist

- Born: Halida Khayrutdinova; Kazan, Tartarstan, Russia
- Education: Kazan Conservatory; Saint Petersburg Conservatory; Cleveland Institute of Music
- Occupation: Concert pianist
- Relatives: Rustem Hayroudinoff (sister)
- Musical career
- Genres: Classical

Halida Khayrutdinova, known professionally as Halida Dinova, is a Russian concert pianist.

== Biography ==
Dinova was born in Kazan, Russia. Her father, Afzal Khayrutdinov, was a professor of cello at the Kazan State Conservatory and her mother, Flora Khayrutdinova (MD), was her first music instructor. She is sister to concert pianist Rustem Hayroudinoff, who is also a professor at the Royal Academy in London. Dinova graduated from the Kazan State Conservatory (Academy), where she studied with Natalia Fomina, and received her postgraduate degree in solo piano performance with Anatol Ugorski (in a study period called aspirantura for performers) at the Saint Petersburg State Conservatory (Academy). Immediately after graduating from the conservatory, she taught full-time for four years at the Kazan State Conservatory, in the departments of Solo Piano Performance and Chamber Music.

Dinova holds an Artist Diploma from the Cleveland Institute of Music, where her primary performance area was Piano (under Paul Schenly) and Secondary Organ (under Adeline Huss).

Dinova is married and divides her time between the US and Russia. Her performances have been broadcast on classical stations around the world and she has appeared in the award-winning documentary directed by Laura Paglin, Shadow of the Swan – A Composer Story, alongside the American composer Dennis Eberhard, the St. Petersburg State Capella Symphony Orchestra, the conductor Alexander Chernushenko and the families of the men who perished in Kursk submarine disaster in the year 2000.

Dinova is a Steinway Artist who has recorded CDs for various record labels, including Doremi, Chandos, Naxos and Cantius Classics.

== Discography ==
- 1998: Halida Dinova Plays Scriabin (Doremi DDR 71133)
- 2000: Brahms: Piano Concerto No. 2; 8 Piano Pieces, Op. 76 (CC 101) – with the Saint Petersburg Academic Symphony Orchestra conducted by Gustavo Plis-Sterenberg
- 2003: Ernest Bloch: Concerto Symphonique; Scherzo Fantasque; Hiver-Printemps (Chandos 10085)
- 2004: Dennis Eberhard: Piano Concerto "Shadow of the Swan"; Prometheus Wept (Naxos 8559176)
- Masterpieces for Children by Bach, Debussy, Schostakovich, Tchaikovsky (CC 102)
- Music that Tells Stories – Sait-Saens, Wagner, Scriabin, Tchaikovsky, Balakirev, Bloch (CC 104)
