= Stefano Travaglini =

Italian jazz pianist and composer

- Stefano Travaglini performing at the piano

Background information
- Genres: Jazz, free improvisation
- Occupations: Pianist, composer
- Instrument: Piano
- Website: www.stefanotravaglini.com

Stefano Travaglini (born in San Benedetto del Tronto, Italy) is an Italian jazz pianist and composer. His recordings include the solo piano albums Ellipse (2017) and Monk – Fifteen Piano Reflections (2020), and duo projects with Massimiliano Coclite and Achille Succi. His work has been discussed by jazz critics in All About Jazz, Jazz Journal and other specialist publications.

== Career ==
In collaboration with Hungarian singer Fatime Halmos, Travaglini developed The Hungarian Songbook, a project centred on the reinterpretation of traditional Hungarian folk melodies through vocal performance and improvised piano accompaniment. Drawing on the musical traditions of Hungary and the Carpathian Basin, the project presented traditional folk repertoire in a contemporary improvisational setting. The duo released an album of the same name in 2013 on Terre Sommerse Records, with the patronage of the Hungarian Academy in Rome, associated with the Balassi Institute.

In the album's liner notes, Hungarian music historian Attila Retkes discussed the musical traditions of the Carpathian Basin and the relationship between Hungarian folk music, classical composition and jazz improvisation.

In 2017, Travaglini released Ellipse, a solo piano album recorded in September 2016 at Rainbow Studio in Oslo with recording engineer Jan Erik Kongshaug. The album combines improvisations with interpretations of compositions by Thelonious Monk and other composers. Reviewing the recording for All About Jazz, Karl Ackermann noted the coexistence of abstraction and lyricism in Travaglini's playing and described the improvised passages as having a coherent musical structure despite their spontaneous creation.

In 2019, Travaglini and pianist Massimiliano Coclite released the two-piano album The Long Line on Odradek Records. The project explores the relationship between composition and improvisation through an approach the musicians describe as "instant composition". Rather than following a fully notated score, they use musical, verbal or graphic indications that provide a framework for the development of a performance. The album draws on music by John Bull, Paul Hindemith, Igor Stravinsky and Aaron Copland, and includes a reinterpretation of the jazz standard "Body and Soul". Six free improvisations take their titles from the elements of tragedy discussed in Aristotle's Poetics. In the album's liner notes, British music critic Barry Witherden discussed the musicians' close interaction and their use of ideas drawn from both jazz and classical music.

His 2020 solo album Monk – Fifteen Piano Reflections consists of fifteen interpretations of compositions by Thelonious Monk. Travaglini's arrangements depart at times from Monk's characteristic percussive piano style, reworking melodic, harmonic and contrapuntal elements of the original pieces. In the accompanying liner notes, jazz writer Thomas Cunniffe discussed this approach in relation to individual compositions, including "Trinkle Tinkle", "Ruby, My Dear" and "Brilliant Corners". The album was reviewed by Gareth Thomas in the British magazine Jazz Journal, who also discussed Travaglini's departure from Monk's original playing style.

In 2022, Travaglini released the duo album Book of Innocence with saxophonist and bass clarinetist Achille Succi. The recording consists predominantly of Travaglini's compositions and improvisations, with references to painting and literature. "Rothko" takes its inspiration from the painter Mark Rothko, while "Bauci" refers to Italo Calvino's novel Invisible Cities. The closing title track is associated with Henri Matisse's painting The Red Studio and brings together musical material developed in shorter compositions. In the album's liner notes, Karl Ackermann discussed the relationship between the duo's musical interaction and the visual arts. The album was also reviewed by the music magazine Textura.

In July 2012, Travaglini accompanied theatre director Giorgio Barberio Corsetti on piano in readings from Commedia at the opening of the I Cantieri dell'Immaginario festival in L'Aquila. The performance took place in a square temporarily reopened to the public following the 2009 L'Aquila earthquake.

Travaglini teaches music theory, rhythm and aural skills, including ear training, at the Francesco Venezze Conservatory of Music in Rovigo, Italy.

== Compositions and collaborations ==
Travaglini composed the music for "You Are on My Mind", with lyrics by Hungarian jazz singer Klára Hajdu. The song appeared on Hajdu's 2020 album Journey and was performed at the Budapest Jazz Club in October 2020. The album was nominated for the 2021 Fonogram Award in the Hungarian Jazz Album of the Year category.

In 2021, Travaglini won the first Giovanni Canciani International Piano Composition Competition with Luminescence, passacaglia for piano.

In 2025, four of Travaglini's compositions—"The Room Before", "Migrations", "The Sun Comes to Me" and "Skvala"—were released on pianist Michele Francesconi's album Seasons (Three Suites for Piano Trio) on Caligola Records.

== Critical reception ==
Writing for All About Jazz, Karl Ackermann reviewed Ellipse in December 2017, discussing its mixture of abstraction and lyricism. Matt Hooke described the recording as "a masterwork of improvised music" in a March 2018 review. Dan McClenaghan also reviewed the album, emphasizing its links to European classical music and its solo-piano improvisations.

Reviewing Ellipse for Jazz Journal in April 2018, Brian Morton described Travaglini as "a wondrously eclectic talent" and observed that his improvisations appeared to develop organically, following their own internal logic.

Reviewing Monk – Fifteen Piano Reflections for JazzTrail in April 2020, Filipe Freitas examined Travaglini's improvisational approach to Monk's compositions, noting the interplay between jazz and modern classical music in his interpretations.

Textura reviewed Book of Innocence, discussing the interplay between Travaglini's piano and Succi's saxophone and bass clarinet.

== Discography ==
=== As leader or co-leader ===
- The Hungarian Songbook (Terre Sommerse, 2013), with Fatime Halmos
- Ellipse (Notami Jazz, 2017)
- The Long Line (Odradek Records, 2019), with Massimiliano Coclite
- Monk – Fifteen Piano Reflections (Notami Jazz, 2020)
- Book of Innocence (Notami Jazz, 2022), with Achille Succi

=== Selected compositions recorded by other artists ===
- "You Are on My Mind" — recorded by Klára Hajdu on Journey (2020)
- "The Room Before", "Migrations", "The Sun Comes to Me", "Skvala" — recorded by Michele Francesconi on Seasons (Caligola Records, 2025)
