= Evelyne Brancart =

American pianist

- Born: Belgium
- Occupations: Pianist and Teacher
- Writing career
- Genre: Classical

Evelyne Brancart is a Belgium-born American pianist. In 1968, she was invited to study in the Chapelle Musicale de la Reine Elisabeth where she became a laureate in 1971. Later, she was awarded a gold medal from the Belgian Government in 1978. She performed throughout Europe, America, Asia and South America, including at London's Wigmore Hall and Queen Elizabeth Hall in 1976, with the BBC Symphony Orchestra, and in 1982 at New York’s Alice Tully Hall. She won prizes at the Queen Elisabeth Piano Competition (1975), Montreal International Piano Competition (1976), Viotti International Piano Competition (1979) and Gina Bachauer International Piano Competition (1986). Brancart also received an ensemble division prize in the ARD International Music Competition (Munich, 1984). Brancart has been a professor of music (piano) at the Jacobs School of Music at Indiana University in Bloomington since 1994; and she served as the piano department chair from 2002 to 2012.

== Background ==
In 1968, Brancart was the youngest musician ever to be invited to study under the patronage of the Queen of Belgium, in the Chapelle Musicale de la Reine Elisabeth where she became a laureate in 1971. Brancart later was awarded the gold medal from the Belgian Government in 1978. She studied for 10 years with the Spanish pianist Eduardo del Pueyo (himself a student of Liszt disciple Marie Jaëll) and later with Maria Curcio, Leon Fleisher and Menahem Pressler.

== Recognition ==
Brancart achieved broad recognition as prizewinner at the Queen Elisabeth Piano Competition (1975), Montreal International Piano Competition (1976), Viotti International Piano Competition (1979) and Gina Bachauer International Piano Competition (1986). Brancart also received an ensemble division prize in the ARD International Music Competition (Munich, 1984).

London debut recitals at Wigmore Hall and Queen Elizabeth Hall in 1976 led to BBC broadcast recitals and engagements with the BBC Symphony Orchestra. Brancart performed a well-received American debut in 1982 (at New York’s Alice Tully Hall), and her career has included recitals and performances throughout Europe, America, Asia and South America. Brancart’s repertoire ranges from Baroque to contemporary composers; she is especially known for performances in the Romantic virtuoso tradition.

== Recordings ==
Recordings include Chopin 24 Etudes (Delos) and the Brahms-Paganini Variations and Liszt-Paganini Etudes (Koch Discover). Brancart's live performance of Mozart's Piano Concerto, K. 467, from the Queen Elisabeth Competition, released by Deutsche Grammophon. She also recorded in collaborative settings for Telefunken and Teldec Records (with Atar Arad, violist) and Boston Records (with cellist Anthony Ross). Chamber music collaborators in concerts settings have included Frederico Agostini, Joshua Bell, Jeremy Denk, Miriam Fried, Steven Isserlis, and Arnold Steinhardt. Brancart was the pianist of the Seraphim Trio in Australia for four years, and performed with the Cleveland, Pacifica and Orion String Quartets.

== Teaching ==
Brancart has performed and taught master classes at summer music festivals internationally including: Aspen Music Festival (Colorado, USA, Bay Chamber (Maine, USA), Close Encounters with Music (Massachusetts, USA), Da Camera Chamber Music and Jazz(Texas, USA), Festival D'Horrues (Belgium), Dublin International Piano Festival (Ireland), Leicester Music Festival](England], Mozart Festival (Lille, France), Norfolk Chamber Music Festival (Connecticut, USA), Orford Music Festival (Quebec, Canada), Ravinia Festival (Illinois, USA), Musique de Chambre de Sainte Petronille (Quebec, Canada), Seattle Chamber Music Festival (Washington, USA), Festival of the Sound (Parry Sound—Ontario, Canada), and Music at the Red Sea (Israel).

Brancart is Professor of Music (Piano) at the Jacobs School of Music at Indiana University in Bloomington since 1994; and additionally served as piano department chair from 2002 to 2012. Her students and mentees include concert artists (Jonathan Biss and Jeremy Denk), competition winners and university piano faculty.

Brancart has created and presented seminars on “The Art of Playing the Piano,” (an integral piano playing/teaching method), “The Hand as a Source of Inspiration" (on the Chopin Etudes), and "Deconstruction for Reconstruction" (reflections on J.S. Bach).
