= Great Amber Concert Hall =

Concert hall in Liepāja, Latvia

Coordinates: 56°30′41″N 21°00′37″E

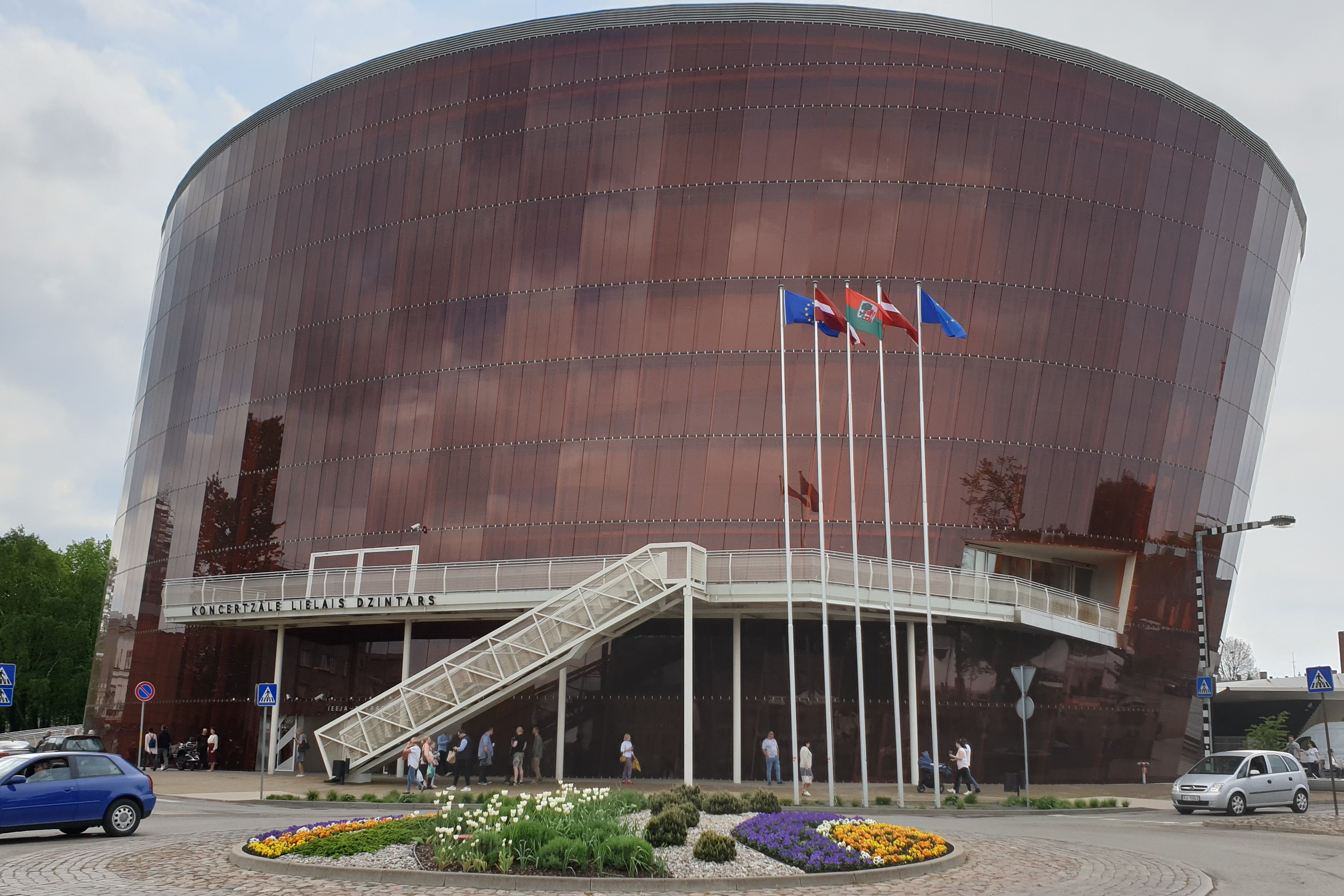
The hall seen from the outside

The Great Amber Concert Hall (Latvian: Koncertzāle "Lielais Dzintars") is a concert hall, cultural and arts centre in Liepāja, Latvia. The building features a cone-shaped structure, enveloped by a tilted glazed facade.

The Liepāja Symphony Orchestra is a resident of the concert hall.

On 5 March 2016 the 24th Liepaja International Stars Festival took place for the first time at the Great Amber Concert Hall, with Matthias Manasi, the Amal Duo (Bishara Haroni and Yaron Kohlberg) and the Liepāja Symphony Orchestra.
