= Christopher Elton =

British piano teacher and professor

Christopher Elton is a British piano teacher, former Head of the Keyboard department of the Royal Academy of Music in London and a professor emeritus of the University of London.

== Biography ==
Christopher Elton was born in Edinburgh and studied at the Royal Academy of Music in London, where he achieved the unusual distinction of gaining the Academy's Dip.RAM, both on piano and cello. After his formal studies he continued his studies with Maria Curcio and was a prizewinner in several British and international piano competitions, and performed both as a soloist and chamber musician. He also freelanced with the major London orchestras playing cello.

Elton has long served as a professor of piano at the Royal Academy of Music, and later as Head of the Keyboard Department. Christopher Elton's students have won international awards, the Long-Thibaud-Crespin Competition, the Montreal International Music Competition, the Van Cliburn and London "World" International Piano Competitions as well as in Jaen, Newport and Dudley. His students include Chih-Han Liu, José Feghali, Orit Wolf, Joanna MacGregor, Jayson Gillham, Freddy Kempf, Amandine Savary, Yevgeny Sudbin, Rustem Hayroudinoff, Mei Yi Foo, Ashley Wass, Jose Manuel Martinez, Helena Ha-Young Sul, Michael Csányi-Wills, Benjamin Grosvenor, and Julian Trevelyan.

He currently resides with his wife, fellow piano teacher Hilary Coates.
