= Mei Yi Foo =

Malaysian pianist

Mei Yi Foo (Chinese: 傅美兒; pinyin: Fù Měi'er; Jyutping: Fu6 Mei5 Ji4; Pe̍h-ōe-jī: Pò͘ Bí-jî, born 1980) is a Malaysian pianist who is currently based in London. She has been taught by musicians such as Yonty Solomon, Chris Elton and Alexander Satz.

She has played at the Royal Festival Hall, Finlandia Hall, Hong Kong City Hall, Wigmore Hall, Verona Filarmonica, Megaron Athens and the Zurich Kammerorchester Haus. Her teachers include Yonty Solomon, Christopher Elton and Alexander Satz at the Royal College and the Royal Academy of Music in London.

She was awarded the Maria Callas Grand Prix in 2008. In 2013, she won the Best Newcomer in the BBC Music Magazine Awards for her début disc, Musical Toys (Odradek Records), which featured works by Sofia Gubaidulina, Unsuk Chin and György Ligeti. Mei Yi was also awarded the medal of Setiawan Tuanku Muhriz in 2011.

== Early life ==
Born in Seremban, Negri Sembilan, Malaysia, Foo began music lessons at the age of four. After her early education at SRJK(C) Pei Hua and SMJK Chan Wa, she furthered her musical studies at the Wells Cathedral School, and then the Royal College of Music and the Royal Academy of Music.

== Reviews ==
“...Mei Yi Foo was anointed Newcomer of the Year at the BBC Music Magazine Awards […] she sat down at the piano to give us a taster: three little late-20th century dazzlers, impish and poetic. Immediately we were her devoted fans.” The Times, April 2013

“Mei Yi Foo makes light work of Shostakovich, Berg and Saint-Saëns [...] an enjoyable programme.” The Guardian, March 2017
