= Peter Diamand =

Arts administrator and director

Peter Diamand CBE
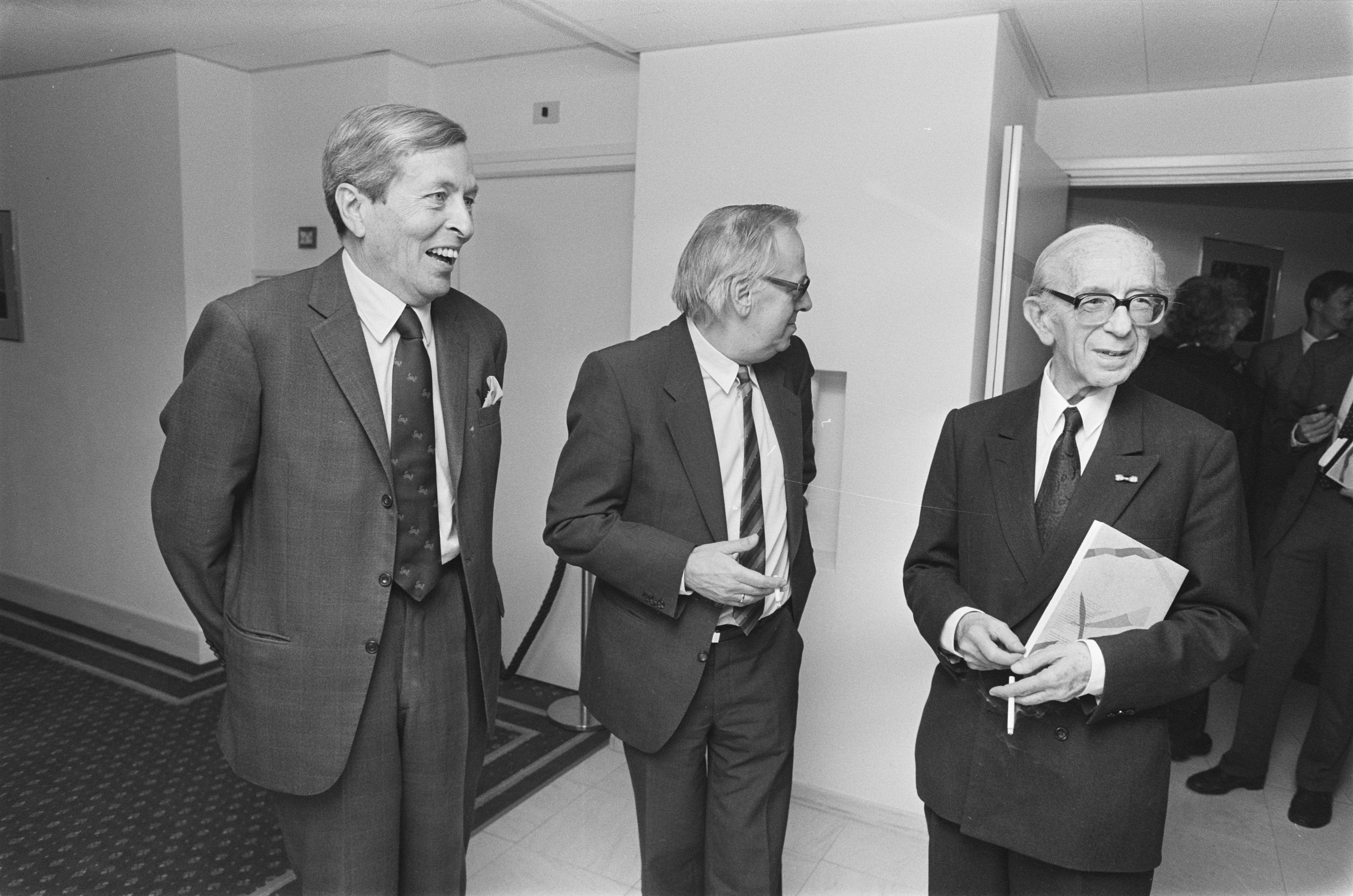
- Prince Claus of the Netherlands, Jan Blokker and Peter Diamand in 1987
- Born: 8 June 1913
- Died: 16 January 1998 (aged 84)
- Occupation: Artistic Director

Peter Diamand, CBE (8 June 1913 – 16 January 1998) was an arts administrator and director of the Edinburgh International Festival from 1965 to 1978.

Diamand was born in Berlin on 8 June 1913, and educated there, but held Austrian nationality. In the early 1930s, being Jewish, he fled to Amsterdam to escape Nazism. While there, he worked as secretary to pianist Artur Schnabel.

Diamand spent some time in a Dutch concentration camp before escaping. He and his mother needed to hide from the Nazis, in attics and other cramped places, with inadequate food. Schnabel's last student, pianist Maria Curcio, looked after them, at great risk and high cost to her own health and career. In 1947, they married. They divorced in 1971. He subsequently married American violinist Sylvia Rosenberg.

He appeared as a castaway on the BBC Radio programme Desert Island Discs on 15 August 1966, and was made an honorary Commander of the Order of the British Empire in 1972.

He was also Artistic advisor for the Orchestre de Paris between 1976 and 1998. He was made Commander of the Ordre des Arts et des Lettres in February 1996.

Diamand died in Amsterdam on 16 January 1998.
