= Maria Curcio =

Italian classical pianist (1918/9–2009)

Maria Curcio (27 August 1918 or 1919 – 30 March 2009) was an Italian classical pianist who became a sought-after teacher. Her students included Barry Douglas, Ignat Solzhenitsyn, Martha Argerich, Radu Lupu, Mitsuko Uchida, Evelyne Brancart, Myung-Whun Chung, Leon Fleisher, Rafael Orozco, Christopher Elton, Hilary Coates, Simone Dinnerstein, Massimiliano Mainolfi, Matthew Schellhorn, and Geoffrey Tozer. She was the last student of Artur Schnabel and she passed on his teachings to her own students.

== Biography ==
Maria Curcio was born in Naples in 1918, to an Italian father and a Jewish-Brazilian mother, who was also a pianist who had studied with a pupil of Ferruccio Busoni. She was playing by age three, and at age seven was taken to Rome to play for Benito Mussolini, but refused to do so. She was tutored at home to leave more time for practising, but she did not have a happy childhood, as she was pushed into accepting too many engagements too soon, and there was no time to play or have friends. Ottorino Respighi invited her to give a recital at his house. She was accepted to the Naples Conservatory at age nine, receiving her degree by 14. Her mother arranged for her to study with Alfredo Casella and Carlo Zecchi (a pupil of Artur Schnabel) in Italy, and with Nadia Boulanger in Paris. She also studied with Artur Schnabel himself from age 15; he did not normally take young pupils, but his son Karl Ulrich persuaded him to audition her. When he did so, he described her as "one of the greatest talents I have ever met". When Schnabel was on tour, she had lessons with Fritz Busch.

She made her London debut in 1939, but at the outbreak of World War II, she was in Amsterdam, where she had followed Schnabel's secretary Peter Diamand, and where she performed frequently. However, during the German occupation of the Netherlands from 1940, when Jews were banned from playing in public, she turned down all offers of engagements in protest (Diamand was Jewish). Diamand spent some time in a Dutch concentration camp before escaping. They then needed to hide from the Nazis, in attics and other cramped places, with inadequate food. She became a victim of malnutrition and tuberculosis, unable to even walk properly, let alone play. Her performing career was now effectively over. She married Diamand in 1948, but she needed years of therapy to restore her power to her legs, arms and fingers. Wilhelm Furtwängler wanted to record with her, but by the time he died in 1954 she still had not recovered sufficient strength. She did, however, finally return to playing; she collaborated with such artists as Benjamin Britten, Carlo Maria Giulini, Szymon Goldberg, Otto Klemperer, Josef Krips, Pierre Monteux and Elisabeth Schwarzkopf. Her last performance was in 1963. She then turned to teaching and giving master classes. She also coached singers at Josef Krips's request when he conducted the Netherlands Opera.

In the meantime, Peter Diamand had been appointed director of the Edinburgh Festival and they had moved to the UK. She served on the jury of the Leeds International Pianoforte Competition in 1966, and on the jury of the Paloma O'Shea Santander International Piano Competition in 1978. She was appointed visiting professor at the Royal Academy of Music, University of London. She played privately with Sir Clifford Curzon, who had introduced her to Benjamin Britten, Peter Pears and their circle in 1947. She often played four-hand piano music with Britten.

She and her husband divorced in 1971 after he had a relationship with Marlene Dietrich. She spent her last few years in Porto, Portugal, where she died in March 2009, aged 90.

BBC Scotland made two films about Maria Curcio in the 1980s: Music in Camera: Maria Curcio – Fulfilling a Legacy and Maria Curcio – Piano Teacher. A documentary of her life, Music Beyond Sound, was made by her student Douglas Ashley in 1993. He also wrote a book of the same name.

== Students ==
Maria Curcio's students came from many countries, and included:

- Pierre-Laurent Aimard
- Martha Argerich
- Thomas Bartlett
- Michel Block
- Evelyne Brancart
- Myung-whun Chung
- Rae de Lisle
- Simone Dinnerstein
- Barry Douglas
- Christopher Elton
- José Feghali
- Leon Fleisher
- Claude Frank
- Peter Frankl
- Frank Glazer
- Anthony Goldstone
- Albert Guinovart
- Sam Haywood
- Jean-François Heisser
- Ian Hobson
- Niel Immelman
- Terence Judd
- Radu Lupu
- Rafael Orozco
- Alfredo Perl
- Matti Raekallio
- Matthew Schellhorn
- Ignat Solzhenitsyn
- Yevgeny Sudbin
- Sergio Tiempo
- Hugh Tinney
- Geoffrey Tozer
- Inon Barnatan
- Mitsuko Uchida.
