= Silvan Loher =

Swiss composer (born 1986)

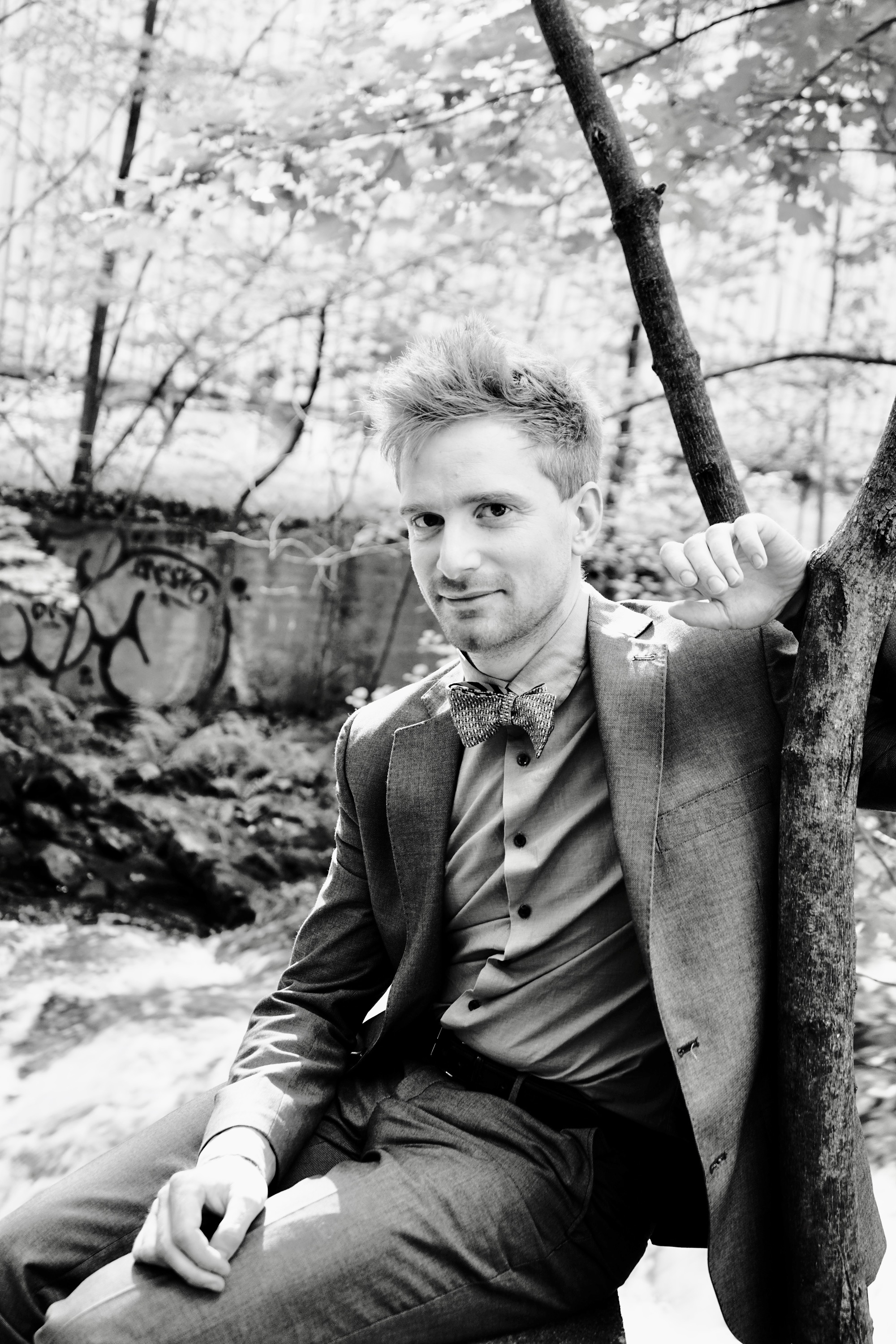
Silvan Loher, Swiss composer

Silvan Loher is a Swiss art music composer, known for his vocal, chamber, and orchestral compositions, which have been recurrently aired on Swiss, British, Italian and European public radio, and favourably reviewed in the Swiss national press. Loher's musical style has been described as differentiated and delicate, his artistic language referred as intense, magically combining drama with tonal poetry. Loher was born in Schaffhausen, Switzerland in 1986, and is now based in Oslo, Norway.

== Education ==
After high school, Loher trained as a dancer for two years at the Zurich Opera House ballet school. Undertaking musical education, in 2006 he began composition studies under Georg Friedrich Haas and Jakob Ullmann at the Hochschule für Musik (Basel), completing a master's degree in composition & music theory in 2013. Loher also attended master composition classes with Beat Furrer, Helmut Lachenmann, Chaya Czernowin and Thomas Jennefelt.

== Career ==
Loher's compositions are often designed for period instruments and voices. Hence he has collaborated with several musical institutions, groups and ensembles, including Schola Cantorum Basiliensis(Basel), De Swaen(Amsterdam), Il Continuo(Cremona), Camerata Variabile (Basel), Voces Suaves (Basel), Cafebaum (Basel), Liedduo Brütsch & Engeli (Laufenburg, Aargau), Media Res (Basel), and Paulus Barokk(Oslo). In 2013, his Clarinet Quintet won a jury's special prize at the VII edition of the " ... a Camillo Togni" contest in Brescia. Loher's compositions have been performed in music festivals such as the Musikalischer Sommer in Ostfriesland (2013), the Bach Festival in Schaffhausen (2018), the Ars Braemia Musikfestival in Rheinau (2019), and the Swiss Chamber Music Festival in Adelboden(2020).

His music has also been performed in concerts in Brescia (2013), Weil am Rhein(2014) Schaffhausen (2014, 2019, 2020), Basel (2014, 2015, 2017, 2019), Cremona (2016), Fribourg(2017), Neuhausen(2017), Zürich(2017), Muri (2017), Laufenburg(2018), Rheinau(2019), Oslo (2019), Hamar (2019), and Adelboden(2020). His compositions have been aired on BBC Radio 3, Rai Radio 3, SRF, and the European EBU.

In 2020 Loher was chosen to contribute to the music for “Rhyality”, a video installation permanently displayed at the "Immersive 360° Art Hall" above the Rhine Falls in the canton of Schaffhausen. Together with Loher as a composer, this work was accomplished with participation of the writer Ursula Haas, the violinist Helena Winkelman, and the jazz pianist Thomas Silvestri.

In 2017, the composer released his first CD, titled Night, Sleep, Death and the Stars, with label Odradek, in collaboration with Swiss radio SRF. The album includes songs for voice and piano comprising poems by the German-speaking Mascha Kaleko and by Walt Whitman, interpreted by Silke Gäng (mezzo-soprano) and Marco Scilironi (piano). The "strict tonality" of the songs, and their reminiscence to chansons from the early twentieth century have been noted. In a comment about this work, music producer Valerio Benz from the Swiss Radio has suggested a resemblance to the styles of Othmar Schoeck or Benjamin Britten.

Loher is a member of the Swiss Association of Musicians (Sonart), and of the Norwegian Society of Composers. A lengthy interview with the composer was published by International Arts Manager magazine in June 2018.

== Works ==
A selection of works by the composer is listed below:

- Quintet for clarinet and strings (2009/2012).
- Durch Kahle Birken (2010-2012), for solo soprano, alto and bass singers, flute, oboe d'amore, oboe di selva, bassoon, two violins, two violas, cello and contrabass, based on poems by Georg Trakl.
- Ten Poems by Walt Whitman (2012-2013), which includes the pieces To You, As If a Phantom Caress’d Me, Aroused and Angry, A Prairie Sunset, A Clear Midnight, Soon Shall The Winter’s Foil Be Here, Joy Shipmate Joy!, To The States, Of Him I Love Day and Night, and Tramp a Perpetual Journey.
- Lieder over poems by Mascha Kaleko (2012-2015), which includes the pieces Interview mit mir selbst, Konsequenz des Herzens, Blasse Tage, Auf eine Leierkastenmelodie, Herbst-Melancholie, Geburtstag, Agota, Kleines Liebeslied, Wenn man nachts nicht schlafen kann, and Gewissermassen ein Herbstgedicht.
- Intermezzi (2014), for baroque orchestra.
- Partita a tre violini senza basso (2016), Ricercar (Andante) – Corale (Largo) – Finale (Allegro risoluto), work commissioned by Ensemble Il Continuo.
- Messe für Muri (2016), for 20 voices and 16 historical instruments, said to be musically accessible and yet mysterious, by a composer who cannot be pigeonholed.
- Dann werden wir kein Feuer brauchen (2017), for voice, clarinet, violin, viola, violoncello and harp.
- Walt Whitman’s Credo (2018), for mezzo-soprano, cor anglais or clarinet, and violoncello.
- De Profundis, cantata for singers and baroque orchestra (2018). A composition exploring relations between dark and bright and their transitions, using complex chords of dissonance and euphony.
- Ungeheuer ist viel und nichts ungeheurer als der Mensch (2018), for soprano solo, 2 choirs and baroque orchestra, a motet based on a text from Sophocles' Antigone.
- Es-Dur (2018), work for violin solo over a poem by Klaus Merz.
- Fantasi og fuge (2018), for baroque orchestra.
- Pappelallee (2018), based on three poems by Ch. Haller.
- Les violons de l’automne (2019), for soprano and 4 violas, a song cycle on the themes of loss and lost love in four different languages.
- Rheinfall im August (2019), for soprano and sinfonietta, composed for the project “Rhyality” over a text by Ursula Haas.
- Sonata for soprano and organ (2020), A piece comprising poems by Walt Whitman and by the Finnish poet Edith Södergran which is said to use an intense musical language, magically combining drama, menace and confidence, with tonal poetry.
- Krusiduller (2020), for violin and piano.
