= Adolfo Gutiérrez Arenas =

Spanish cellist

Adolfo Gutiérrez Arenas (born 1974 in Munich) is a Spanish cellist.

== Early life and studies ==
Adolfo Gutiérrez Arenas studied piano in Munich. At the age of 14, he started playing the cello and also studied in Spain. He graduated from the Reina Sofia School of Music under Frans Helmerson. Later he continued his violoncello studies with Lluis Claret. He participated in master courses with János Starker, Tsuyoshi Tsutsumi, David Geringas and Ralph Kirshbaum. Elías Arizcuren, Gary Hoffman and Bernard Greenhouse were also among his teachers. In 1999 he participated at the International Laureates Music Festival in Los Angeles. He received the Ravel prize as soloist and chamber musician in 2002.

== Artistic activities ==
In 2010 Adolfo Gutiérrez Arenas made his debut with the London Symphony Orchestra in the Ibermusica series in Madrid. There he performed Elgar's Cello Concerto. After that he got invitations from the Royal Philharmonic Orchestra under Charles Dutoit such as from the Orquesta Nacional de España under Ton Koopman and a recital invitation for the Mendelssohn Festival at Gewandhaus Leipzig.

For recital tours in the United States he performed in New York City, Boston, Dallas, San Diego, and Los Angeles. He also played in Amsterdam's Concertgebouw, Auditorio Nacional de Música in Madrid, Ford Theatre in Los Angeles, l’Auditorio and Palau de la Música in Barcelona, Bulgaria Hall in Sofia and Palacio Euskalduna in Bilbao. He had collaborations with conductors such as Edward Gardner, José Ramón Encinar, Roberto Minczuk, Pablo González, Anu Tali, Antoni Ros-Marbà and others.

As chamber musician he was a member of the Beethoven String Quartet, the Scarlatti Piano Quartet and Arizcuren String Trio. With these ensembles, he performed at many festivals and halls such as the Schleswig Holstein Festival in Germany, Ravinia Festival in Chicago, Thy Music Festival in Denmark, Palos Verdes Festival in California, Holland Music Sessions and Taos Music Festival in New Mexico.

In 2015 he made his US orchestral debut with Fort Worth Symphony under Miguel Harth-Bedoya. In 2016, he made his debut with the London Philharmonic Orchestra under Vladimir Jurowski and returned to the Orchesta Nacional de España to work with Krzysztof Penderecki. In Spain, Adolfo Gutiérrez Arenas regularly performs with orchestras like Bilbao Orkestra Sinfonikoa, Orquesta Sinfónica del Principado de Asturias and Orquesta Filarmónica de Málaga.

He gave his German orchestral debut with the Magdeburg Philharmonic under Kimbo Ishii in April 2018. He there played Édouard Lalo's Cello Concerto.

Adolfo Gutiérrez Arenas plays a Francesco Ruggeri, that was handcrafted in Cremona in 1673.

== Discography ==
- J.S. Bach: The Cello Suites (2008). Suites for solo cello BWV 1007–1012. Adolfo Gutiérrez Arenas. Published by Verso.
- Barber, Rachmaninov, Piazzolla (2013). Cello works. Luis Fernando Pérez (piano) and Adolfo Gutiérrez (violoncello). Published by Verso.
- Beethoven: The Cello Sonatas (2016). Adolfo Gutiérrez Arenas (cello) and Christopher Park (piano). Published by Sole Recordings.
- Dvořák: Cello Works (2019). Magdeburg Philharmonic, Adolfo G. Arenas (violoncello), Kimbo Ishii (conductor). Published by IBS Classical.
