= Joanna MacGregor =

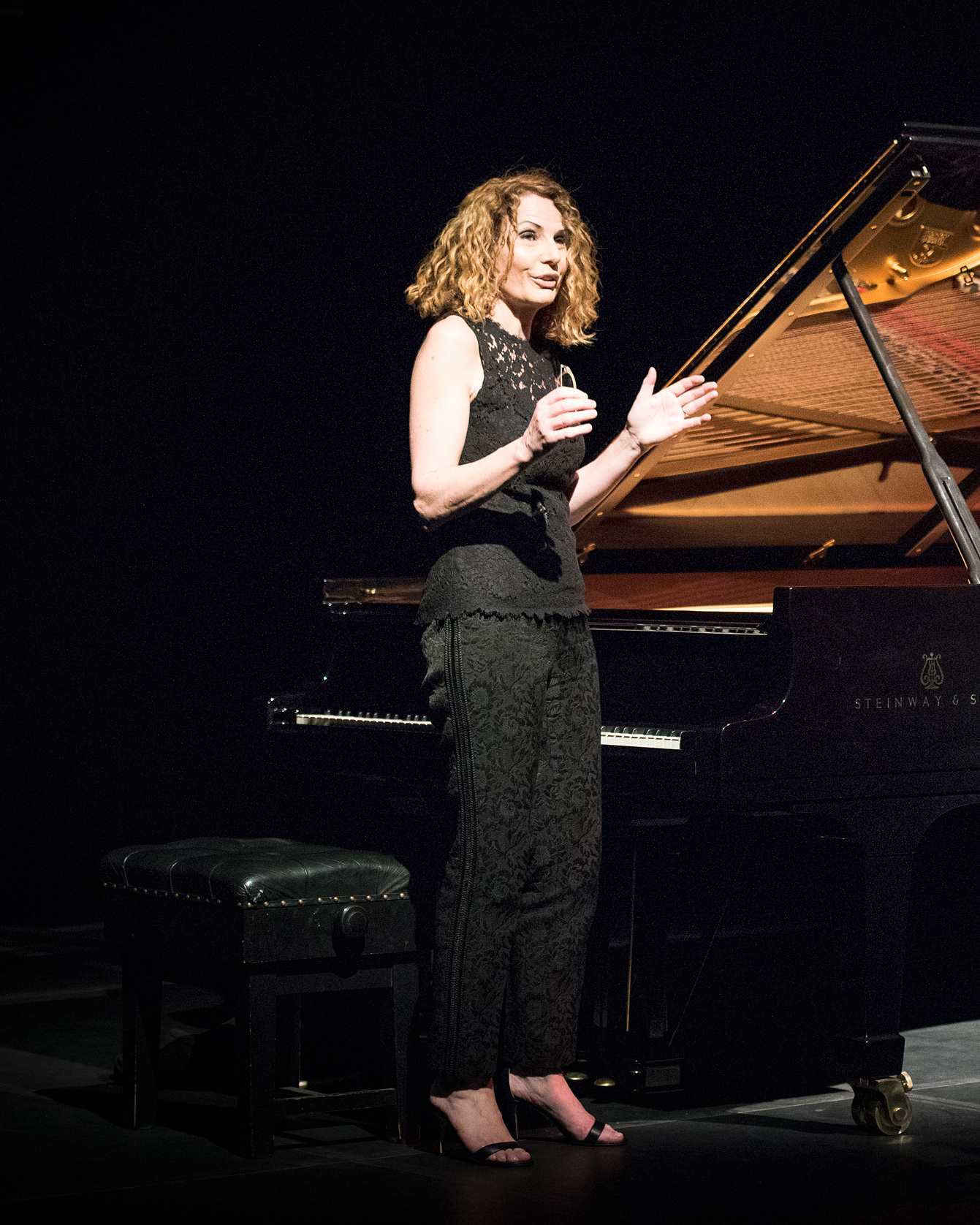
- MacGregor in 2015

Background information
- Born: 16 July 1959 (age 67)
- Genres: Jazz, classical
- Occupations: Pianist, composer, conductor
- Website: Official site

Joanna Clare MacGregor CBE (born 16 July 1959) is a British concert pianist, conductor, composer, and festival curator. She is Head of Piano at the Royal Academy of Music and a professor of the University of London. She was artistic director of the International Summer School & Festival at Dartington Hall from 2015 to 2019.

== Biography ==
MacGregor grew up in North London, and was educated at home, with her brother and sister, by her parents; she won a free place to South Hampstead High School at the age of 11. Her mother is a piano teacher and taught her when she was a young child, and her father worked in the printing trade. MacGregor began studying with Christopher Elton at the age of seventeen, and read music at New Hall (now Murray Edwards College, Cambridge) (1978–81) where she was taught composition by Hugh Wood. After Cambridge, she pursued postgraduate studies at the Royal Academy of Music. She became Head of Piano at the Royal Academy of Music in 2011.

In the early years of her performing career, MacGregor was a prolific composer for the theatre (including work for Cheek by Jowl, and Oxford Stage Company's production of Hamlet at Elsinore Castle and the Edinburgh Festival). She was one of the first artists to be selected for the Young Concert Artists Trust in 1985, and has since performed in more than seventy countries, appearing as a solo artist with many of the world's leading orchestras, including the New York Philharmonic, London Symphony Orchestra, Netherlands Radio Philharmonic Orchestra, Oslo Philharmonic Orchestra, Chicago Symphony Orchestra and Berlin Symphony Orchestra, London Philharmonia, Melbourne Symphony and Sydney Symphony Orchestras, Hong Kong Philharmonic, BBC Symphony and Salzburg Camerata.

The conductors with whom she has worked include Pierre Boulez, Sir Simon Rattle, Sir Colin Davis, Michael Tilson Thomas, and Valery Gergiev, and she has appeared in many of the world's greatest venues, including the Wigmore Hall, Southbank Centre and the Barbican in London, Sydney Opera House, New York's Lincoln Center, Leipzig Gewandhaus, the Concertgebouw in Amsterdam and the Mozarteum concert hall in Salzburg.

Between 1997 and 2000, MacGregor was Professor of Music at Gresham College, London, giving free public lectures. She was appointed as Professor of Performance at Liverpool Hope University in 2007.

== Repertoire ==
MacGregor is particularly known for her Bach interpretations and recordings, and was invited by Sir John Eliot Gardiner to perform the Goldberg Variations at the Royal Albert Hall in April 2013. She is also currently performing the complete Mozart concertos and Beethoven sonatas, and performed the complete Chopin Mazurkas to widespread acclaim in 2010. Alongside core piano repertoire, she has premiered many landmark compositions – including piano concertos by Sir Harrison Birtwistle, Django Bates, Hugh Wood, John Adams, Alasdair Nicolson, Jonathan Harvey and James MacMillan – and has commissioned over 100 new works.

== Conducting, curating and collaboration ==
MacGregor made her conducting debut in 2002 and regularly directs her own orchestral projects, including an all-Mozart programme with the Royal Philharmonic Orchestra and Bach with the Hallé. She enjoys a close artistic partnership as conductor and performer with Britten Sinfonia, in programmes ranging from classical music to collaborations with jazz and world musicians, including Andy Sheppard, Seb Rochford, Nitin Sawhney and Arve Henriksen. In 2009 she opened the London Jazz Festival with Britten Sinfonia and Arabic singer and oud virtuoso Dhafer Youssef, hailed by The Times as 'the future of music'. Their fifteen-year orchestral partnership has continued with tours in Europe and Latin America.

She created (with composer Alasdair Nicolson) the Platform Festival of contemporary and improvised music, which ran at the ICA in London from 1991 until 1993; a series of music events, SoundCircus, ranging from Elvis Costello and Courtney Pine to Ensemble Modern and Steve Reich, at Bridgewater Hall, Manchester (1997–99); a celebration of British contemporary music (featuring Tom Ades) for the New York Philharmonic (1999); and Cross Border with Jin Xing's Contemporary Dance Theatre of Shanghai, combining Chinese traditional music with computer technology and film. Cross Border toured China in 2003.

From 2006 until 2012, MacGregor was the Artistic Director of the Bath International Music Festival, where alongside many classical artists, ensembles and orchestras, she commissioned Brian Eno, the writer and cultural historian Marina Warner, jazz and electronica artists, folk musician Kathryn Tickell, and poets Roger McGough and Michael Rosen. She instigated Party in the City, a massive, free event which takes over the whole city of Bath on the first Friday of the Festival; she also created the annual installation On the Edge of Life, bringing together visual artists, scientists, writers and musicians examining issues as diverse as premature birth, homelessness and child human rights.

In 2010, she curated the multi-arts festival Deloitte Ignite for the Royal Opera House, which included performances from the Royal Ballet and Phoenix Dance Theatre, Ex Cathedra, the aerialist Ilona Jäntti, Jah Wobble, Talvin Singh, and Tibetan Monks from Tashi Lumpo Monastery, as well as major installations from the Royal College of Art and the sculptural artist Alice Anderson.

In 2014, she was announced as Artistic Director for Dartington International Summer School and Festival. MacGregor's fifth and last festival was held in 2019. Since 2020, the festival has been curated by Sara Mohr-Pietsch.

== Books and broadcasts ==
In 1990 the BBC broadcast MacGregor's radio play, Memoirs of an Amnesiac, about the life of Erik Satie, with Jim Broadbent. It was nominated for the Prix Italia.

Her series of colourful piano teaching books for children, Piano World, was published in May 2001 by Faber Music. The books feature storytelling, cartoons, games and include companion CDs, with music ranging from classical and jazz to gospel and hip hop. Her short piano piece, Lowside Blues, was chosen for the Associated Board Grade 7 piano exams, and became very popular with young pianists worldwide.

Recent compositions have included Lute Songs (2008) (based on the music of Dowland), and Lost Highway (2010), for piano and orchestra. In 2012 she revived and re-worked, with director Richard Williams, a popular adaption of Mozart's The Magic Flute, for chamber ensemble and seven opera singers. It has toured extensively, and was chosen as her swansong at Bath International Music Festival.

MacGregor broadcasts regularly on television and radio; in 2012 she was the soloist in three BBC Proms, and her performance of Bach's Goldberg Variations was broadcast live from the Albert Hall in 2013. She was the subject of an edition of The South Bank Show in December 2001 and presented her own series Strings, Bows, and Bellows for BBC television. She also filmed Bach's Well-Tempered Clavier for BBC television, as well as appearing in the Great Composers Series.

== Honours and awards ==
MacGregor has received honorary Fellowships from the Royal Academy of Music, Trinity College of Music, and Murray Edwards, Cambridge (New Hall). She has been awarded Honorary Doctorates from the University of St Andrews, the Open University, the University of Bath and Bath Spa University. MacGregor was appointed as Member of the Arts Council England in 1998 alongside Anish Kapoor, Brian McMaster, Anthony Gormley and Andrew Motion, leaving in 2004.

She was recognised for her innovation with a Royal Philharmonic Society award in 2003 for imaginative programming and tireless work in opening up music to new audiences. Other awards include European Encouragement Prize for Music 1995, NFMS Sir Charles Groves Award 1998, and South Bank Show Award for Classical Music 2000. MacGregor was appointed Officer of the Order of the British Empire (OBE) in the 2012 Birthday Honours and Commander of the Order of the British Empire (CBE) in the 2019 Birthday Honours, both for services to music.

== Recordings and SoundCircus label ==
Between 1990 and 1995, MacGregor made more than 15 solo recordings with Collins Classics, ranging from Bach and Domenico Scarlatti to music by Ravel, Debussy, Ives, Bartók and Messiaen, as well as contemporary music.

In 1998, she launched her own record label SoundCircus in association with John L. Walters' Unknown Public. The label combines new recordings with re-releases of older recordings which MacGregor was able to reclaim after Collins Classics ceased trading. She now owns the copyright to all of her recorded material, and the label is now in partnership with Warner Classical and Jazz.

== Discography ==
- Collins Classics:
  - American Classics (1989) Ives, Copland, Nancarrow, Monk, Garner (originally on LDR)
  - Britten Piano Concerto (1990) English Chamber Orchestra, Stuart Bedford
  - Erik Satie Piano Music (1990)
  - Ives: Sonata No.1/Barber: Sonata, Op. 26/Excursions, Op. 20 . (1990)
  - Domenico Scarlatti Keyboard Sonatas (1991)
  - Gershwin: Piano Concerto in F, Rhapsody in Blue (original jazz band version) London Symphony Orchestra, Carl Davis
  - MacGregor on Broadway (1991) Gershwin Songbook, and new pieces by Django Bates, Michael Finnissy, Gary Carpenter, Alasdair Nicolson
  - Hugh Wood: Piano Concerto, Op. 31 (1992) BBC Symphony Orchestra, Sir Andrew Davis
  - Bartók/Debussy/Ravel: Piano Works (1993)
  - Birtwistle: Antiphonies for Piano and Orchestra Radio Filharmonisch Orkest, Michael Gielen (1994)
  - Bach Six French Suites (1994)
  - Krauze/Messiaen: Quatuor pour la fin du temps (1994)
  - Olivier Messiaen Vingt Regards sur L'Enfant Jésus (1995)
  - Counterpoint: Bach Art of Fugue and works by Conlon Nancarrow (1995)
- Sound Circus:
  - Piano Language SC001, with jazz pianist Nikki Yeoh (1998)
  - Outside in Pianist SC002, clips and interviews (1998)
  - Perilous Night SC003: double album of John Cage's Sonatas and Interludes, Perilous Night and Bacchanale, with new work by Deidre Gribbin, Jonathan Harvey, Django Bates and others (1998)
  - Birtwistle Harrison's Clocks SC004 (2000)
  - Lou Harrison Piano Concerto SC005, with Sydney Symphony Orchestra, Sian Edwards (2001)
  - Damba Moon, Ensemble Bash SC006 (2001)
  - Play (2001), Sound Circus SC007: music includes Bach, Dowland, Piazzolla, Ligeti, Howard Skempton, Somei Satoh
  - Neural Circuits SC008: music by Messiaen, Schnittke (piano concerto), Arvo Pärt and Nitin Sawhney alongside music based on traditional Ghanaian melodies (2002)
  - Bach Six French Suites reissue SC901 (2003)
  - Satie Piano Music reissue SC902 (2003)
  - Scarlatti Keyboard Sonatas reissue SC903 (2003)
  - Quiet Music Sound Circus SC904 (2004)
  - Deep River SC009: Music of the Deep South, with Andy Sheppard (2005)
  - Sidewalk Dances: music by Moondog, with Andy Sheppard, Kuljit Bhamra, Seb Rochford, Britten Sinfonia SC010 (2006)
  - Live in Buenos Aires: Bach concertos and music by Piazzolla, Stravinsky and Gismonti, with Britten Sinfonia (2007)
  - Bach: The Goldberg Variations, recorded in Salzburg's Mozarteum concert hall (2008)
  - Messiaen: Vingt Regards/Quatuor pour la fin du temps/Harawi, with soprano Charlotte Riedijk (2010)

See also reissues on SoundCircus/Warner Classics and Jazz

== Concerto repertoire: piano and orchestra ==
- John Adams: Century Rolls
- Bach: Concerto in D minor, BWV 1052; Concerto in F minor, BWV 1056
- Bartók Concerto No. 3
- Django Bates What It's Like To Be Alive
- Beethoven Piano Concerto No. 2 in B♭, Op. 19; Concerto No. 3 in C minor, Op. 37; Triple Concerto, Op. 56; Concerto No. 4 in G, Op. 58; Concerto No. 5 In E♭, Op. 73; Choral Fantasy, Op. 80
- Berg Chamber Concerto
- Birtwistle Antiphonies; Slow Frieze
- Brahms Concerto No. 1 in D minor, Op. 15
- Britten Piano Concerto; Young Apollo; Diversions
- Cage Concerto for Prepared Piano and Chamber Orchestra
- Gershwin Rhapsody in Blue; 2nd Rhapsody; I Got Rhythm Variations; Concerto in F major
- Grieg Concerto in A minor Op. 16
- Lou Harrison Concerto for Piano and Selected Orchestra
- Jonathan Harvey Bird Concerto with Pianosong
- Hindemith Kammermusik No. 2, Op. 36, No. 1
- Ligeti Piano Concerto
- James MacMillan Concerto No. 1 (The Berserking); Concerto No. 2
- Frank Martin Petite Symphonie Concertante, Op. 54
- Messiaen Turangalîla-Symphonie; Oiseaux exotiques; Les Couleurs de la Cité Celeste; Trois petites liturgies de la présence divine
- Mozart Complete concertos
- Alasdair Nicolson Rain gathering in your eyes
- Arvo Pärt Lamentate
- Prokofiev Piano Concerto No. 2 in G minor, Op. 16
- Rachmaninov Rhapsody on a Theme of Paganini, Op. 43
- Ravel Piano Concerto for the Left Hand; Piano Concerto in G
- Schnittke Concerto for Piano and Strings
- Shostakovich Concerto for Piano, Trumpet and Strings in C minor, Op. 35; Concerto No. 2 in F, Op. 102
- Stravinsky Concerto for Piano and Wind Instruments
- Hugh Wood Piano Concerto
