= Yaron Kohlberg =

Israeli pianist (born 1983)

Yaron Kohlberg ירון קולברג
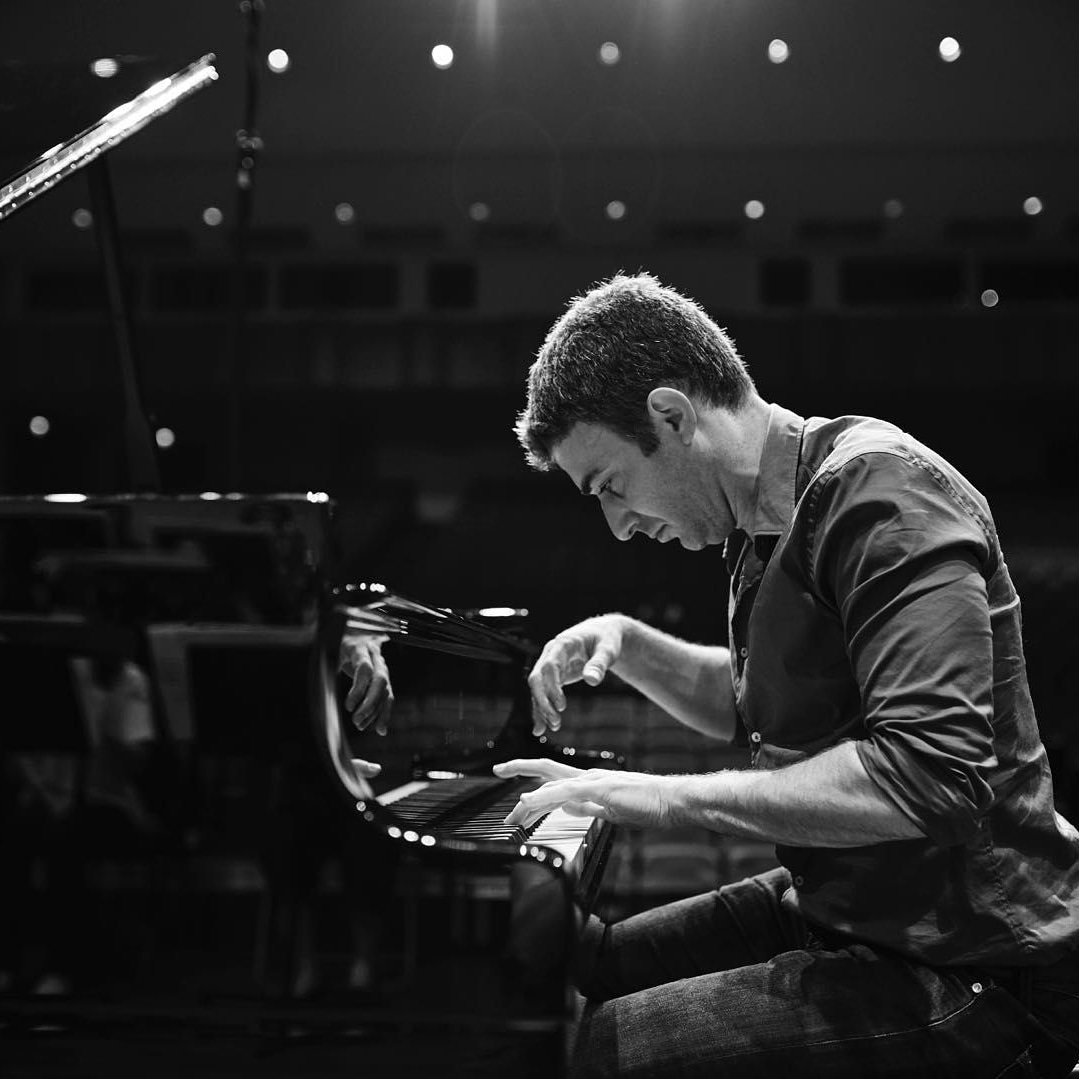
- Yaron Kohlberg

Background information
- Born: 6 March 1983 (age 43); Jerusalem, Israel
- Genres: Classical
- Occupation: Pianist
- Instrument: Piano
- Education: Buchmann-Mehta School of Music, Tel Aviv University
- Awards: Cleveland Competition (2007); International Parnassos Competition (2006); Top of the World Competition (2011)

Yaron Kohlberg (Hebrew: ירון קולברג; born in Jerusalem on 6 March 1983) is an Israeli pianist. He won prestigious international prizes and performs regularly on major stages worldwide. Beginning in 2018, Kohlberg is the Artistic Director of the Cleveland International Piano Competition.

He is the son of Islamicist professor Etan Kohlberg and violinist Bat-Sheva Savaldi-Kohlberg.

Kohlberg started playing piano in 1990. He studied with Luisa Yoffe, Eitan Globerson and Arie Vardi, and in 2009 obtained a master's degree with distinction from the Buchmann-Mehta school of music of Tel Aviv University.

Kohlberg is among today's top Israeli pianists. He played in major halls in 40 countries over five continents and has won ten international prizes. His performances won critical acclaim, and he was described by international media as "the pianist with the golden hands".

Centers at which he appeared in recitals and concerts include famous halls such as the Carnegie Hall in New York City, the Kremlin in Moscow and the Moscow Cathedral, the UN Hall in Geneva, Kennedy Center in Washington D.C., the Beethovenhalle in Bonn, Asahi hall in Tokyo, Beijing Concert Hall, Severance Hall in Cleveland, Mann Auditorium in Tel Aviv, Salle Cortot and Les Invalides in Paris, Bellas Artes in Mexico City, Teatro Coliseo in Buenos Aires and the New Opera House in Oslo. His performances have been broadcast on major TV stations in China, Korea and Japan.

Kohlberg appeared as soloist with the Cleveland Orchestra, Beijing Symphony Orchestra, Copenhagen Philharmonic Orchestra, The Norwegian Radio Orchestra, Palermo orchestra in Italy and others. He also played with most leading Israeli orchestras, including the Israel Philharmonic Orchestra, the Jerusalem and Haifa Symphony Orchestras, the Israel Camerata, the Israel Chamber Orchestra and the Tel Aviv Soloists Ensemble.

Kohlberg has played as a soloist at the Israel Festival and has given recitals in the music center in Brigham Young University (Mormon University) in Jerusalem and in Tel Aviv Museum. He also appeared in various television shows and recorded with the Israeli radio "Voice of Music". He served on the jury of international competitions in Israel, U.S., China and Mexico.

In recent years, Kohlberg was part of the successful "Duo Amal", together with his friend Bishara Haroni. He collaborated with international artists and ensembles and with leading Israeli artists, including Shlomi Shaban, Ariel Quartet, Carmel Quartet, Percadu, and others. In some of his appearances he combines classical music with new transcriptions of popular music and world music.

Beginning in 2018, Kohlberg is the Artistic Director of the Cleveland International Piano Competition.

He has recorded few CDs: A live recording Cd of Schumann's davidsbundlertanze by WGBH radio station (2009), Cd "Passionate " with cellist Toke Moldrup at the CDKLASSIK label (2011), and Beethoven's complete works for cello and piano with cellist Toke Moldrup at the Aulicus Label (2020)

Kohlberg, who speaks six languages, resides today in China, where he is managed by the local TV, as well as appearing regularly in various concerts and giving masterclasses and workshops in Chinese.

== Awards and Prizes ==
International piano competitions in which Kohlberg won top prizes include the prestigious Cleveland competition (2007), the international Parnassos competition in Monterrey (Mexico) (2006), Top of the World competition in Tromsø (Norway) (2011), the Tivoli competition (Copenhagen) (2008), the international Grieg competition in Oslo (2006), the international competition in Andorra (2006) and the Shostakovich competition (Hanover) (1997).

In Israel he won the piano competition of the Jerusalem Academy of Music (2000), the Clairmont award (2001), the outstanding participant at the Tel Hai piano masterclass (2006), and the young artist competition (2006). Between 1992 and 2008 he won annual scholarships from the America-Israel Cultural Foundation (with distinction).
