= Browning (name) =

Browning is both a surname and a given name. Notable people with the name include:

== Surname ==
- Alan Browning, professional name of Alan Brown (1926–1979), English actor
- Baron Browning (born 1999), American football player
- Bryan Browning (1773–1856), English architect
- Cal Browning (1938–2022), American baseball player
- Christopher Browning, American historian focusing on the Holocaust
- Curtis Browning (born 1993), Australian Rugby Union player
- David Browning, American Olympic diver
- Donovan Browning, English footballer
- Edmond L. Browning (1929–2016), American bishop
- Edward Browning (1816–1882), English architect
- Elizabeth Barrett Browning (1806-1861), English poet
- Emma Carter Browning (1910–2010), American pilot and aviation executive
- Emily Browning, Australian actor
- Ethel Browning (actress) (1876/1877–1965), American actress and screenwriter
- Ethel Browning (toxicologist) (1891–1969), British medical researcher
- Etheldred Browning (1869-1946), Anglo-Irish suffragette, founder of the Women's Pioneer Housing organisation
- Frederick Browning, English World War II lieutenant general
- George Browning (bishop) (born 1942), Anglican Bishop of Canberra and Goulburn
- George L. Browning (1867–1947), American justice
- Greg Browning (born 1953), Australian field hockey player
- Guy Browning, British humourist and author
- Jack Browning (born 2001), American football player
- Jake Browning (born 1996), American football player
- John Browning (disambiguation), several people
- Jonathan Browning (disambiguation), several people
- Keith Browning, British meteorologist
- Kurt Browning, Canadian skater
- Kurt S. Browning, Florida politician
- Martin Browning (born 1946), British professor of economics
- Maurice Browning (1919–1983), English actor
- Miles Browning (1897–1954), American World War II rear admiral
- Richard Browning (disambiguation), several people
- Ricou Browning (1930–2023), American actor and film director
- Robert Browning (1812–1889), English poet
- Tod Browning, American film director
- Tom Browning (1960–2022), American baseball player
- Tom Browning (entomologist) (1920–1998), Australian scientist
- Tracey Browning (born 1963), Australian basketball player
- Tracy Y. Browning (born 1976), American LDS leader
- Tyias Browning (born 1994), English footballer
- Val A. Browning (1895–1994), American firearms inventor and industrialist
- William A. Browning (1835–1866), American political staffer, personal secretary to President Andrew Johnson

== Given name ==
- Browning Bryant, professional name of John Baxter Browning Bryant (1957–2019), American singer-songwriter
- Browning Mummery (1888–1974), Australian operatic tenor
- Browning Ross, American athlete at the 1948 and 1952 Olympics, known as the father of long-distance running in the United States

== See also ==
- Browning (disambiguation)
