= Miles Browning =

American World War II admiral

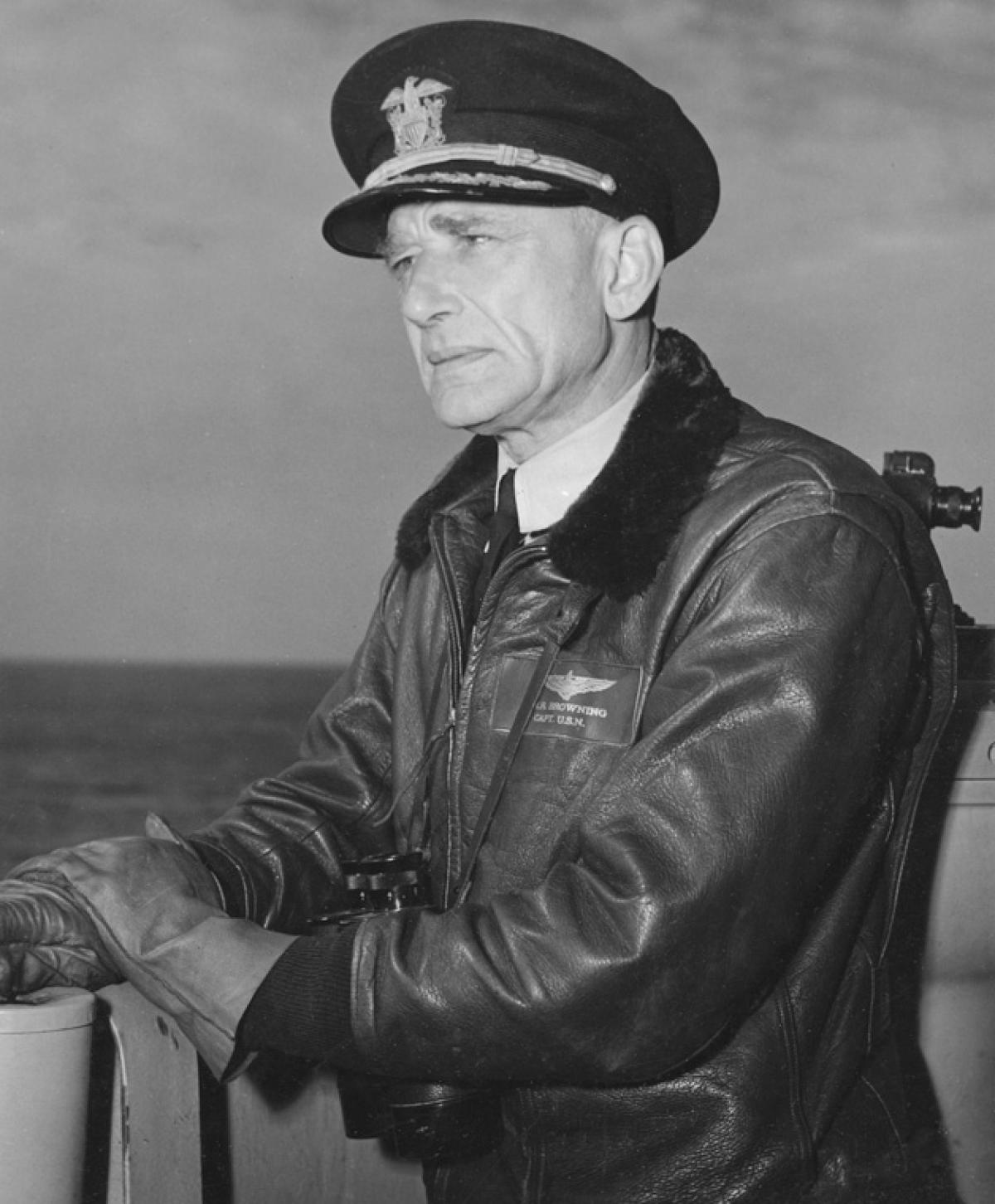
- Captain Miles Browning
- Born: Miles Rutherford Browning; April 10, 1897; Perth Amboy, New Jersey, U.S.
- Died: September 29, 1954 (aged 57); Boston, Massachusetts, U.S.
- Burial place: Arlington National Cemetery
- Military career
- Allegiance: United States of America
- Branch: United States Navy
- Service years: 1917–1947
- Rank: Rear Admiral
- Commands: USS Hornet (CV-12)
- Conflicts: World War I: Atlantic Fleet Forces; World War II: Battle of Midway; Battle of Guadalcanal; Battle of the Eastern Solomons; Battle of the Santa Cruz Islands; Gilbert and Marshall Islands campaign; New Guinea campaign
- Awards: Distinguished Service Medal; Silver Star

Miles Rutherford Browning (April 10, 1897 – September 29, 1954) was an officer in the United States Navy in the Atlantic during World War I and in the Pacific during World War II. An early test pilot in the development of carrier-based Navy aircraft and a pioneer in the development of aircraft carrier combat operations concepts, he is noted for his aggressive aerial warfare tactics as a Navy captain on the Admiral's staff aboard USS Enterprise and at Nouméa during World War II. His citation for the Distinguished Service Medal states: "His judicious planning and brilliant execution was largely responsible for the rout of the enemy Japanese fleet in the Battle of Midway." Naval historian Craig Symonds disagrees, however, writing that "the citation claimed that Browning was 'largely responsible' for the American victory at Midway, an assertion that some historians have taken seriously but which is manifestly untrue."

Browning served as Admiral William Halsey's chief of staff aboard USS Enterprise as it launched air attacks on Japanese-held islands across the Pacific in February and March 1942, helped plan and execute the Doolittle Raid that launched 16 Army twin-engine B-25 bombers from USS Hornet to bomb Tokyo in April 1942, served as Admiral Raymond Spruance's chief of staff aboard USS Enterprise during the Battle of Midway in June 1942, served as Admiral Halsey's chief of staff at Nouméa during the Guadalcanal campaign in October–November 1942, and commanded the recently built new aircraft carrier USS Hornet (CV-12) during the early weeks of the Western New Guinea campaign in April–May 1944. He was removed from command in May 1944, after a shipboard incident in which a Hornet sailor drowned. For the rest of the war, he taught aircraft carrier tactics at the Command and General Staff College at Fort Leavenworth, Kansas. He retired in 1947.

== Early life ==
Miles Browning was born in Perth Amboy, New Jersey, the son of Sarah Louise (née Smith) and New York City stockbroker Oren Fogle Browning, Jr. He attended public schools before his appointment to the U.S. Naval Academy, Annapolis, in 1914. His class graduated early; he was commissioned Ensign with the Class of 1918 on June 29, 1917, a few weeks after the U.S. entered World War I.

== Career ==
Following graduation, Browning briefly served on USS Oklahoma, a battleship of the U.S. Atlantic Fleet. From February 1918 he then had duty in connection with fitting out the battleship New Mexico. In June 1918, he joined the French cruiser Lutetia, and was an observer aboard while she operated with Cruiser Force, Atlantic Fleet, through the end of the war.

After the end of World War I, Browning spent four consecutive years afloat, serving on the battleship USS Pennsylvania (flagship of the Atlantic Fleet), on the destroyer McKean, and as Engineer Officer of Crane and later Howard (destroyers operating with the U.S. Pacific Fleet). Lieutenant Browning joined the destroyer Badger in 1920, serving as executive officer (XO) until he was transferred a year later to similar duty as XO of the destroyer Kidder. From 1922 to January 1924, Browning served as Senior Patrol Officer on the cruiser USS Charleston and the destroyer USS Thompson, operating out of Naval Station San Diego.

In January 1924, Browning reported to Naval Air Station Pensacola for flight training. He showed exceptional skill in the cockpit, but also exhibited a "wild streak" that struck his squadron mates as "potentially dangerous." Designated Naval Aviator on September 29, 1924, he became one of America's earliest Navy combat pilots, joining USS Langley, America's first aircraft carrier, which had been converted from the Navy collier USS Jupiter. From January 1925 until May 1927, Browning was assigned to Observation Squadron 2, attached first to the minelayer Aroostook, then later to the battleship Idaho. Advanced to Operations Officer, he served for two years at Naval Station Norfolk, Virginia. He was assigned his first aviation command in July 1929: Scouting Squadron 5S, the aviation unit of the light cruiser Trenton. During that time he performed additional duty on the staff of the commander of Light Cruiser Division Two of the Scouting Fleet (USS Trenton, flagship).

As an aviator flying warplanes between the wars, Browning helped develop and implement fighter aircraft tactics and strategy; he also helped shape how Navy combat aircraft were designed and built. In July 1931, he reported to the Navy's Bureau of Aeronautics to serve in the Material Division (Design), and spent the next three years helping to design and test combat aircraft. As a test pilot, he crashed a plane in 1932 and was laid up in a San Diego naval hospital. The new monoplane fighters Browning and others piloted went through numerous upgrades in both structure and function, every design change hotly debated by men whose lives were at stake. Browning was part of the group of "progressives" who pushed for development of a fast high-performance fighter, with maneuverability secondary to speed. These men felt that a true fighter had to be fast enough to quickly overtake and shoot down enemy planes. Unfortunately for Browning and his like-minded colleagues, the Bureau of Aeronautics continued to emphasize maneuverability, climb rate, and flight ceiling at the expense of speed and other characteristics that the progressives argued were more important. If the bureau had been more receptive to an emphasis on speed, the United States Navy might have entered World War II with a more advanced high-performance fighter.

In June 1934, Browning was given command of Fighting Squadron 3B, based on USS Langley and later on USS Ranger, the first American warship built from the keel up as an aircraft carrier. He served in that capacity until June 1936, when he reported to the Naval War College in Newport, Rhode Island, for postgraduate studies with additional duty at the Naval Torpedo Station there. Upon completion of his junior year in 1937, he became one of the first naval instructors at the Army Air Corps Tactical School at Maxwell Field in Montgomery, Alabama, training a new generation of fighter pilots while continuing his advanced studies in combat theory, national security policy, airborne command and control and joint military operations.

In 1936, the year that Nazi Germany allied with Fascist Italy and Imperial Japan, Browning laid out his tactical logic in a 13-page, single-spaced, typewritten memorandum on carrier warfare prepared at the Naval War College. Browning's essay briefly noted the vulnerability of carriers during the aircraft re-arming process, which was later demonstrated conclusively during the Battle of Midway.

After completing his academic work, Browning was appointed to Admiral William F. Halsey's staff in the new billet of Air Tactical Officer. In June 1938, he joined the United States' second new aircraft carrier, Yorktown, to serve as commander of Yorktown's carrier air wing. Browning organized the Fleet Aircraft Tactical Unit based on Yorktown, and commanded it for two additional years. When Halsey became the commander of Air Battle Forces two years later, Browning remained on his staff as Operations and War Plans Officer, and he became Halsey's chief of staff in June 1941. From the onset of U.S. involvement in World War II, Browning provided tactical recommendations to Admiral Halsey from the bridge of the carrier USS Enterprise.

As war loomed on the horizon, Halsey had Browning prepare the Enterprise crew and her aircraft squadrons. When the Japanese attacked Pearl Harbor on Dec 7, 1941, the Enterprise was en route to Hawaii after delivering a Marine Corps fighter squadron to Wake Island. USS Enterprise scout bombers arrived over Pearl during the attack, and immediately went into action in defense of the naval base. Six of them were shot down. The carrier reached the devastated harbor on the evening of 8 December, the day after the attack, refueled and resupplied through the night, and put to sea again early the next morning to patrol against any additional threats to the Hawaiian Islands. (Enterprise planes sank a Japanese submarine on December 10, 1941, three days into the war.)

With the United States Pacific Fleet nearly destroyed, USS Enterprise and her battle group took up forward defensive positions west of Hawaii. Eight of the fleet's nine battleships had been trapped in the harbor, four of them sunk and four heavily damaged, along with three of the fleet's eight cruisers that had also been in port during the dawn attack. With the battleship force crippled, defense against further Japanese attacks on the United States and its territories was left to the three aircraft carriers stationed in the Pacific: USS Enterprise and the converted battlecruisers Lexington and Saratoga.

Designated flagship of the Pacific Fleet, Enterprise sailed in January 1942 to protect American convoys reinforcing Samoa. Soon after this, Enterprise went on the offensive. In February and March 1942, Enterprise launched numerous hit-and-run air raids on Japanese bases at Kwajalein, Wotje, and Maloelap in the Marshall Islands, as well as enemy installations in the Gilbert Islands, on Marcus Island, and on Wake Island. Halsey gave credit for much of this success to his chief of staff, and recommended Commander Browning for a spot promotion to the rank of captain. So dramatic were these air raids on Japanese island bases that Life magazine dubbed Browning "America's mastermind in aerial warfare."

CINCPAC approved Browning's promotion that April, following the "Doolittle Raid" he had helped plan and execute. Dubbed "Jimmy Doolittle's Raid" by the American press, the daring scheme launched 16 Army Air Forces long-range bombers, led by Lt. Col. James H. Doolittle, from the deck of the carrier Hornet, with Enterprise providing combat air support. Doolittle's B-25 squadron dropped bombs on Tokyo and other Japanese cities on April 18, 1942, completely surprising the Japanese and giving beleaguered American troops and the American public a much-needed boost in morale.

=== Midway ===
Admiral Halsey suffered a severe attack of dermatitis on the Enterprise on the way back from launch of the successful Doolittle bombing raid, and was hospitalized in Hawaii. Rear Admiral Raymond A. Spruance, Halsey's hand-picked successor, inherited Halsey's staff just prior to the Battle of Midway. Spruance, who had commanded a cruiser division since the beginning of the war, was concerned about leading a carrier group because he had no prior aviation or carrier experience. Halsey reassured him, telling Spruance to rely on his battle-tested staff, especially Browning.

Unfortunately, Browning had an abrasive personality. Spruance found it difficult to get along with his chief of staff during and after Midway. Military historian Samuel Eliot Morison referred to Browning as "one of the most irascible officers ever to earn a fourth stripe, but he was a man with a slide-rule brain." Others said he had a "calculator brain" and "a superintellect that evoked praise – often begrudging – from his superiors." Browning is commonly described as "crusty and brawling," clever, daring, exceptionally aggressive, and uncontrollable. He was willful, arrogant, a hard drinker, and violent tempered. Despite his many personality flaws, he was respected as a brilliant tactical officer.

Midway would be a critical battle for the United States and its allies, one that all parties knew might very well determine the outcome of the war in the Pacific. After the devastation of its battleships at Pearl Harbor six months earlier, the U.S. Navy was forced to place all its hopes on a small aircraft carrier force that was dwarfed by the strength of Japan's Combined Fleet. As chief of staff for Task Force 16, Browning was charged with supporting Rear Admiral Spruance during the impending battle as the Imperial Japanese Navy, undefeated for over 350 years, bore down on Midway Island.

American signals intelligence had intercepted and decrypted Japanese radio messages. Because of this, they knew that Midway was the Combined Fleet's invasion target, and they had a good estimate of the invasion fleet's direction of approach and anticipated time of arrival at the island. Although the Japanese Navy was not aware of this breach in its radio security, it did change its codes in accordance with protocol as its fleet steamed across the Pacific toward the strategic U.S. air base at Midway. Commanded by Admiral Isoroku Yamamoto, the Imperial Fleet knew it would meet resistance, but did not know it had lost the element of surprise. Yamamoto's intent was to draw whatever was left of the American fleet into a battle so that any remaining U.S. warships could be destroyed, then occupy Midway and use it as a base against Hawaii and as leverage for a negotiated peace. Yamamoto's second-in-command, Vice Admiral Chuichi Nagumo, the hero of Pearl Harbor, also expected to achieve complete surprise at Midway. He failed to anticipate attacks from any of America's remaining carriers, and presumed that the heavily damaged Yorktown had been sunk during the Battle of the Coral Sea.

Some accounts credit Browning's tactical talent and carrier operations experience with winning the battle of Midway. According to these, on the morning of 4 June 1942 Spruance wanted to wait to launch attack aircraft until the Japanese ships were within 100 miles (160 km). Spruance's biographer Thomas Buell disagrees, saying that Spruance had always planned to launch as early as possible. According to naval historian John Lundstrom, "Morison misunderstood the time expressed in the TF 16 war diary" and "created the fiction of Spruance's supposed desire to delay the launch. It did not arise from Browning's wartime reputation or from any recollections by participants."

Despite last-minute tactical changes in the Japanese fleet's path of advance and U.S. operational delays after launch that forced them to improvise in the air, dive bombers from the U.S. carrier task force managed to find and bomb three of the four Japanese aircraft carriers while they were at their most vulnerable (re-arming and refueling aircraft on the flight decks), setting the carriers on fire and winning the battle in the space of 10 minutes. This confirmed the analysis Browning had first presented in his 1936 tactical thesis. Critically low on fuel by then, 18 of those dive bombers failed to return. By the end of the day, the task force's dive bombers had sunk all four of the big carriers Japan sent to Midway. Before it was sunk, however, the fourth Japanese carrier launched a successful air attack on the Yorktown, damaging it further and contributing to its ultimate loss. Losses suffered by the U.S. carriers' torpedo bomber squadrons were even worse than the dive bombers' losses. Carrying unreliable torpedoes and attacking low, slow and unescorted due to a series of snafus similar to those that plagued the dive bombers, the torpedo bombers had been easy prey for the Japanese carriers' defending Zeros. The torpedo squadrons were almost completely wiped out (37 of 41 aircraft lost); Torpedo Squadron 8 had exactly one survivor. But with no aircraft carriers left, Admiral Yamamoto's large surviving fleet returned to Japan. The U.S. had won at Midway, and with a high cost.

By early afternoon on June 5, Admiral Spruance knew Yamamoto's fleet was retreating. Concerned that at least one Japanese carrier might still be afloat, Spruance ordered Task Force 16 to pursue and attack. Browning prepared an ambitious attack plan, to arm dive bombers with the heaviest bombs available and launch the planes at the extreme limit of their operational range. Air Group Six commander Wade McClusky and two of his senior pilots objected vehemently to this unrealistic attack plan, which provided no margin for error. All three pilots had flown dive bombers in the successful attack on the morning of June 4, and all three would later be awarded the Navy Cross for it. McClusky had landed on Enterprise with no more than two gallons of fuel left, and other dive-bomber pilots in the air group had ditched their planes in the ocean after running out of fuel. After hearing McClusky outline the solid reasons for their objection, then listening patiently to a heated discussion between Browning and the normally soft-spoken McClusky, Admiral Spruance sided with the pilots. The planes took off with the lighter bombs (500 lb. instead of 1000 lb.), and took off an hour later than specified in the original plan. Events during the subsequent attack confirmed that in this instance LCDR McClusky and the other two pilots had been right.

Enterprise returned to Pearl Harbor on 13 June 1942.

=== Guadalcanal ===
Unfortunately, Browning continued to be a man of tremendous contradictions. At this moment of triumph, in the summer of 1942, he had an affair with the wife of a fellow officer, Commander Francis Massie Hughes. Combined with his drinking and unstable temperament, this breach of trust would eventually help to derail his career. But Captain Browning resumed combat duties in October 1942 when Halsey was given command of the South Pacific theater, where Allied fortunes had gone from bad to worse. Browning's tactical advice as chief of staff helped Halsey achieve the command miracle in the Solomon Islands that did much to turn the tide in the Pacific.

Like Midway, the Guadalcanal Campaign was another critical turning point in the Pacific war. The first major offensive by combined Allied forces against Japanese-held territory, it was a desperate ongoing sea, air, and ground campaign that required continual, almost daily, aircraft action. Repeated Japanese counterstrikes were repelled while Halsey ran the entire South Pacific Force – including U.S. and Allied army, navy and marine forces – from his headquarters at Nouméa in New Caledonia, with assistance from Browning, a handful of staff officers, and some fifty bluejackets. Audacious strikes by air, land and sea, and the tenacity and sacrifices of thousands of soldiers, sailors and marines under Admiral Halsey's command led to the historic naval victory at Guadalcanal in early November 1942.

Again, Halsey generously gave Browning credit for much of his success. In a New Year's Day 1943 letter to Admiral Nimitz (CINCPAC) concerning Browning's precarious career situation, Halsey wrote, "Miles has an uncanny knack of sizing up a situation and coming out with an answer." Admitting that his chief of staff was "decidedly temperamental", Halsey begged Nimitz not to break up "this partnership" between himself and Browning, writing, "I am almost superstitious about it." Several days later, however, Browning antagonized visiting Secretary of the Navy Frank Knox, earning himself another powerful enemy who then replaced Browning over Halsey's objections. Admiral Ernest King, Chief of Naval Operations and Commander-in-Chief, United States Fleet, and another old enemy, concurred. Halsey had pushed for a promotion to Commodore for Browning, but this did not happen.

In March 1943, Browning married Jane Matthews, the woman with whom he had the 1942 affair; she was his fourth and last wife.

Browning was detached from Halsey's staff in July 1943 to become the commanding officer of the new attack carrier USS Hornet (CV-12), namesake of USS Hornet (CV-8), which had been lost in October 1942 at the Battle of the Santa Cruz Islands. During his tenure in command, USS Hornet (CV-12) took part in massive air strikes against Japanese bases in the Pacific, including Palau, Truk, and Ponape, and provided carrier-launched air support during the Allied invasion of New Guinea and the Jayapura operation, both of which began on 22 April 1944.

=== Removal from Command ===
On 13 April 1944, Rear Admiral Joseph J. Clark had hoisted his flag on Hornet as commander of Task Group 58.1, which consisted of Hornet and three Independence-class light carriers. Not long after this, during a nighttime showing of a film on Hornet's hangar deck, someone discharged a CO_{2} canister and triggered a stampede. In the chaos, two sailors fell overboard; one of them drowned. By this time, Browning had alienated several more of his superiors, including Admiral Clark and Task Force 58 commander Vice Admiral Marc Mitscher, who were waiting for Browning to make a misstep after numerous ship-handling mistakes and general insubordination. Browning was also widely hated by his subordinates, especially the pilots, who held him responsible for numerous crashes as he enforced an unrealistically short take-off distance for the Curtiss SB2C Helldiver, which he based on the manufacturer's theoretical claims instead of the pilots' own practical experience with as-built aircraft on the carrier. When Browning refused to have a boat lowered to rescue the drowning sailors despite Admiral Clark's urgent recommendation that he do so, a board of investigation was ordered, which led to Browning's removal from command. The ensuing ruin of his career, which Morison called "one of the great wastes to the American prosecution of the war", may have had little to do with combat results but had a great deal to do with flaws in his leadership. Browning was removed from command of Hornet in May 1944 and reassigned to the Command and General Staff College at Fort Leavenworth, Kansas, where he taught carrier battle tactics during the final months of the war.

=== After World War II ===
Browning toured Japan in 1949, and stated that radiation damage from the atomic bombs was a "myth". He pointed to gardens and a number of tall chimneys left standing in Hiroshima and Nagasaki as "proof" that there were no long-term effects from the blasts.

Browning retired from active duty on January 1, 1947, and was retroactively promoted to rear admiral (upper half). He was appointed New Hampshire's Civil Defense Director in 1950, where he devised a plan wherein 500,000 displaced residents of Boston could be housed in New Hampshire private homes in the event of disaster. Browning resigned from this post in 1952.

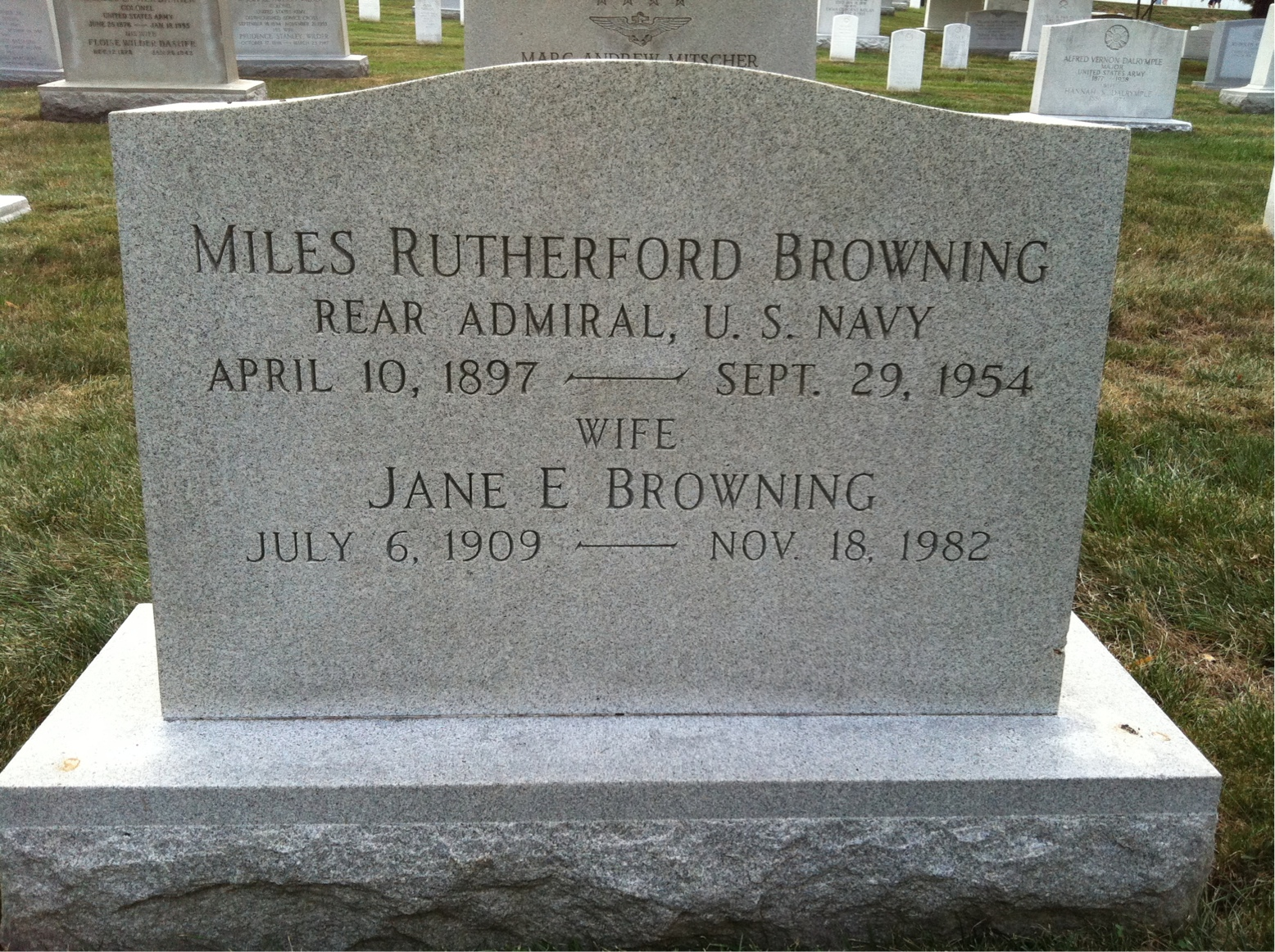
Grave at Arlington National Cemetery

On September 29, 1954, Browning died of systemic lupus erythematosus at Chelsea Naval Hospital in Boston. He was buried on October 6, 1954, at Arlington National Cemetery.

=== Fictional portrayals ===
In the 1976 film Midway, Browning was portrayed by actor Biff McGuire. In the 1988 TV-mini series War and Remembrance, Episode 3, Browning was portrayed by actor Michael McGuire. In the 2019 film Midway Browning was portrayed by actor Eric Davis. In the 2019 film Dauntless: The Battle of Midway, Browning was portrayed by actor C. Thomas Howell.

== Awards and decorations ==

Naval Aviator Badge
Navy Distinguished Service Medal	Silver Star	
Navy Presidential Unit Citation w/ 3/16" bronze star	World War I Victory Medal w/ Atlantic Fleet Clasp	American Defense Service Medal w/ Fleet Clasp
American Campaign Medal	Asiatic-Pacific Campaign Medal w/ 3/16" silver star and 3/16" bronze star	World War II Victory Medal

- Naval Flight Officer Badge

== Personal life ==
Browning was married three times.

On May 20, 1922, Browning married San Francisco socialite Cathalene Isabella Parker (1906–1987), stepdaughter of Vice Admiral Clark H. Woodward. From 1922 to January 1924, Browning served as Senior Patrol Officer on the cruiser USS Charleston and the destroyer USS Thompson, operating out of Naval Station San Diego. During that time, his only daughter, Cathalene Parker Browning, was born in San Diego (her son is the American comedian Chevy Chase).

After his divorce from Parker, Browning married Marie Héloïse Barbin (1907–2005) in June 1931.

In 1943, he married Katherine Jane Eynon (1909–1982). They were married for the rest of his life. In 1970, Jane Browning testified to Congress about the small widow's pension she received and her penury.

== See also ==
- History of United States Naval Operations in World War II
- Mariana and Palau Islands campaign
- Midway order of battle
- Pacific War
- Pacific Theater of Operations
- The Two-Ocean War
