= Broening =

Broening is a surname. Notable people with the surname include:

- H. Lyman Broening (1882–1983), American cinematographer
- Marius Broening (born 1983), German sprinter
- William Frederick Broening (1870–1953), American politician

== See also ==
- Browning (name)
