= Massachusetts historical markers =

Historical plaques in the U.S. state of Massachusetts

A marker placed by the Massachusetts Bay Colony Tercentenary Commission about the city of Watertown

The U.S. state of Massachusetts features a number of historical markers placed by several organizations, most notably the Massachusetts Bay Colony Tercentenary Commission. Other markers have been placed by private organizations, such as The Bostonian Society, and others are associated with sites such as those along the Freedom Trail, the Black Heritage Trail, and the Emerald Necklace.

== Massachusetts Bay Colony Tercentenary Commission markers ==
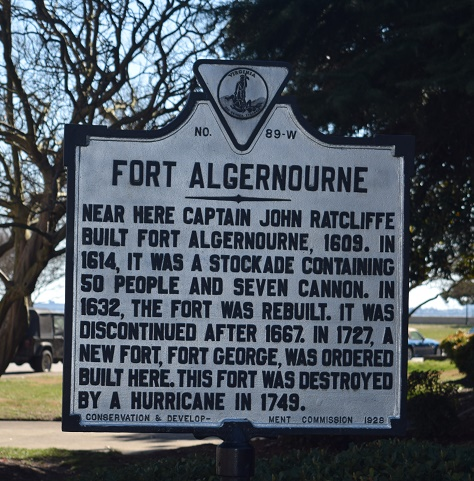
Example of a Virginia historical marker

Plans by the Massachusetts legislature to form a commission to coordinate "suitable methods to be used to celebrate the tercentenary (Note: 300th anniversary) of the founding of the Massachusetts Bay Colony" (Note: The year 1630 is notable and significant for the arrival of the Winthrop Fleet, although the Charter of the Massachusetts Bay Company was issued prior.) were reported in December 1928, with $125,000 ($2.34 million in 2025) to be appropriated. For historical markers, $15,000 ($281,250 in 2025) was allocated, for the purpose of "indicating the ancient ways of the Puritan times and the structures or places relating to or associated with the early settlements within the commonwealth." Intent to erect the first 100 markers, approximately, during 1930 was announced in December 1929, with the markers to be based on "the form of those of the State of Virginia." (Note: Virginia is one of the four U.S. states that use the term "Commonwealth" in its official name, along with Massachusetts, Kentucky, and Pennsylvania.)

Markers placed by the Massachusetts Bay Colony Tercentenary Commission were to be located "as far north as Amesbury, west to Deerfield and Greenfield, east to Rockport and south to Quincy." The markers were described as "of cast iron, two-faced, with raised lettering and border in black against an aluminum-gray background" while also featuring the state seal in bas-relief. The markers, which are mounted on posts, were made in two sizes: some are 45 inches (110 cm) tall while others are 35 inches (89 cm) tall; all are 36 inches (91 cm) wide.

The commission's official advisor was Samuel Eliot Morison, a historian and professor at Harvard University. (Note: Morison later served in the United States Navy and wrote the 15-volume History of United States Naval Operations in World War II.) Approximately 250 markers were planned. Ultimately, 275 markers were placed, located in 95 cities and towns spanning nine different counties. Content of the markers varied, with the most common topic—per a 2011 review by a reporter with The Boston Globe—being "settler sites and pathways" (114 markers) followed by "Native American sites and pathways" (43) and then "Native attacks" (31).

Markers by county
County	Quantity
Middlesex	84
Essex	83
Worcester	33
Plymouth	23
Norfolk	21
Franklin	12
Suffolk	10
Hampshire	6
Hampden	3

Markers by topic
Topic	Quantity (Note: The quantities sum to 296 as some of the 275 markers were counted under more than one topic.)
Settler sites and pathways	114
Native American sites and pathways	43
Native attacks	31
Early industry	22
Revolutionary War	14
Ships and fishing	13
Conversion of natives	10
Education	10
Literary references	9
Witchcraft	8
Explorers / planters	7
Business / commerce	6
Politics	6
Puritan doctrine	3

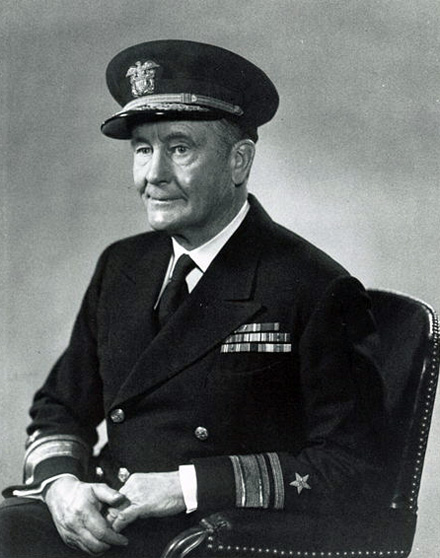
Samuel Eliot Morison

An inventory compiled in 2011 found that 146 markers were still standing, while 128 were no longer in place, with the latter figure including "seven replica markers and nine in storage." A news report in 2019 noted that the Massachusetts Department of Transportation (MassDOT) had "located 174 of the original 275 markers."

=== Criticism ===
In January 1931, an article in The Springfield Sunday Union and Republican raised question about "the basis of selection of historic places in the western part of the state"—no markers were placed in or around Springfield—pointing out the significance of the Agawam colony of 1636, which had been established by William Pynchon.

Nearly a century after they were erected, the markers' content has received some criticism for "firsting", the "practice by which local histories claim indigenous places as sites of European beginnings while relegating Native people to a vanished past." One writer deemed the markers to be "one man’s vision of the Puritans", pointing out that in the early 1930s Morison "was in the midst of a passionate campaign to rehabilitate the public reputation of Puritans."

In January 2024, the three remaining markers in the town of Concord—titled “The Milldam", “Jethro’s Tree”, and “The First Settlement”—were removed per a vote of the town's select board acting upon recommendation from the town's Diversity, Equity and Inclusion Commission and Historical Commission, which found the markers to be "problematic and antithetical to the inclusive goals of the Town of Concord."

=== Gallery ===
This section includes photographs of some of the markers. Markers are listed alphabetically by the name of the city or town where located, and the title of each marker is given.

Steerage Rock (Brimfield)

Oldest House in Cambridge

Samuel de Champlain (Gloucester)

Eunice Williams (Greenfield)

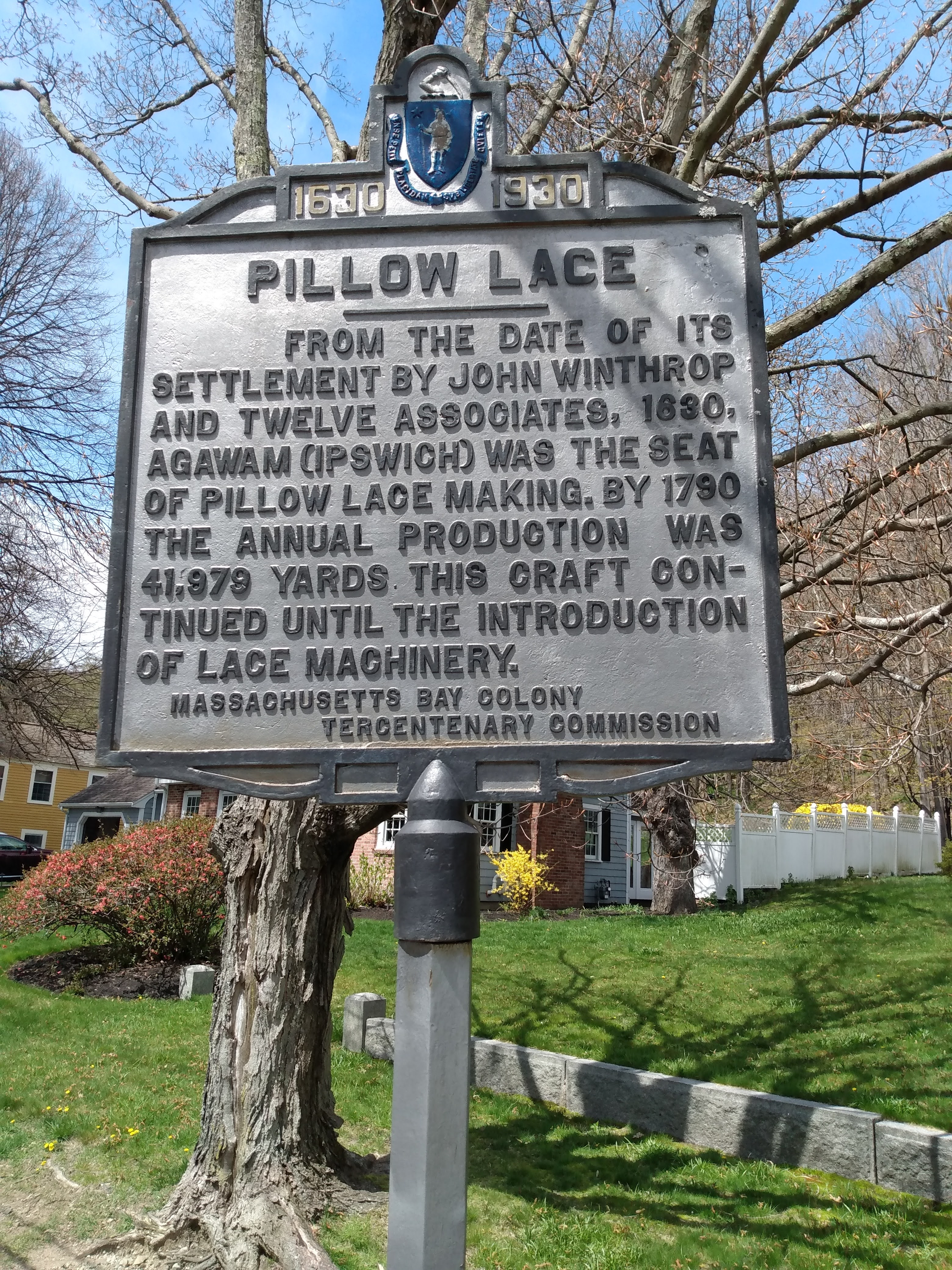
Pillow Lace (Ipswich)

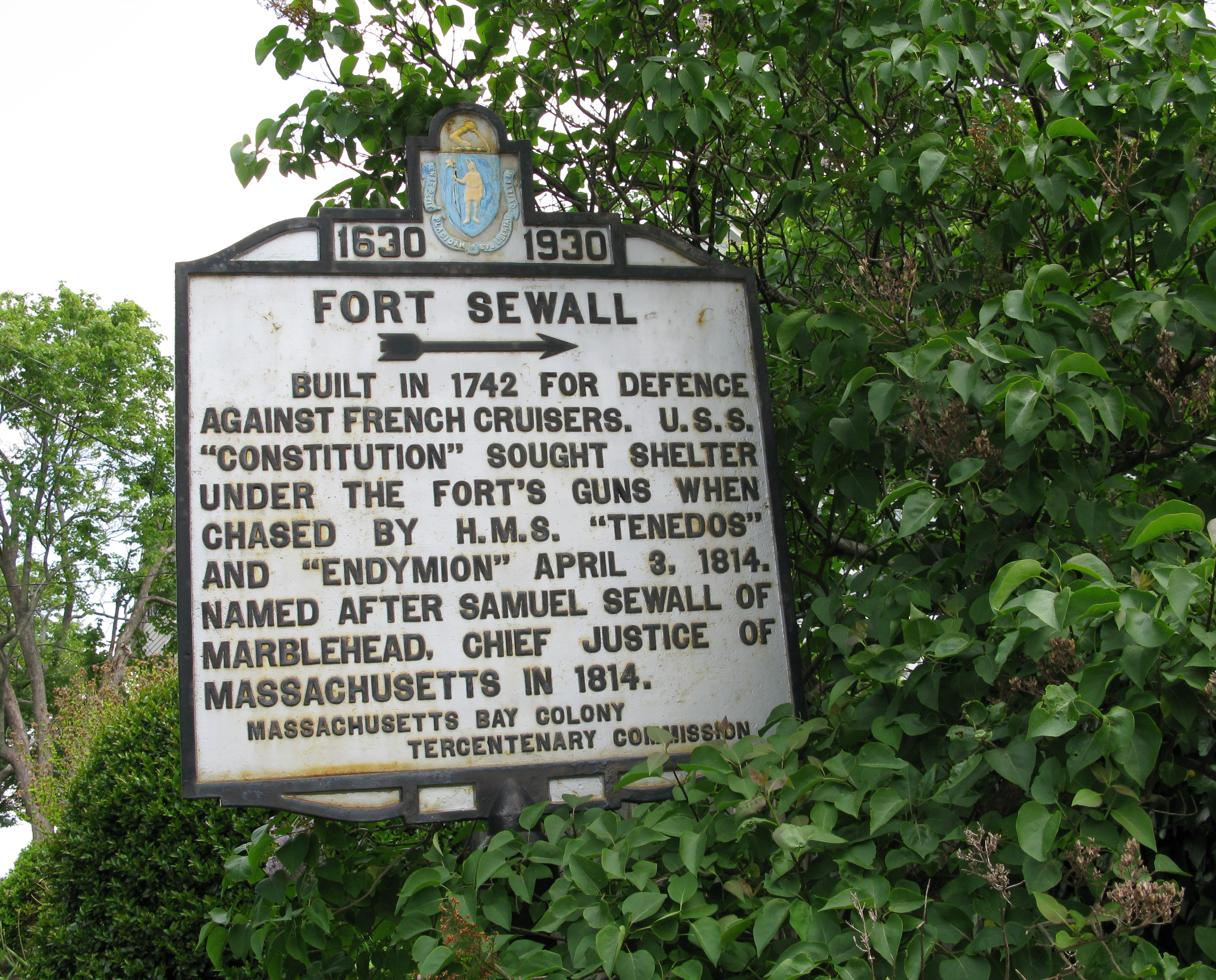
Fort Sewall (Marblehead)

Clara Barton's Birthplace (North Oxford)

First Settlement (Northfield)

== Other markers ==
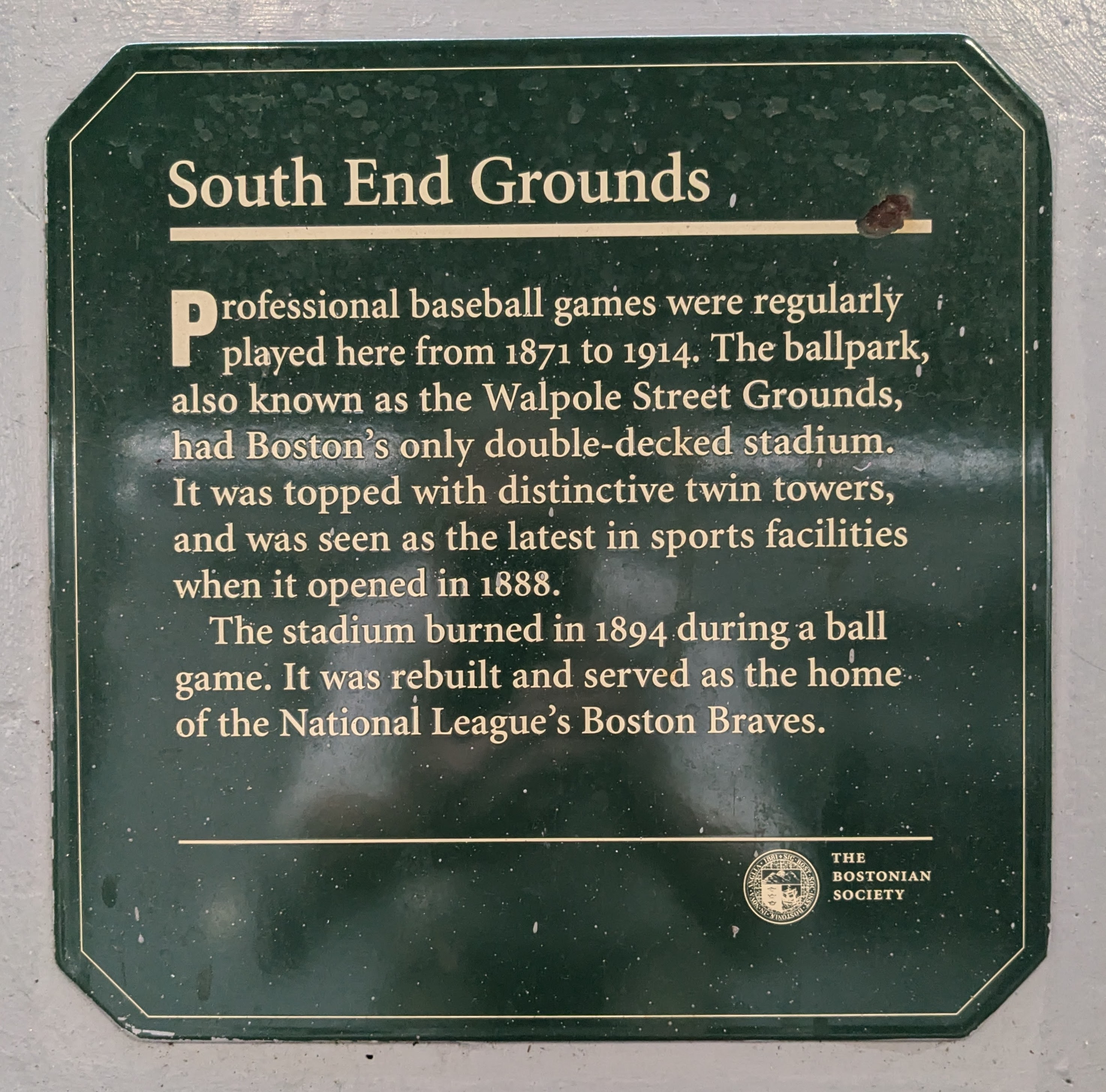
A plaque commemorating South End Grounds, placed by The Bostonian Society

A number of private organizations and local governments have also erected historical markers in Massachusetts. One example is The Bostonian Society, which has placed various plaques in Boston. Some markers placed by the Society note significant events such as the Great Boston Fire of 1872, the Great Molasses Flood of 1919, and the Cocoanut Grove fire of 1942. Other markers placed by the Society provide the history of notable buildings such as The Parker House, the Emerson Majestic Theatre. and the First Harrison Gray Otis House.

== See also ==
- New Hampshire historical markers
