= Ethel Browning =

Ethel Browning may refer to:

- Ethel Browning (toxicologist) (1891–1969), British toxicologist
- Ethel Browning (actress) (1877–1965), American actress
