= Harold Shurtleff =

American painter (1883–1938)

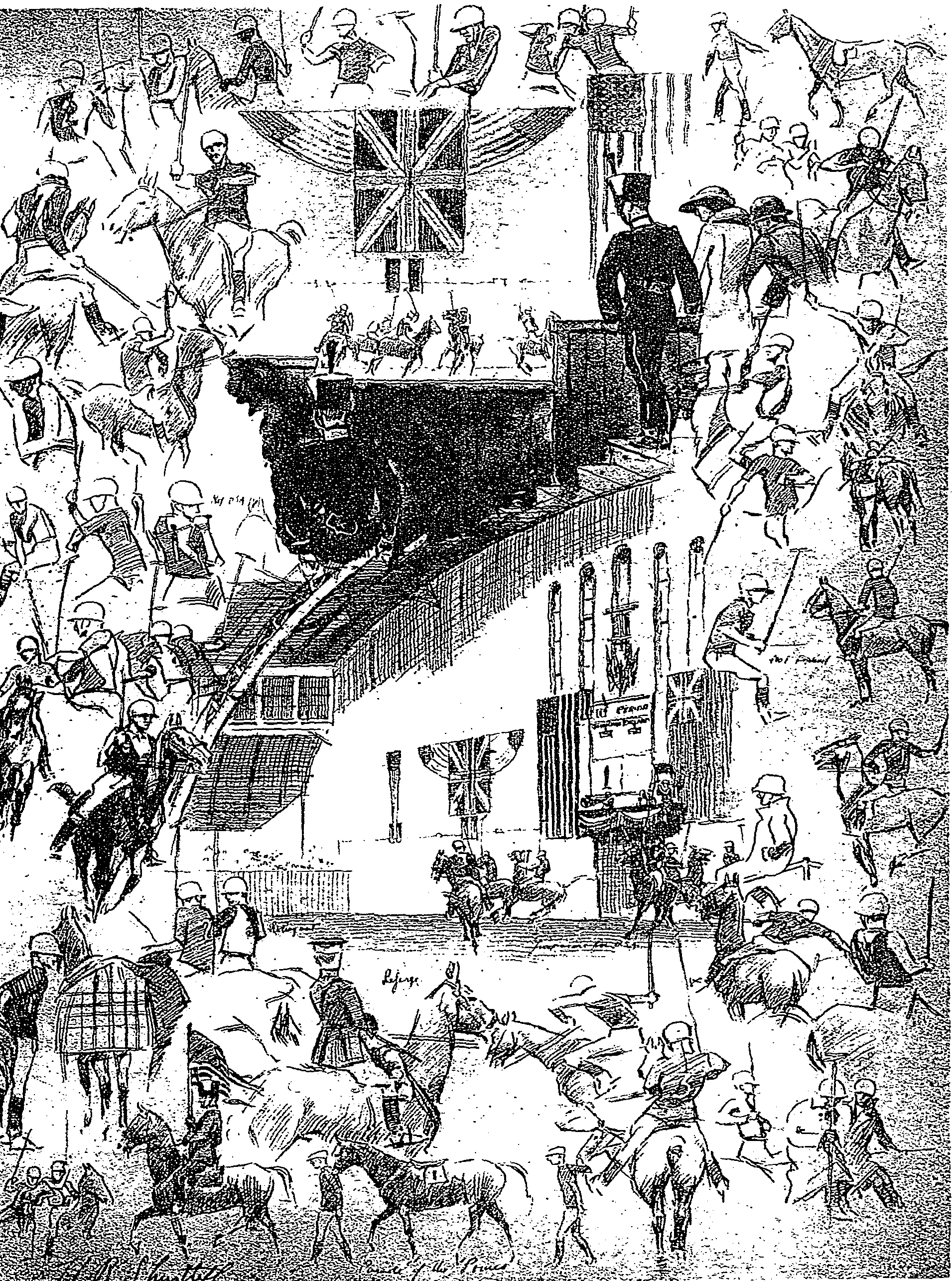
- Born: January 6, 1883; Concord, New Hampshire, United States
- Died: December 6, 1938 (aged 55); Canton, Massachusetts, United States
- Occupation: Painter

Harold Robert Shurtleff (January 6, 1883 – December 6, 1938) was an American painter.

Shurtleff was an alumnus of Harvard University. He worked as head of the restoration department at Colonial Williamsburg. He also wrote a book titled The Log Cabin Myth: A Study of the Early Dwellings of the English Colonists in North America. This book showed that log cabins were only present in the Delaware valley, and not elsewhere in colonial north America. His book dealt both with what people in the North American colonies really used as residences, and also with why and how the myth of the log cabin had come to be. The book was published two years after Shurtleff's death and was completed and edited by Samuel Eliot Morison.

His artistic work formed part of the painting event in the art competition at the 1932 Summer Olympics.
