= Browning =

Browning may refer to:

== Arts and entertainment ==
- The Browning, an American electronicore band
- Browning, a set of variations by the composer William Byrd

== Places ==
- Browning, Georgia, USA
- Browning, Illinois, USA
- Browning, Kentucky, USA
- Browning, Missouri, USA
- Browning, Montana, USA
- Browning, Texas, an unincorporated community in Smith County, Texas, USA
- Browning, Wisconsin, USA
- Browning, Saskatchewan, Canada
- Rural Municipality of Browning No. 34, Saskatchewan, Canada, a rural municipality
- 25851 Browning, a minor planet

== People ==
- Browning (name)

== Science and technology ==
- Browning machine gun (disambiguation), a family of guns designed by John Browning
- Browning Arms Company, initially marketing the sporting designs of John Browning
- MV Browning, a coaster

== Food ==
- Browning (cooking), the cooking process that removes excessive fat from meat and changes its color to a light brown
  - Gravy browning, a substance used to darken and flavour gravies, soups etc.
- Food browning, chemical reactions affecting foods such as apples
- Maillard reaction, type of chemical reaction causing the browning of some foods

== Other uses ==
- Browning (steel), a surface finishing process to increase corrosion resistance
- Browning School, a private boys' school in New York City

== See also ==
- Browns (disambiguation)
- Brown (disambiguation)
- Justice Browning (disambiguation)
- The Brownings (disambiguation)
