= Joanna Richardson =

English writer, translator and journalist (1925–2008)

Joanna Leah Richardson (8 August 1925 – 7 March 2008) was an English writer, translator and journalist. She wrote 21 biographies of literary writers and poets and was awarded the Prix Goncourt de la Biographie in 1989. Richardson also contributed to various newspapers and magazines.

== Biography ==
=== Early life and education ===
Richardson was born on 8 August 1925 at 36 West Heath Drive in Golders Green, London NW11. She was the daughter of Charlotte Elsa Benjamin with whom she established a close relationship because of her strong-artistic mind. Her father Frederick Richardson, was a Captain in the Intelligence Corps during the Second World War and became fluent in Italian by working with prisoners of war in the country. Richardson was of Jewish descent. She had one brother, Martin, who was a widely commended architect. Richardson was brought up in Hampstead Garden Suburb. She was educated at the Downs School in Seaford, Sussex which was evacuated to St Ives, Cornwall during the Second World War's early phase.

Richardson was unhappy during her school years at Downs School, but gained a university place to read Modern Languages at St Anne's College, Oxford. Despite her degree going poorly, she studied for a Bachelor of Letters degree and later an unsuccessful doctorate under literary critic Dr Enid Starkie. Nevertheless, Starkie's influence possibly helped Richardson gain re-admittance into St. Anne's College as an "advance student" and worked as the critic's research assistant on her biography of the poet Charles Baudelaire which was published in 1957.

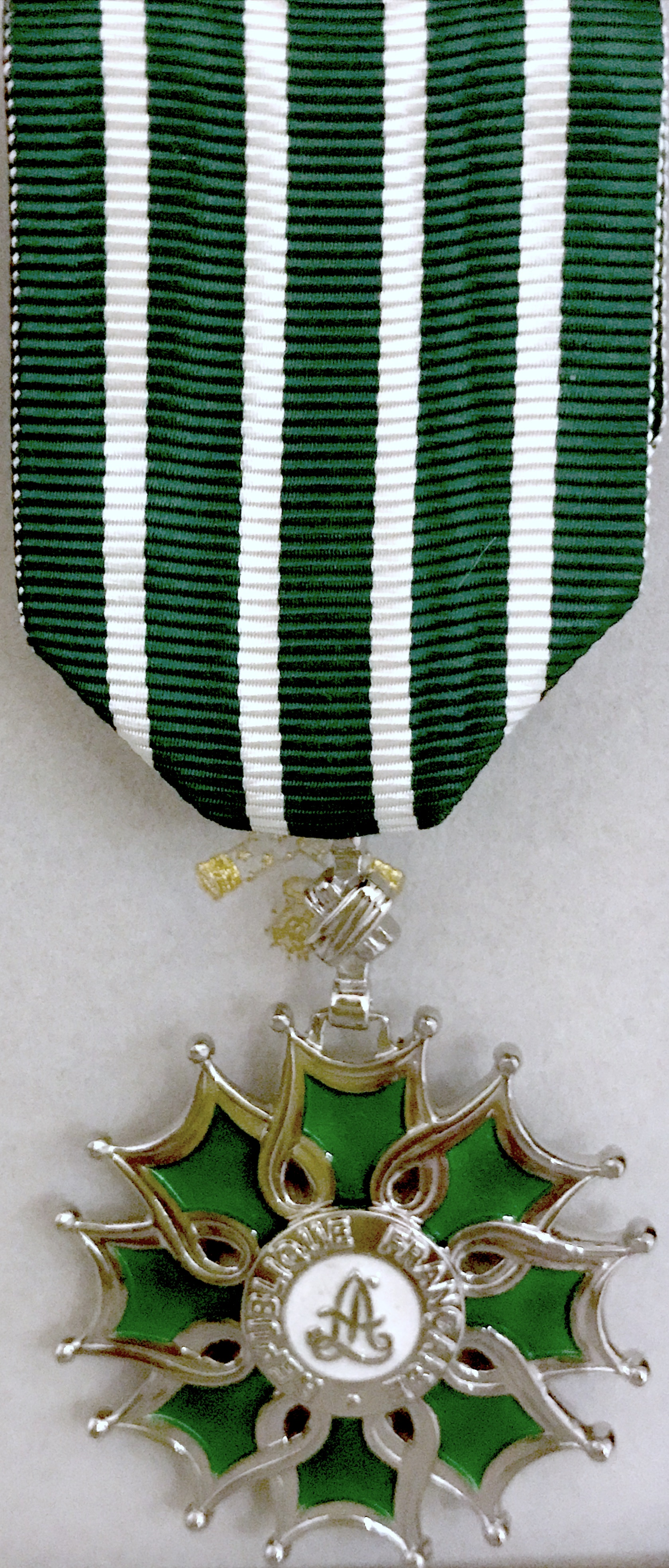
Chevalière des Arts et des Letrres

=== Career and death ===
She began her career in 1952 by writing about Fanny Brawne after discovering "a cache of family photographs in some dusty archive". Richardson published her first French literature biography in 1958 called Theophile Gautier: His Life & Times. For the biography Richardson spent a large amount of time researching family papers and visiting libraries. Having been active in the Royal Society of Literature, she was elected as a fellow of the society in 1959, and she guided the council through financial difficulties and change between the early 1960s to the mid 1980s. Richardson wrote biographies on Alfred, Lord Tennyson, Starkie and Victor Hugo in 1962, 1973 and 1976. Outside of literary work, she campaigned on issues relating to North London and wrote and broadcast on BBC Radio, where she translated plays from French, as well as conducting plays and presented features on Radio 3 and Radio 4.

Richardson contributed to various magazines and newspapers, including The Times, The Times Literary Supplement, Modern Language Review and Keats-Shelley Memorial Bulletin. She did a large amount of work for the Keats House Museum and led an unsuccessful campaign to get Camden London Borough Council to recognise its duty to maintain the museum's condition. In 1987 Richardson was appointed Chevalier de I'Ordre des Arts et des Lettres. Richardson earned her the Prix Goncourt de la Biographie in 1989 on her biography of Judith Gautier, the first time an English writer was awarded the accolade. She was surprised to be selected by the Académie Goncourt for the Prix Goncourt and noted in her acceptance speech that the award's creators did not like Britain nor women.

Richardson received a Bachelor of Letters (BLitt) degree from the University of Oxford in 2005. She died at Royal Free Hospital in Camden, London on 7 March 2008 at the age of 82 after living the last years of her life with Parkinson's disease. In her lifetime she had written 21 biographies, and was working on a biography of Gustave Flaubert at the time of her death. On 19 March, Richardson was cremated at Kensal Green Cemetery.

== Legacy ==
Richardson described a biography's purpose as "a search for truth – you ought to know what sort of marmalade the subject eats for breakfast". Her translations were considered by many to be her greatest work but her biographies were subject to mixed reception in the United Kingdom. She was known to be an outspoken figure and her persistence resulted in her being not universally liked.

== List of published works ==
- Fanny Brawne: Fair Love of Keats (1952)
- Rachel (1956) – about the French actress Rachel Felix
- Theophile Gautier: His Life and Times (1958)
- Sarah Bernhardt (1959)
- The Disastrous Marriage: A Study of George IV and Caroline of Brunswick (1960)
- My Dearest Uncle: A Life of Leopold First King of the Belgians (1961)
- The Pre-Eminent Victorian: A Study of Tennyson (1962)
- The Everlasting Spell: A Study of Keats and his Friends (1963)
- The Young Lewis Carroll (1963)
- The Young Pasteur (1964)
- Edward Lear (1965) "Writers and their Work" series, no. 184
- George IV: A Portrait (1966)
- The Courtesans: The Demi-monde in 19th Century France (1967)
- Princess Mathilde (1969)
- The Bohemians: La Vie de Boheme in Paris 1830–1914 (1969)
- Verlaine (1971)
- La Vie Parisienne 1852–1870 (1971)
- Louis XIV (1973)
- Enid Starkie (1973)
- The Regency (1973)
- Verlaine: Selected Poems (trans. 1974)
- Stendhal (1974)
- Victor Hugo (1976)
- Victoria and Albert: A Study of a Marriage (1977)
- Sarah Bernhardt and Her World (1977)
- Zola (1978)
- Keats and His Circle: An Album of Portraits (1980)
- Gustave Dore. A Biography (1980)
- Letters from Lambeth: The Correspondence of the Reynolds Family with John Freeman Milward Dovaston 1808–1815 (ed. 1981)
- The Life and Letters of John Keats (1981)
- Paris Under Siege 1870–71 (ed., trans. 1982) – a journal of events kept by contemporaries
- Colette (1983)
- The Brownings: A Biography compiled from Contemporary Sources (1986)
- Judith Gautier (1986)
- Portrait of a Bonaparte: The Life and Times of Joseph-Napoleon Primoli 1851–1927 (1987)
- Lord Byron and some of his Contemporaries (1988)
- Baudelaire (1994)
