= Browning machine gun =

Browning machine guns are a family of machine gun designs by John Browning, a prolific American weapon designer.

These include:

- M1895 Colt–Browning machine gun, based on a design dating to 1889, was the first successful gas-operated machine gun to enter service.
- M1917 Browning machine gun, a family of water-cooled machine guns in .30-'06
- M1918 Browning Automatic Rifle, or its variants
- M1919 Browning machine gun, a family of air-cooled machine guns in .30-'06
- M1921 Browning machine gun, a family of water-cooled machine guns in .50 BMG
- M2 Browning machine gun, a family of air-cooled machine guns in .50 BMG

A related term:

- .50 BMG or .50 Browning Machine Gun, a large caliber machine gun round

== See also ==
- Browning (disambiguation)
