= George B. Morison =

American sportsman

George Burnap Morison (May 9, 1861 – January 20, 1932) was an American sportsman who was the president of the Boston Athletic Association from 1903 to 1915.

== Early life ==
Morison was born on May 9, 1861, in Baltimore. He prepared for college at the Adams Academy, where he was a member of the school's football team. He attended Harvard College, where he was captain of the freshman football team and played three seasons (1880–1882) on the varsity squad. He also was a member of the Crimson track team and won the IC4A mile-run championship at Manhattan Field in 1882 and 1883. After graduating, he went into the cotton and textile business. In 1901, he organized the firm of Morison & Vaughan.

== Boston Athletic Association ==
The Boston Athletic Association began in 1887 at the suggestion of John Boyle O'Reilly. When the club was officially organized on March 15, 1887, Morison was elected to its governing committee. Christian Eberhard was named the B.A.A.'s first gymnasium director at Morison's recommendation. Morison was elected vice president in 1900 and in 1903, he succeeded Frederick W. Smith as president. He did not seek reelection in 1915 and was succeeded by A. Paul Keith.

== Harvard ==
In 1891, Morison was one the stewards at the Harvard-Yale-Oxford-Cambridge track meet. In 1912, he helped the reorganize the Harvard Varsity Club. The following year, he was elected president following the death of Frederick W. Thayer. He remained president until his death in 1932.

== Board of bath trustees ==
In 1908, Morison was appointed to Boston's board of bath trustees by mayor George A. Hibbard. He was confirmed by the board of aldermen on September 24, 1908, for a term ending on April 30, 1912. In 1910, the trustees voted to suspend superintendent Joseph B. O'Brien pending an investigation into charges made by Hibbard's successor, John F. Fitzgerald, with Morison voting in the minority. The board ultimately voted to remove O'Brien and on June 4, Morison resigned due to his "lack of confidence in the majority of the board as at present constituted and particularly in view of their recent dismissal of Supt O'Brien on evidence which in my opinion absolutely failed to justify such action". Catherine Logan, who also opposed O'Brien's removal, resigned on the same day.

== Other organizations ==
In 1891, Morison helped organize the New England branch of the Amateur Athletic Union. He was also active in the Boy Scouts of America and served on the committee that managed the Boston Council Boy Scout camp on Loon Pond in Lakeville, Massachusetts. In 1915, Morison attended the Citizens' Military Training Camp in Plattsburgh, New York.

== Personal life ==
Morison never married. He and one of his Harvard classmates, Charles H. Kip, shared an apartment on Boylston Street from 1886 until Morison's death on January 20, 1932. He was survived by several nieces and nephews, including Samuel Eliot Morison.
