= Judge Browning =

Judge Browning may refer to:

- James O. Browning (born 1956), judge of the United States District Court for the District of New Mexico
- James R. Browning (1918–2012), judge of the United States Court of Appeals for the Ninth Circuit
- William Docker Browning (1931–2008), judge of the United States District Court for the District of Arizona

== See also ==
- Justice Browning (disambiguation)
