= Jonathan Browning =

Jonathan Browning may refer to:

- Jonathan Browning (designer), American interior designer and business executive
- Jonathan Browning (inventor) (1805–1879), American inventor and gunmaker
- Jonathan Browning (UK businessman) (born 1959), president and CEO of Volkswagen Group of America

== See also ==
- John Browning (disambiguation)
