= Palazzo Primoli =

Historic Building in Rome

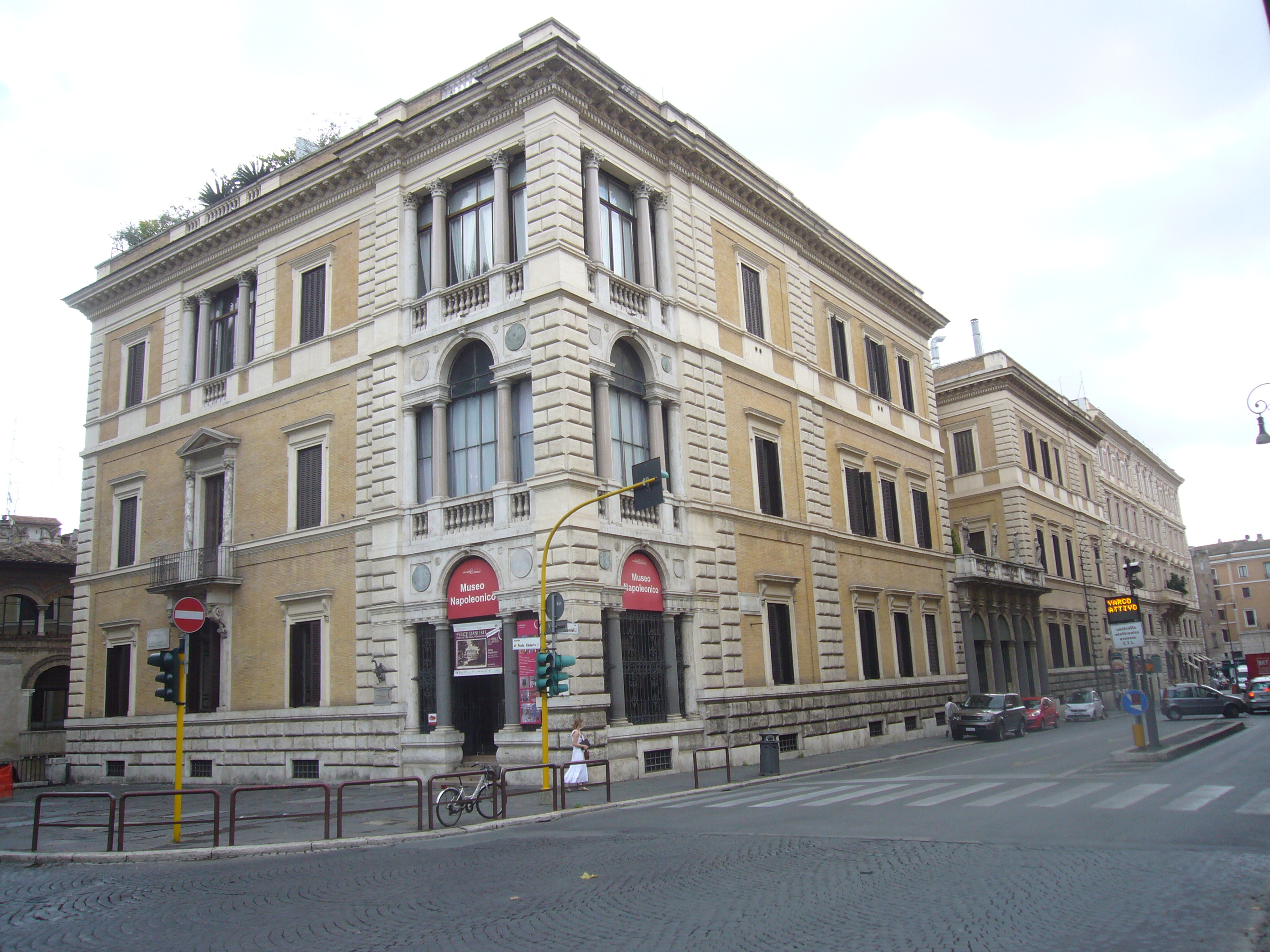
- Facade
- Click on the map to see marker

General information
- Location: Rome, Italy
- Coordinates: 41°54′06″N 12°28′19″E

Palazzo Primoli is a Palazzo in Rome, Italy. It is owned by the Fondazione Primoli and the city of Rome and houses several museums and collections. The palazzo was built in the seventeenth century. In 1901 Count Giuseppe Primoli (1851–1927) became its sole owner. He extended and partly modernised the palazzo with a new facade and entrance between 1901 and 1911. The Count's maternal grandparents were Charles Lucien Bonaparte and Zénaïde Bonaparte, and the Count brought together a collection of objects (now the Museo Napoleonico), documenting the relationship between Rome and the Bonaparte family. He also was an avid photographer. In 1927 Giuseppe Primoli donated the palazzo and his collections to the municipality of Rome.

The Museo Napoleonico is located on the palazzo's ground floor, and the third floor is occupied by the Museo Mario Praz, the former residence of Mario Praz. Also located in the palazzo is the Fondazione Primoli with the Count's library and photographic archive.

== See also ==
- Palazzo Bonaparte (Roma)
