= Giuseppe Primoli =

Italian nobleman, collector and photographer

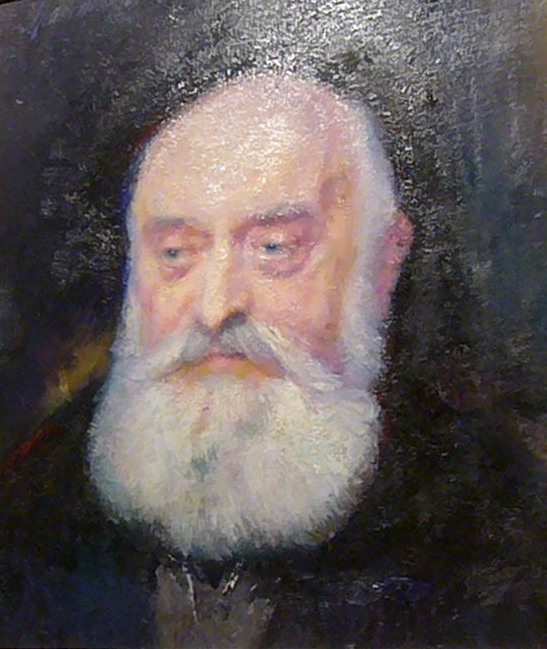
Giuseppe Primoli

Count Giuseppe Napoleone Primoli (in French, Joseph Napoléon Primoli; 2 May 1851 in Rome – 13 June 1927 in Rome) was an Italian nobleman, collector and photographer.

== Biography ==
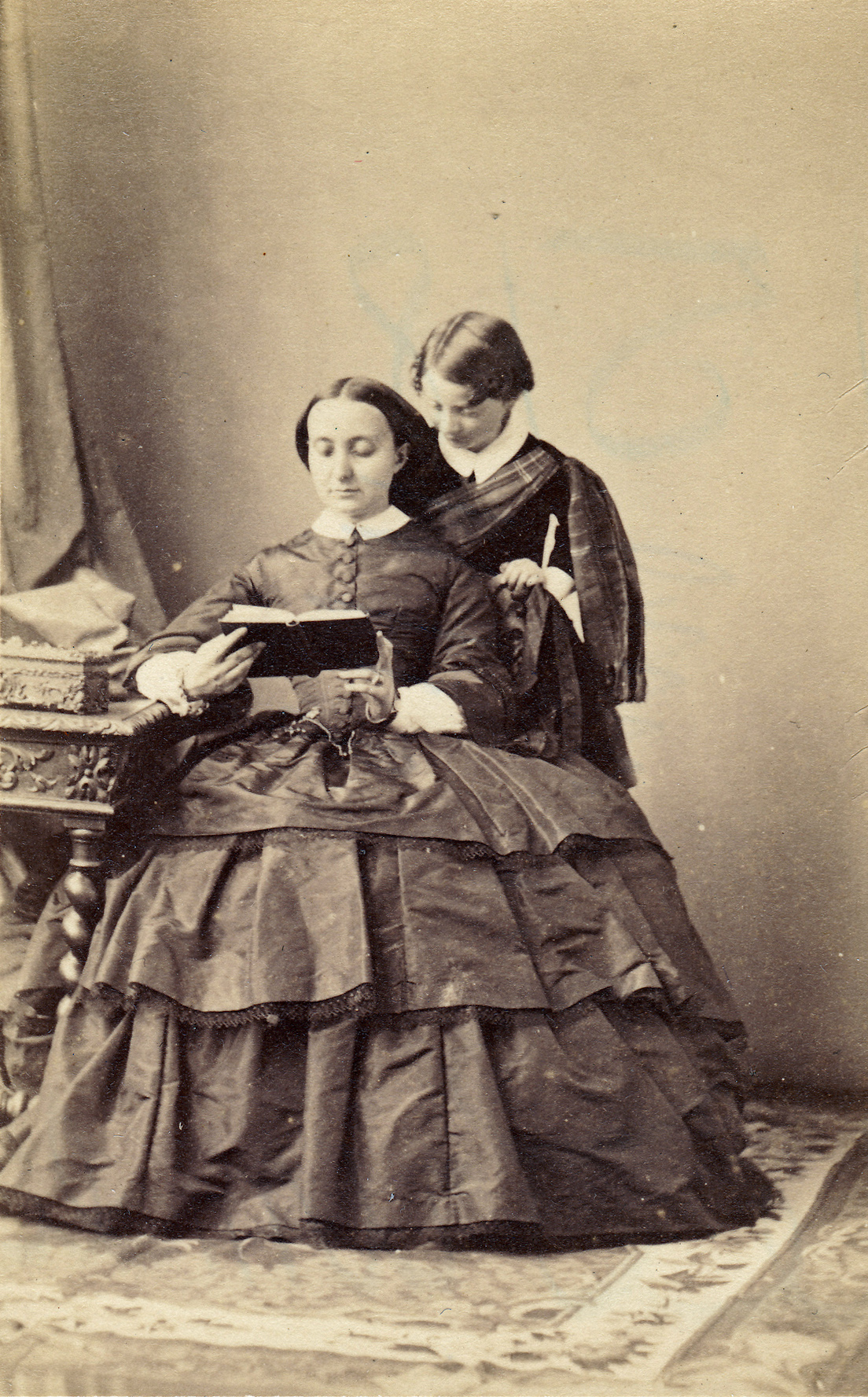
Giuseppe Primoli and his mother, Charlotte Bonaparte, 1859. Photograph by Disdéri.

Giuseppe Primoli was born in Rome, 2 May 1851. His parents were Pietro Primoli, Count of Foglia (1820–1883) and Charlotte Bonaparte ('Carlotta', 4 March 1832 – 10 September 1901). His maternal grandparents were Charles Lucien Bonaparte and Zénaïde Bonaparte.

He had two brothers, Napoleone (born 1855 in Paris–died 1882 in Rome) and Luigi (born 12 February 1858 in Paris–died 1925), who also became an amateur photographer, and who would travel to India in 1904-1906.

Giuseppe Primoli lived in Paris from 1853 to 1870. He befriended writers and artists both in Italy and France, and was host to Guy de Maupassant, Paul Bourget, Alexandre Dumas fils, Sarah Bernhardt and others in Palazzo Primoli in Rome. In 1901 he became the sole owner of the palazzo, which he enlarged and modernised between 1904 and 1911.

Primoli was a bibliophile and collector, who assembled a large collection of books and prints. He amassed a collection of books by Stendhal as well as many from the writer's library.

During the last decades of the nineteenth century, Primoli, an avid photographer, produced over 10,000 photographs. His most productive period was 1888-1894. His brother Luigi left him his photographic archive when he died 1925.

Giuseppe Primoli died 13 June 1927 in Rome, leaving his collections and Palazzo Primoli to a foundation, the Fondazione Primoli, while the Museo Napoleonico was sold to the city of Rome.

== Gallery ==
Photographs by Giuseppe Primoli

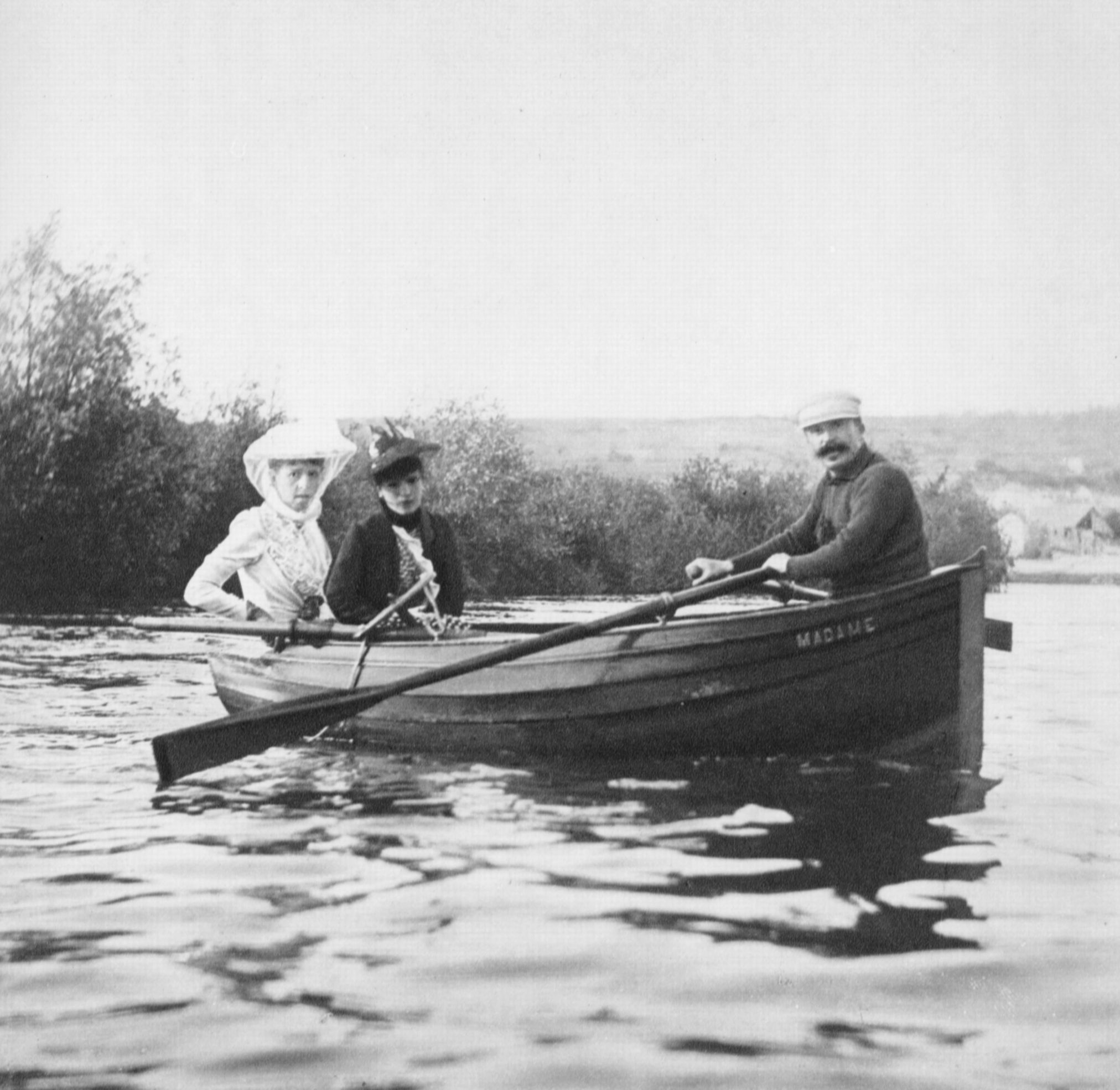
Colette Dumas Lippmann, Geneviève Straus and Guy de Maupassant, 1889.

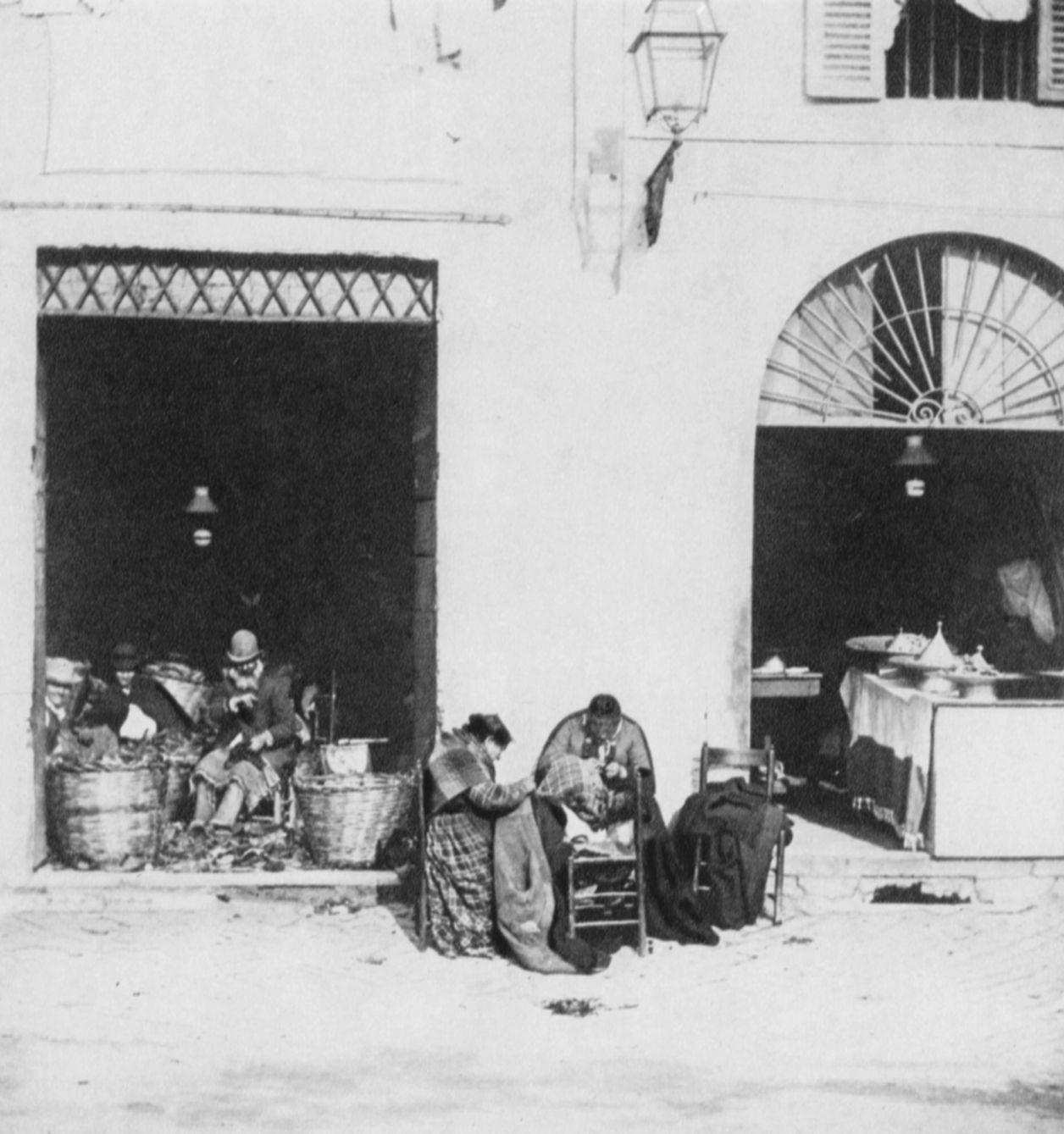
Workshop in the Ghetto, ca. 1890.

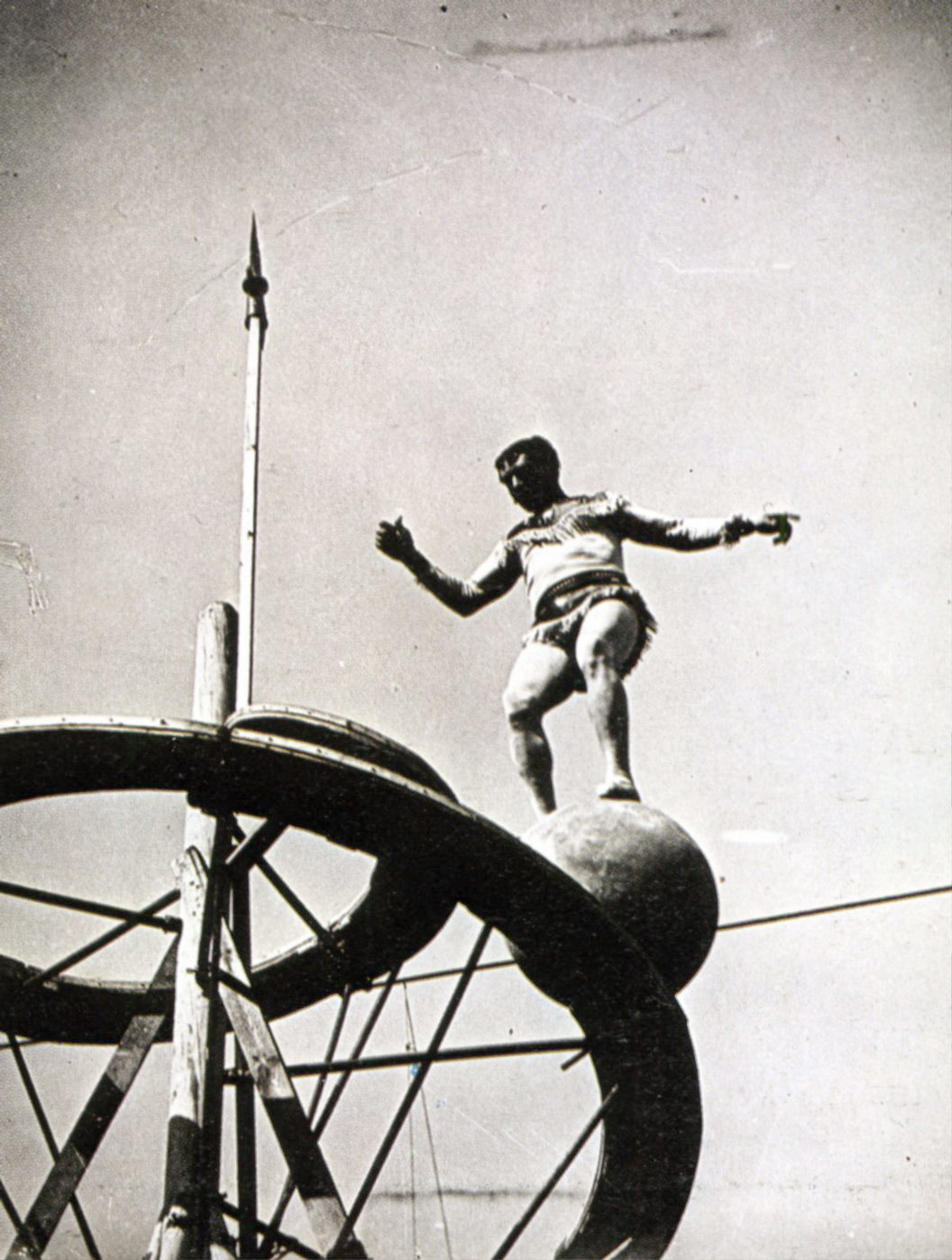
Circus artist in Rome, ca. 1890-1899.

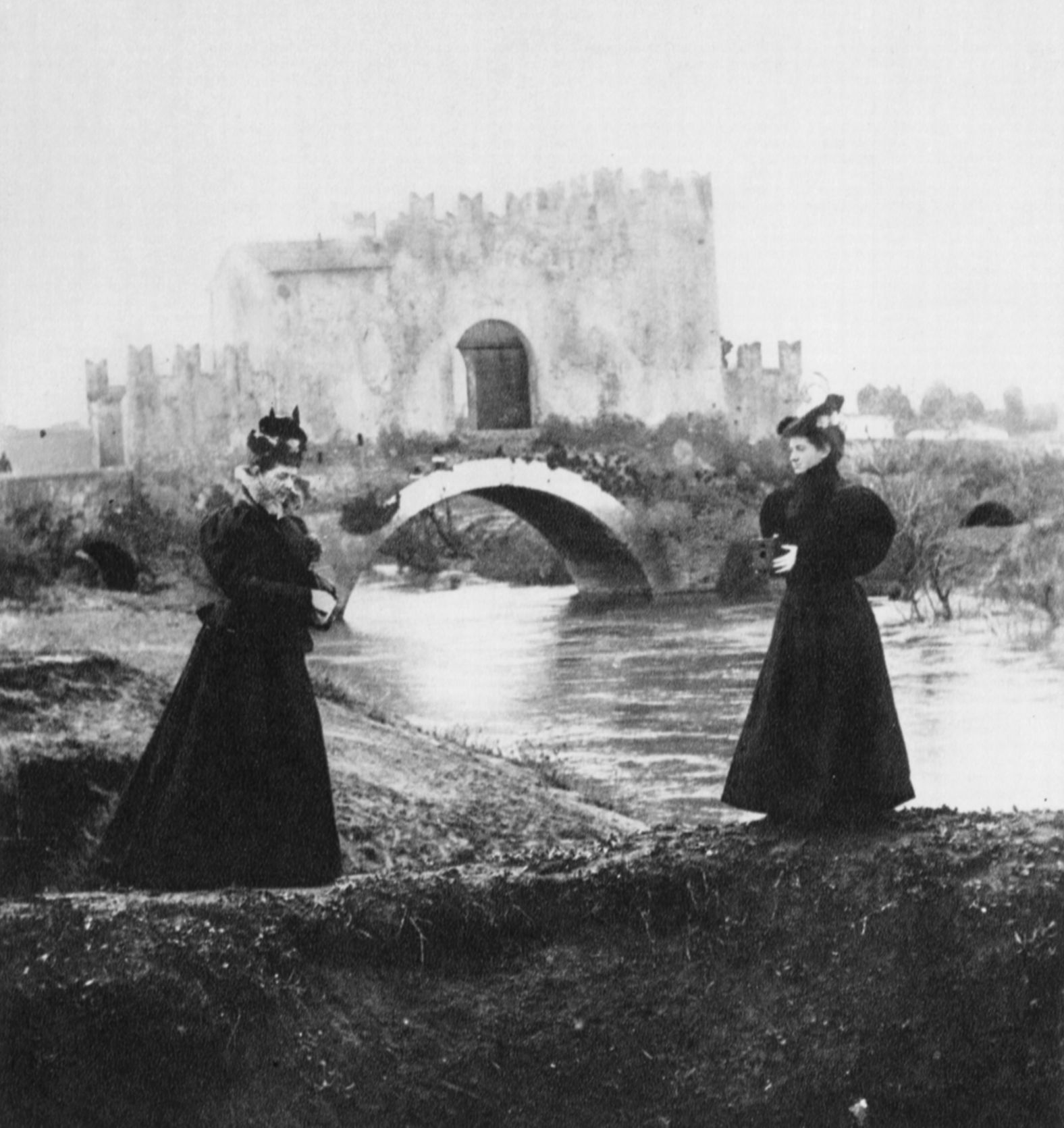
Ponte Nomentano, ca. 1896.

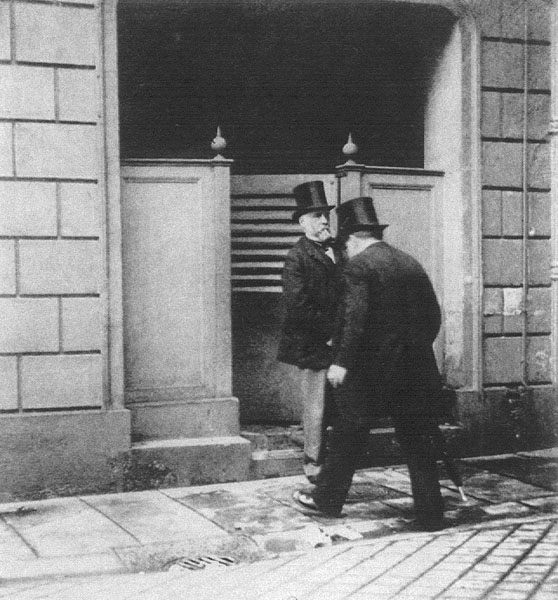
Edgar Degas emerging from a Parisian public toilet, 1889.

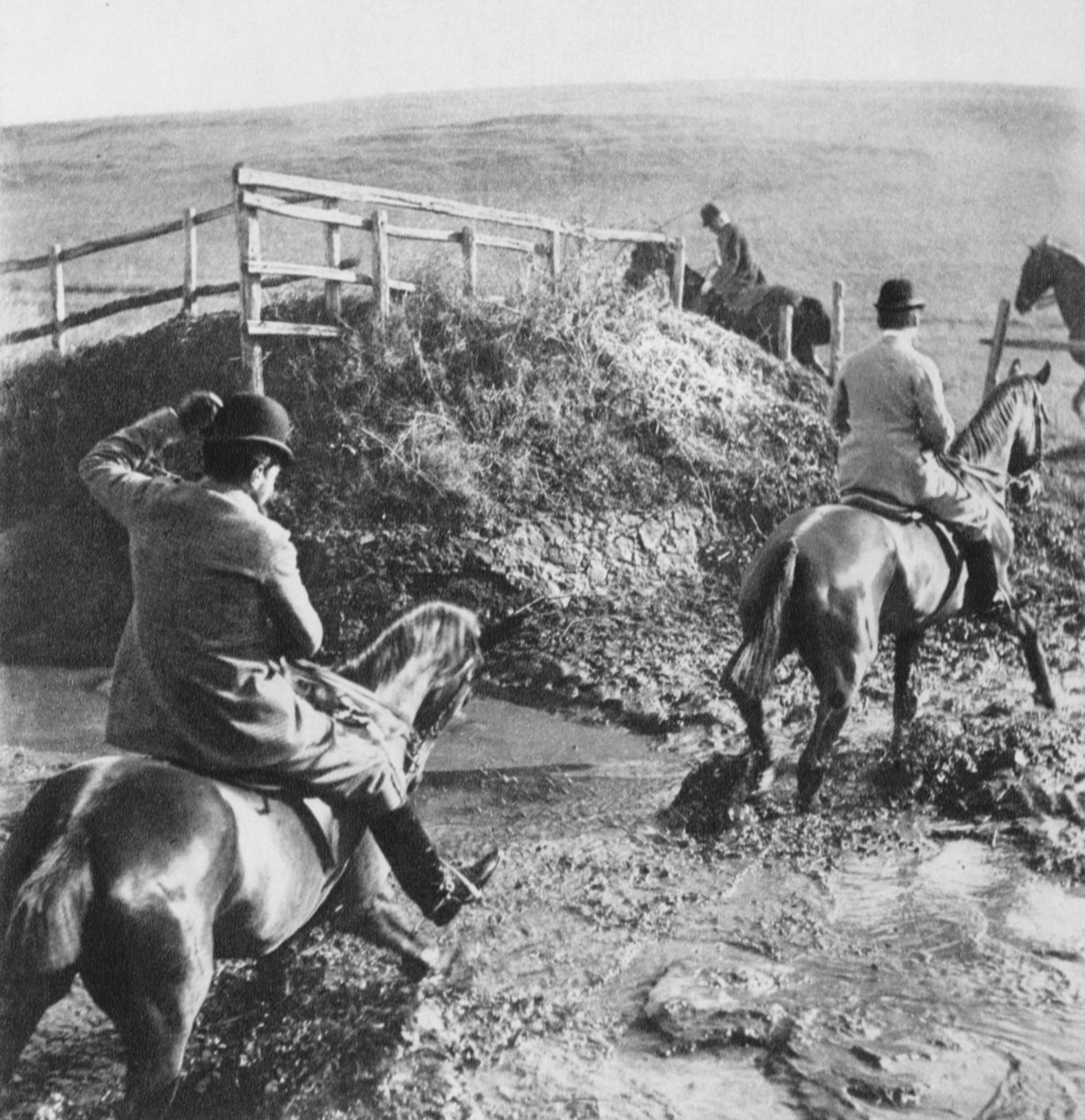
Riders wading through water, ca. 1895.

Media related to Giuseppe Primoli at Wikimedia Commons

== Bibliography ==
- Richardson, Joanna (1987). Portrait of a Bonaparte: Life and Times of Joseph-Napoleon Primoli, 1851-1927. Quartet Books. ISBN 978-0704326385.
- L'istante ritrovato. Luigi Primoli fotografo in India, 1905-1906. Catalogo della mostra (Roma, 19 maggio-5 settembre 2004). De Luca Editori d'Arte. 2004. ISBN 978-8880165972.
