= The Two-Ocean War =

Book by Samuel Eliot Morison

- First edition
- Author: Samuel Eliot Morison
- Language: English
- Subject: Military history, World War II
- Publisher: Little, Brown and Company
- Publication date: 1963
- Publication place: United States
- Media type: Print (hardcover)
- Pages: 611
- OCLC: OL17758369M
- Dewey Decimal: 940.544973
- LC Class: D773.M62

The nonfiction book The Two Ocean War: A Short History of the United States Navy in the Second World War by U.S. naval historian Samuel Eliot Morison, is a revised and shortened version of his multi-volume History of United States Naval Operations in World War II. The one-volume book is 611 pages long.

== Publication ==
The first edition was published in 1963 by Little, Brown and Company.

== Reception ==
The book was reviewed several times after being published. A reviewer in the Journal of International Affairs wrote that "the book is an excellent summation" of Morison's earlier History of United States Naval Operations in World War II and one published in the Pacific Historical Review praised the book as a "coherent and tight volume, swift-paced and lively". They noted that there were fewer omissions from the condensing than "one would have expected" but also criticized its coverage of "larger aspects of the war". They concluded that "for the layman it is a superb account of the navy in World War II." The Los Angeles Times deemed the book a "substantial accomplishment" and titled its review: "History of World War II Naval Battles Impresses".
