= Mario Praz =

Italian critic and scholar

Mario Praz KBE
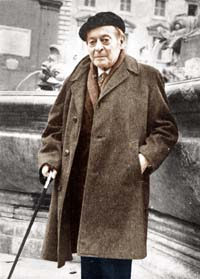
- Born: 6 September 1896; Rome
- Died: 23 March 1982 (aged 85); Rome
- Education: University of Rome; University of Florence
- Occupations: Art and literature critic, scholar
- Spouse: Vivyan Leonora Eyles (m. 1934; div. 1947)
- Children: 1

Mario Praz (Italian: [ˈmaːrjo prats]; 6 September 1896 in Rome – 23 March 1982 in Rome) was an Italian critic of art and literature, and a scholar of English literature. His best-known book, The Romantic Agony (1933), was a survey of the decadent, erotic and morbid themes that characterised European authors of the late 18th and 19th centuries (see Femme fatale for a reference of one of his chapters). The book was written and published first in Italian as La carne, la morte e il diavolo nella letteratura romantica in 1930; and the most recent edition was published in Florence by Sansoni in 1996.

== Biography ==
Praz was the son of Luciano Praz (died 1900), a bank clerk, and his wife, the former Giulia Testa di Marsciano (died 1931), daughter of Count Alcibiade Testa di Marsciano. His stepfather was Carlo Targioni (died 1954), a physician, whom his mother married in 1912.

He studied at the University of Bologna (1914–15), received a law degree from the University of Rome (1918), and received a doctorate in literature from the University of Florence (1920).

Praz married, on 17 March 1934 (separated 1942, divorced 1947), Vivyan Leonora Eyles (1909–1984), an English-literature lecturer at the University of Liverpool whom Praz met during his time there as a special lecturer in Italian studies. She was a daughter of the English novelist and feminist writer Margaret Leonora Eyles (1889–1960), who addressed to her in 1941 an autobiographical work entitled For My Enemy Daughter. She remarried in 1948, as her second husband, art historian Wolfgang Fritz Volbach. Praz and Eyles had one child, a daughter, Lucia Praz (born 1938).

Praz's only other known romantic attachment was to an Anglo-Italian woman named Perla Cacciguerra, whom he met in 1953 and called "Diamante" in the book The House of Life.

Praz's residence in Palazzo Primoli in Rome has been turned into the Museo Mario Praz. In Orhan Pamuk's novel The Museum of Innocence it is mentioned as "the most magnificent writer's museum I had seen".

== Life and writings ==
Praz was a well-respected Italian-born art critic and scholar of the English language. He taught Italian Studies at the Victoria University of Manchester between 1932 and 1934. He then went on to teach English Literature at the University of Rome from 1934, until he retired in 1966. In 1962, he became an honorary Knight Commander of the Order of the British Empire. Though Praz is perhaps best known for his writings in the English literary field, he has made strong contributions to the concepts, writings and perception of both interior design and interior decoration. The concepts that were presented in his The Romantic Agony have been shaped into his design and art criticism. This writing style has been successfully employed in Praz's two most noteworthy design books, The House of Life and An Illustrated History in Interior Design. These works highlight his theories of the interiority of a space, and reveal his concepts of how a person inhabits the interior and how they shape it to make it their own. His ground-breaking work Studies in seventeenth-century imagery, first published in 1939 and reissued many times since, is one of the first attempts to produce a systematic catalogue and analysis of the early modern allegorical genres of the emblem and the personal device.

== Design writings ==
Praz has had a profound impact not only on writings about interior design and decoration but also on the history, and the development, of design. The work, An Illustrated History of Interior Decoration from Pompeii to Art Nouveau has allowed the creation of a photographic album to be made, "Praz's rediscovery of this minor but fascinating art . . . was a revelation, and the historic no less than aesthetic importance of the subject is now recognised by a group of informed collectors". His work "provides a selection of visual representations of domesticity from ancient Greece through to the Art Nouveau, and a commentary upon them." The images show the interior decor and design of Greek, Roman, Medieval, Renaissance and Victorian Homes in Europe between the period of 1770 and 1860. The sketches, paintings, and watercolour representations capture the spatial qualities and features of the interiority and decoration of the overall space. The images record accuracy to the shape of the room, from the carpet to the furniture, pictures, fabrics, wall colour, the hang of curtains and the placement of light. Praz's work has documented all these interior characteristics that would have shaped the space for the residents in the eighteenth and nineteenth centuries. This work has had a strong contribution to the impact of not only researching the interiority of a space, but also providing a new groundwork for recording the history of an interior.

Further, Praz has made an influential impact on the way interior design has been studied and documented since the mid-twentieth century. He helped foster the change in the growth of historical design studies and research. His work, An Illustrated History of Interior Decoration, "merges a traditional art-historical approach with philosophical musings about the role of interior assemblage". Praz was one of the first critics to look into the links between the contexts of art history, and link it to the interior workings of a space. He was one of the first designers to note that furnishings were a representation of the individual. This is shown in this writing as he states "furnishings are tangible artefacts of social history". The concept of the need for furnishing is addressed in the initial stages of this publication. Praz sees the house and its interiority as "a continuum, which is always in need of furnishing". Through the grounding of this concept, "Praz takes the idea of the inhabiting subject, and the interior and its decoration, as pre-given concepts for the construction of this history, not ones that have emerged out of particular historical conditions", thus meaning that the furniture, the home and the interior all act as a "representational evocation" of the individual that resides in the home, reflecting the "character or the personality of the occupant". Ultimately, Praz challenges the concept of interior design and decoration, highlighting how the individual completely influences how the layout and decoration of their house will be presented. The concept that the interior is a personal reflection of the individual is personally manifested in his spatial autobiography The House of Life. The concepts and documentation style that was presented in An Illustrated History of Interior Decoration have been continued and challenged through later design writings by other critics and historians.

The House of Life is the easiest way to understand the concept of the interior representing the individual. Praz's work allows audiences to delve into the personal interior scope of his apartment by providing a "room by room description, of (the) flat in Rome in which he lived for thirty years". The thorough recount of the interiority of this space "shows the apartment (in a manner of a television program), providing autobiographical accounts of associations with furnishings". This autobiographical recount chronicles architecture and orchestrates the interior, giving the reader a full account of his home and "offering us the chance to follow the true routes of privacy, and to recreate the Professor's universe, reduced to the dimensions of the human eye." His writing provides an insight into firstly how he accesses the space in which he lives, and how he inhabits that space. The House of Life basically mimics the writing style of An Illustrated History. This detailed recount and writing style has been mimicked in subsequent design writing, in order to document every aspect of the interiority of a space.

The concept of horror vacuī in art is associated with Praz, who used the term to refer to cluttered visual interior design.

== Influences on the future of design journals and design study ==
The initial findings that are presented in An Illustrated History of Interior Decoration have made influential impacts on the writings in George Savage's A concise history of Interior Design. The concepts of linking the interior to social history are basically echoed in Savage's work. This early influence of Praz's writing in the mid-1960s continued throughout the remainder of the twentieth century. The concepts that were addressed in Praz's work An Illustrated History of Interior Decoration highlight the context of the interior designer, as a profession, in twenty-first-century societies. The work of the interior designer needs to be able to mimic individual needs and wants, so the person can correctly be represented in the interiority of their home. This concept was initially introduced and highlighted by Praz, and this statement allows an insight into how the workings of the interior are conducted.

== Critical views on design writing ==
The varying opinions on Praz's design work can be seen in the writings of Cyril Connolly and Edmund Wilson. While Wilson praises Praz's work as a "masterpiece", Connolly calls The House of Life "one of the most boring books I have ever read. . . . It's unbelievably exhausting. . . . It has a bravura of boredom, an audacity of ennui that makes one hardly believe one's eyes."

== Critical views ==
In his preface of Voce dietro la scena: Un'antologia personale, Mario Praz shows his peculiar irony and understatement in reporting cases of misquotations and misinterpretations of his studies or his personality abroad. He reports the following facts: In the Life and Letters of Sir Edmund Gosse, Gosse writes in a letter dated 17 November 1923: "Mario Praz is an interesting young professor, a great Swinburnian." In the "Italian Pageant", Derek Patmore states: "Dr. Mario Praz, so long a staunch friend of England." Charles Du Bos writes in his diary in 1923: "I dined with Abraham and Mario Praz. He is a great friend of Vernon Lee." Marie-Anne Comnène, the widow of Benjamin Crémieux, writes in Hommes et Mondes, December 1949: "There were authoritative critics: Marco Pron, Franci, Rossi, count Morra and Mademoiselle Bellonci, great animators of the Pen Club." Marco Pron is actually Mario Praz, misspelt. Charles Jackson says in The Outer Edges: "Mario Praz and Bertold Brecht make the best reading in the world for a sexual criminal." Around 1950, Kadar Jennö translated Neoclassic Taste into Hungarian; he asserted that comrade Praz is a harsh enemy of capitalism. Besides these fun facts, though, Praz has been highly admired in Italy and abroad. Edmund Wilson, in "The Genie of the Via Giulia", wrote that Praz "will come to be known to posterity—so far as a foreigner can judge—as one of the best Italian writers of his time".

== Bibliography ==
- Praz, Mario. La carne, la morte e il diavolo nella letteratura romantica, 1930
- Praz, Mario. The Romantic Agony (1933). Translated from the Italian by Angus Davidson ISBN 0-19-281061-8
  - Book review of The Romantic Agony: V. de Sola Pinto, “The Romantic Agony by Mario Praz, Angus Davidson,” Book Review, The Review of English Studies, 11, 41 (Jan., 1935): 109–111,<JSTOR 508692>. The reviewer points out that the last chapter was omitted in the English translation as well as the "numerous and excellent illustrations of the Italian original."
- Praz, Mario. Studies in Seventeenth-Century Imagery (London, 1939). 2 vols
- Praz, Mario. The Hero in Eclipse in Victorian Fiction (Oxford, 1956). Translated from the Italian by Angus Davidson
- Praz, Mario. Mnemosyne: The Parallel Between Literature and the Visual Arts. The A.W.Mellon Lectures in the Fine Arts 1967. (1967)
- Praz, Mario, ed. English Miscellany: A Symposium of literature, history and arts. Reprint of the Complete Collection of Articles in English and Selected Writings by Mario Praz, in 10 vols. (Kyoto: Eureka Press ) ISBN 978-4-902454-19-2
- Praz, M., An Illustrated History of Interior Decoration from Pompeii to Art Nouveau, Thames and Hudson (London) 1964
- Praz, M., The House of Life (translated by Angus Davidson), The Acadine Press, 1964
