= Tom Browning (entomologist) =

Australian entomologist and zoologist

Thomas Oakley Browning (28 January 1920 – April 1998) was an Australian zoologist and peace activist. He was a research scientist in the field of entomology. After his retirement in 1983, he had the title of Emeritus Professor of Entomology at the Waite campus of the University of Adelaide. He also wrote a number of biographies of former colleagues. He died in Adelaide in April 1998 at the age of 78.

== Timeline ==
1920	Born in Maitland, South Australia
1948–1952	Entomologist, Waite Agricultural Research Institute
1952	Nuffield Foundation Fellow
1953–1962	Senior lecturer in zoology, University of Adelaide
1963–1983	Waite Professor of Entomology
1971–1977	Research director, International Centre for Insect Physiology and Ecology, Nairobi
1983-1998	Emeritus professor of entomology
1987–1988	Chairman, Environment Protection Council of South Australia

== Publications ==
- Browning, T. O., 'Davidson, James (1885-1945), Australian Dictionary of Biography, Vol. 8, Melbourne University Press, Melbourne, 1981, pp. 226–227
- Birch, L. C.; Browning, T. O., 'Herbert George Andrewartha 1907-1992', Historical Records of Australian Science, vol. 9, no. 3, 1993, pp. 258–268.

== Research areas ==
- Diapause in crickets
- The quantitative study of insect populations
- Fruit fly
- Population ecology
