= Martin Browning =

British economist

Professor Martin Browning
- Born: 1946 (age 79–80)

Academic background
- Education: Tilburg University, Netherlands
- Website: Information at IDEAS / RePEc

Martin James Browning (born 1946) is Professor of Economics at the University of Oxford, Oxford, England, a Fellow of Nuffield College, Oxford, a Fellow of the Econometric Society, and an emeritus Fellow of the European Economic Association.

== Education ==
Browning received his undergraduate education at the London School of Economics and his doctorate from Tilburg University.

== Career ==
He was previously the Director of the Center for Applied Microeconometrics at the University of Copenhagen, Denmark. Before the appointment at University of Copenhagen, he was a professor at McMaster University, Canada. Before emigrating to Canada, he was a lecturer and then senior lecturer at University of Bristol, UK.

== Research ==
His work is in microeconomic analysis, with emphasis in the empirical assessments of theoretical propositions. He has worked in the areas of intrahousehold decision making; demand analysis; consumption and saving, and its interaction with labor supply. An important part of his work concerns the empirical assessment of rationality through the concept of revealed preference, and the modeling of individual heterogeneity in applied work.

=== Selected journal articles ===
- Browning, Martin; Chiappori, Pierre-André (November 1998). "Efficient intra-household allocations: a general characterization and empirical Tests" (PDF). Econometrica. 66 (6): 1241–1278. doi:10.2307/2999616. JSTOR 2999616.
- Browning, Martin; Crossley, Thomas F. (October 2000). "Luxuries are easier to postpone: a proof". Journal of Political Economy. 108 (5): 1022–1026. doi:10.1086/317668. S2CID 222441057.
- Browning, Martin; Lechene, Valérie (January 2003). "Children and demand: direct and non-direct effects". Review of Economics of the Household. 1 (1): 9–31. doi:10.1023/A:1021895313920. S2CID 55278469.
- Browning, Martin; Blundell, Richard W.; Crawford, Ian A. (January 2003). "Nonparametric engel curves and revealed preference" (PDF). Econometrica. 71 (1): 205–240. doi:10.1111/1468-0262.00394. JSTOR 3082045.
- Browning, Martin; Crossley, Thomas F. (May 2009). "Are two cheap, noisy measures better than one expensive, accurate one?". American Economic Review. 99 (2): 99–103. doi:10.1257/aer.99.2.99. hdl:10419/47507.
- Browning, Martin; Chiappori, Pierre-André; Lechene, Valérie (June 2010). "Distributional effects in household models: separate spheres and income pooling" (PDF). The Economic Journal. 120 (545): 786–799. doi:10.1111/j.1468-0297.2009.02311.x. S2CID 10532216.
- Browning, Martin; Lewbel, Arthur; Chiappori, Pierre-André (2013). "Estimating consumption economies of scale, adult equivalence scales, and household bargaining power". Review of Economic Studies. 80 (4): 1267–1303. doi:10.1093/restud/rdt019.
- Browning, Martin; Carro, Jesus M. (February 2014). "Dynamic binary outcome models with maximal heterogeneity" (PDF). Journal of Econometrics. 178 (2): 805–823. doi:10.1016/j.jeconom.2013.11.005. hdl:10016/20689.
