= Justice Browning =

Justice Browning may refer to:

- Chauncey Browning Sr. (1903–1971), associate justice of the Supreme Court of Appeals of West Virginia
- George L. Browning (1867–1947), associate justice of the Virginia Supreme Court

== See also ==
- Judge Browning (disambiguation)
