= Richard Browning =

Richard Browning may refer to:

- Richard Browning (cricketer) (born 1987), English cricketer
- Richard Browning (inventor) (born 1979), English inventor, entrepreneur and speaker
- Richard Browning (politician) (1952–2025), member of the West Virginia Senate
