= The Brownings =

The Brownings may refer to:

- a famous 19th-century literary couple
  - Robert Browning (1812–1889), English poet and playwright best remembered for The Ring and the Book
  - Elizabeth Barrett Browning (1806–1861), English poet best remembered for Sonnets from the Portuguese

== See also ==
- Browning (disambiguation)
