= John Browning (disambiguation) =

John Browning (1855–1926) was an American weapon designer.

John Browning may also refer to:

- John Browning (died 1416) (c. 1369–1416), MP for Gloucestershire 1397, 1401 and 1414
- John Browning (surveyor) (1831–1909), pioneer surveyor in the South Island of New Zealand
- John Browning (American football) (born 1973), American football player
- John Browning (footballer, born 1888) (1888–1964), Scottish footballer (Celtic)
- John Browning (footballer, born 1915) (1915–1971), Scottish footballer (Liverpool)
- John Browning (pianist) (1933–2003), American pianist
- John Browning (scientific instrument maker) (c. 1831–1925), English scientific instrument maker
- John Edgar Browning (born 1980), American author and editor
- John W. Browning (1842–1904), New York politician

== See also ==
- Jonathan Browning (disambiguation)
