= Jonathan Browning (designer) =

American interior designer and business executive

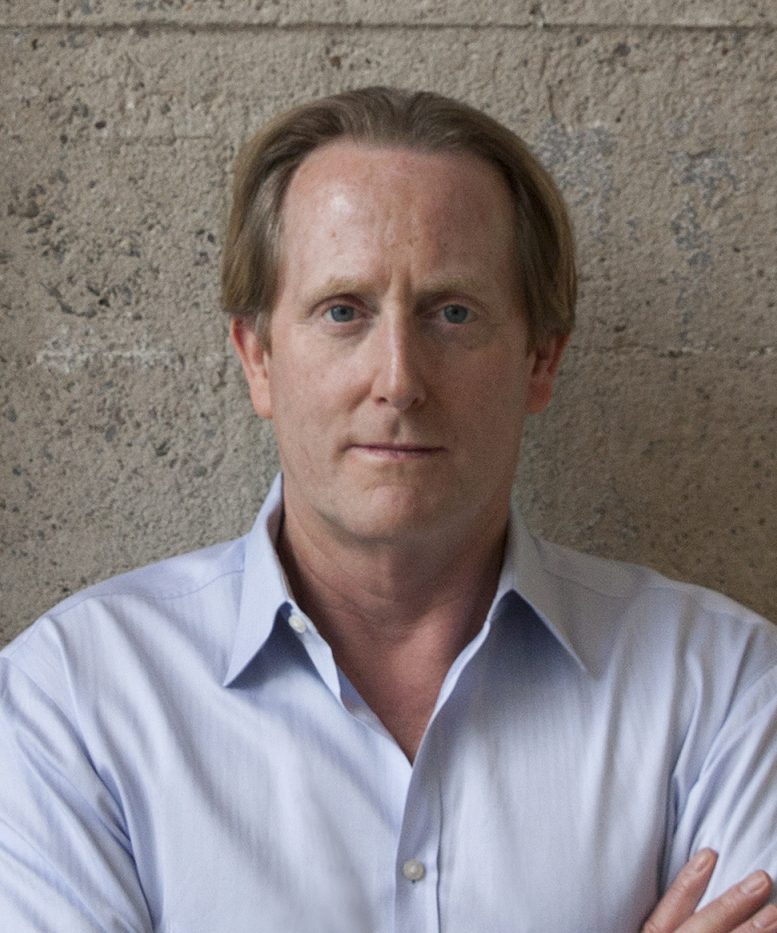
- Education: UC Berkeley (BA); SCI-Arc (M.Arch.)
- Occupations: Designer; Business executive
- Known for: Former executive at Starwood
- Website: Jonathan Browning Studios; Jonathan Browning Design Group

Jonathan Browning is an interior designer and business executive who is a current principal and creative director of Jonathan Browning Studios, Inc. From 2001 to 2003, Browning served as the Executive Vice President of Design at Starwood. He is primarily known as a lighting designer and his work has appeared in buildings in the retail, residential, and hospitality industries.

Browning has been featured in numerous industry publications including Architectural Digest, Luxe Magazine, Elle Decor, the Robb Report, and mainstream publications like Forbes, The New York Times, and The Wall Street Journal,

== Education ==
Browning earned a Bachelor of Arts from the University of California, Berkeley and, later, a Master of Architecture from the Southern California Institute of Architecture.

== Career ==
After graduating from UC Berkeley, Browning went to work as a designer in retail environments. He helped establish the aesthetic for a range of companies, including Esprit, Guess, Gap, and Levi's. He served as the director of visual merchandising for The Gap, the vice president of store design and visual merchandising for Guess, and the lead designer for Levi's store concepts. In 2001, Browning became the Executive Vice President of Design at Starwood Hotels and Resorts Worldwide. As part of his post, Browning was responsible for overseeing the design and image of hotel chains including St. Regis Hotels & Resorts, Sheraton Hotels and Resorts, The Luxury Collection, Westin Hotels & Resorts, and W Hotels (including the Mexico City location).

In 2003, Browning left Starwood to create a lighting design studio called Jonathan Browning Studios, Inc in San Francisco. His firm produces sconces, chandeliers, lamps, pendants, and other furnishings, most of which are cast in bronze using an 18th-century casting process. Browning's work is commonly thought to evoke French Industrial and Beaux-Arts aesthetics. The studio itself is housed in an historic former publishing house from the 1920s in San Francisco's SoMa district. Browning has created bronze fixtures for numerous Tiffany & Co. stores, including the 5th Avenue flagship store. Tiffany’s San Francisco store procured a Garonne chandelier and Garonne sconces. Designers and architects like Robert A.M. Stern, Robert Couterier, and Victoria Hagan have also used Browning products in their designs.

In 2008, Browning entered into a partnership with Viennese light manufacturer, J.T. Kalmar, which was founded in 1881. As part of the agreement, Browning became the company's first Design Director, and he was tasked with looking through the company's archives to adapt and rework certain vintage designs.

In 2015, Browning collaborated with Vaheed Taheri on a collection of rugs. The same year, Browning started the Jonathan Browning Design Group which is dedicated to the art of product design for residential and commercial applications. The group focuses on pure, unique product design available for licensing to manufacturers around the globe. Product categories consist of home decor accessories, hardware, tabletop, rugs and furniture.
