= Samuel Eliot Morison =

American historian, Navy officer (1887–1976)

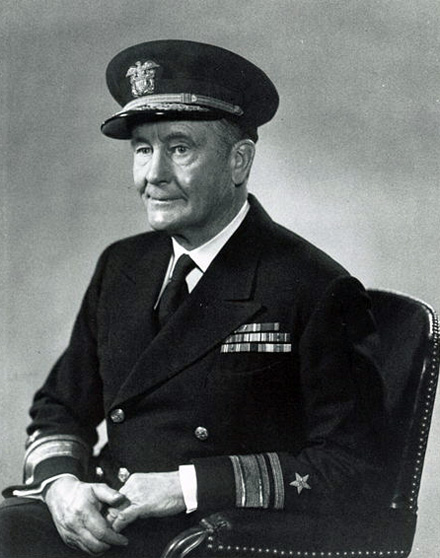
- Morison in 1953
- Born: July 9, 1887; Boston, Massachusetts, U.S.
- Died: May 15, 1976 (aged 88); Boston, Massachusetts, U.S.
- Alma mater: Harvard University; Sciences Po
- Relatives: George B. Morison (uncle)
- Military career
- Allegiance: United States
- Branch: United States Navy
- Service years: 1942–1951
- Rank: Rear admiral (reserve)
- Conflicts: World War II

Samuel Eliot Morison (July 9, 1887 – May 15, 1976) was an American historian noted for his works of maritime history and American history that were both authoritative and popular. He received his Ph.D. from Harvard University in 1912, and taught history at the university for 40 years. He won Pulitzer Prizes for Admiral of the Ocean Sea (1942), a biography of Christopher Columbus, and John Paul Jones: A Sailor's Biography (1959). In 1942, he was commissioned to write a history of United States naval operations in World War II, which was published in 15 volumes between 1947 and 1962. Morison wrote the popular Oxford History of the American People (1965), and co-authored the classic textbook The Growth of the American Republic (1930) with Henry Steele Commager.

Over the course of his career, Morison received eleven honorary doctoral degrees, and garnered numerous literary prizes, military honors, and national awards from both foreign countries and the United States, including two Pulitzer Prizes, two Bancroft Prizes, the Balzan Prize, the Legion of Merit, and the Presidential Medal of Freedom.

== Early life (1887–1912) ==
Samuel Eliot Morison was born July 9, 1887, in Boston, Massachusetts, to John Holmes Morison (1856–1911) and Emily Marshall (Eliot) Morison (1857–1925). He was named for his maternal grandfather Samuel Eliot—a historian, educator, and public-minded citizen of Boston and Hartford, Connecticut. The Eliot family, which produced generations of prominent American intellectuals, descended from Andrew Eliot, who moved to Boston in the 1660s from the English village of East Coker. The most famous of this Andrew Eliot's direct descendants was poet T.S. Eliot, who titled the second of his Four Quartets "East Coker".

Morison attended Noble and Greenough School (1897–1901) and St. Paul's (1901–1903) prior to entering Harvard University, where he was a member of the Phoenix S K Club. At the age of fourteen, he learned to sail, and soon after learned horsemanship—both skills would serve him well in his later historical writings. He earned both a Bachelor of Arts and Master's degree from Harvard in 1908. After studying at the École Libre des Sciences Politiques (1908–1909), Morison returned to Harvard.

== Scholar and historian (1913–1941) ==
Morison originally intended to major in mathematics until Albert Bushnell Hart talked him into researching some papers of an ancestor, which had been stored in his wine cellar. His Harvard dissertation was the basis for his first book The Life and Letters of Harrison Gray Otis, Federalist, 1765–1848 (1913), which sold 700 copies. After earning his Ph.D. at Harvard, Morison became an instructor in history at the University of California, Berkeley, in 1912. In 1915, he returned to Harvard and took a position as an instructor. During World War I, he served as a private in the United States Army. He also served as the American delegate on the Baltic Commission of the Paris Peace Conference until June 17, 1919.

During 1922–1925, Morison taught at Oxford University as the first Harmsworth Professor of American History. In 1925, he returned to Harvard, where he was appointed a full professor. One of several subjects that fascinated Morison was the history of New England. As early as 1921 he published The Maritime History of Massachusetts, 1783–1860. In the 1930s, Morison published a series of books on the history of Harvard University and New England, including Builders of the Bay Colony: A Gallery of Our Intellectual Ancestors (1930), The Founding of Harvard College (1935), Harvard College in the Seventeenth Century (1936), Three Centuries of Harvard: 1636–1936 (1936), and The Puritan Pronaos (1936). In later years, he returned to the subject of New England history, writing The Ropemakers of Plymouth (1950) and The Story of the 'Old Colony' of New Plymouth (1956) and editing the definitive work, Of Plymouth Plantation, 1620–1647 (1952).

Returning to Harvard in 1925, it is noteworthy that Morison was the last professor to arrive there on horseback. He was chosen to speak at the 300th anniversary celebration of Harvard in 1936 and a recording of his speech is included as part of the "Harvard Voices" collection.

Circa 1930, Morison served as the official advisor to the Massachusetts Bay Colony Tercentenary Commission in its efforts to install historical markers to commemorate notable events and locations dating back to 1630. Ultimately, 275 Massachusetts historical markers were installed. In 1938, Morison was elected as an honorary member of the Massachusetts Society of the Cincinnati.

In 1940, Morison published Portuguese Voyages to America in the Fifteenth Century, a book that presaged his succeeding publications on the explorer, Christopher Columbus. In 1941, Morison was named Jonathan Trumbull Professor of American History at Harvard. For Admiral of the Ocean Sea (1942), Morison combined his personal interest in sailing with his scholarship by actually sailing to the various places that Columbus explored. The Harvard Columbus Expedition, led by Morison and including his wife and Captain John W. McElroy, Herbert F. Hossmer Jr., Richard S. Colley, Dr. Clifton W. Anderson, Kenneth R. Spear and Richard Spear, left on 28 August 1939 aboard the 147 foot ketch Capitana for the Azores and Lisbon, Portugal, from which they sailed on the 45-foot (14 m) ketch Mary Otis to retrace Columbus' route using manuscripts and records of his voyages reaching Trinidad by way of Cádiz, Madeira, and the Canary Islands. After following the coast of South and Central America, the expedition returned to Trinidad on 15 December 1939. The expedition returned to New York on 2 February 1940 aboard the United Fruit liner Veragua. The book was awarded the Pulitzer Prize in 1943.

== Naval war service (1942–1952) ==
In 1942, Morison met with his friend President Franklin D. Roosevelt and offered to write a history of United States Navy operations during the war from an insider's perspective by taking part in operations and documenting them. The President and Secretary of the Navy Frank Knox agreed to the proposal. On May 5, 1942, Morison was commissioned a lieutenant commander in the US Naval Reserve, and was called at once to active duty. Gregory Pfitzer explained his procedures:

He gained berths on patrol boats, destroyers, and heavy cruisers; participated in planning sessions for invasions; witnessed sea battles; narrowly escaped death at the hands of a kamikaze pilot; and conducted post-operational interviews with commanders in the Pacific theater.

Morison worked with a team of researchers to prepare the History of United States Naval Operations in World War II, published in 15 volumes between 1947 and 1962, documenting everything from strategy and tactics to technology and the exploits of individuals. British military historian Sir John Keegan called it the best to come out of that conflict. Issued as The Rising Sun in the Pacific in 1948, Volume 3 won the Bancroft Prize in 1949.

Morison was promoted to the rank of captain on December 15, 1945. On August 1, 1951, he was transferred to the Honorary Retired List of the Naval Reserve and was promoted to rear admiral on the basis of combat awards.

In History as a Literary Art: An Appeal to Young Historians (1946), Morison argued that vivid writing springs from the synergy of experience and research:

American historians, in their eagerness to present facts and their laudable concern to tell the truth, have neglected the literary aspects of their craft. They have forgotten that there is an art of writing history.

== Later years (1953–1976) ==
In 1955, Morison retired from Harvard University. He devoted the rest of his life to writing. In quick succession, Morison wrote Christopher Columbus, Mariner (1955), Freedom in Contemporary Society (1956), The Story of the 'Old Colony' of New Plymouth, 1620–1692 (1956), Nathaniel Holmes Morison (1957), William Hickling Prescott (1958), Strategy and Compromise (1958), and John Paul Jones: A Sailor's Biography (1959), which earned Morison his second Pulitzer Prize.

In the early 1960s, Morison's focus returned to his New England youth, writing The Story of Mount Desert Island, Maine (1960), One Boy's Boston, 1887–1901 (1962), Introduction to Whaler Out of New Bedford (1962), and A History of the Constitution of Massachusetts (1963). In 1963, The Two-Ocean War was published, a one-volume abridged history of the United States Navy in World War II.

In 1964, Morison received the Presidential Medal of Freedom from President Lyndon B. Johnson. In presenting the distinguished historian with the highest civilian award in the United States, Johnson noted:

Scholar and sailor, this amphibious historian has combined a life of action and literary craftsmanship to lead two generations of Americans on countless voyages of discovery.

Morison's later years were devoted to books on exploration, such as The Caribbean as Columbus Saw It, written jointly with Mauricio Obregón (1964), Spring Tides (1965), The European Discovery of America (1971–1974), and Samuel de Champlain: Father of New France (1972). His research for the latter book included sailing many of the routes taken by Champlain, and tracing others by airplane.

Morison's first marriage to Elizabeth S. Greene produced four children—one of whom, Emily Morison Beck, became editor of Bartlett's Familiar Quotations. Elizabeth died on August 20, 1945. In 1949, Morison married Baltimore widow Priscilla Barton. Priscilla died on February 22, 1973.

== Death and legacy ==
Morison died of a stroke on May 15, 1976. His ashes are buried at Forest Hill Cemetery in Northeast Harbor, Maine.

During his life Morison had received two Pulitzer Prizes, two Bancroft Prizes, the American Academy of Arts and Sciences' Emerson-Thoreau Medal (1961), and numerous honorary degrees, military awards, and honors from foreign nations.

On July 19, 1979, the frigate USS Samuel Eliot Morison was launched, honoring Morison and his contributions to the United States Navy. Morison's legacy is also sustained by the United States Naval History and Heritage Command's Samuel Eliot Morison Naval History Scholarship. Boston's Commonwealth Avenue Mall features a bronze statue depicting Morison in sailor's oilskin.

Morison's last known public appearance was on April 8, 1976, when he served as the ribbon cutter to open the USS Constitution Museum. "The Museum's research library and an annual award given by the Museum for scholarship in history are both named in his honor." The museum gives the annual Samuel Eliot Morison Award to a person whose public service has enhanced the image of the USS Constitution, and who reflects the best of Samuel Eliot Morison: artful scholarship, patriotic pride, and eclectic interest in the sea and things maritime.

In 1976, the American Heritage magazine initiated an award named in honor of Morison called the Samuel Eliot Morison Award, honoring an American author whose work shows "that good history is literature as well as high scholarship." It lasted two years.

Since 1982, the Naval Order of the United States gives an honor in Morison's name, the Samuel Eliot Morison Award for Naval Literature, for significant works about the US Navy.

In 1985, the Society for Military History established the Samuel Eliot Morison Prize, recognizing an author's body of contributions in the field of military history.

== Criticism ==
=== Slavery ===
Morison was criticized by some African-American scholars for his treatment of American slavery in early editions of his book The Growth of the American Republic, which he co-wrote with Henry Steele Commager and later with Commager's student William E. Leuchtenburg. The book originated as Morison's two-volume Oxford History of the United States (Oxford University Press, 1927). First published in 1930, the first two editions of the textbook, according to these critics, echoed the thesis of American Negro Slavery (1918) by Ulrich Bonnell Phillips. This view, sometimes called the Phillips school of slavery historiography, was considered an authoritative interpretation of the history of American slavery during the first half of the twentieth century, despite the intense criticism by some African-American scholars for its alleged racist underpinnings. Phillips's theories remained authoritative, considered by many white scholars to be ground-breaking and progressive when first proposed. In 1944, the NAACP began its criticism of The Growth of the American Republic.

In 1950, despite denying any racist intent (he noted his daughter's marriage to the son of Joel Elias Spingarn, the second president of the NAACP), Morison reluctantly agreed to most of the demanded changes. Morison refused to eliminate references to slaves who were loyal and devoted to their masters because they were treated well and to some positive "civilizing" effects of the American system of slavery. Morison also refused to remove references to stereotypes of African Americans that he believed were vital in accurately depicting the racist nature of American culture in the 19th and the early 20th centuries, an era during which even the most enlightened progressive thinkers routinely explained many aspects of human behavior as a result of innate racial or ethnic characteristics. In the 1962 edition of the textbook, Morison removed additional content that his critics had found to be offensive.

=== Battle of Savo Island ===
In his semi-official account of the Battle of Savo Island, a disastrous defeat for the US Navy during World War II, Morison partly blamed the defeat on the failure of an Australian aircrew to inform the Americans of the approaching Japanese forces. Morison appears to have based that story on inaccurate information that has since been refuted. On October 21, 2014, the US Navy issued a letter of apology to the last surviving member of the RAAF Hudson crew, which had sighted and duly reported the approach of the Japanese Naval Task Force. The letter states that "RAdm. Morison's criticism was unwarranted."

== Honors and awards ==
Award ribbons

1st Row	Legion of Merit with "V" device	Navy Unit Commendation	Presidential Medal of Freedom (1964)
2nd Row	World War I Victory Medal	American Campaign Medal	European-African-Middle Eastern; Campaign Medal with battle star
3rd Row	Asiatic-Pacific Campaign Medal with six battle stars	World War II Victory Medal	Officer, Order of Merit of the Italian Republic (1961)
4th Row	Commander, Order of the White Rose of Finland	Commander, Order of Isabella the Catholic (1963)	Philippine Liberation Medal

Other honors

- Member of the American Academy of Arts and Sciences (1915)
- Member of the American Philosophical Society (1937)
- Honorary Member of the Massachusetts Society of the Cincinnati (1938)
- Vuelo Panamericano Medal (Republic of Cuba) (1943)

Honorary degrees

- Trinity College, Hartford (1935)
- Amherst College (1936)
- Harvard University (1936)
- Union College (1939)
- Columbia University (1942)
- Yale University (1949)
- Williams College (1950)
- University of Oxford (1951)
- Bucknell University (1960)
- Boston College (1961)
- College of the Holy Cross (1962)

Literary prizes

- Loubat Prize (1938) for The Founding of Harvard College (1935) and Harvard College in the Seventeenth Century (1936)
- Pulitzer Prize (1943) for Admiral of the Ocean Sea (1942)
- Bancroft Prize (1949) for The Rising Sun in the Pacific (1948)
- Pulitzer Prize (1960) for John Paul Jones: A Sailor's Biography (1959)
- American Academy of Arts and Sciences Emerson-Thoreau Medal (1961)
- American Academy of Arts and Letters Gold Medal (1962)
- Balzan Prize (1962) for History of United States Naval Operations in World War II (1963)
- Bancroft Prize (1972) for The European Discovery of America: The Northern Voyages (1971)

Memorial
A statue of Morison sits on the Commonwealth Avenue Mall in Boston. On the base is engraved his advice to young writers: "Dream dreams and write them, aye, but live them first".

== Works ==
Books by Morison (alphabetical):

- Admiral of the Ocean Sea. 2 vols. Boston: Little, Brown and Company, 1942.
- American Contributions to the Strategy of World War II. London: Oxford University Press, 1958.
- The Ancient Classics in a Modern Democracy. New York: Oxford University Press, 1939.
- Builders of the Bay Colony. Boston: Houghton Mifflin, 1930.
- By Land and By Sea. New York: Knopf, 1953.
- The Caribbean as Columbus Saw It. Boston: Little, Brown and Company, 1964. (with Mauricio Obregon)
- Christopher Columbus, Mariner. Boston: Little, Brown and Company, 1955.
- The Class Lives of Samuel Eliot and Nathaniel Homes Morison, Harvard 1839. Boston: Privately printed, 1926.
- The Conservative American Revolution. Washington, DC: Society of the Cincinnati, 1976.
- Doctor Morison's Farewell to the Colonial Society of Massachusetts. Boston: Merrymount Press, 1939.
- The European Discovery of America. 2 vols. New York: Oxford University Press, 1971–1974.
- The Events of the Year MDCCCCXXXV. Boston: Merrymount Press, 1936.
- The Founding of Harvard College. Cambridge: Harvard University Press, 1935.
- Francis Parkman. Boston: Massachusetts Historical Society, 1973.
- Freedom in Contemporary Society. Boston: Little, Brown and Company, 1956.
- The Growth of the American Republic 2 vols. Oxford: Oxford University Press, 1930.
- Harrison Gray Otis, 1765–1848: The Urbane Federalist. Boston: Houghton Mifflin, 1969.
- Harvard College in the Seventeenth Century. 2 vols. Cambridge: Harvard University Press, 1936.
- Harvard Guide to American History. Cambridge: Harvard University Press, 1963. (with Arthur Meier Schlesinger, Frederick Merk, Arthur Meier Schlesinger Jr., and Paul Herman Buck)
- Historical Background for the Massachusetts Bay Tercentenary in 1930. Boston: Massachusetts Bay Tercentenary, Inc., 1928, 1930.
- Historical Markers Erected by Massachusetts Bay Colony Tercentenary Commission. Texts of Inscriptions As Revised By Samuel Eliot Morison. Boston: Commonwealth of Massachusetts, 1930.
- History As A Literary Art. Boston: Old South Association, 1946.
- A History of the Constitution of Massachusetts. Boston: Special Commission on Revision of the Constitution, 1963.
- A History of the Constitution of Massachusetts. Boston: Wright & Potter, 1917.
- History of United States Naval Operations in World War II. 15 vols. Boston: Little, Brown and Company, 1947–1962.
- An Hour of American History: From Columbus to Coolidge. Philadelphia: J. B. Lippincott & Co., 1929.
- Introduction to Whaler Out of New Bedford. New Bedford: Old Dartmouth Historical Society, 1962.
- John Paul Jones: A Sailor's Biography. Boston: Little, Brown and Company, 1959.
- The Journals and other Documents Relating to the Life and Voyages of Christopher Columbus. Edited and Translated by Samuel Eliot Morison with illustrations by Lima de Freitas. New York: First Editions Club; Heritage Press, 1963. Norwalk, CT: Easton Press, 1990.
- Life and Letters of Harrison Gray Otis. 2 vols. Boston: Houghton Mifflin, 1913.
- Life in Washington a Century and a Half Ago. Washington, DC: Cosmos Club, 1968.
- The Maritime History of Massachusetts, 1783–1860. Boston: Houghton Mifflin, 1921.
- Nathaniel Homes Morison. Baltimore: Peabody Institute, 1957.
- A New and Fresh English Translation of the Letter of Columbus Announcing the Discovery of America. Madrid: Graficas Yagues, 1959.
- Of Plymouth Plantation, 1620–1647. Editor. New York: Knopf, 1952.
- Old Bruin: Commodore Matthew Calbraith Perry, 1796–1858. Boston: Little, Brown and Company, 1967.
- One Boy's Boston, 1887–1901. Boston: Houghton Mifflin, 1962.
- The Oxford History of the American People. New York: Oxford University Press, 1965.
- Oxford History of the United States. 2 vols. Oxford: Oxford University Press, 1927.
- The Pilgrim Fathers: Their Significance in History. Boston: Merrymount Press, 1937.
- Portuguese Voyages to America in the Fifteenth Century. Cambridge: Harvard University Press, 1940.
- A Prologue to American History: An Inaugural Lecture. Oxford: Clarendon Press, 1922.
- The Proprietors of Peterborough, New Hampshire. Peterborough: Historical Society, 1930.
- The Puritan Pronaos. New York: New York University Press, 1936.
- Ropemakers of Plymouth. Boston: Houghton Mifflin, 1950.
- Sailor Historian: The Best of Samuel Eliot Morison. Edited by Emily Morison Beck. Boston: Houghton Mifflin, 1977.
- Samuel de Champlain: Father of New France. Boston: Little, Brown and Company, 1972.
- The Scholar in American: Past, Present, and Future. New York: Oxford University Press, 1961.
- The Second Voyage of Christopher Columbus. New York: Oxford University Press, 1939.
- Sources and Documents Illustrating the American Revolution, 1764–1788, and the Formation of the Federal Constitution. Oxford: Clarendon Press, 1923.
- Spring Tides. Boston: Houghton Mifflin, 1965.
- The Story of Mount Desert Island, Maine. Boston: Little, Brown and Company, 1960.
- The Story of the 'Old Colony' of New Plymouth, 1620–1692. New York: Knopf, 1956.
- Strategy and Compromise. Boston: Little, Brown and Company, 1958.
- These Forty Years. Boston: Privately printed, 1948. (Address to the 40th Reunion, Harvard Class of 1908)
- Three Centuries of Harvard, 1636–1936. Cambridge: Harvard University Press, 1936.
- The Two-Ocean War. Boston: Little, Brown and Company, 1963.
- Vistas of History. New York: Knopf, 1964.
- William Hickling Prescott. Boston: Massachusetts Historical Society, 1958.
- The Young Man Washington. Cambridge: Harvard University Press, 1932.
