= Ethel Browning (toxicologist) =

Dietitian, factory inspector and toxicologist

Ethel Browning née Chadwick (1891–1969) was a medical researcher who specialised in dietetics and toxicology. She wrote many papers and 12 books, including Toxicity of Industrial Organic Solvents which became the standard reference on the subject. She was appointed as an official inspector of factories from 1940 to 1958 and continued as a consultant into her seventies.

She was born in Bury on 16 March 1891, went to school in Hough Green and then studied medicine at the University of Liverpool where she was a Roger Lyon Jones scholar, won the Holt and Kanthack medals and the university prize for medicine.
