= History of United States Naval Operations in World War II =

15-volume series of non-fiction books by Samuel Eliot Morison

- Original cover of the first book in the series, The Battle of the Atlantic
- Author: Samuel Eliot Morison
- Country: United States
- Language: English
- Genre: Non-fiction
- Publisher: Little, Brown and Company
- Published: 1947–1962
- Media type: Print

The History of United States Naval Operations in World War II is a 15-volume account of the United States Navy in World War II, written by Samuel Eliot Morison and published by Little, Brown and Company between 1947 and 1962.

== Background ==
Immediately after the attack on Pearl Harbor, Morison, already convinced of the value of personal involvement as a result of sailing experience while writing his biography of Christopher Columbus, wrote to President Roosevelt suggesting the preparation of an official history of the Navy in the war, and volunteering for the task. Both President Roosevelt and the Secretary of the Navy Frank Knox agreed, and in May 1942 Morison was commissioned as a lieutenant commander in the United States Naval Reserve, and assigned a staff of assistants, with permission to go anywhere and to see all official records. Morison's reputation as a knowledgeable sailor (based on his analysis in the biography of Christopher Columbus) preceded him, and he was welcomed on a number of ships, eleven of them in all by the end of the war.

The result was a normal historical work, not a prescribed official history. James Forrestal, Secretary of the Navy 1944–47, wrote: "The Navy Department has done everything possible to enable him [Morison] to make his research exhaustive and to afford him firsthand impressions. This work, however, is in no sense an official history. The form, style, and character of the narrative are the author's own. The opinions expressed and the conclusions reached are those of Dr. Morison, and of him alone. He has been subject to no restrictions other than those imposed by the necessity of safeguarding information which might endanger national security."

The limitations of the History of U.S. Naval Operations primarily stem from its publication shortly after the end of the war, as Morison himself acknowledged. He recognized that any history written in such proximity to the events it describes cannot claim complete objectivity or definitive accuracy. New facts may emerge later, and discarded information may become relevant in new interpretations. Despite these challenges, Morison argued that writing close to the events, while participants are still alive, offers greater insights than waiting until later, when the physical artifacts are gone and firsthand accounts are lost. In his words: "Historians in years to come may shoot this book full of holes; but they can never recapture the feeling of desperate urgency in our planning and preparations, of the excitement of battle, of exultation over a difficult operation successfully concluded, of sorrow for shipmates who did not live to enjoy the victory."

Some material, especially related to codebreaking, was then still classified, and later in-depth research into particular occurrences in the war did clarify points that had been passed over rather lightly. Some rewriting was incorporated in the later printings of this series. This History of U.S. Naval Operations also intentionally avoided a certain amount of analysis, for instance deferring to other works for the causes of the Japanese attack on Pearl Harbor. The intended audience for the work, to quote from the preface, was "the general reader rather than the professional sailor."

== Contents ==
The volumes:

1. Morison, Samuel Eliot (1946). The Battle of the Atlantic, September 1939 – May 1943.
2. Morison, Samuel Eliot (1947). Operations in North African Waters, October 1942 – June 1943. OL 2917797W.
3. Morison, Samuel Eliot (1948). The Rising Sun in the Pacific, 1931 – April 1942.
4. Morison, Samuel Eliot (1949). Coral Sea, Midway, and Submarine Actions, May 1942 – August 1942. Little brown and company.
5. Morison, Samuel Eliot (1949). The Struggle for Guadalcanal, August 1942 – February 1943. ISBN 978-0-252-06996-3.
6. Morison, Samuel Eliot (1950). Breaking the Bismarcks Barrier, July 22, 1942 – May 1, 1944. ISBN 978-0-252-06997-0.
7. Morison, Samuel Eliot (1951). Aleutians, Gilberts, and Marshalls, June 1942 – April 1944.
8. Morison, Samuel Eliot (1953). New Guinea and the Marianas, March 1944 – August 1944. ISBN 978-0-252-07038-9.
9. Morison, Samuel Eliot (1954). Sicily – Salerno – Anzio, January 1943 – June 1944. OL 6510710M.
10. Morison, Samuel Eliot (1954). The Atlantic Battle Won, May 1943 – May 1945. ISBN 978-0-252-07061-7.
11. Morison, Samuel Eliot (1955). The Invasion of France and Germany, 1944–1945.
12. Morison, Samuel Eliot (1958). Leyte, June 1944 – January 1945. The Atlantic Monthly Press; Distributed by Little, Brown. OL 24388559M.
13. Morison, Samuel Eliot (1959). The Liberation of the Philippines: Luzon, Mindanao, the Visayas, 1944–1945. OL 6510710M.
14. Morison, Samuel Eliot (1960). Victory in the Pacific, 1945. OL 24590968M.
15. Morison, Samuel Eliot (1962). Supplement and General Index. OL 24366206M.

An abridgement of the fifteen-volume work was written by Morison and published in 1963:

- Morison, Samuel Eliot (1963). The Two-Ocean War: A Short History of the United States Navy in the Second World War. Boston: Little, Brown. ISBN 9781591145240.

== Documentary ==
This History of U.S. Naval Operations also played an indirect role in the history of television. One of Morison's research assistants in the project, Henry Salomon, knew the National Broadcasting Corporation's Robert Sarnoff and, in 1949, first proposed an ambitious documentary television series on U.S. Navy and Marine Corps warfare in World War II. In 1951 the National Broadcasting Company hired Salomon to produce what would become the 1952–1953 television series, Victory at Sea. The success of this television series played a major role in establishing the historical documentary, using combat footage, as a viable television genre.
