= Alexander Sakharoff =

Russian ballet dancer (1886–1963)

- Александр Сахаров
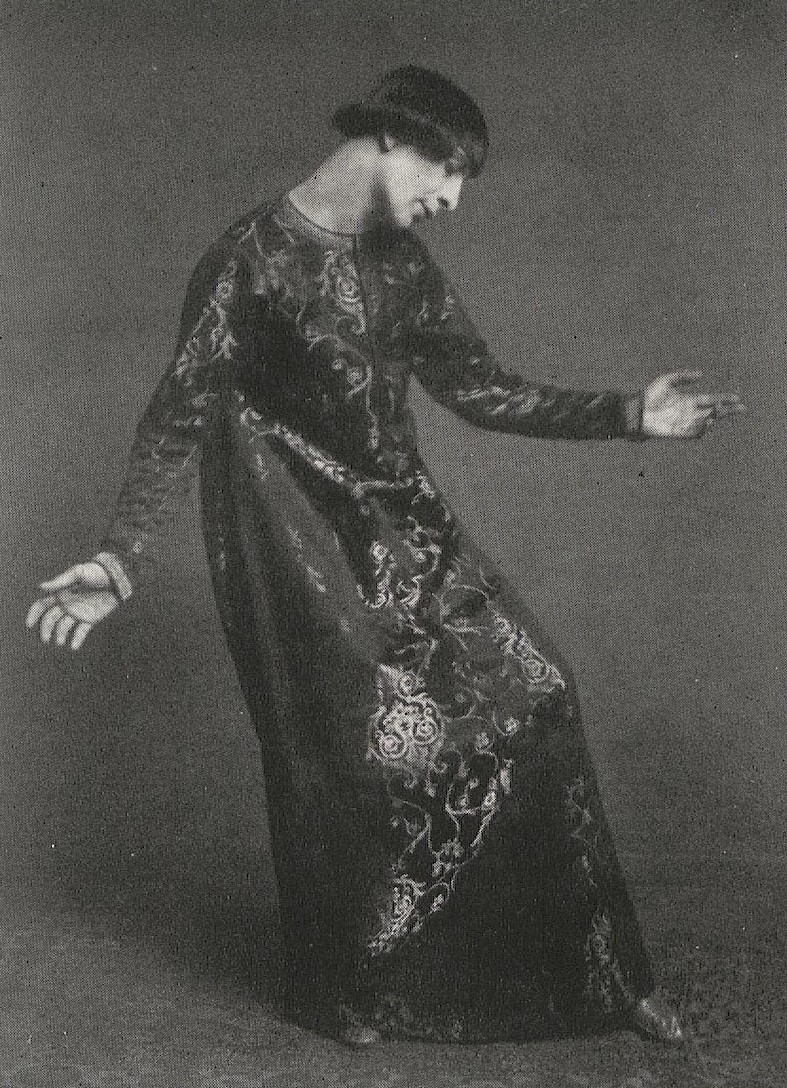
- Tanzstudie, 1912
- Born: Alexander Zuckermann; 13 May 1886; Mariupol, Russian Empire
- Died: 25 September 1963 (aged 77); Siena, Italy
- Other names: Alexander Sakharov, Alexander Sacharoff
- Education: Académie Julian
- Occupations: Dancer; teacher; choreographer
- Spouse: Clotilde von der Planitz

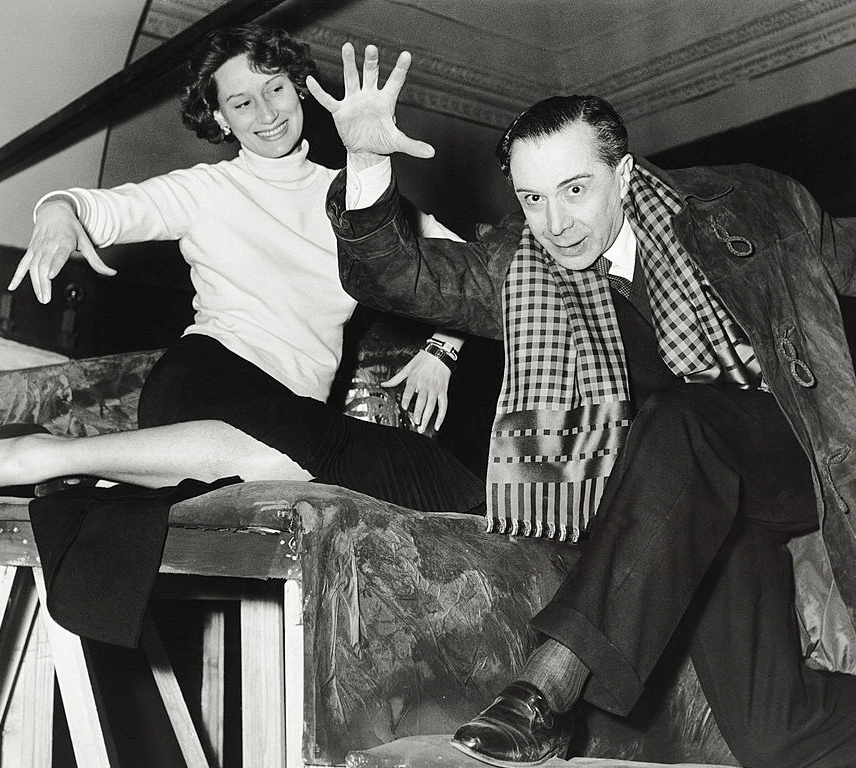
Elena Zareschi and Alexander Sakharoff rehearsing Hamlet in the 1950s

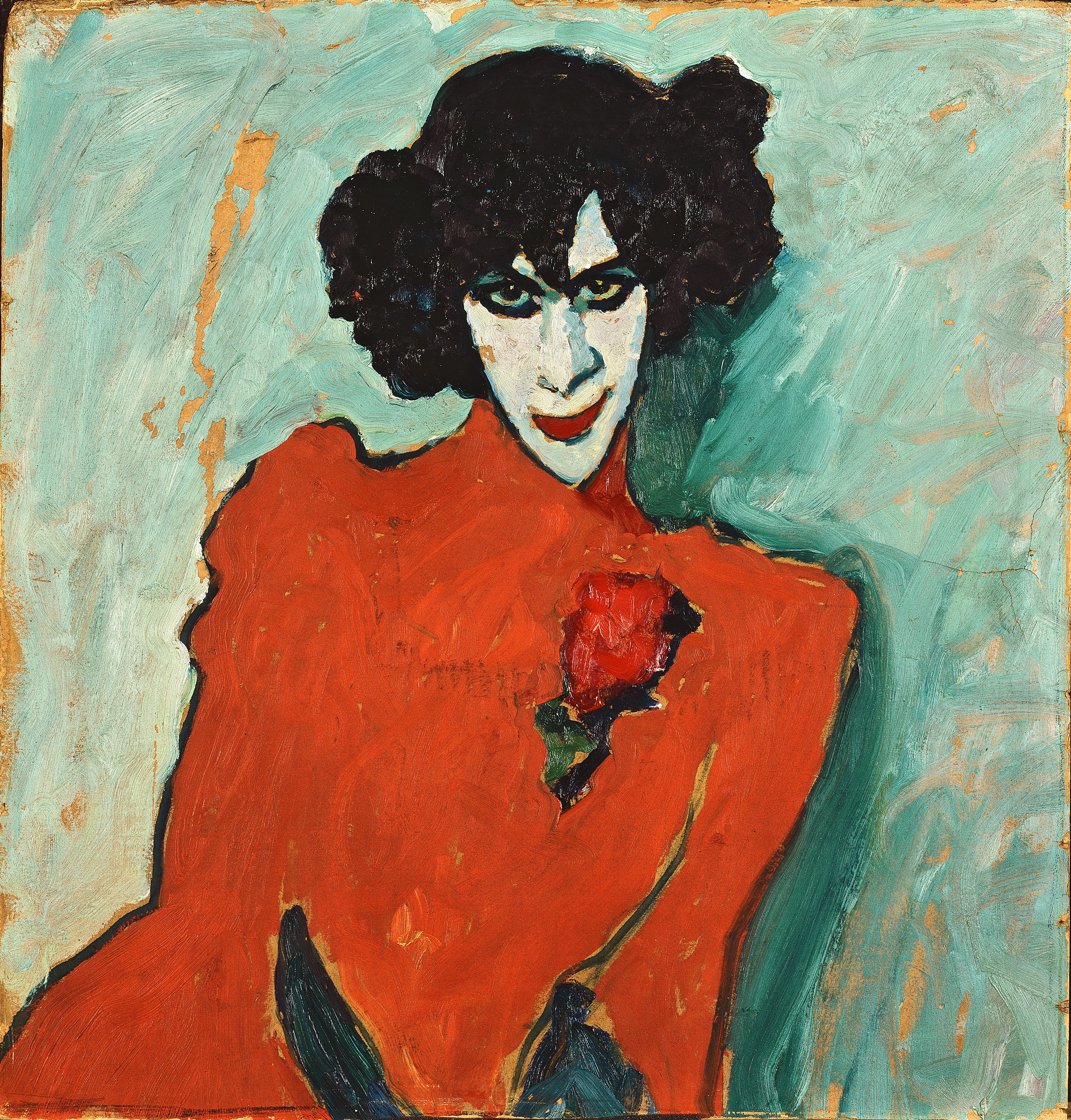
Alexander Sakharoff by Alexej von Jawlensky, 1909

Alexander Sakharoff (also spelled Sakharov and Sacharoff; Russian: Александр Сахаров; 13 May 1886 – 25 September 1963) was a Russian dancer, teacher, and choreographer who immigrated to France.

== Life ==
Sakharoff was born Alexander Zuckermann on 13 May 1886 in Mariupol, Russian Empire, to a Jewish family.

Alexander was one of the most innovative soloist dancers of the first decades of the 20th century. He trained as a painter at the Academie de Beaux Arts and the Académie Julian in Paris. His androgynous appearance led to him being painted by painters including Jawlensky and Marianne von Werefkin in 1909.

He married the German dancer Clotilde von der Planitz (1893–1974), and they had a successful career together. Their 1921 portrait by George Barbier to advertise their work was seen as showing a "mutually complementary androgynous couple" "united in dance" joined together in an act of "artistic creation."

Their outrageous costumes included wigs made from silver and gold coloured metal, with hats and outfits decorated with flowers and wax fruit. They married in 1919, and with the financial support of Edith Rockefeller, appeared at the Metropolitan Opera in New York but without any great success.

They were living in Paris between the wars, and in 1933, Émile Vuillermoz recognised their fame when he published his work Clotilde et Alexandre Sakharoff. The work included photographs and colour illustrations of their choreography.

Using the name "The Sakharoffs" they toured widely visiting China and Japan which was so successful that they returned again in 1934. They and their extravagant costumes visited both North and South America. They found themselves in Spain when France was invaded by Germany. They returned to South America making a new base in Buenos Aires until 1949. They toured Italy the following year and they took up an invitation to teach in Rome by Guido Chigi-Saracini. They taught at the Accademia Musicale Chigiana in Siena for Saracini and they also opened their own dance school in Rome.

In his book Reflections on Dance and Music, he explained his artistic credo:

...Clotilde Sakharoff and I did not dance with music or accompanied by music: we danced music. We made the music visual, expressing by means of movements what the composer has expressed by means of sounds... Nothing less than the states of the soul, the impressions, the sensations lived by the composer and transposed to the sound with the help of its art... Our aim was to transpose the sense expressed by the music of the sounds, to the music of the movements.

He died in Siena, Italy 25 September 1963. He is buried in Cimitero Acattolico in Rome.

== Legacy ==
His wife gave and sold many of their remaining writings and costumes to museums and auctions. She eventually sold the 1909 painting of Sakharoff by Alexej von Jawlensky. Dansmuseet in Stockholm has 23 Sakharoff costumes in their collection since 1973. In 1997 the German Dance Archive Cologne purchased many remaining items relating to the couple. They have 65 costumes, 300 set and costume designs and 500 photographs.
