= Pancole =

Pancole may refer to:

- Pancole, San Gimignano, a village in the province of Siena, Italy
- Pancole, Scansano, a village in the province of Grosseto, Italy
