= Vuillermoz =

Vuillermoz (French pronunciation: [vɥijɛʁmo]) is a surname of Arpitan origin. Like many Arpitan anthroponyms, the final -z only marks paroxytonic stress and should not be pronounced. Nevertheless, it is often pronounced in French through hypercorrection.

Notable people with the surname include:.

== People ==
- Alexis Vuillermoz (born 1988), French cyclist
- Émile Vuillermoz (1878–1960), French critic
- Michel Vuillermoz (born 1962), French actor and screenwriter
- René-Laurent Vuillermoz (born 1977), Italian biathlete
