= Massimo Carpegna =

Italian conductor

Massimo Carpegna (born 8 March 1955) is an Italian conductor.

== Biography ==
After concluding the Scientific Lyceum studies with the highest score, he graduated in Choral Music and Conducting at Antonio Vivaldi Conservatoire (Alessandria, Italy), and he specialized in Orchestra Conducting (Accademia Musicale Chigiana, Siena; Verona Arena; Accademia Ottorino Respighi, Rome) with Maestro Franco Ferrara, who was teacher of Riccardo Muti, Riccardo Chailly and some of the most prestigious Italian and European orchestra conductors. For the Alpine Ski World Championship opening ceremony, Bormio 2005, he composed the lyrical-symphonic official anthem "It's Time to Celebrate", transmitted worldwide; for the Italian Winter Sports Federation (FISI) he composed the official anthem "Honour and Glory", presented at Herbert Von Karajan Theatre in St. Moritz. Carpegna also composed the anthem "The Five Rings" for the celebration of the Italian athletes during the Olympic Games in Turin, 2006, transmitted by RaiSat Sport, as well as scores for commemorative celebrations (e.g. Modena Volley, Regiment of Sardinia's Grenadier...) and soundtracks for celebratory documentaries (St. Geminiano – The Community and The Saint of Modena, city of the Estensi).

He taught Chamber Music and Orchestral Practice at Dall'Abaco music Conservatoire (Verona), and since 1984 he's been teaching Choral Practice, Orchestral Practice, Orchestra Conducting, Choral Composition and Conducting laboratory, Music and Moving Image (Masterclass) at Orazio Vecchi-Antonio Tonelli music Conservatoire in Modena. In 2021 he started a collaboration with the London Performing Academy of Music http://www.lpmam.com/faculty-classical/#composition as Visiting Professor. In 2012 he started conducting the Gospel Choir Serial Singers, Modena, one of the most popular choirs in the national territory with many concerts and the support of the Giuseppe Verdi Symphony Orchestra, Parma. He worked as Choir Conductor in some operas: La bohème (Giacomo Puccini) with Luciano Pavarotti, Tosca (Giacomo Puccini) with Raina Kabaivanska, Boris Godunov (Modest Mussorgsky), Otello (Giuseppe Verdi) with Nicola Martinucci, The Canterville Ghost by Claudio Scannavini and he was concertmaster and conductor for The Little Sweep by Benjamin Britten.

In January 2015 he was in the concert in honor of Karl Jenkins at Carnegie Hall in New York City as conductor of the choir, and Distinguished Concerts International New York invited Carpegna on April 3, 2016 at the Lincoln Center for the Performing Arts (Avery Fisher Hall) for the world premiere of his cantata Speculum Magiae for baritone, choir and orchestra conducted by Jonathan Griffith.

Active as a conference speaker, especially on Giacomo Puccini’s theatre (Manon Lescaut, Bohème, Tosca, Butterfly, Turandot, Aida (Giuseppe Verdi), Carmen (Georges Bizet) with the cooperation of the Raina Kabaivanska’s opera students masterclass, published on DVDs) he also organised the tutorial with Mirella Freni, The Puccinian Heroines (1994), and for the twenty-fifth anniversary of Luciano Pavarotti in theatres he collaborated in the documentary Luciano Pavarotti and the Italian Tenor (1989), produced by the New York Center of Visual History and South Carolina Educational Television. In 1986 Carpegna conducted the Choir of the Conservatoire Vecchi Tonelli in a Christmas concert with Luciano Pavarotti at the Cathedral of Modena.

Carpegna has worked as lecturer of Industrial Filming and Cinematography, Music Video Production Lab and Audio Video Editing at the University of Modena and Reggio Emilia, faculty of Business and Marketing. He also followed the Master in Film Sonorization as programme leader. He worked as Artistic Consultant for the Coro Lirico Teatro Regio of Parma, Consultant for the National Research Council (Italy) for the constitution of an informative archive on the lyrical European production, Musical Director of the American society Sounds of Hope Ltd, Saint Paul, Minnesota, Principal Conductor of the Chamber Orchestra for the Civic Theatre in Vercelli, and as Vice-director and responsible for the laboratory of psycho-musical research at IRPAIAC (European Institute of Research, Rehabilitation and Psycho-musical Reeducation of the Aosta Association International Art Center). In 2023 he won the third edition of the Swiss International Composition — Lugano, the Bach International Music Competition in London and the United Kingdom International Music Competition in London for the Composition section with a maximum duration of 20 minutes with the symphonic poem “Beyond the Man”. With the symphonic sketch “Hymn to the fallen for Freedom” he won the World Classical Music Awards and the Elizabeth International Music Competition (Platinum Prize) in London.

== Other activities ==
Massimo Carpegna has collaborated for ten years with Mediagroup (Modena, Italy), working as editor and composer for more than two hundred productions for Confindustria, Legacoop, AssoCamereEstero UNIMORE, Conad, Casa Modena, Fini etc. He then founded the production company Moviegroup, Industrial Film Production Srl and directed adverts for Mediaset, promoting documentaries for publishing houses, industries and multinational companies and television productions that are broadcast nationally. Professional Apple trainer for audio and video editing at SPEL, a Macintosh Concessionaire in Modena.

== Books ==
Carpegna wrote the manual To Make a Choir (Dino Audino ed., Rome, 2006) and Commercial, a 30 Seconds Long Film (Franco Angeli ed., Milan, 2008) both currently in use as university texts. In 2010 he published his first narrative book, the conspiracy thriller Allah's fire (Spring, Caserta), in 2012 the crime story There, she will fall in flight (Firenze Libri, Florence) and in 2015 the spy story Fire and Storm (E-book, Modena), in 2017 Praesagium (GDS Milan Publisher) and in 2018 Il fuoco e la tempesta Parte Prima and Il fuoco e la tempesta Parte Seconda (GDS Milan Publisher). Procedura Butterfly – Il metodo Stanislavskij e il teatro dell’opera (GDS, Milan, 2018); in 2020 Opere e grandi musicisti in pillole (GDS ed., Milan, 2020) and in 2021 Pillole di musica (GDS ed., Milan, 2021),
