= Franco Ferrara =

Italian conductor (1911–1985)

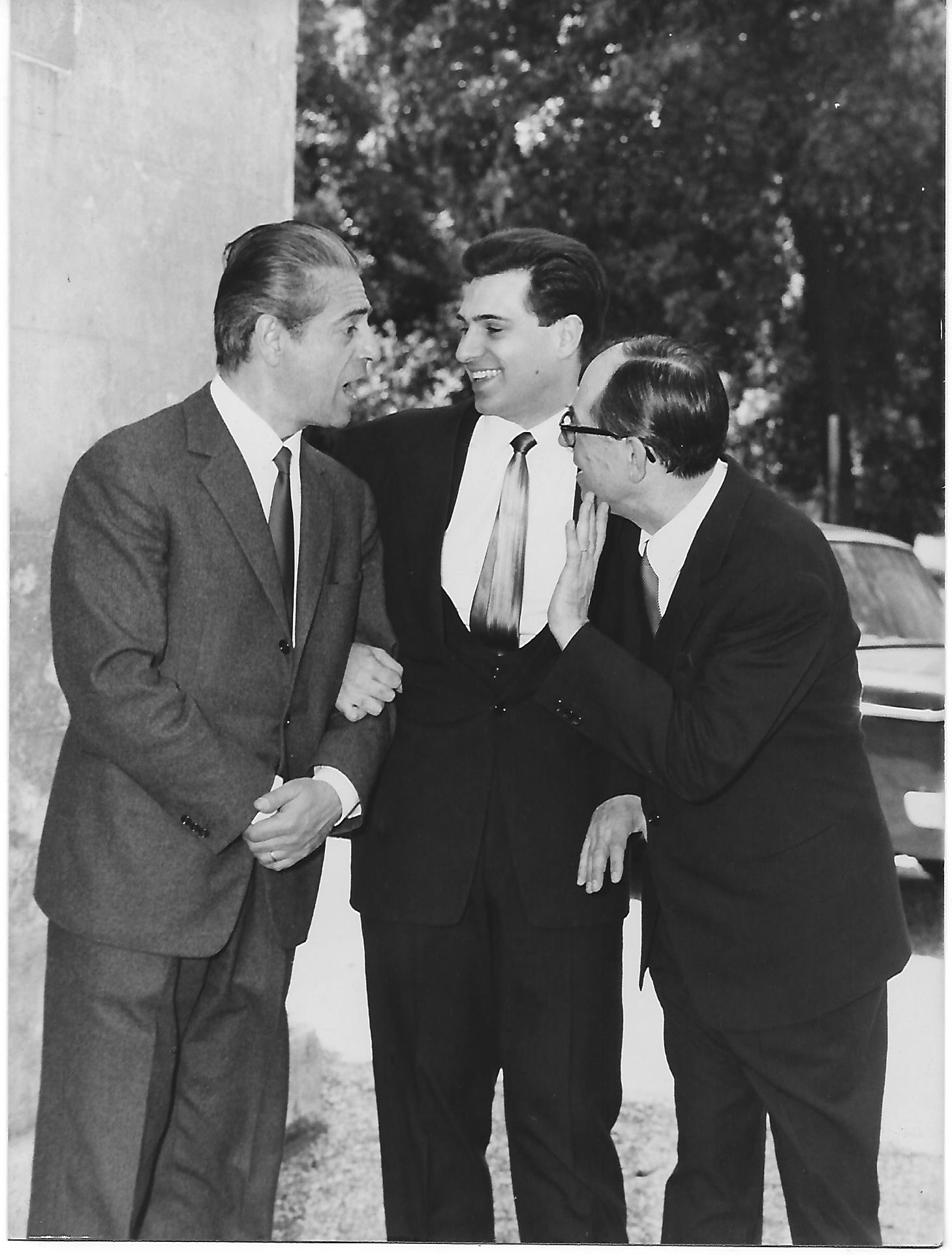
Franco Ferrara is on the left.

Franco Ferrara (Palermo, 4 July 1911 – Florence, 7 September 1985) was an Italian conductor and teacher. Among his many students are various prominent conductors, including Roberto Abbado, Riccardo Chailly, Andrew Davis and Riccardo Muti.

== Life and career ==
After obtaining diplomas in piano, violin, organ and musical composition at the Conservatory of Bologna, Ferrara began his career as violin player in Bologna, in Rome and in Florence, with the Orchestra of Maggio Musicale Fiorentino (1933 – 1940). Encouraged to take on conducting, he debuted in 1938 in Florence, beginning a brilliant career. In 1948, he retired from conducting in public concerts owing to poor health, but he kept conducting for records, and he was engaged as a teacher at the Conservatorio Santa Cecilia in Rome.

Ferrara was also present on 14 occasions at the Accademia Musicale Chigiana in Siena, Italy. Between 1964 and 1985, he lectured on conducting. His classes were attended by students from around the world, many of whom began brilliant careers that brought them onto the international music scene. Between 1974 and 1975, Ferrara also lectured on conducting at the Teatro Comunale di Bologna.

Outside Italy, Franco Ferrara enjoyed a worldwide career. He held lectures at the Radio Netherlands Worldwide in Hilversum (1958 to 1973), at the Conservatoire de Paris, at the Swiss Radio in Lugano, at the "Tibor Varga" Festival in Sion. He also worked in Philippines, and in Japan where he was invited in 1976 by Seiji Ozawa at TOHO, the Academy of Tokyo, in honor of Hideo Saito, the great conductor who was also the teacher of Ozawa. In the United States Ferrara taught at the Curtis Institute of Music (Philadelphia), the Juilliard School (New York), and the Berkshire Music Center (Tanglewood) from 1975 onward.

About 600 students took part in the courses that Ferrara held for more than thirty years. Among them may be included Jorma Panula, Myung-whun Chung, Sir Andrew Davis, Roberto Abbado, Maurizio Arena, Gürer Aykal, Riccardo Chailly, Gianluigi Gelmetti, Karen Gorden, Gilberto Serembe, Gian Luigi Zampieri, Massimo Carpegna, Donald Covert, Mario Lamberto, Riccardo Muti, Sir Gilbert Levine, Daniel Oren, Antoine Mitchell, Cal Stewart Kellogg, Kek-Tjiang Lim, Doron Salomon and Michael Bialoguski.

Ferrara was also a well-known conductor of film scores. He conducted scores by Nino Rota for The Leopard, Mario Nascimbene for Barabbas, and Toshiro Mayuzumi for John Huston's film The Bible: In the Beginning, and others. His wife was Maritza (Maria Letizia) Carini (1934-2000).
