= Arturo Viligiardi =

Italian architect

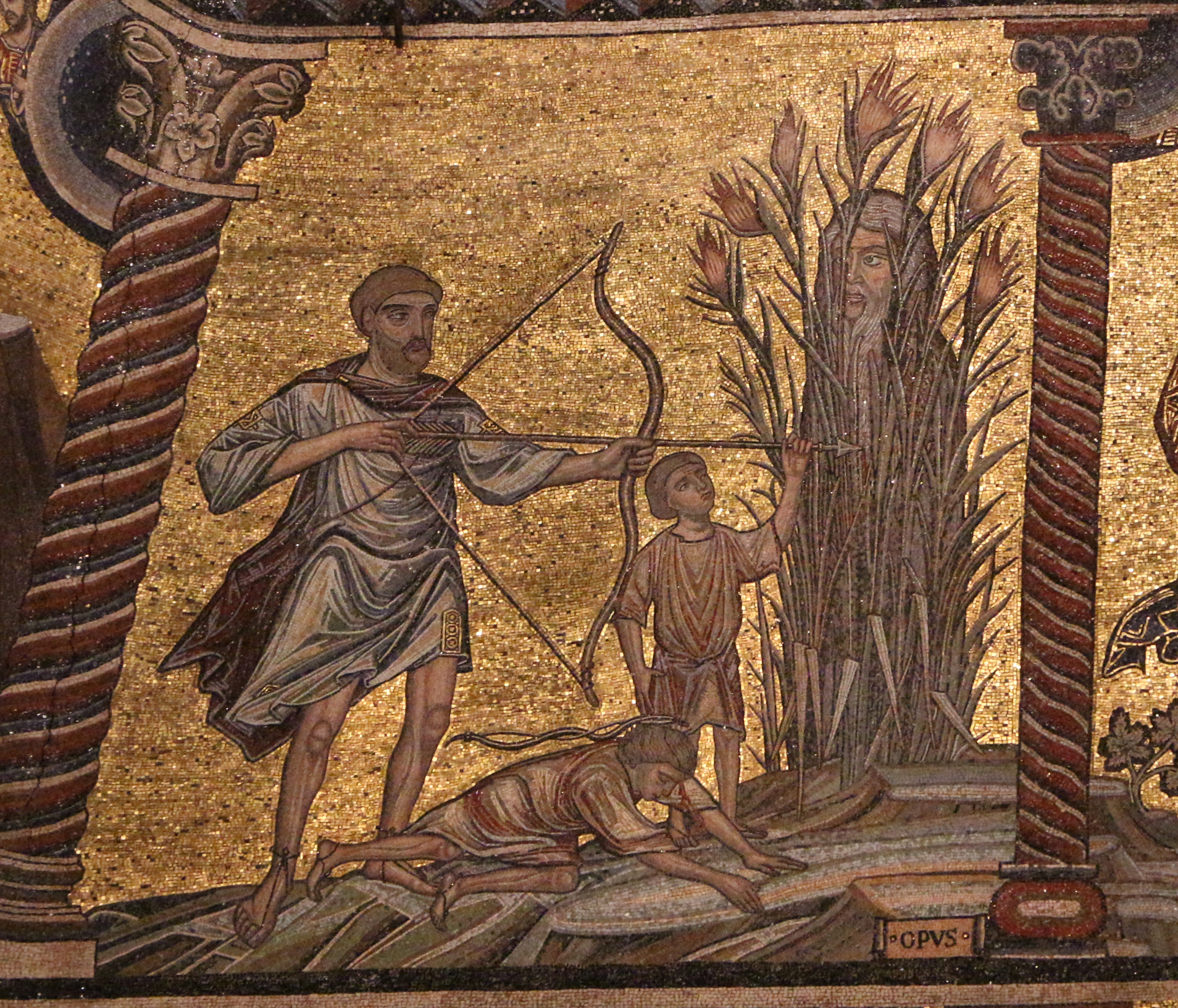
Mosaic ceiling in the Baptistery of Florence, Lamech Kills Cain and Tubalcain, restored by Arturo Viligiardi (1906)

Arturo Viligiardi (27 July 1869 – 21 October 1936) was an Italian painter, sculptor, architect and urban planner.

His heirs still own several of his sketches, drawings and notes. His work was rediscovered after featuring in Siena tra Purismo e Liberty, a 1988 exhibition in Siena.

== Life ==
=== Training ===
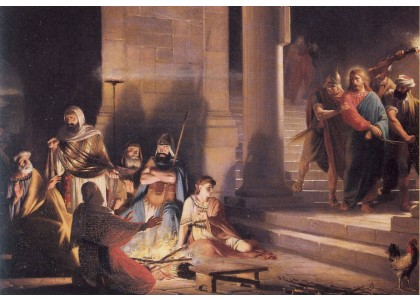
Arturo Viligiardi, The Denial of St Peter

He was born on via dei Maestri in Siena to Giuseppe, a repair worker on the railways, and Giuseppina Fallani. The sculptor Giovanni Dupré recognised Arturo's artistic vocation and invited him to join evening classes at the La Stella drawing school. In 1882 Viligiardi took the courses at the Accademia di belle arti di Siena, where he studied under Luigi Mussini and Alessandro Franchi. In 1884 his professor G. Bandini agreed to collaborate with him on paintings for Orvieto Cathedral and then further paintings on two rooms in prince D'Ambrò's villa in Naples. Viligiardi won first prize in the nude and drawing categories of the annual competition at the Accademia back in Siena. In 1888 he won the Biringucci prize for a painting entitled The Arrest of Corradino of Savoy and a prize for another entitled The Denial of Saint Peter, now in the Accademia in Siena. Both works were of the Risorgimento-historical school, inspirated by Franchi's art.

=== Early works ===
While training, he collaborated with Cesare Maccari on dome frescoes at the Sanctuary of Loreto and Genoa's chiesa della Consolazione. Viligiardi's 1890 Christ and the Woman Taken in Adultery show how heavily influenced he still was by Maccari. His 1891 Samson as a Prisoner won a Ministry of Public Education competition for a four-year pension. He presented 39 different designs for the competition to design the facade of Arezzo Cathedral, but that competition was then cancelled - one of them was exhibited at the 1904 St Louis International Exhibition.

At San Secondiano Co-Cathedral in Chiusi he painted a fresco entitled St Catherine's Vision of the Virgin Mary, experimenting with the "finto mosaico" (fake mosaic) technique, influenced by Byzantine art. He also exhibited at the Mary Magdalene at Calvary (1894) and the cartoons for the fresco at the "Esposizioni riunite" in Milan. He next worked in Rome at San Clemente al Laterano and on Malta at San'Agostino Church, followed by a fresco in the apse of Santa Maria Assunta, the parish church in Allerona. In 1898 he produced the painting St Margaret of Alacoque in Ecstacy before a Vision of the Holy Cross.

He painted a Madonna and Child on a gold background for the chapel at palazzo Gianturco in Naples and also painted frescoes on the chapel walls of Christ in Glory with Angels. Inspired by the Neapolitan painter Francesco Paolo Michetti, in 1895 he produced Vita, now in the Galleria nazionale d'arte moderna e contemporanea in Rome. Later attracted by symbolist themes, he simplified his pictorial representations to concentrate on figures and eliminate unnecessary details – examples of this are his Calvary and Purgatory. He also decorated the San Lorenzo chapel in Rome's San Paolo fuori le mura before painting frescoes for the same basilica's quadriportico.

=== New commissions ===
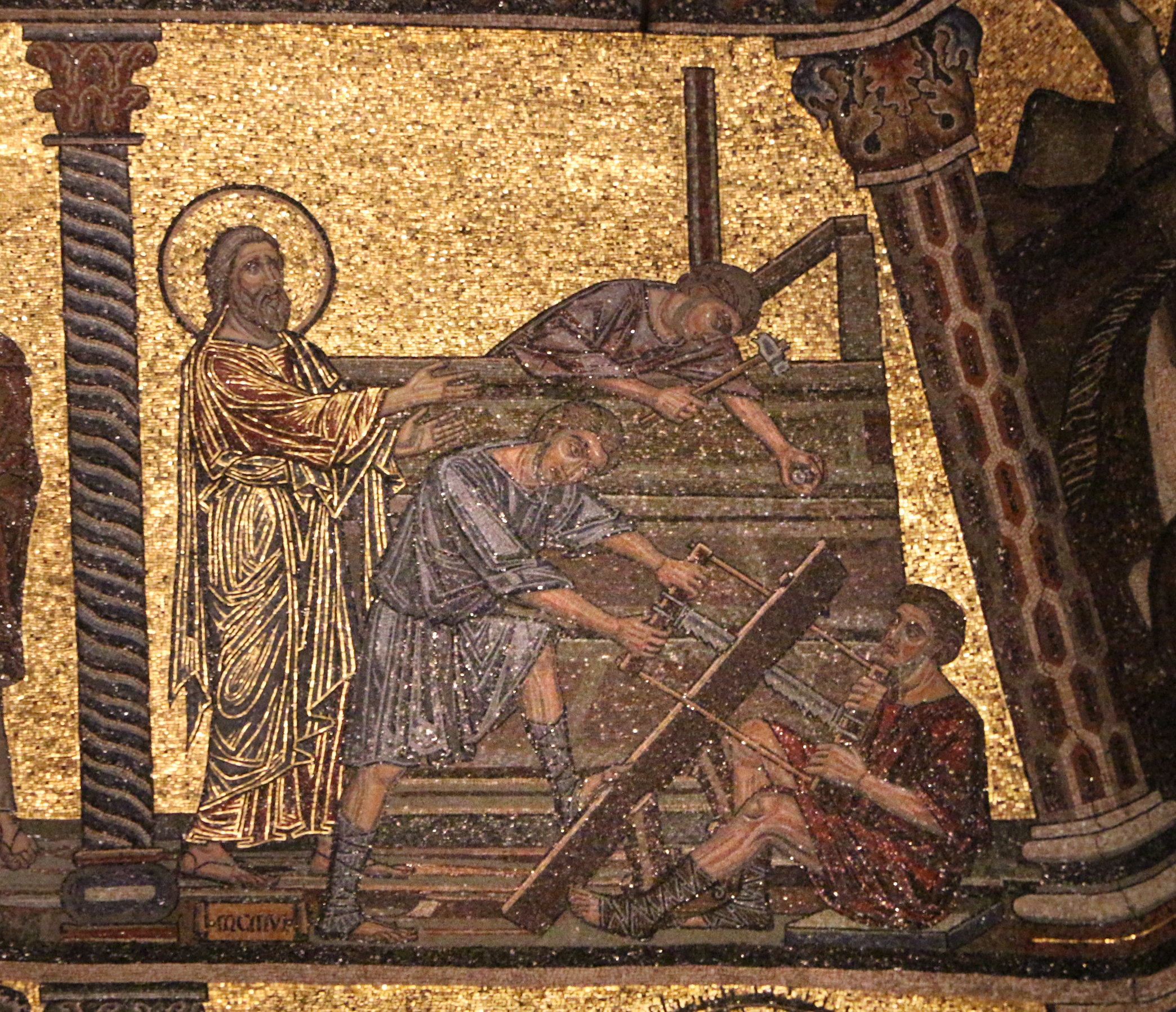
Noah Building the Ark, mosaic panel by Arturo Viligiardi (1906)

He exhibited The Temptation of St Catherine at the 1904 International Exhibition in Rome. He then assisted the architect Guglielmo Calderini in the "Roma Moderna" redesign of Rome's street plan and in building the city's palazzo di Giustizia. In Florence he produced new canvases for the Cathedral to replace earlier ones which had deteriorated too badly to be restored and designed three new panels of scenes from the Book of Genesis to replace medieval ones which had collapsed from the mosaic ceiling of the Florence Baptistery about a century earlier.

He designed a cottage for himself on via Po in Rome, whilst in 1909 marquess Chigi-Zondadari commissioned a painting entitled La Flora from him for his palazzo Primoli in Rome. The Società Cultori di Architettura di Roma commissioned designed from him on "Roma sparita" (vanished Rome). In 1909 he was appointed to the new chair in "Decorative art and building furnishings" at the Accademia in Siena, a chair which seems to have been set up especially for him. He produced designs for the Accademia Tedesca's Villa Massimo, again in Rome.

Count Guido Chigi-Saracini entrusted him with rebuilding palazzo Chigi-Saracini in Siena and designing its new interiors, before also commissioning a sculpture entitled La Riconoscenza from the artist for the Cappella del Voto in Siena Cathedral. From 1916 to 1926 Viligiardi was director of Siena's Istituto di Belle Arti.

=== Final years ===
In 1928 he sculpted Bust of St Catherine for the town of Pincio. He took on a wrought iron factory in Siena and built count Galeotti's villa in Chiusi. In 1930 a gallery in Genoa hosted a retrospective of his works. Count Chigi-Saracini still asked him for the St Catherine. He next produced a series of designs for Siena's traffic planning before producing his final work, the Monument to the Fallen at Certaldo. He died in Alexandria.

== Bibliography (in Italian) ==
- Pietro Rossi, Il palazzo Chigi-Saracini e l'opera di Arturo Viligiardi, Siena, Stab. arti Grafiche Lazzeri, 1928, SBN IT\ICCU\CUB\0563197. Disegni di Arturo Viligiardi.
- Marziali, Giovanni (1988). "Arturo Viligiardi". In Batazzi, Marta (ed.). Siena tra purismo e liberty (in Italian). A. Mondadori.
- Valerio Bartolini and Antonello Mennucci (editors), Titolo Vita e morte: 1894-95 Arturo Viligiardi a San Gimignano, Comune di San Gimignano, Musei Senesi, 2001, SBN IT\ICCU\LO1\0556626.
