= Santa Maria Assunta in Cellole =

Church in San Gimignano, Italy

Coordinates: 43°29′05.83″N 11°00′22.46″E

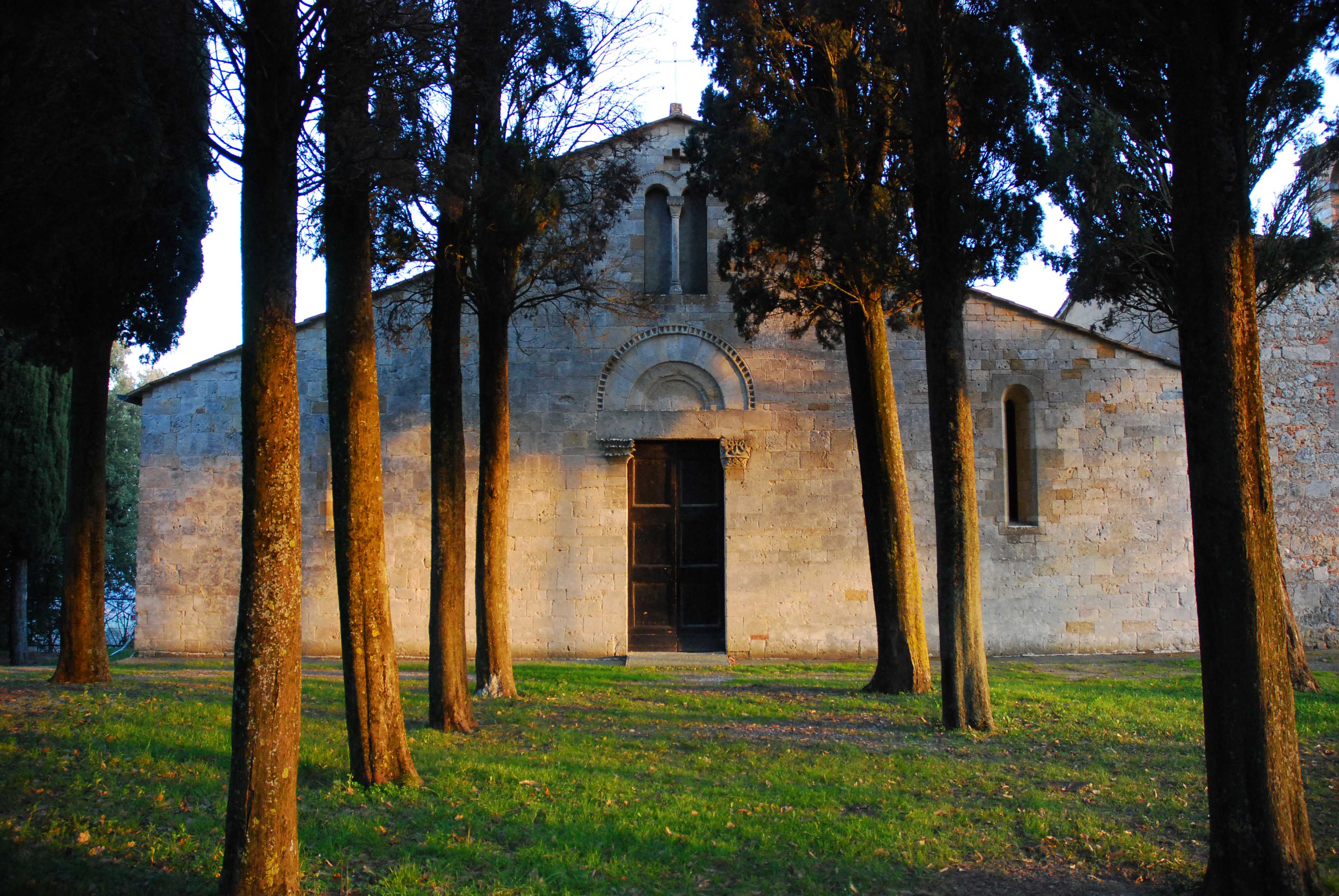
Façade.

Santa Maria Assunta in Cellole is a church and former pieve located in Pancole, in the municipality of San Gimignano, province of Siena, Tuscany, central Italy. Mentioned for the first time in 1109, it was rebuilt several times between the 12th and 13th centuries, and was consecrated in 1238.

== Architecture ==
The building has a basilica with three naves, divided by columns and pillars, ending in a single semicircular apse, both inside and outside, which has a decorative arch, set to finely carved shelves, within which are embedded lunettes decorated with the typical Valdelsa motifs. The presbytery is raised above the nave.

It is the product of several phases of construction, the oldest of which is the apse. The second, dating to the end of 12th century, regarded the system of the colonnade, while the arrangement of the side walls dates from the 13th century. The façade is made with regular joists in travertine and is the result of a restoration of the 1920s. Inside, the baptismal font (also in travertine) and parts of the 14th-century fresco are adorned with figures of saints.

The portal is surmounted by a bezel and a double, very elaborate mullioned window, above which is another, smaller window in the shape of a cross. To the left of the bezel, one of the stones forming the wall has an inscription that testifies to the date of consecration.

== Sources ==
- Italo Moretti – Renato Stopani, Chiese romaniche in Valdelsa, Firenze, 1968, pp. 201– 208.
- Luigi Pecori, Storia della terra di San Gimignano, a cura di Valerio Bartoloni, Certaldo (Fi), Arti Grafiche Nencini, 2006 (rist. anastatica dell'edizione del 1853), pp. 406 – 408, 559 – 561.
- Renato Stopani – Marco Frati, Chiese medievali della Valdelsa. I territori della via Francigena tra Firenze, Lucca e Volterra, Empoli, Editori dell'Acero, 1995, pp. 139 – 141. ISBN 88-86975-18-X
- Il Chianti e la Valdelsa senese, collana "I Luoghi della Fede", Milano, Mondadori, 1999, pp. 90 – 91. ISBN 88-04-46794-0
