= Émile Vuillermoz =

Émile-Jean-Joseph Vuillermoz (23 May 1878 – 2 March 1960) was a French critic in the areas of music, film, drama and literature. He was also a composer, but abandoned this for criticism.

== Early life ==
Émile Vuillermoz was born in Lyon in 1878. He studied literature and law at University of Lyon, then became a music student at the Conservatoire de Paris, his teachers being Jules Massenet, Gabriel Fauré, Antoine Taudou and Daniel Fleuret. Among his fellow students was Maurice Ravel, who became his lifelong friend.

He was a member of Les Apaches, along with Ravel, Igor Stravinsky, Manuel de Falla and others.

== Career ==
He had early success as a writer of songs and operettas, and with settings of French and Canadian folk songs, but chose to follow the career of a critic instead. He wrote initially for the Mercure musical, and then he edited the Revue musicale SIM (Société internationale de musique).

With Ravel, Paul Dukas, Florent Schmitt, Charles Koechlin and others, he co-founded the Société musicale indépendante (SMI). Its first concert, on 20 April 1910, contained three world premieres: Gabriel Fauré's song cycle "La chanson d'Ève" (its first complete performance; excerpts had been presented earlier); Claude Debussy's "D'un cahier d'esquisses", performed by Maurice Ravel; and Ravel's own Ma mère l'oye in its original version for piano 4-hands, played by Jeanne Leleu and Geneviève Durony.

His interests extended beyond music to drama and literature, and he wrote for Le Temps, L'Excelsior, L'Illustration, L'Éclair and Candide. He also contributed to the Encyclopédie française, and to foreign journals.

In 1916 he described Debussy as "a pupil of Claude Monet", a description the composer was happy to accept.

Also from around 1916 Émile Vuillermoz was at the forefront of serious film criticism in France, often using the pseudonyms Gabriel Darcy and Claude Bonvin. In 1924 he helped organise the first important exhibition on film at the Musée Galliera, "L'Exposition de l'art dans le cinéma français".

In 1921, Federico Mompou's Scènes d'enfants (1915–18), performed by Ferdinand Motte-Lacroix, inspired Vuillermoz to proclaim Mompou "the only disciple and successor to Claude Debussy". He wrote "in the Middle Ages the people would have condemned to the stake an artist gifted with such powers".

Ravel's 50th birthday in March 1925 was celebrated by an edition of the Revue musicale devoted to him, with contributions from many people including Vuillermoz.

In 1933 he published his work Clotilde et Alexandre Sakharoff about the expressionist dancers Alexander Sakharoff and Clotilde von Derp, who were at that time based in Paris.

In 1935, Émile Vuillermoz and Jacques Thibaud started a new project, called Cinéphonies, to create a series of short films of musicians performing classical music. They employed directors such as Max Ophüls and Dimitri Kirsanoff, and artists such as Elisabeth Schumann, Alfred Cortot, Alexander Brailowsky and Ninon Vallin. The composers represented were Albéniz, Chopin, Debussy, Fauré, Mompou, Schubert and Szymanowski.

In 1936 he was a member of the jury of the 4th Venice International Film Festival. Following on from this, he played a significant role in the creation of the Cannes Film Festival. He and fellow film historian René Jeanne suggested the idea to Jean Zay, the Minister of Public Instruction at the time, who liked the idea and supported its establishment.

After Ravel's death in 1937, Vuillermoz wrote a substantial review of the composer's oeuvre, Maurice Ravel par quelques-uns de ses familiers, for the memorial volume published by some of his friends in 1939. Also in 1937 he was the uncredited musical director for the classic film La Grande Illusion.

He founded the International Besançon Competition for Young Conductors in 1951, as an adjunct to the Besançon International Music Festival, founded in 1948.

Vuillermoz's publications included:

- Musique d'aujourd'hui (1923)
- La Vie amoureuse de Chopin (1927)
- Cinquante ans de musique française
- Visages de musiciens
- Clothilde et Alexandre Sakharoff
- books on Ravel, Chopin, Fauré and Debussy.

Émile Vuillermoz was appointed an Officer of the Legion of Honour. He died in Paris in 1960, aged 81.
