= Guido Chigi Saracini =

Italian patrician and music composer (1880–1965)

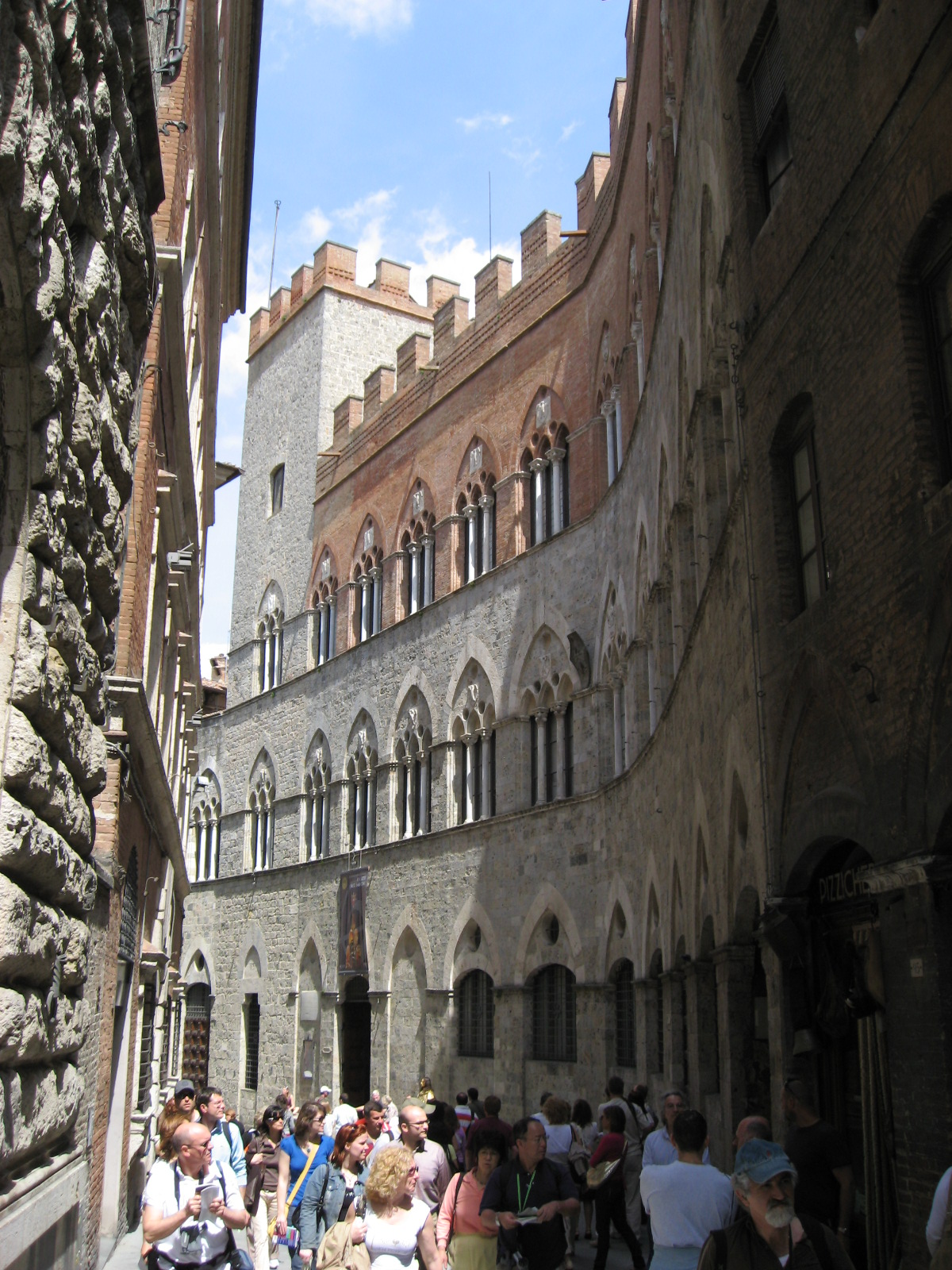
Palazzo Chigi-Saracini, Siena

Count Guido Chigi Saracini (Siena, 8 March 1880 – Siena, 18 November 1965), full name Guido Chigi degli Useppi Saracini Lucherini, was an Italian patrician, a musical patron and composer, and a public administrator. Having inherited the Palazzo Chigi-Saracini in the centre of the city of Siena, Tuscany, he applied his musical instincts to his new opportunities, restored the Palazzo in 1923, and established a concert society and later (1932) a musical academy there. The Accademia Chigiana, which flourishes today, grew under his supervision into a famous institution for higher instruction, research and performance in chamber music, playing an important role in the revival of Italian baroque instrumental music, and in the advocacy and performance of contemporary Italian classical music.

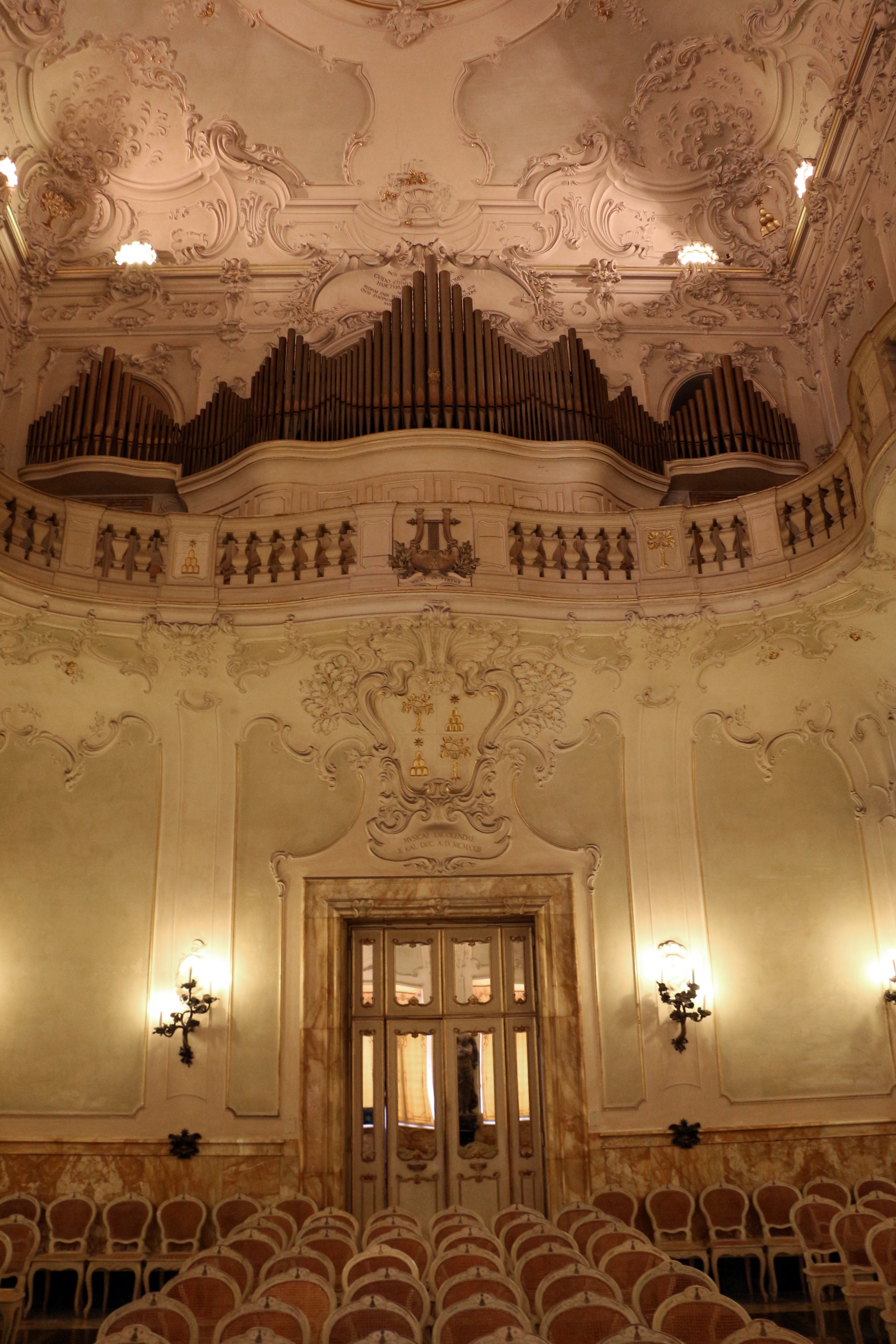
Concert Hall at the Palazzo Chigi Saracini, auditorium and organ.

Chigi Saracini, who lent his authority to various cultural projects and public forums in Siena, through his academy and through the September music festival "Settimane musicali" which he established in 1939, gave to Siena an international musical reputation: leading world musicians brought their experience and example to its work and performances, while the international tours of the Quintetto Chigiano, and the Quartetto Italiano (which coalesced at the academy in 1942) spread the example of its excellence. During his life, Count Chigi Saracini maintained personal involvement in the development and direction of his Academy, and endowed it as a Foundation in 1961, thereby assuring its continuation after his death.

== Education and first years ==
Guido Chigi Saracini was a scion of the noble Sienese House of Chigi, of ancient origins and of diverse musical interests: one of his forebears was a pupil of Claudio Monteverdi and others were violists and singers. Guido, the son of Antonio Chigi Saracini and Giulia Griccioli, studied violin at the Florence Conservatory. In 1905 he married Bianca Kaschmann, daughter of the Austrian-American baritone Joseph Kaschmann. On the death of his uncle Fabio Chigi Saracini (killed in a hunting accident) in 1906, which left Guido heir to an extremely wealthy inheritance including the 14th-century Palazzo Chigi Saracini in Siena, he gave up his studies to dedicate himself to the administration of his finances, and possessions, and (as was required by his uncle's will) he took on the surname Lucherini.

In the course of his life he received numerous honorary administrative appointments (variously, Deputy of the Fondazione Monte dei Paschi di Siena; adviser to the Archconfraternity of the Misericordia in Borgo San Lorenzo; rector of the Administrative Council for the Maintenance of the Cathedral of Siena (Opera della Metropolitana); Prior of the Autonomous Contrada of Istrice in Siena), but he never gave up on his work in music, in which he operated as a patron and organizer of events. He set out to ensure that his city of Siena should enjoy an international musical life.

In 1908 he established the "Quintetto Senese" (the Siena Quintet, a pianoforte and string quartet ensemble led by violinist Piero Baglioni), whose concerts he funded and the income from which was distributed beneficently. Among various events arising periodically or for special occasions, he promoted the celebration of the Giuseppe Verdi centenary in 1913 by the publication of a volume of scholarly studies on Verdian subjects, and a performance of the Requiem under Edoardo Mascheroni at the Basilica of San Francesco, Siena, with the assistance of Arrigo Boito.

Between May 1915 and July 1917, he served as a volunteer motorist for the Red Cross, and as an ambulance driver. A diary of his experiences survives and has been published. On his return to Siena he set about the restoration of the Palazzo Chigi-Saracini, in which the artist and architect Arturo Viligiardi was employed. This work, which came to completion in 1923, included the installation of a rococo-style concert hall, to serve which he established a concert association named "Micat in Vertice" (the family motto: "it shines out from the summit"). In September 1923 King Vittorio Emmanuele III confirmed his hereditary title as Count, and gave consent to the formal unification of his lineage with that of Saracini. In 1926 his marriage, which had sunk into a permanent separation, was formally annulled in the Apostolic Tribunal of the Roman Rota.

== Connections with Respighi, Casella and contemporary music ==
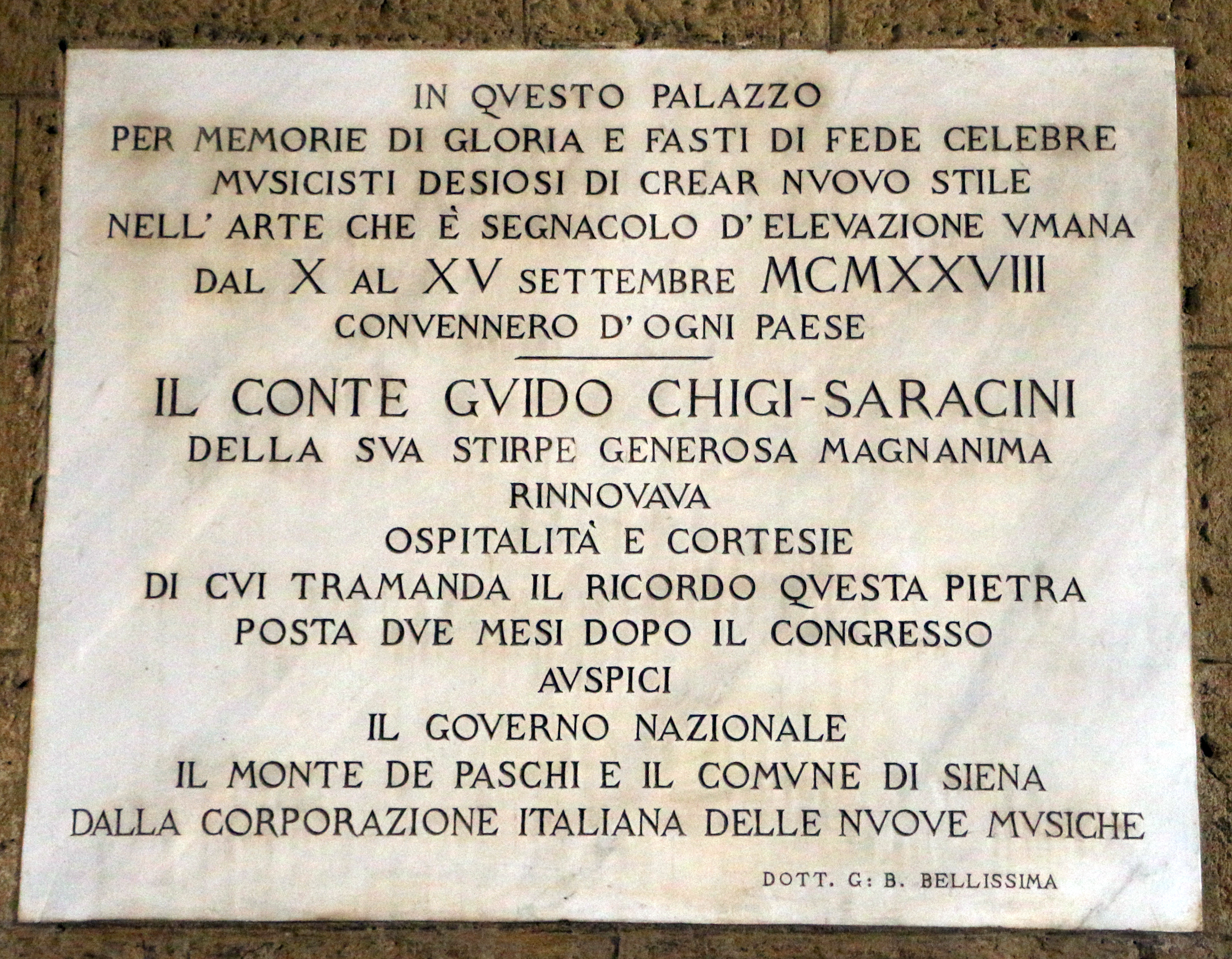
Plaque commemorating the 1928 festival.

For all that he was not greatly drawn to modern music, the Count had a fruitful association with Ottorino Respighi, who dedicated two compositions to him. While visiting the Palazzo as a guest in 1926, Respighi noticed an old family snuffbox decorated with musical scenes, and amused himself by composing the Suite della tabacchieria on the different subjects. At the sixth festival of the "Società Italiana di Musica Contemporanea" in 1928, which the Count invited Alfredo Casella to host at the palazzo, world premieres of music by Sergei Prokofiev, Manuel de Falla, William Walton, by Casella himself, by Maurice Ravel, Anton Webern and Paul Hindemith were given.

In 1930 Respighi composed his Lauda per la Natività del Signore, dedicated to Chigi Saracini, which was premiered on the same night (22 November 1930) as the Suite della tabacchieria, with the Choir of Santa Cecilia of Rome, conducted by the composer, at the "Micat in Vertice" Society in Siena. There were repeat performances in Rome and Florence. The Lauda, set to words attributed to Jacopone da Todi, is a substantial work for soloists, choir, a sextet of pastoral wind instruments, and four-handed pianoforte. The original autograph manuscripts of these works are still held at the Palazzo Chigi-Saracini.

== The Academy ==
In 1932 his musical projects reached maturity in his foundation of the Accademia Chigiana, a centre of advanced musical education still flourishing in present times. It was for outstanding young pupils, and the instruction was intended to instil confidence and approval in their abilities, to apply the stimulus of positive encouragement, and the enthusiasm associated with the fulfilment of a dream, as the Count himself expressed it. The studies included courses in conducting, composition, piano, organ, violin, cello, and lyric vocalization, and Fernando Germani, Arrigo Serato, Arturo Bonucci, Alfredo Casella, Giulia Varesi Boccabadati and Gemma Bellincioni were among the original instructors. Casella, in particular, had a very lasting friendship with the Count and a most influential connection with the Accademia.

== The "Settimane musicali" and the rediscovery of the baroque composers ==
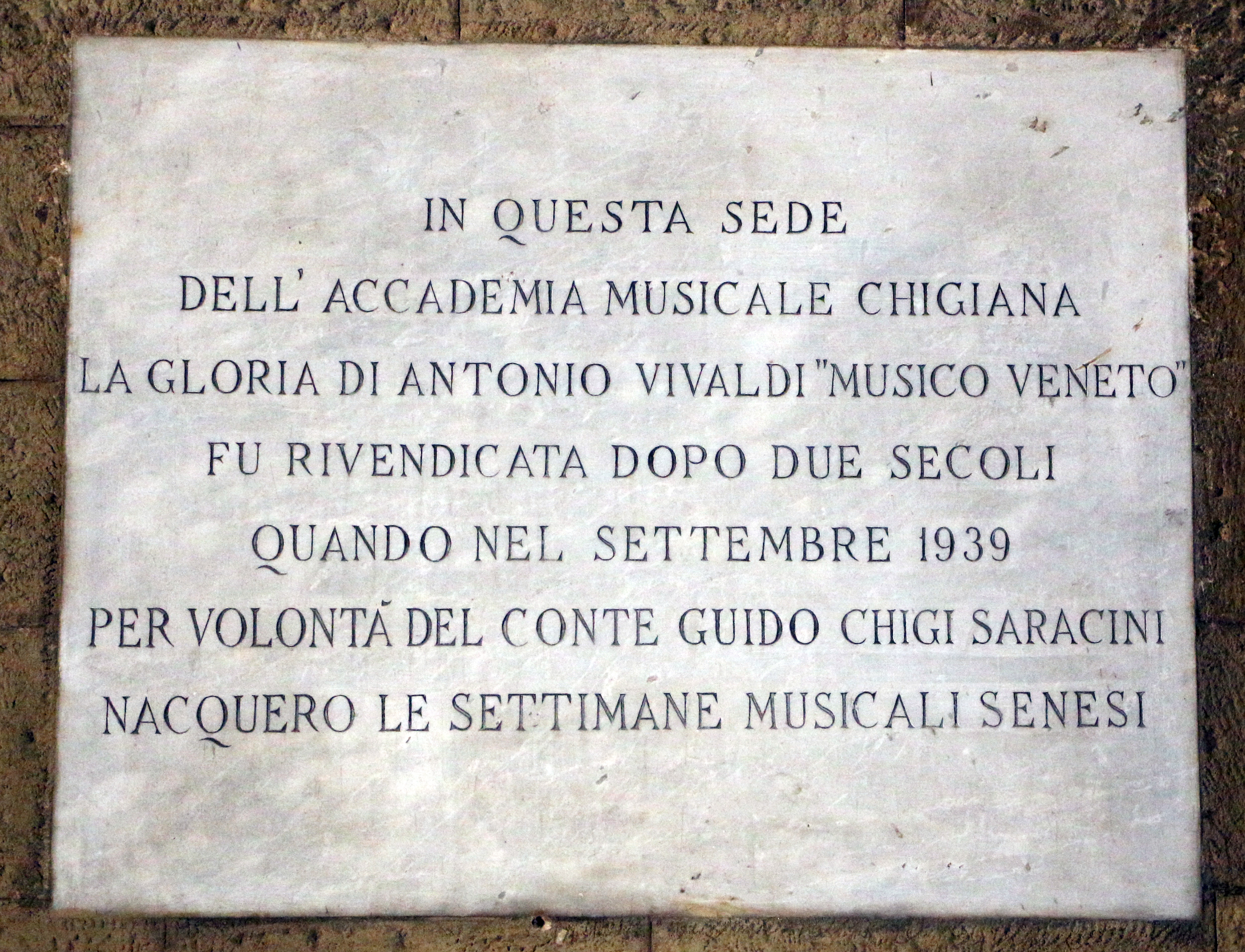
Plaque commemorating the foundation of the "Settimane musicali".

In 1933 Olga Rudge, a notable violinist and a companion of Ezra Pound, became a secretary at the Accademia, and over the following years she and Pound, from homes at Venezia and Rapallo, became central figures in the "Vivaldi revival", researching the autograph manuscripts which until then had lain buried in the Foà-Giordano Collections of the Biblioteca nazionale di Torino. In 1936 she took part in the season of "Concerti Tigulliani" (in Ligurian Tigullio) dedicated to Vivaldi, which Pound organized. Having failed to establish a Vivaldi study centre in Venice, in 1938 Rudge founded the Centro di Studi Vivaldiani at the Accademia.

In 1939, with Casella, Chigi Saracini set up the "Settimane musicali Senesi" ("Musical Weeks of Siena") of the Accademia, to be held in September at the conclusion of the courses of instruction: the first was devoted entirely to Vivaldi. These "settimane", which arose from the idea of the Festival Settimana of 1928, became a landmark in the rediscovery of Italian instrumental music of the 1600s and 1700s: music of Vivaldi, Alessandro and Domenico Scarlatti, of Pergolesi, Galuppi and Caldara was edited and performed. In 1941 the Count edited a volume of Notes and documents on the Early Venetian School, for the celebratory week of concerts.

In 1950 there appeared the Count's memoir of the baroque keyboard musician Azzolino Bernardino della Ciaja (1671–1755).

=== Soloists and ensembles ===
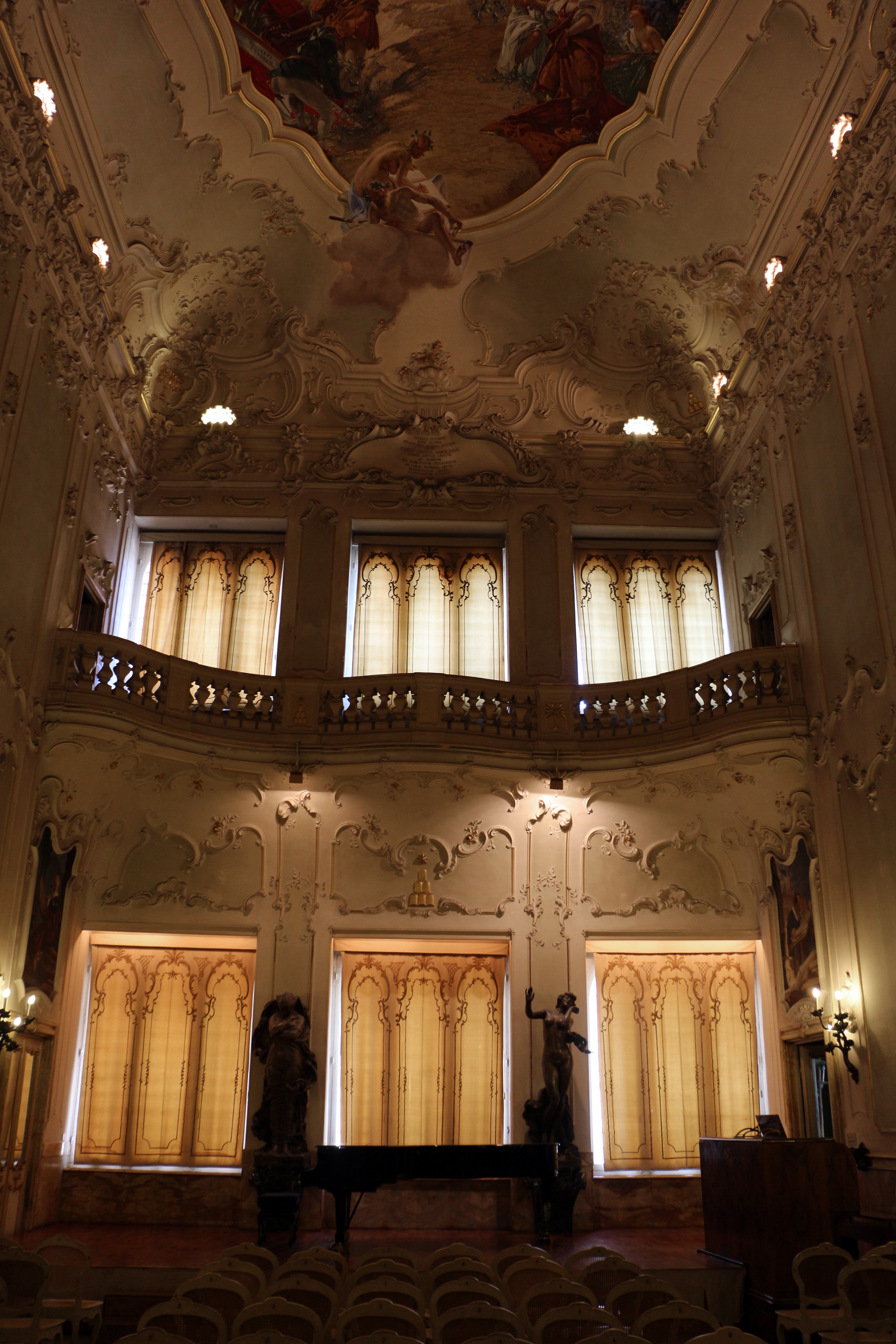
Concert Hall, Palazzo Chigi Saracini.

All through Count Chigi Saracini's life, the Accademia Chigiana (through the "Micat in Vertice" Society) and the Siena "Settimane musicali" hosted the most influential international soloists, among whom the Dizionario Biografico, in a formulation of inclusivity, mentions the pianists Walter Gieseking, Wilhelm Kempff, Arthur Rubinstein, Vladimir Horowitz and Alfred Cortot, the violinists Bronislaw Huberman, Nathan Milstein, Gioconda de Vito and Salvatore Accardo, the cellists Gaspar Cassado, Enrico Mainardi, Pablo Casals and André Navarra, the harpsichordist Wanda Landowska, the guitarist Andrès Segovia, and singers Suzanne Danco and Elisabeth Schwarzkopf.

The particular accent upon advanced chamber music instruction and the education of instrumental ensembles, caused Count Chigi Saracini in 1939 to establish the Quintetto Chigiano, a pianoforte and string quintet dedicated especially to the repertoire for that combination. The personnel were selected by the Count from outstanding young players who had attended the Accademia and now became professors and teachers in addition to their concert work. They were led by the violinist Riccardo Brengola, and the ensemble worked together until Count Chigi's death in 1965, when Brengola (whom the Count appointed director of the chamber music courses in 1946) instead formed the Sestetto d'Archi Chigiano, a string sextet.

Another very memorable ensemble which coalesced at the Accademia was the Quartetto Italiano: Borciani, Pegreffi and Rossi having met in 1940 at the Concorso Nazionale in La Spezia, they met again at the Accademia Chigiana in summer 1942, where Bonucci put them together with violist Lionello Forzanti for the session, to work on the Debussy Quartet (which they performed in September). In 1945 they studied together at Borciani's house in Reggio Emilia, and it was in this formation that the Quartet made its public debut in the same year. Forzanti was later replaced by Piero Farulli.

The desire to discover and promote other gems of early Italian music prompted the Count to establish the Madrigalisti dell'Accademia Chigiana in 1950.

== Promotion of studies in musicology, collections and composition ==
He furthermore promoted musicological reviews and researches (the Chigiana Review, and the "Quaderni dell'Accademia"), and he formed collections of paintings, musical instruments, autographs and rare manuscripts (of Cimarosa, Frescobaldi, Pacini, Spontini, Donizetti, Rossini, Verdi, Boito, Gounod), and more than one hundred editions of the 1500s and 1600s of non-operatic vocal music by authors such as Luca Marenzio and Giovanni Pierluigi da Palestrina. For his own music, he enjoyed composing to lyrics from the nineteenth-century poets (principally Trilussa and D'Annunzio), and with a lauda for Our Lady of Providence (Maria Santissima Madre della Divina Provvidenza) in her sanctuary at Pancole near San Gimignano. Olga Rudge assisted him in the preparation of his Memoirs, published in 1958.

== Archive ==
The personal archive of Chigi Saracini was acquired in 1992 by the Accademia Chigiana. Among the items of interest, in addition to the autograph manuscripts of composers mentioned above, there are the letters which Chigi Saracini exchanged with eminent figures in world culture (including Ezra Pound, Sibilla Aleramo, Bernard Berenson and Ranuccio Bianchi Bandinelli), and all the documentation relating to the activity of the Accademia: diaries, reports and letters from leading musicians of the 1900s (such as Mascagni, Anna Moffo, Sergiu Celibidache and Alfred Cortot, and many, many others). Interesting also is his correspondence with members of the European aristocracy, with Umberto II, with Elisabeth of Bavaria, Queen of the Belgians, and, above all, with Marie-José, Queen of Italy.

== Honours ==
- Cavaliere dell'Ordine civile di Savoia (Casa Savoia), 15 September 1961.

To commemorate the 50th anniversary of Count Guido's death, an exhibition was held at the Palazzo from October 2015 to June 2016, entitled Ricordanze. Guido Chigi Saracini e le Arti.
