= Riccardo Brengola =

Italian violinist and music teacher (1917–2004)

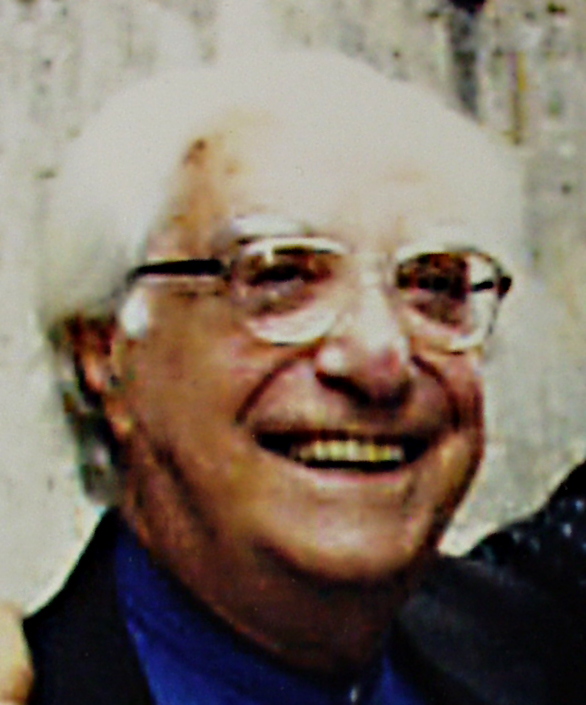
- Riccardo Brengola, Siena
- Born: 18 March 1917; Naples, Italy
- Died: 16 May 2004 (aged 87); Rome, Italy
- Education: Conservatoire De Casablanca; Accademia Nazionale di Santa Cecilia; Accademia Musicale Chigiana
- Occupations: Violinist; composer; professor
- Title: Emeritus professor
- Spouse: Guliana Bordoni (m. 1941)
- Children: 3
- Parents: Carlo Brengola (father); Maria Esposito (mother)
- Musical career
- Genres: Classical
- Instrument: Violin
- Years active: 1936–2004
- Label: BNF Collection

Riccardo Brengola (18 March 1917 – 16 May 2004) was an Italian violinist and professor. He was associated with early Italian chamber music and with the performance of contemporary Italian classical music. For several decades, he was the Professor Emeritus of chamber music at the Accademia Musicale Chigiana in Siena, and from 1939 to 1966, he was the leader of the only piano quintet ensemble, the Quintetto Chigiano. His influence as a teacher also spread beyond Siena, through courses or classes at other major Italian Conservatories and to Ireland, Argentina, Spain and Japan. He maintained his career as a concert violin soloist and as an orchestral conductor, and was awarded the status of Commendatore of the Italian Republic in 1982.

== Early life ==
Riccardo Brengola was born in Naples on 18 March 1917, the son of Carlo Brengola and Maria Esposito. His father was a cellist, who had a passion for making stringed instruments, but the extremely harsh economic conditions in the immediate post-war period caused the family to emigrate to Casablanca, Morocco in 1919. Carlo Brengola opened a music shop which sold instruments, sheet music and albums. When Riccardo turned three, his father decided to make him a violinist, making him his first instrument and teaching him. Child Riccardo Brengola performed Arabian music in public.

== Musical education ==
At the age of six he was enrolled in the Casablanca Music Conservatory, where he was taught by Lucien Salin, a graduate of the Lucien Capet school. Riccardo also attended a Spanish primary school where he learned his fourth language: at this point he spoke Spanish, French, Arabic, and the Neapolitan dialect. He did not speak Italian.

At eleven, he graduated from the Conservatory, and in 1929, Mussolini offered him a bursary in Italy, which allowed him to move to Rome where he joined the classes of Arrigo Serato. A few years later, he graduated from the Accademia Nazionale di Santa Cecilia in Rome and from the Accademia Musicale Chigiana in Siena.

== Early career ==
Brengola took part in competitions and won prizes and titles, amongst them the Taormina, and also the Accademia Chigiana Prize for improvement. In 1937, he was the only Italian among the winners of the Eugene Ysaye First International Congress in Brussels (the Queen Elisabeth Competition). In 1946, he won the Geneva International Music Competition.

In 1938, he met the pianist Giuliana Bordoni in Siena, a student in Alfredo Casella's class at the Accademia Chigiana. At the time she was 18, and he was 21. They married in the summer of 1941 at the headquarters of the Accademia Chigiana, in the Palazzo Chigi Saracini chapel. Their marriage lasted almost 60 years, and three children were born. They formed a musical duo, and gave concerts through Italy and in Spain, France, Germany and Russia, and got accolades because of this. They recorded the complete Mozart Violin Sonatas for Radiotelevisione Italiana. In the 1950s and 1960s, the Brengolas had a trio with the cellist Benedetto Mazzacurati.

== Quintetto Chigiano ==
In 1939, Count Chigi-Saracini decided to create a new chamber music group called Quintetto Chigiano, which was formed by choosing the best students of the Accademia. The people chosen were: Riccardo Brengola (first violin); Ferruccio Scaglia (second violin) (later Mario Benvenuti and Angelo Stefanato); Giovanni Leone (viola); Lino Filippini (cello); and Sergio Lorenzi (piano). While in this group, Brengola did not discontinue his solo performances and his activity as conductor alongside his engagement with chamber music. His work as a conductor, in particular, arose after he had studied in Paul van Kempen's classes at the Chigiana.

In 1946, Count Chigi-Saracini granted Brengola directorship of the Chamber Music courses at the Accademia Chigiana, a position which he held until 1997. By 1956, the Quintet had recently given more than a thousand concerts in countries including Italy, Germany, England, France, Holland, Belgium and Spain, had taken part in major European festivals, and had newly completed a highly successful tour of Central and South America: their repertoire reflected Brengola's preoccupations both with early Italian chamber music and with the works of contemporary composers.

Alberto Ginastera dedicated his Piano Quintet op. 29 (1963) to the Chigiano, who gave the first performance at the Teatro La Fenice in that year. In 1966, the year after Guido Chigi's death, the Quintetto was dissolved and was re-formed as the Sestetto Chigiano d'Archi (transl. Chigiano String Sextet): in addition to Brengola, its membership included Felice Cusano (later Giovanni Guglielmo) (second violin); Mario Benvenuti and Tito Riccardi (violas); and Alain Meunier and Adriano Vendramelli (cellos).

== Teaching ==
In 1941, he was appointed head teacher at the Music Conservatory of Pesaro. He then taught, in turn, at the conservatories in Venice, Bologna, Naples and Rome. In 1946, Count Chigi made him course director of the ensemble music course at the Accademia Chigiana. He taught there until 1997. Brengola taught chamber music for many years, facilitating training courses at the Accademia di Santa Cecilia in Rome, where he was an academic and a member of the Board of Directors. He taught courses and seminars in other music institutes, including those in Buenos Aires, Barcelona, Dublin, and Tokyo.

Teaching was one of his largest passions (among his students were Salvatore Accardo, Bruno Giuranna, Sayaka Shoji, Uto Ughi and the Tokyo Quintet), to which he remained greatly committed. As Constantin Zanidache, a close collaborator of his for over twenty years at the Accademia Chigiana, wrote, "during his lessons, he was able to create highly intense and emotive atmospheres. His lessons, often very strict, still never failed to make his students fall in love."

== Instruments and repertoire ==
In the course of his career Brengola played numerous violins: mainly the violins of his friend Ansaldo Poggi; but also the "Contessa Crespi" (1747) by Giovanni Battista Guadagnini; the "Conte di Fontana" (1702) by Antonio Stradivari (previously owned by David Oistrakh); and, in the eighties, an instrument made by Roberto Regazzi, a violin maker of Bologna.

His concert activity was particularly dedicated to rediscovering the works of Boccherini for piano and violin and for quintets and sextets, which he recorded on vinyl. (The role of the Academy in the rediscovery and exploration of the manuscripts of Antonio Vivaldi is considerable.) He also performed twentieth-century music, of which he frequently gave first performances and interpretations. He performed works by Franco Alfano, Virgilio Mortari, Vito Frazzi, Giuseppe Martucci, Gian Francesco Malipiero, Alfredo Casella, Franco Ferrara, Ottorino Respighi, Mario Zafred, Angelo Francesco Lavagnino, Cesare Nordio, Ferruccio Busoni, Antonio Veretti, Ildebrando Pizzetti, Goffredo Petrassi, Mario Peragallo, Luciano Berio, Irma Ravinale, and others.

Off-air recordings include the Mozart Sinfonia Concertante K364 (with Dino Asciolla, conducted by Vittorio Gui, 1963); Mendelssohn Violin concerto (conductor Fulvio Vernizzi, 1958); Stravinsky Violin concerto (conductor Sergiu Celibidache, 1967); Prokofiev 1st Violin concerto (conductor Franco Caracciolo, 1963); Alban Berg Violin concerto (conductor Erich Leinsdorf, 1961). Among his formal recordings are the three Brahms Violin Sonatas with Pier Narciso Masi at the piano (UNICEF - FC UO 06, May 1982). The Chigiano Quintet recorded the quintets of Boccherini, Bloch, Brahms, Schumann, Shostakovich and Dvořák for Decca Records during the early 1950s.

Brengola's tours abroad and the courses at the Chigiana put him in contact with many musicians, including Alfredo Casella, George Enescu, Franco Ferrara, Luciano Berio, Andres Segovia, Pablo Casals, David Oistrakh, Nathan Milstein, Sergio Celibidache, Carlo Maria Giulini, Zubin Mehta and Severino Gazzelloni, with whom he built friendships and musical collaborations.

== Japan ==
In addition to his teaching at the Accademia di Santa Cecilia and the Accademia Chigiana, he taught at the University of Tokyo in Japan in the 1990s. This arose from the mediation and commitment of Shuku Iwasaki, his assistant at the Chigiana, and of Koko Kato, his student and friend. Brengola had contacts with Emperor Akihito and Empress Michiko.

== Honours and tributes ==
In 2003 the Japanese government bestowed him the honor "Ordine del Sol Levante" (The Order of the Rising Sun) to acknowledge his contributions to classical music in Japan.

The title of Commendatore of the Italian Republic was awarded to Brengola by Sandro Pertini, Presidente della Repubblica, in 1982, the honorary citizenship of Siena having been awarded to him in 1980.

In 2017, to mark a century from Brengola's birth, the Accademia Chigiana held a concert in his honor in Siena on 10 July, executed by a Quintet formed by Federico Guglielmo and Felice Cusano on violin, Laura Riccardi on viola, Alain Meunier on cello and Anne Le Bozec on piano.

A recital in homage to Giuliana Brengola Bordoni was given at the church of S Francesco in Sutri (Province of Viterbo, Italy) on 22 June 2019 by students of the S Rosa da Viterbo Lyceum participating in the Sutri Beethoven Festival masterclasses.
