= Mario Lamberto =

Italian conductor

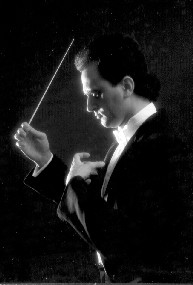
- Born: 22 March 1957 (age 68); Turin, Piedmont, Italy
- Occupation: Conductor

Mario Lamberto (born 22 March 1957) is an Italian conductor.

== Biography ==
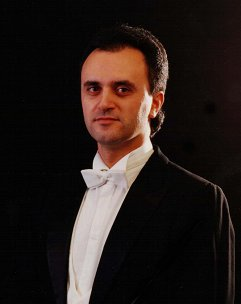
Mario Lamberto in 2006

He graduated in composition, conducting, piano, choral music and choral conducting, with full marks and honours.

Diplomas were obtained as he pursued his studies further with Franco Ferrara, whose conducting post-graduate courses he attended at the Chigi Academy in Siena, at the School of Music at Fiesole and at the "Ente Arena" in Verona.

He also attended a master class given by Vladimir Delman in Parma and a master class given by Aldo Ceccato at the "Scuola di Alto Perfezionamento Professionale" in Saluzzo.

In 1992 he won the "D. Niculescu International Competition" in Braşov (Romania) and came third in the 7th "J. Ferencsik International Competition" organized by the Hungarian Television in Budapest, while he was the only Italian conductor to qualify for the finals in the 1991 "G. Fitelberg" International Competition (Katowice, Poland) and in the 1986 "A. Toscanini" International Competition (Parma, Italy).

He has conducted the RAI National Symphony Orchestra, the Hungarian National Symphony Orchestra, the University of Georgia Festival Orchestra (Atlanta, United States), the Bacau Philharmonie (Romania), the Brasov Philharmonie (Romania), the Jelenia Gora Symphony (Poland), the O.R.T. of Florence, the Haydn Orchestra of Bolzano, the Pomeriggi Musicali of Milan, the Symphony Orchestras of Parma, Sanremo, Ivrea, Bari and Lecce; the Turin Philharmonic Orchestra, the Chamber Orchestras of Padova, Mantova, Turin and other important orchestras in Italy and abroad. He was invited to the Wratislawian Cantans Festival in Wrocław. Operatic repertoire includes Verdi's Rigoletto that he conducted at the Opera House of Bytom and Katowice (Poland). Noteworthy is the first modern production of Niccolò Piccinni's original score of Il mondo della luna performed at the theatre in Bari named after the composer. He has also collaborated with the Teatro Regio (Royal Theatre) in Turin and was assistant conductor at the "Accademia Stefano Tempia" in Turin.

From the season 2009–10 he is Principal Guest Conductor of the Rivoli Symphony Orchestra.

His large repertoire includes operatic, symphonic and choral music and compositions for solo voices, chorus and orchestra, ranging from Baroque to contemporary music.

Very young, in 1978 he was appointed teacher of choral music and choral conducting at the Conservatory "G. Verdi" in Turin, where since 1999 he has been teaching orchestra conducting. Besides, he gives singing and conducting master classes.

== Compositions ==
- Fantasia di Natale

BÈRBEN Music Publishing, of Ancona, Italy, in December 2005 published the FANTASIA DI NATALE for choir and orchestra by Mario Lamberto.

FANTASIA DI NATALE is a shorter version of Christmas Fantasy which was commissioned by the TPO (Turin Philharmonic Orchestra) for the Christmas Concert organized by the Consortium for University Business Studies and the University School for Business Management at Pinerolo (Turin), 18 December 2000.

The Fantasy includes six most famous Christmas songs and carols (Stille Nacht - Silent night – Astro del Ciel // Adeste fideles – O come ye faithful – Venite fedeli // Deck the Halls // Tu scendi dalle stelle // O Tannenbaum // Jingle bells) set in form of theme and variations with a Stretta nel finale. T. T. : ca. 10 minutes.

- Christmas Fantasy

The Christmas Fantasy was commissioned by the TPO (Turin Philharmonic Orchestra) for the Christmas Concert, organized by the Consortium for University Business Studies and the University School for Business Management at Pinerolo (Turin), 18 December 2000.

The Fantasy includes eight most famous Christmas songs and carols (Stille Nacht - Silent night – Astro del Ciel // Adeste fideles – O come ye faithful – Venite fedeli // Deck the Halls // Tu scendi dalle stelle // O Tannenbaum // Jingle bells // Happy Christmas // White Christmas – Bianco Natale) set in form of theme and variations with two Strette nel finale. T. T. : ca. 13 minutes.

The keys of themes follow a cyclical structure touching on all the notes of the diatonic scale (Fa-F; La-A; Do-C; Mi-E; Sol-G; Si-B; Re-D; Fa-F; and Lab-A flat; Do-C; Mib-E flat; Sol-G; Sib–B flat; Reb–D flat; Fa-F; Lab-A flat in the scoring for wind-band).

The composer of the arrangements has set two versions for orchestra : one includes 1 flute, 1 oboe, 1 clarinet, 1 basson and strings; the other one includes 1 flute, 2 oboes, two horns and strings. He also scored versions for Chorus and Orchestra, for Piano and Orchestra, for Soprano and Orchestra. Lastly, he scored an instrumentation for wind-band and versions for Chorus and Piano, for Soprano and Piano, for Boy voice and Piano.

- Waltzes and Polkas by Johann Strauss revised and arranged for Chamber Orchestra by Mario Lamberto

From 1999 to date the TPO (Turin Philharmonic Orchestra) has commissioned the arrangements for small chamber orchestra of Strauss’ waltzes and polkas including the scoring for 1 flute, 1 oboe, 1 clarinet, 1 basson and strings.

The arrangements were wishfully scored to be performed in concerts like the New Year Concert televised worldwide every New Year’s Day from Wien. The scoring is arranged and designed to allow performances in large cities as well as in smaller towns and small concert halls. A comparatively small number of musicians is required, which means a limited expenditure for a striking success (extra performances were often necessary to satisfy all bookings).

Over six years as many as forty-five orchestrations were scored and many others will be scored so to be able to perform a new programme every four years.

== Discography ==
- The Highlights, Turin Philharmonic Orchestra, 1993
- I Concerti ai Santi Martiri, a selection of Symphonic Season 1995
- Valzer di Strauss a Cuneo, Christmas Concert 2002
