= Quintetto Chigiano =

Italian musical ensemble

The Quintetto Chigiano or Chigi Quintet was an Italian musical ensemble comprising a string quartet with pianoforte, founded in 1939 and active until 1966, when it was reformed as the Chigiano String Sextet. Led by Riccardo Brengola, it was first assembled by Count Guido Chigi-Saracini out of his Accademia Musicale Chigiana at Siena in Tuscany, Italy, but developed a worldwide acclaim.

== Personnel ==
The personnel of the Quintet were as follows:

- 1st violin: Riccardo Brengola (leader)
- 2nd violin: Mario Benvenuti - from 1955, Angelo Stefanato - from 1960, Arnaldo Apostoli
- viola: Giovanni Leone
- cello: Lino Filippini
- piano: Sergio Lorenzi

== Formation ==
The Quintetto Chigiano was founded in Siena, Italy, in 1939 and took its name from the Accademia Musicale Chigiana, which was founded by Count Guido Chigi-Saracini. It was one of the rare permanent quintets in the world. The Quintet, which was drawn by Chigi Saracini from among the very talented students of the Academy (who all taught as professors there), had the use of the four best instruments from the Count's private collection, namely a Camillo Camilli and a Guadagnini violin, an Amati viola and a Stradivarius violoncello.

The first violin, Riccardo Brengola, won the Geneva International Music Competition in 1946, and in that year Count Chigi-Saracini appointed him principal of the Chamber Music courses at the Accademia Chigiana, a position which he held until 1997. By 1956, the Quintet had recently given more than a thousand concerts in countries including Italy, Germany, England, France, Holland, Belgium and Spain, had taken part in the major European festivals, and had newly completed a highly successful tour of Central and South America: its repertoire reflected Brengola's preoccupations both with early Italian chamber music and with the works of contemporary composers.

At about this time, the 2nd violin, Mario Benvenuti (1915-1995), (who graduated in violin (1935) and viola (1936) at the Conservatorio di Musica Benedetto Marcello di Venezia, before proceeding to the Accademia Chigiana), left the Quintet to join the Collegium Musicum Italicum (later Virtuosi di Roma) chamber orchestra. In 1962 he became the creator and coordinator of the Città di Vittorio Veneto Violin Competition, and in 1966 re-joined the Chigiano ensemble at the first viola desk when the group was reformed as a string sextet.

Benvenuti was replaced as second violin by Angelo Stefanato. In 1957 the Quintetto Chigiano completed an acclaimed tour of Southern Africa promoted by the musicologist Hans G. Adler. The Chigiano made its Boston debut in 1961 for the Peabody Mason Concert series. Alberto Ginastera dedicated his Piano Quintet op. 29 (1963) to the Chigiano, who gave the first performance at the Teatro La Fenice in that year. In 1964 the Quintet as a body was teaching the course in chamber music at the Accademia Chigiana.

Sergio Lorenzi, a distinguished pianist in his own right, can be heard accompanying the cellist Enrico Mainardi in "live" off-air performances broadcast from Reichssender Berlin in 1942. During the 1960s he made several recordings of pianoforte works for four hands, including the sonatas of Muzio Clementi and works by Ferruccio Busoni, with Gino Gorini. The International Chamber Music Competition "Concorso Sergio Lorenzi" at Trieste is named for him. Giovanni Leone was a very highly esteemed viola player for many years: following a car accident he gave up performing in concerts but continued his work as a teacher.

In 1966, following the death of Count Chigi Saracini, the Quintet was reformed as a string sextet ensemble, the Sestetto Chigiano d'Archi. In addition to Brengola, this consisted of Felice Cusano, later Giovanni Guglielmo (second violin), Mario Benvenuti and Tito Riccardi (violas), and Alain Meunier and Adriano Vendramelli (cellos). The Sextet began touring the United States and Germany in 1967, with the aim of making the public familiar with late 18th century chamber music. Its instruments included violins by Giovanni Battista Guadagnini and one of the Testore family, violas by Nicolò Amati and Pietro Guarneri, and cellos by David Techler and Lorenzo Storioni.

== Recordings ==
The Quintet made several recordings for Decca Records:

- Dvořák, Piano Quintet No. 2 in A major, Op. 81 (released in 1950, Decca LXT2519)
- Franck, Piano Quintet in F minor (1879) (released in June 1950, Decca LXT2520)
- Bloch, Piano Quintet No. 1 in C minor (1923) (released in 1951, Decca LXT2626)
- Brahms, Piano Quintet in F minor, Op. 34 (released in 1952, Decca LXT2687)
- Shostakovich, Piano Quintet in G minor, Op. 57 (released in 1952, Decca LXT2749)
- Boccherini, Piano Quintet in A major, Op. posth. and Quintet in D minor (released in 1954, Decca LXT2841)
- Castelnuovo-Tedesco, Quintet op. 143 for Guitar and String Quartet, Andres Segovia with strings (Brengola; Benvenuti; Leone; Filippini) of the Chigiano Quintet (released in 1956, Decca 9832)

== Sources ==
- E. Sackville-West and D. Shawe-Taylor, The Record Year 2 (Collins, London 1953).
- E.M.G., The Art of Record-Buying 1960 (London 1960).
- E.M.G., The Monthly Newsletter (London)
- Ephemera: Printed flyer for Royal Festival Hall concert of Boccherini, Brahms and Dvořák. (early 1950s).
