= Accademia Musicale Chigiana =

Italian music institute

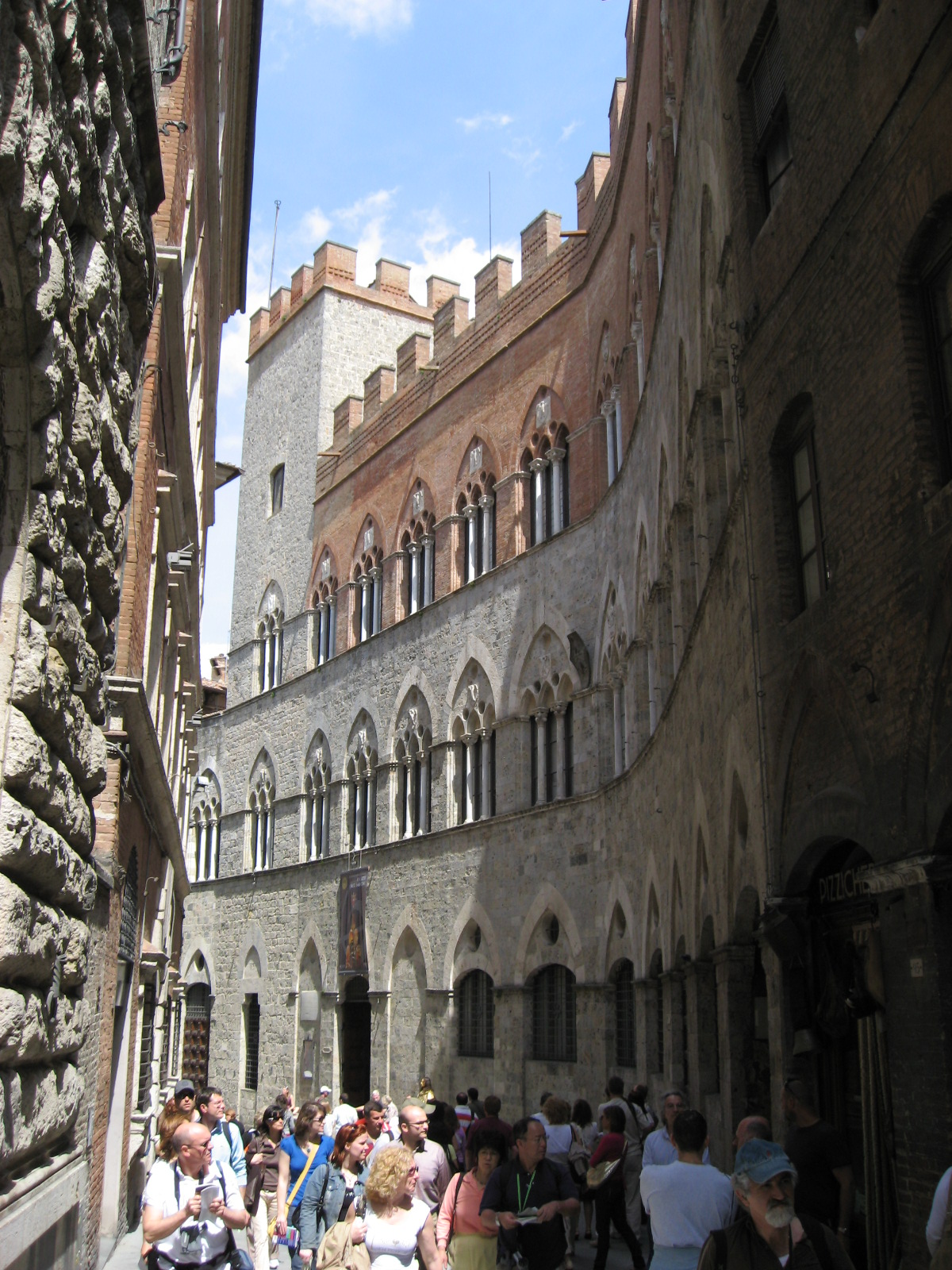
Palazzo Chigi Saracini, the Accademia Musicale Chigiana Building

The Accademia Musicale Chigiana (English: Chigiana Musical Academy) is a music institute in Siena, Italy. It was founded by Count Guido Chigi-Saracini in 1932 as an international centre for advanced musical studies. It organises Master Classes in the major musical instruments as well as singing, conducting and composition. During the summer months a series of concerts are held under the title of Estate Musicale Chigiana.

Amongst the teachers at the academy in the 1950s were Clotilde von Derp and Alexander Sakharoff who stopped their international touring to teach here at the invitation of the Count.

In 1983 the Accademia Musicale Chigiana, Fulvia Casella Nicolodi and Guido Turchi created an International Composition Competition named after Alfredo Casella, for the one hundredth anniversary of his birth. The International Accademia Musicale Chigiana Prize has been assigned, and among the winners' names are some of the most famous ones in international concert circles. These names join the history of the Accademia Chigiana, already studded with presences.

The Quintetto Chigiano took its name from this Academy: its leader, Riccardo Brengola, was Professor Emeritus at the Accademia for 64 years.

The Academy occupies the 14th-century Palazzo Chigi-Saracini and contains an important library of musical and literary works of over 70,000 volumes as well as The Chigi Saracini Art Collection and The Musical Instrument Museum.

== Notable alumni ==
- Claudio Abbado
- Salvatore Accardo
- Daniel Barenboim
- David J. Buch
- Roberto Carnevale
- Gérard Caron
- Gaspar Cassadó
- Aldo Ceccato
- Riccardo Chailly
- Jorge Chaminé
- Keith Clark
- Donald Covert
- Alirio Diaz
- Marcin Dylla
- Ciarán Farrell
- Ádám Fischer
- Ivan Fischer
- Sona Ghazarian
- Carlo Maria Giulini
- Achim Holub
- Gwyneth Jones
- Sylvia Kersenbaum
- Mario Lamberto
- Gilbert Levine
- Zubin Mehta
- Marco Misciagna
- Domenico Nordio
- Daniel Oren
- Eberhard Schoener
- Giuseppe Sinopoli
- Uto Ughi
- Saša Večtomov
- Roman Vlad
- John Williams
- Ivan Yanakov (pianist)
- Franco Venturini (musician)

== Accademia Musicale Chigiana International Prize laureates ==
Accademia Musicale Chigiana International Prize laureates include:

- Gidon Kremer, violin (1982)
- Peter Serkin, piano (1983)
- Shlomo Mintz, violin (1984)
- Krystian Zimerman, piano (1985)
- Anne-Sophie Mutter, violin (1986)
- Andras Schiff, piano (1987)
- Viktoria Mullova, violin (1988)
- Andrei Gavrilov, piano (1989)
- Frank Peter Zimmermann, violin (1990)
- Evgeny Kissin, piano (1991)
- Gil Shaham, violin (1992)
- Esa-Pekka Salonen, conductor (1993)
- Maxim Vengerov, violin (1995)
- Hagen Quartet, string quartet (1996)
- Tabea Zimmermann, viola (1997)
- Lilya Zilberstein, piano (1998)
- Matt Haimovitz, cello (1999)
- Julian Rachlin, violin (2000)
- Leif Ove Andsnes, piano (2001)
- Hilary Hahn, violin (2002)
- Arcadi Volodos, piano (2003)
- Artemis Quartet, string quartet (2004)
- Sarah Chang, violin (2005)
- Paul Lewis, piano (2006)
- Lisa Batiashvili, violin (2009)
- Rafał Blechacz, piano (2010)

== See also ==
- List of music museums
