= Pancole, San Gimignano =

Pancole
- Frazione
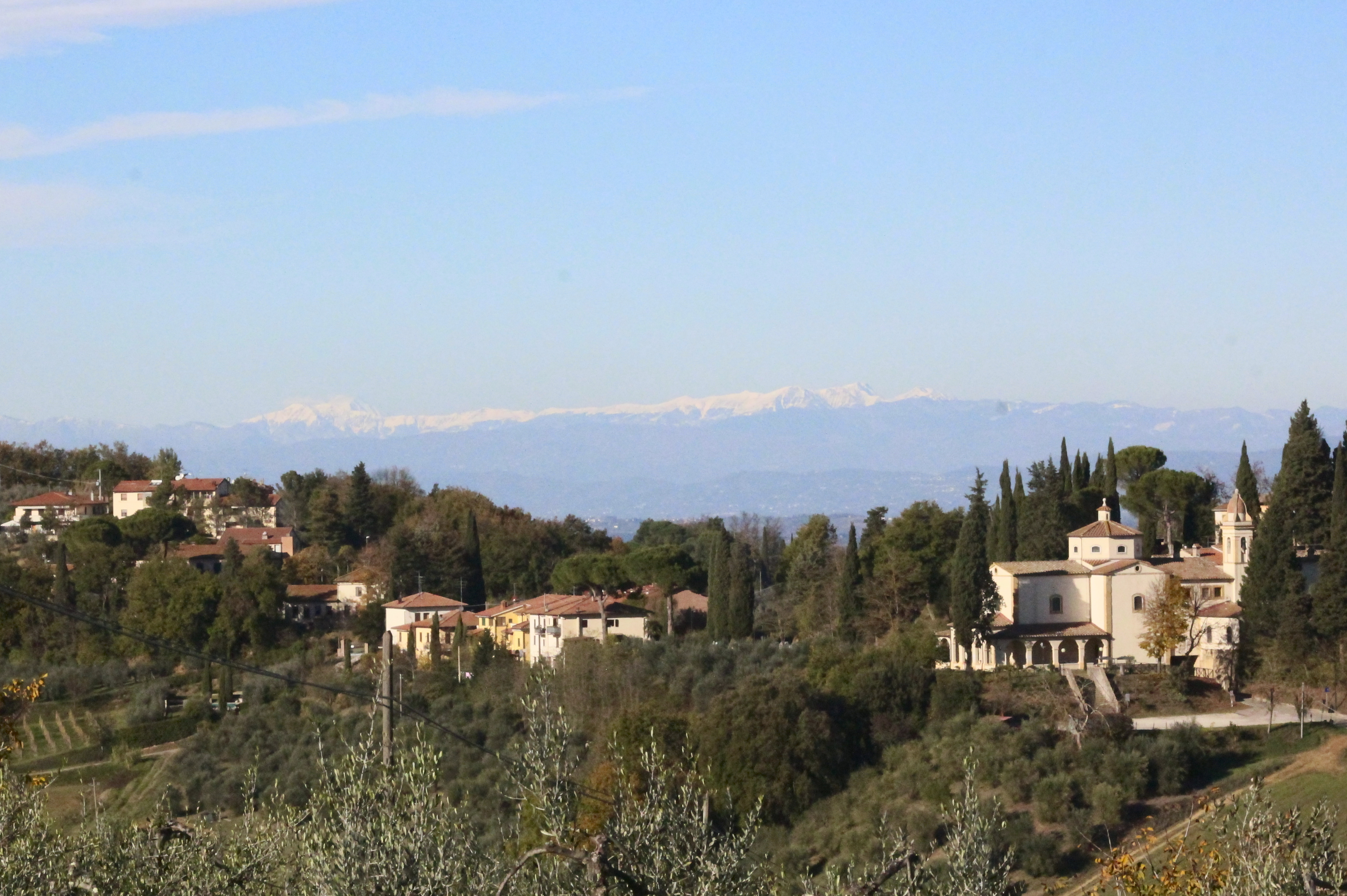
- View of Pancole

- Location of Pancole in Italy
- Coordinates: 43°30′3″N 11°00′22″E
- Country: Italy
- Region: Tuscany
- Province: Siena (SI)
- Comune: San Gimignano
- Elevation: 272 m (892 ft)

Population (2011)
  - Total: 115
- Demonym: Pancolesi
- Time zone: UTC+1 (CET)
  - Summer (DST): UTC+2 (CEST)

Pancole is a village in Tuscany, central Italy, administratively a frazione of the comune of San Gimignano, province of Siena. At the time of the 2001 census its population was 105.

Pancole is about 50 km from Siena and 6 km from San Gimignano.

== Mains sights ==
- Sanctuary of Maria Santissima Madre della Divina Provvidenza
- Santa Maria Assunta in Cellole
- Castle of Collemucioli
