= Bruno Canino =

Italian pianist and composer

Bruno Canino (born 30 December 1935) is an Italian classical pianist, harpsichordist and composer.

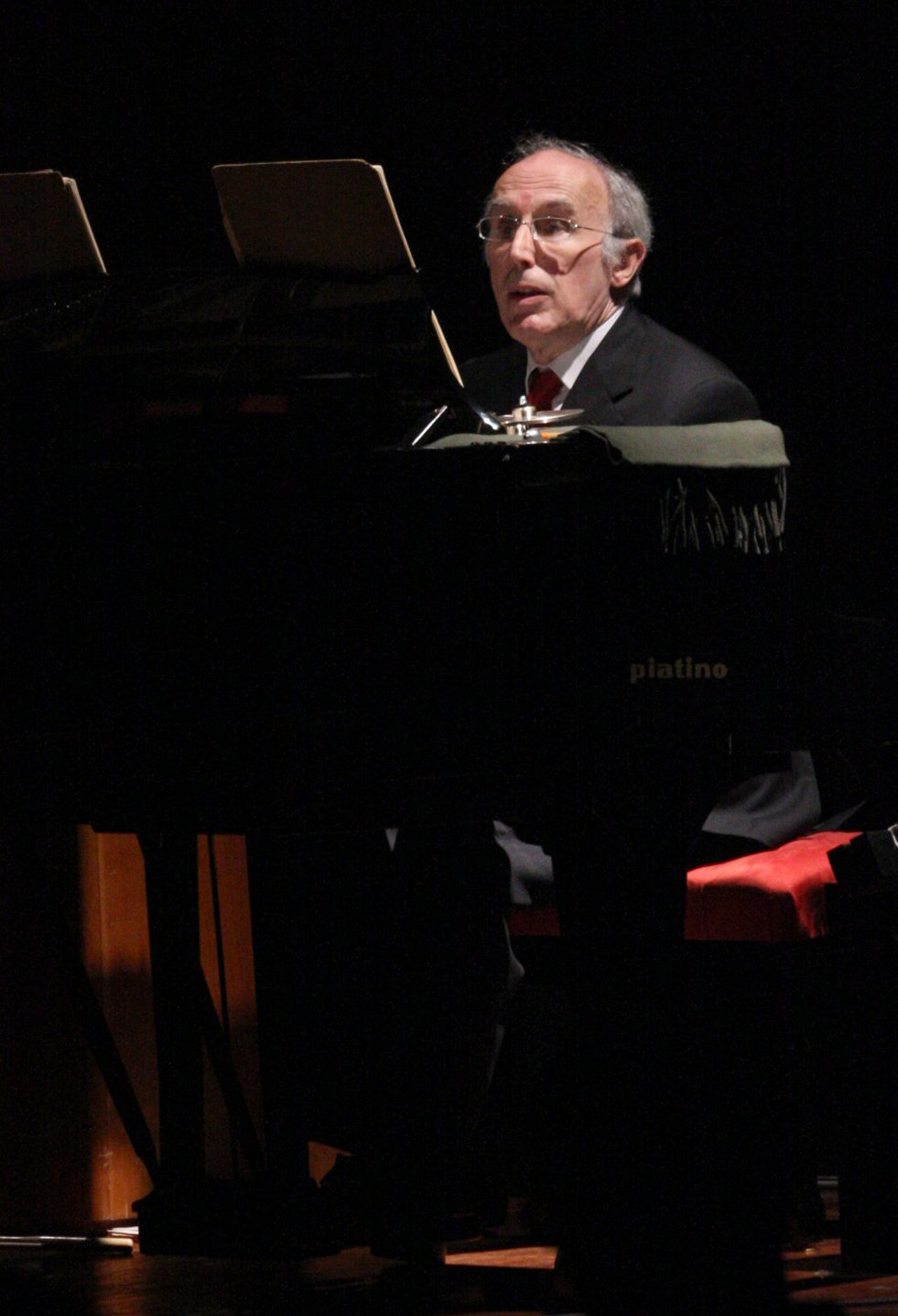
Bruno Canino in 2008

== Early life ==
Bruno Canino was born in Naples, Italy in 1935, where he studied piano with Vincenzo Vitale. He continued his musical education in Milan, studying both piano and composition. His teachers included Enzo Calace and Bruno Bettinelli. In 1956 and again in 1958, he won prizes at the Ferruccio Busoni International Piano Competition and in 1960 at the Darmstadt competition.

== Career ==
Canino has an international reputation as a soloist, chamber musician, and accompanist. Among those with whom he has appeared are the violinists Itzhak Perlman, Salvatore Accardo, Franco Mezzena, Viktoria Mullova, Pierre Amoyal, Oleksandr Semchuk, Uto Ughi, Ksenia Milas, Alessio Bidoli the flutists Severino Gazzelloni, Luisa Sello, Roberto Pasquini, the cellist Lynn Harrell and vocalist Cathy Berberian. He is also the pianist of the celebrated Trio di Milano, together with the violinist Mariana Sîrbu and cellist Rocco Filippini.

He is an enthusiastic advocate of contemporary music. Among the composers who have dedicated works to him are Luciano Berio, Mauricio Kagel, Wolfgang Rihm and Iannis Xenakis. He has also composed a number of solo and chamber works for piano.

From 1999 to 2002, he was music director of the Biennale di Venezia and from 1986 to 1995, artistic director of Giovine Orchestra Genovese.

In 1997, he wrote the book Vademecum of the Chamber Pianist.

== Appearances as an Accompanist ==
On 22 September 2020, Canino accompanied flautist Roberto Pasquini in Beethoven's Violin Sonata No.9, Op.47 'Kreutzer'.

In 2019, he accompanied flautist Luisa Sello.

In 2018, Canino accompanied violinist Elisso Gogibedaschwili in Grieg's Sonata 1st movement in do minore op.45. In the same year, he accompanied Sandrine Cantoreggi in Saint-Saëns Introduction and Rondo Capriccioso.

In 2017, Canino accompanied violinist Katharina Uhde in Beethoven's Sonata Op. 12 No. 3, Rondo. Allegro molto.

== Recordings ==
Among Canino's notable recordings are the Bach Goldberg Variations, the complete piano works of Casella and the first recording on compact disc of the complete piano works of Debussy. His duo recital with Viktoria Mullova of works by Prokofiev, Ravel, and Stravinsky was awarded the Edison Award. In 1980, he recorded piano rarities by Rossini and Donizetti on a Bösendorfer Imperial Grand for the Japanese Camerata label. He also recorded with the violinist Salvatore Accardo the complete sonatas for violin and piano of Mozart.

== See also ==
- Giovine Orchestra Genovese
