= Musafia =

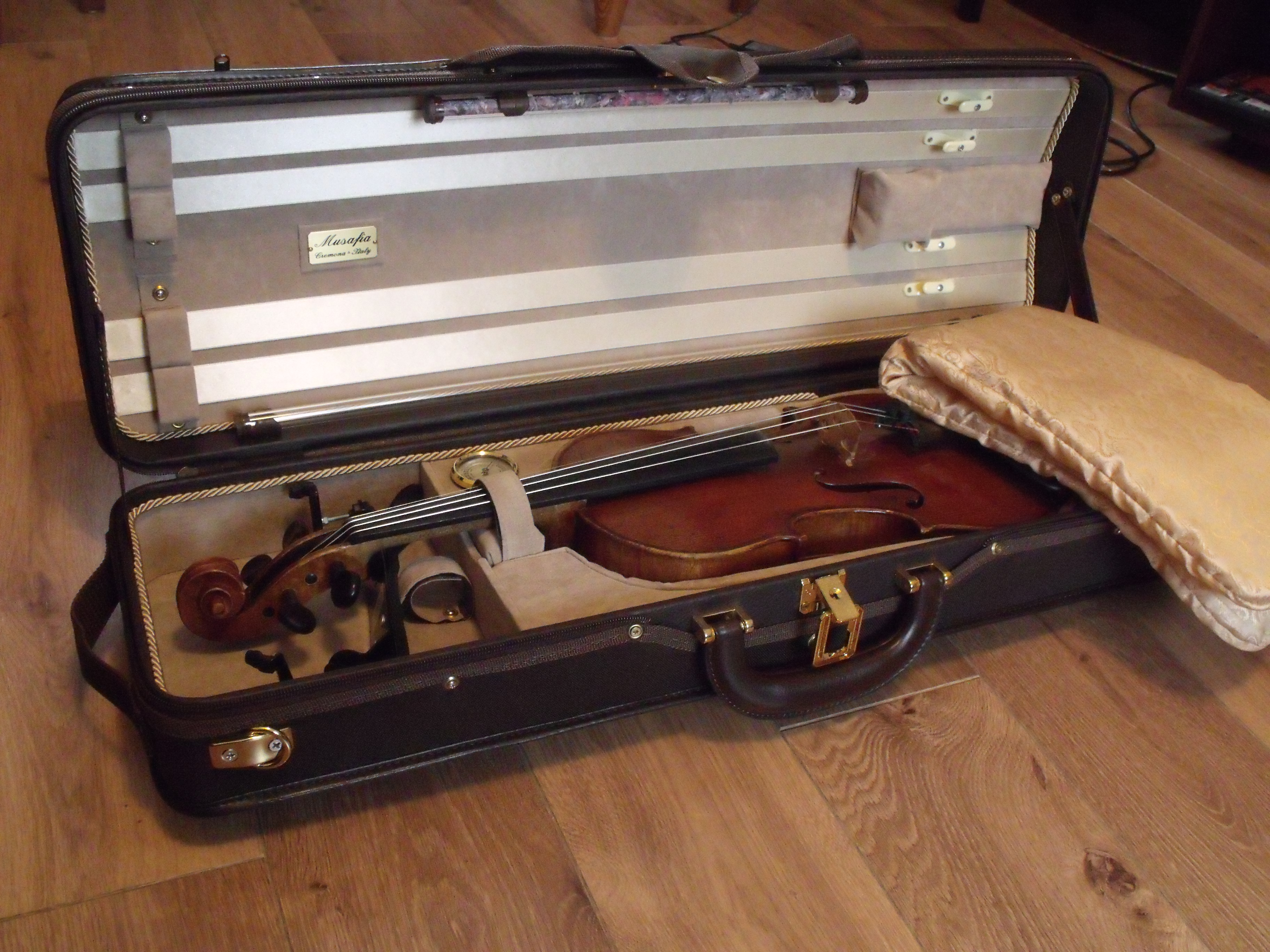
A Musafia Momentum with Terra Brown exterior and Ivory interior - shown with optional Pillow blanket upgrade

Musafia is an Italian manufacturer of violin cases. They specialise in high-end violin cases, which are handmade at their workshop in Cremona, Italy. Their cases are internationally renowned and are used by many leading soloists including Sarah Chang, Joshua Bell, Salvatore Accardo, Anne-Sophie Mutter, Isaac Stern, Uto Ughi, and Chloë Hanslip.

== History ==
The company was founded in 1983 by violinist and luthier Dimitri Musafia, who studied violin making at the Stradivari Institute. Musafia's objective was to create a violin case which focused primarily on instrument safety and aesthetics. After experimenting with variety of different materials over several years, a "specially-milled wood laminate" emerged as the preferred choice for the basis of construction, satisfying the requirements for both instrument safety and portability. Since then, Musafia cases have been the preferred choice for some of the most famous and expensive violins in the world, including Guarneris and the 1715 Stradivarius "Cremonese", previously played by Joseph Joachim. The construction specifics have changed over the years to ensure that their high standards are upheld. Up to this day, Musafia has remained a family-owned business, with all aspects of design and construction taking place in the company's Cremona workshop and overseen by Dmitri personally.

== Build ==
The cases are manufactured from a high quality laminate shell and a four-point instrument suspension system is standard on all cases. Other important safety features include locking bow spinners, a hygrometer and a humidifier.

Second to safety, aesthetic appeal and convenience are very important in the construction of Musafia cases. The vast majority of cases are equipped with the standard features such as a screw-attached teflon-treated cordura nylon cover (with an exterior music pocket), backpack provisions, a subway handle, a string tube and a large leather/leatherette handle. All the fittings and materials used in the construction of the case are of the highest quality.

As well as violin cases, Musafia also build viola cases and double cases (cases for two violins, two violas or violin and viola).

== Current models ==
As of October 2019, the current models in production are:

- Lievissima EVOLUTION
- Momentum
- Momentum Z
- Superleggero Royale
- Luxury Model (series 3)
- Aeternum (series 5)
- Master Series
- Engima (series 3)

== Options and accessories ==
Musafia has a wide range of accessories and options which can be added to any case. Some options come as standard on some models and others are subject to an additional fee. As of October 2019, available options are:

=== Safety options ===
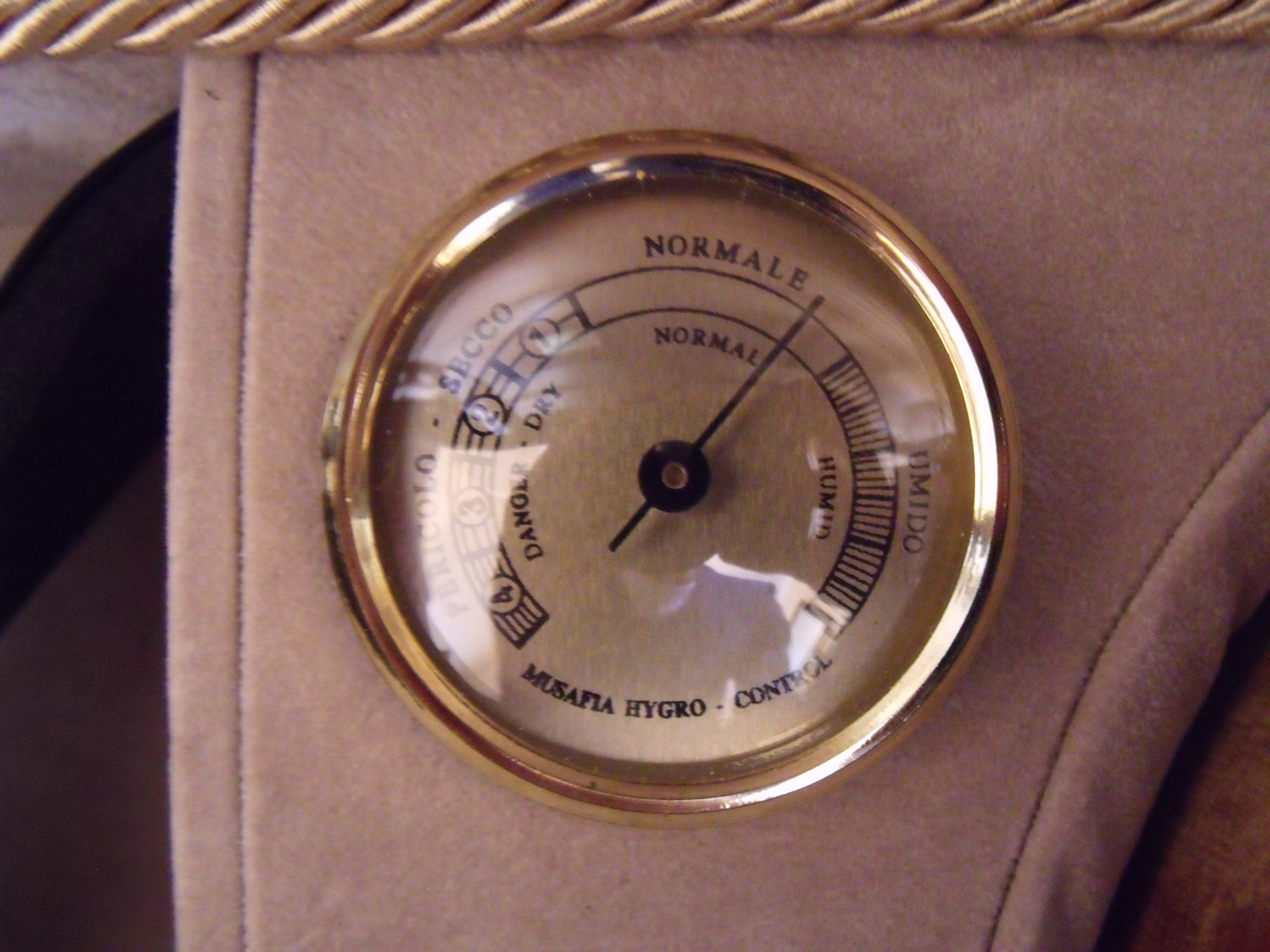
The Musafia hygrometer

- Protecta System - increases load-bearing capability to 200 kg
- Additional frame reinforcement - increases resistance to lateral impact
- Tropicalization - reduces internal temperature excursion by up to 60% in hot weather and 30% in cold weather
- Waterproofing - maximum water resistance
- WeatherGuard - enhanced seal
- PressurePorts - released excess pressure in humid conditions to stabilize humidity levels
- SuperSilk - hygroscopic silk velvet enhances the stability of the micro-climate within the case
- Hygrometer - standard on all models
- Thermometer
- DIMUS II humidifier - standard on all models
- Bow tip cushions - protect bow tips on impact

=== Style options ===
- Swarovski crystals - can be added to cover the screws of the bow spinners
- Leather instrument restraints - replaces standard Velcro
- Shadow design - darker, brushed effect on all metallic fittings
- Gold-laminated fittings - to prevent rust and corrosion, standard on all models
- Black velvet interior
- Alcantra shell lining - suede-like material replaces standard leather, reducing case weight
- Leather case cover - replaces standard Teflon-treated Cordura nylon
- Cherrywood burl trim
- Personalized nameplate

=== Utility options ===
- Enlarged music pouch - carries about 100% more music than the standard music pouch
- Hidden documents pocket
- String tube - standard on all models
- Interior illumination - LED micro-beams illuminate the main accessory compartments
- Electronic tuner - A440

=== Accessories ===
- CaseCaddy(TM) - small pouch matching style of case
- Pillow blanket - satin blanket providing additional protection
- Padded carrying straps - to ease the weight of the case
