= Semeria =

Semeria may refer to:

- Semeria River (or Benedec River), a tributary of the Olt River in Romania
- Giovanni Semeria (1867–1931), Italian orator-preacher and author
