= Franco Mezzena =

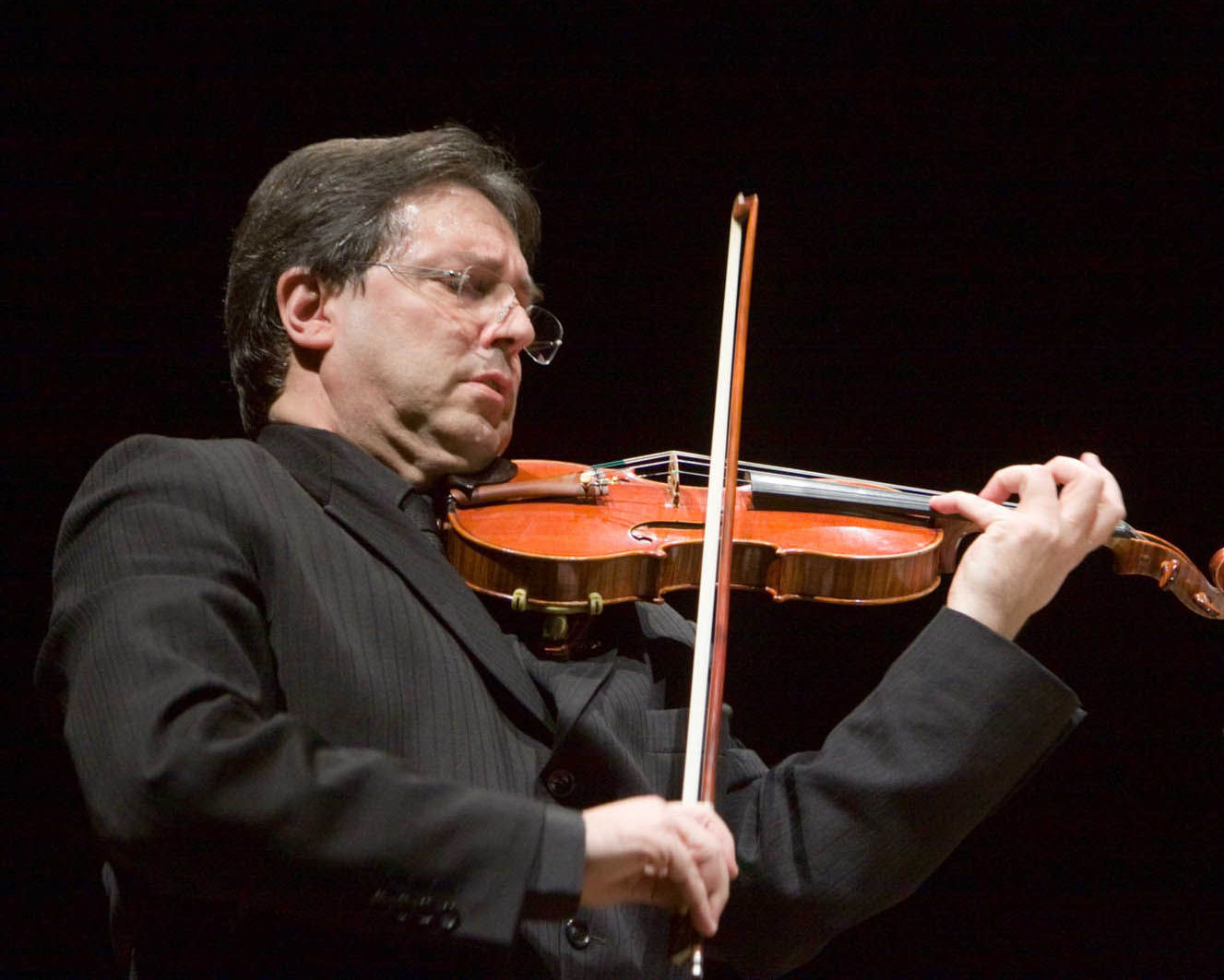
Franco Mezzena

Franco Mezzena born 4 November 1953 in Trento, northern Italy, is an Italian violin virtuoso. He studied ten years with Salvatore Accardo.

== Activities ==
- Guest soloist at concert halls and festivals in Europe, Japan, Africa, Martinique, South America, U.S.A and Mexico.
- Played Mendelssohn Op.64 at Carnegie Hall in New York.
- Toured with "I Musici" and "I Virtuosi di Roma".
- Performed with Salvatore Accardo, Bruno Battisti D'Amario, Julius Berger, Bruno Canino, Roberto Fabbriciani, Rocco Filippini, Severino Gazzelloni, Stefano Giavazzi, Bruno Giuranna, Johannes Goritzki, Jacques Klein, Alain Meunier, Bruno Mezzena, Andrea Noferini, Alberto Nones, Antony Pay, Franco Petracchi, Claudio Piastra, Ruggiero Ricci, Eros Roselli, Massimo Scattolin, Hariolf Schlichtig, Rohan de Saram.
- Concerts for RAI Radiotelevisione Italiana, Radio Vaticana, BBC, ABC, NBC, WSKG, WGBH Boston, NHK Television Japan, KBS Corea, etc.
- Gives Master Classes in Italy (Conservatory of Mantua, Messina and Perugia, S. Antioco-Sardinia, "Musica Riva Festival", Alghero-Sardinia, Naples and abroad (Royal College and Trinity College-London, Hertford College-Oxford, Chetham's School of Music-Manchester, Conservatory of Rotterdam, Académié d'été d'Andé, Tokyo, Osaka, Kyushu, Sapporo, Barcelona, Ticino Musica Festival-Switzerland, University of Mexico City etc.). He teaches at "Accademia Ensemble Serenissima" in Sacile - Italy and at "Accademia Teatro Annibale di Francia" for Orchestra da Camera di Messina in Messina - Italy.

== Recordings ==
- He recorded 100 CD for Dynamic (record label), Odradek Records, Brilliant Classics, Newton Classics, Luna Rossa Classic, Wide Classique, Symposium, Rivo Alto, Ricordi, Nuova Era, E.M.S. Arcobaleno.
- Recorded for Dynamic the 29 concertos for violin and orchestra by Giovanni Battista Viotti (world premiere recording - 10 CDs), where he appears as soloist and conductor of the "Symphonia Perusina" and the Chamber Orchestra “Milano Classica”.
- Recorded for Luna Rossa Records label the complete Sonatas for violin and piano by Johannes Brahms with the pianist Alberto Nones.
- Recorded for Wide Classique label the complete works for violin and piano by Ludwig van Beethoven with the pianist Stefano Giavazzi (4 CDs).
- Recorded for Wide Classique label the complete works for violin and guitar by Mauro Giuliani with the guitarist Umberto Cafagna (Vol.1).
- Recorded for Luna Rossa Records label the complete works for violin and guitar by Mauro Giuliani with the guitarist Umberto Cafagna (world premiere recording) (Vol.2).
- Recorded for Brilliant Classics the complete string quartets by Giovanni Battista Viotti with Quartetto Viotti (world premiere recording - 4 CDs).
- Recorded for Brilliant Classics the complete piano trios by Ermanno Wolf-Ferrari with Trio Mezzena-Patria-Ballario (world premiere recording).
- Recorded for Dynamic the works for violin and piano by Germaine Tailleferre with the pianist Bruno Mezzena.
- Recorded for Odradek Records the Piano Trios by Franz Schubert with Mezzena-Patria-Ballario Piano Trio.
- Recorded for Odradek Records the Violin Sonatas by César Franck, Claude Debussy and the Four Pieces Op. 25 by Florent Schmitt with Elena Ballario.
- Recorded for Odradek Records "Brahms the Progressive" Satzfragment by Arnold Schoenberg, Sonatas Op. 100 and Op. 108 by Johannes Brahms, Phantasy Op.47 by Arnold Schoenberg and Vier Stucke Op.7 by Anton Webern with the pianist Pina Napolitano.

== Conducting ==
- Has conducted the Lublijana Symphony Orchestra, the Pescara Symphony Orchestra, the “Teatro Regio of Turin” Symphony Orchestra, the “Milano Classica” Chamber Orchestra, the “Interpreti Italiani” Chamber Orchestra, the Jalisco Philharmonic Orchestra etc.

== Positions ==
- Teacher at AIMART in Rome.
- Teacher at Accademia Ensemble Serenissima in Sacile.
- Teacher at Accademia Teatro Annibale di Francia in Messina.
- Soloist and conductor of the Orchestra da Camera di Lecce e del Salento and member of the Jury of Italian EUYO (European Union Youth Orchestra) Auditions (2005-2010).
- He is Artistic Director for Orchestra da Camera di Lecce e del Salento.
- Artistic Director of Luna Rossa Classic label.

== Other ==
- Interviewed on The Strad, Fanfare Magazine, American Record Guide, New York Times, Gramophone, Diapason, FonoForum, MUSICA etc.
- He plays a 1695 Stradivarius, an instrument by Roberto Regazzi (Bologna, 1998), two instruments by Giovanni Osvaldo Fiori (Treviso, 1989-2020) and one instrument made by Fabio Nicotra (Palermo, 2022).
