= Alessandro Marangoni =

Italian pianist

Alessandro Marangoni (born 1979) is an Italian classical pianist.

He studied piano with Marco Vincenzi, and, after a diploma summa cum laude, continued his studies at the Scuola di Musica di Fiesole with Maria Tipo. He also studied philosophy, graduating from the Università di Pavia with honors with a thesis about Fernando Liuzzi's philosophy of music.

Marangoni has won a number of awards, both in his native Italy and abroad, including, in 2007, the prestigious Amici di Milano International Prize for Music. He has performed in many European countries, and in the United States, as a soloist and as a member of chamber groups. He has worked with many of Italy's leading musicians, including Mario Ancillotti, Aldo Ceccato, Valentina Cortese, Quirino Principe, the Nuovo Quartetto Italiano and Carlo Zardo. Marangoni has also performed more than one hundred concerts on Second Life, under his avatar Benito Flores.

He has recorded music by composers such as Rossini, Muzio Clementi, and Liszt, for the Naxos record label.

Marangoni teaches piano and chamber music in master classes in Europe and South America.
