= Giavazzi =

Giavazzi is an Italian surname. Notable people with the surname include:

- Francesco Giavazzi (born 1949), Italian economist
- Giovanni Giavazzi (1920–2019), Italian politician
- Stefano Giavazzi (born 1963), Italian pianist
