= Rondaninn-a Teito a Teito =

Song
- Language: Genoese
- English title: "Roof to roof on Rondanina"
- Genre: Folk

Rondaninn-a teito a teito is a traditional song from the Italian Liguria region (where the city of Rondanina lies):.

As usual, in traditional music there exist several versions with small variations. One of the common lyrics is

Genoese dialect lyric

Rondaninn-a, teito a teito,
pòrta l’euio a San Beneito.
San Beneito o no ne veu,
pòrta l’euio a San Grigheu.
San Grigheu o no ne veu manco,
pòrta l’euio a-o Spirito Santo.

Spirito Santo, lê o s’o piggia
e o s’o mette inta botiggia.
Quello pöco ch’o gh’avansa
o s’o mette inta seu lampa.
Lampa, lampetta,
o Bambin inta chinetta,
a Madònna in zenogion / in procescion,
oh, che bella oraçion!

Quande messa van a dâ / Quande a messa a va a l'artâ),
tutti i angei a cantâ.
Quande messa a l’é finia,
tutti i angei in compagnia.
Quande seunna o sunagin / o campanin,
tutti i angei into giardin
a recheugge reuze e fiori
pe goernî Gexù Bambin.

Italian translation

Rondinella, di tetto in tetto,
porta l'olio a San Benedetto.
San Benedetto non ne vuole
porta l’olio alle sue figliole.
Le sue figliole ne voglion tanto
porta l’olio allo Spirito Santo.
Lo Spirito Santo se l’è pigliato
in una bottiglia l’ha versato
e se ne avanza un gocciolino
se lo mette nel lumino.
Lampada, lampadetta
il bambino nella chiesetta,
la Madonna in processione
oh che bella combinazione!

English translation

Swallow (flies) from roof to roof
carries oil to San Benito
San Benito does not want
carries oil to San Gregorio
San Gregorio does not need
carries oil to Holy Spirit
The Holy Spirit catches it
and puts it in a bottle
if some oil is left
he puts it in the lamp
lamp little lamp
The child in the cradle
Mary kneeling down
Oh what a lovely prayer.

As a result of significant Italian (particularly from Genoa) immigration to Argentina in the late 19th and early 20th century it is well known in the xeneize (Genoese) community.

== See also ==
- Music of Genoa
- San Beneito article
