= Dynamic (record label) =

Italian independent record label

Dynamic S.r.l.
- Parent company: Naxos
- Founded: 1978
- Founder: Pietro Mosetti Casaretto
- Genre: opera and classical music
- Country of origin: Italy
- Location: Genoa
- Official website: www.dynamic.it

Dynamic is an Italian independent record label located in Genoa. Founded in 1978, it specialises in classical music and opera, especially rarely performed works and has produced several world premiere recordings. The Dynamic catalogue contains over 400 titles, with about 25 new titles added each year and is distributed in 32 countries.

== History ==
Dynamic was founded in 1978 by Pietro Mosetti Casaretto and his wife Marisa. Mosetti Casaretto, a surgeon and amateur violinist, took over a small label founded by the musicologist Edward Neill. In the beginning, Dynamic was a small family business. Mosetti Casaretto and his wife recorded in local churches, oratories and villas. The first recordings were issued on vinyl, the first being Paganini's Barucabà Variations played by Salvatore Accardo.

In 1985 the company moved to its current site in the Villa Quartana on the Righi hill overlooking Genoa, where it set up a recording hall that could house a small chamber orchestra. In the late 1990s Mosetti Casaretto retired, and management of the label was taken over by his son-in-law, Alberto Dellepiane. Over the years, the label's focus on chamber music and particularly violin music has widened to include full-length opera recordings on both CD and DVD. More recently, Dynamic has become a high definition content producer for television and cinema. Naxos acquired Dynamic in 2014.

== Notable recordings ==
Dynamic has recorded on DVD several live opera performances at La Fenice — Il crociato in Egitto, Le roi de Lahore, Maometto secondo, Thaïs, Pia de' Tolomei, Didone, Death in Venice, Les pêcheurs de perles, and Baldassare Galuppi's rarely performed L'Olimpiade. For the Rossini Opera Festival in Pesaro, they have recorded on DVD L'equivoco stravagante, Ermione, La gazza ladra, Torvaldo e Dorliska, Bianca e Falliero, L'italiana in Algeri, and on CD La cambiale di matrimonio and Il turco in Italia. Dynamic's other recordings include:

- Paganini: Works for Violin and Orchestra, First Complete Edition, Salvatore Accardo, Yehudi Menuhin, Franco Mezzena, Massimo Quarta, Ruggiero Ricci (Dynamic CD5622)
- Leonardo Leo: Alidoro. La Cappella della Pietà de Turchini, conducted by Antonio Florio. DVD of the live performance at the Teatro Valli in Reggio Emilia, world premiere recording and winner of the Orphée d'Or from the Académie Lyrique Française
- Viotti: The 29 Violin Concertos, Franco Mezzena violinist and conductor (Dynamic CDS498)
- Mozart: Idomeneo, re di Creta. Slovak Chamber Choir and the Orchestra Internazionale d'Italia conducted by Corrado Rovaris at the Festival della Valle d'Itria, world premiere recording of the score revision by Richard Strauss (Dynamic CDS 532)
- Gomes: Salvator Rosa. Bratislava Chamber Chorus and Orchestra Internazionale d'Italia, conducted by Maurizio Benini at the Festival della Valle d'Itria, world premiere recording (Dynamic CDS 47211-2)
- Rossini: Demetrio e Polibio. Sluk Chamber Choir of Bratislava and Graz Symphony Orchestra conducted by Massimiliano Carraro in a live recording from the Festival della Valle d'Itria (Dynamic CDS 171).
