= Giovine Orchestra Genovese =

- Industry: Nonprofit music organization
- Founded: January 12, 1912; 114 years ago, in Genoa, Italy
- Founder: Giovanni Semeria
- Headquarters: Genoa, Italy
- Key people: Beatrice Costa Horszowski (Honorary President); Nicola Costa (President); Pietro Borgonovo (Artistic Director)
- Services: Classical and chamber music concerts; Musical formation; Cultural activities
- Website: www.gog.it

Giovine Orchestra Genovese (also known as GOG) is an Italian music organization, concert society and cultural association, founded in 1912 in Genoa by Giovanni Semeria. A nonprofit organization, it organizes and produces classical and chamber music concerts and promotes musical education for students.

The current President is Nicola Costa while Pietro Borgonovo leads the artistic direction.

Nowadays, Giovine Orchestra Genovese concert seasons are some of the most attended in Italy, with almost 1.000 subscribers and an average attendance of 40.000 customers per year.

== History ==
"Scholars and music lovers! We want to give Genoa, our beloved city whose beauty expression is inferior to no other one, a permanent orchestra being the center of a new and powerful movement of aesthetic education."

—Extract from the founding announcement of Giovine Orchestra Genovese

Among the oldest concert societies in Italy, Giovine Orchestra Genovese was founded in 1912 in Genoa by Giovanni Semeria, a priest, writer and public speaker, one of the greatest Italian catholic personalities of the 20th century.
The origin of Giovine Orchestra Genovese is linked to the birth and the increase of concert societies and musical associations in Italy. By the end of the 19th century symphonic and chamber music, previously ignored or underperformed there, partly due to Opera long-time domination, saw a considerable audience boost. During these years Genoa, one of the most industrialized cities in Italy, refined its cultural citylife. The main location of musical performances was the Teatro Carlo Felice, built in 1824, but a city permanent orchestra had yet to be founded.

The actual purpose of Giovanni Semeria and the composer Mario Barbieri, Giuseppe Martucci's pupil, was to create a permanent orchestra and a musical society at the same time. That was to be formed both by professional players and "active members", the latter being culture high-profile personalities, chamber music lovers and concert regular attenders who would gave their financial support, in spite of directly joining the orchestra.

The original statute established Giovine Orchestra Genovese as a "musical culture association" and set up its purpose: "playing instrumental music and promoting or encouraging every valid project being able to spread musical culture". Arturo Toscanini became the Honorary President in 1921.

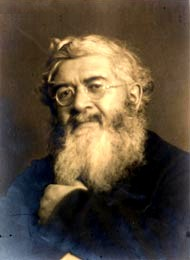
Giovanni Semeria, the founder of Giovine Orchestra Genovese.

During the 1920s the association hosted many internationally renowned artists such as Mieczyslaw Horszowski, Wilhelm Backhaus, Vladimir Horowitz, Walter Gieseking, Nathan Milstein and Francis Poulenc, progressively turning into a society specialised in producing and organizing concerts rather than a proper orchestra with its own players. The orchestra itself would ultimately break off after World War II.

Concert programs in the 30s grew up both musically and artistically, thus beginning to offer some richer repertoires played by even more prestigious performers. However, Italy's entrance into World War II caused a serious decrease of these activities: frequent allied bombings on Genoa led the association to transfer its events to Rapallo until 1944, before completely stopping them all.

Giovine Orchestra Genovese was successfully revived by Arturo Benedetti Michelangeli's piano recital in 1945 and quickly became one of the most recognized international music societies. Yehudi Menuhin, Andrés Segovia, Mstislav Rostropovich, Dinu Lipatti, Sviatoslav Richter and Benjamin Britten were only some of the "big" performers playing in Genoa during the post War period.

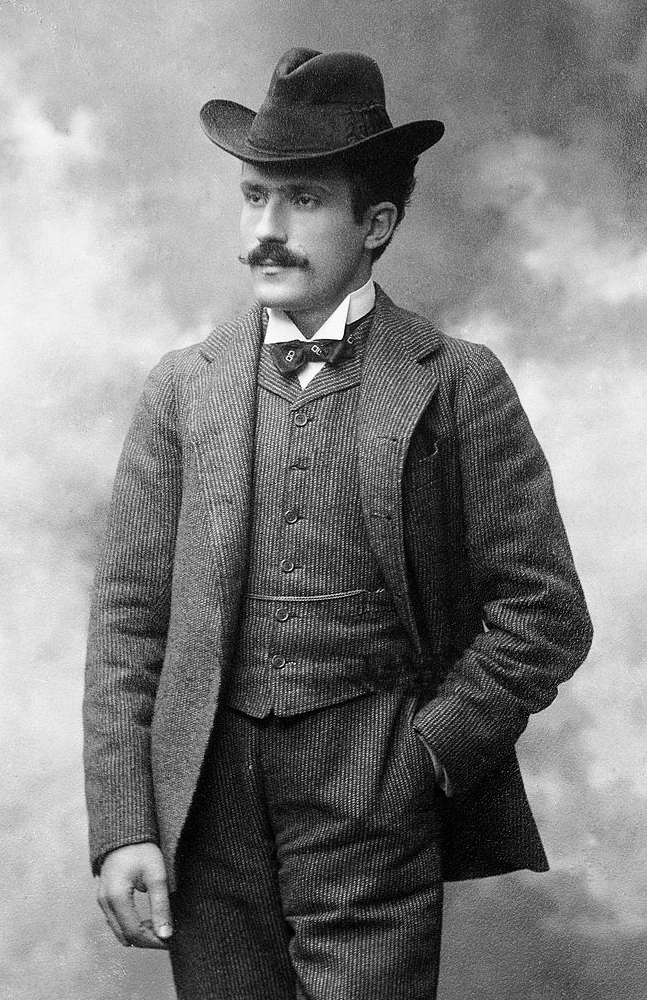
Italian conductor Arturo Toscanini became the Honorary President of Giovine Orchestra Genovese in 1921.

One of the great contributions of the association has been the "talent scouting" of new talented artists, many of whom had previously won several international competitions: Maurizio Pollini, Martha Argerich, Uto Ughi, Salvatore Accardo and many others. Still today, the association continues to give hospitality to the winners of the major music competitions, especially from the International Chopin Piano Competition and the International Tchaikovsky Competition: Grigory Sokolov, Vladimir Ashkenazy, Viktoria Mullova, Krystian Zimerman and many other globally renowned musicians.

Starting from the 1960s, Giovine Orchestra Genovese has begun to explore specific themes, sounds and concepts, as well as new composers' repertoires, resulting in peculiar differences and creative distinctions among seasonal programs: many concerts have been dedicated, for example, to Jazz music, American and oriental music, percussions, choral, avant-garde, electronic, experimental and even rock music, but also to particular chamber music formations such as violin and piano, cello and piano, trios, quartets (Shostakovich's, Bartók's, Beethoven's, Mozart's and Schubert's) and quintets. Notable performers of these genres have been Luciano Berio, Adriano Guarnieri, Al Di Meola and Richard Galliano. The genoese violin tradition, undoubtedly linked to violinist Niccolò Paganini, has always had a great influence on the majority of Giovine Orchestra Genovese programs, resulting in several concerts dedicated to virtuoso performers and to the winners of the Paganini Competition: Salvatore Accardo, Gidon Kremer, Leonidas Kavakos, Isabelle Faust and the current 1st prize In Mo Yang.

Since 1991 Giovine Orchestra Genovese has been organizing its main concerts at Teatro Carlo Felice. Other locations are Genoa Cathedral, Chiesa del Gesù, Conservatorio "Niccolò Paganini" and the Palazzi dei Rolli.

Aside from these ones, the association hosts its theatre shows and musical performances for children and students (named as Rassegne di Teatro Musicale per Ragazzi) at Teatro di Sant'Agostino.

In 1997 Giovine Orchestra Genovese was awarded the Premio Franco Abbiati della critica musicale italiana.

== 100th anniversary celebrations ==
2012 marked the centennial anniversary of Giovine Orchestra Genovese and was celebrated within two concert seasons. Many artists, musicians and cultural and political personalities such as Salvatore Accardo, Annamaria Cancellieri, Bruno Canino, Riccardo Muti, Renzo Piano, Maurizio Pollini, Uto Ughi and Fabio Vacchi joined a special Honorary Committee of the Centennial, created on that occasion. During both the concert seasons Giovine Orchestra Genovese had organized some conferences and meetings to recount the first hundred years of its own life and released a commemorative book, "GOG 100. Un secolo di Giovine Orchestra Genovese", including some historical manuscripts, letters, concert posters, documents, acts and photos, which also contains the original Statute, the Orchestra rule book and the list of all Presidents and artistic directors since 1912.
The main event of the 100th anniversary has been the concert of the Orchestra Mozart, conducted by Claudio Abbado, on December 8, 2012.

== Activity ==
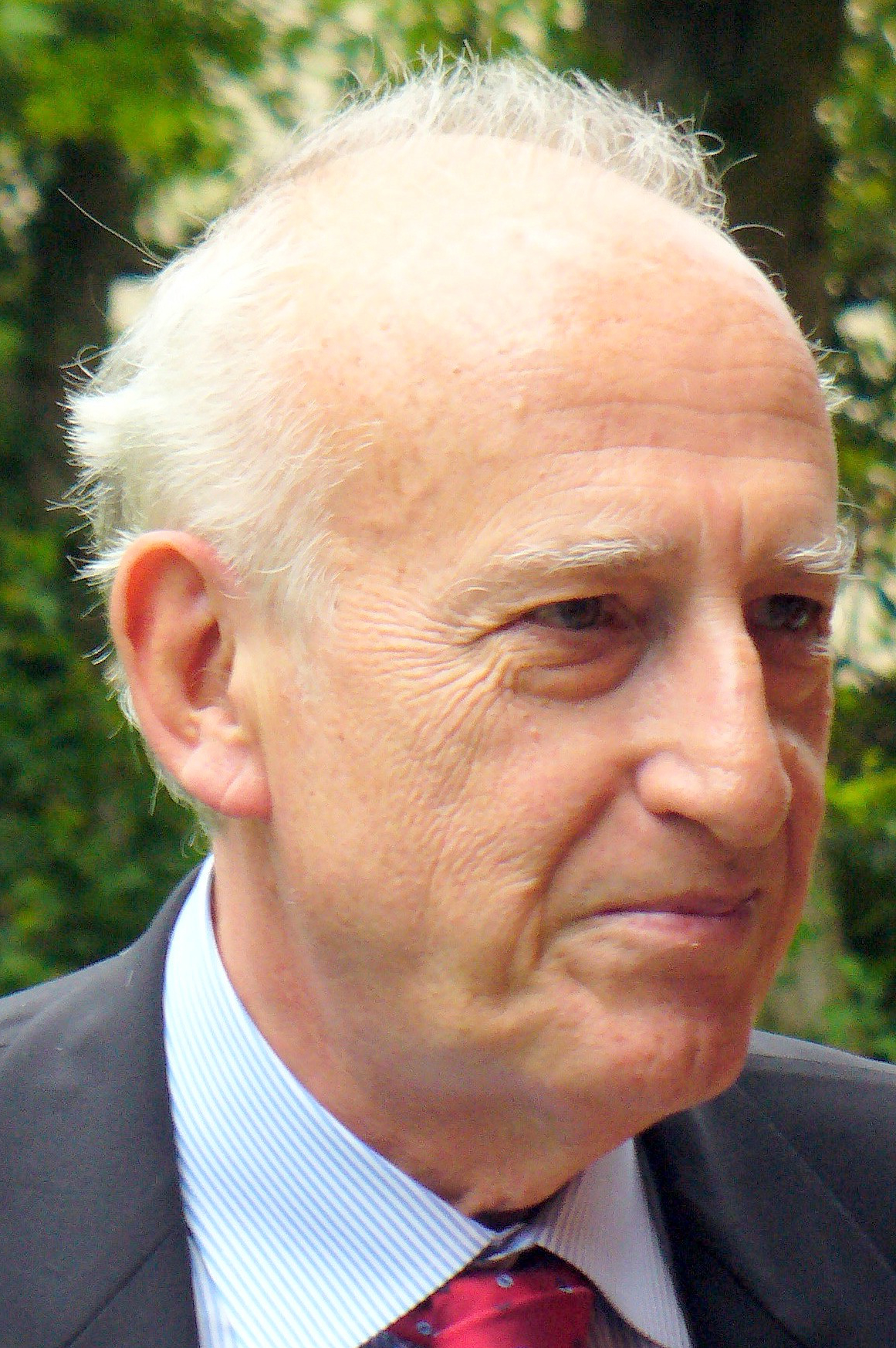
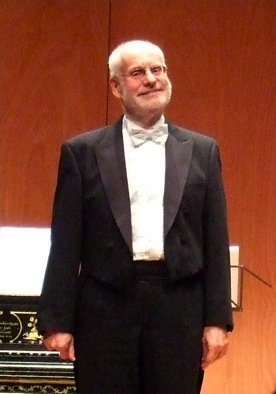
Italian pianist Maurizio Pollini (left) and Dutch harpsichordist and conductor Ton Koopman (right), two recurrent artists of Giovine Orchestra Genovese concert seasons.

Nowadays, Giovine Orchestra Genovese, a non-profitable organization since 2004, has established itself as one of the finest cultural centres in Italy and shares, along with the Teatro Carlo Felice own Opera and symphonic seasons, the greatest musical offering in Genoa.

Concert programs include piano recitals, chamber music formations, orchestras, choirs and vocal performers. The association also works closely with the main cultural, didactical and formative institutions in Genoa, in order to improve its offering: Doge's Palace, Teatro di Sant'Agostino, Galleria Nazionale di Palazzo Spinola, University of Genoa, Conservatorio "Niccolò Paganini".

Thanks to the active collaboration with the city high schools, the Conservatorio "Niccolò Paganini" and the University of Genoa, Giovine Orchestra Genovese supports young talented musicians by organizing lessons, concerts, listening sessions, conferences and meetings with famous musicians such as Uto Ughi and Maurizio Pollini. Similar activities have been successfully offered to penal institutions inmates.

== Artistic direction ==
From 1986 to 1995 pianist Bruno Canino was the artistic director of Giovine Orchestra Genovese. Conductor and oboist Pietro Borgonovo has been leading the artistic direction since 2000.

== List of Giovine Orchestra Genovese Presidents ==
| Years | Presidents |
|---|---|
| 1912 | Giovanni Semeria and Mario Barbieri (Provisional board) |
| 1920-1921 | Pietro Santamaria |
| 1913-1914 | Corrado Marchi |
| 1914-1919 | Suspended activity due to WWI |
| 1919-1920 | Ferruccio Beltrame |
| 1920-1921 | Pietro Santamaria |
| 1921-1922 | Ugo Erede |
| 1922-1930 | Alfredo R. Origone |
| 1930-1938 | Bernardo Gilardi |
| 1942-1945 | Suspended activity due to WWII |
| 1945-1982 | Giacomo Costa |
| 1982-1997 | Nicola Costa |
| 1997-1998 | Enrico Belloni |
| 1997-2004 | Mirella Rocco |
| 2004-current | Nicola Costa |

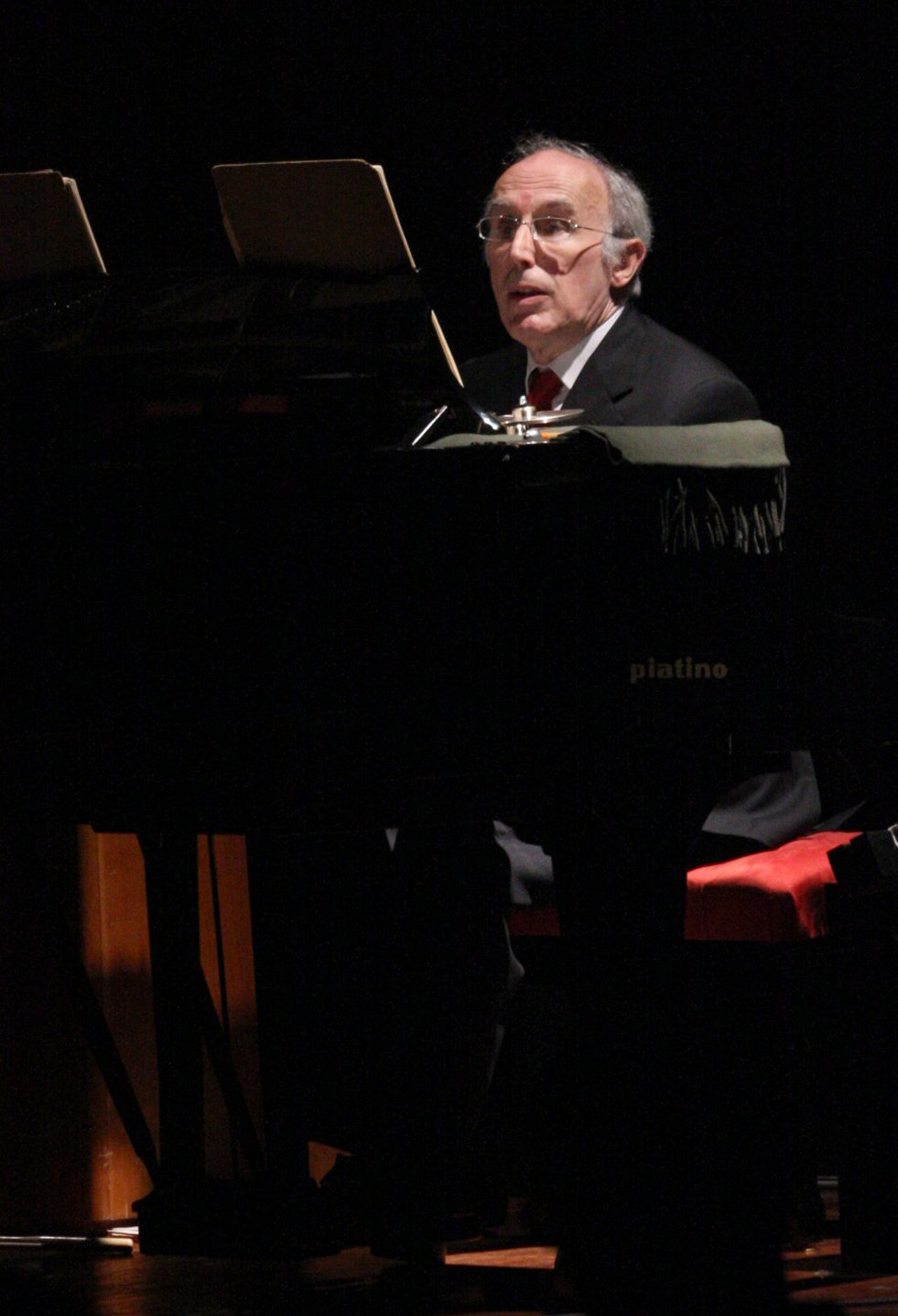
Italian pianist Bruno Canino led the Artistic Direction of Giovine Orchestra Genovese from 1986 to 1995.

== List of Giovine Orchestra Genovese Artistic Directors ==
| Years | Artistic Directors |
|---|---|
| 1912-1922 | Mario Barbieri |
| 1922-1923 | Angelo Questa |
| 1923-1924 | Ermete Canepa |
| 1924-1942 | Artistic committee - Augusto Silvestri |
| 1945-1986 | Artistic committee |
| 1986-1995 | Bruno Canino |
| 1995-2000 | Aldo Bennici |
| 2000-current | Pietro Borgonovo |

== Notable performers ==
- Claudio Abbado
- Salvatore Accardo
- Martha Argerich
- Claudio Arrau
- Vladimir Ashkenazy
- Wilhelm Backhaus
- Daniel Barenboim
- Arturo Benedetti Michelangeli
- Alfred Brendel
- Benjamin Britten
- Alfred Cortot
- Walter Gieseking
- Vladimir Horowitz
- Mieczyslaw Horszowski
- Gidon Kremer
- Leonidas Kavakos
- Wilhelm Kempff
- Evgeny Kissin
- Ton Koopman
- Lang Lang
- Dinu Lipatti
- Radu Lupu
- Nikita Magaloff
- Mischa Maisky
- Yehudi Menuhin
- Nathan Milstein
- Mnozil Brass
- Murray Perahia
- Itzhak Perlman
- Maria João Pires
- Maurizio Pollini
- Francis Poulenc
- Mstislav Rostropovich
- Sviatoslav Richter
- Royal Philharmonic Orchestra
- Arthur Rubinstein
- Jordi Savall
- András Schiff
- Andrés Segovia
- Grigory Sokolov
- The King's Singers
- Daniil Trifonov
- Mitsuko Uchida
- Uto Ughi
- Maxim Vengerov
- Arcadi Volodos
- Krystian Zimerman
- Pinchas Zukerman

== See also ==
- Arturo Toscanini
- Bruno Canino
- Doge's Palace
- Genoa
- Teatro Carlo Felice

== Bibliography ==
- Michele Mannucci, Genova a concerto. 75 anni della Giovine Orchestra Genovese, 1987, Giovine Orchestra Genovese, Genoa
- Giovine Orchestra Genovese, GOG 100. Un secolo di Giovine Orchestra Genovese, 2012, De Ferrari Editore, Genoa
