= Violin Concerto No. 4 (Paganini) =

Violin concerto by Niccolò Paganini

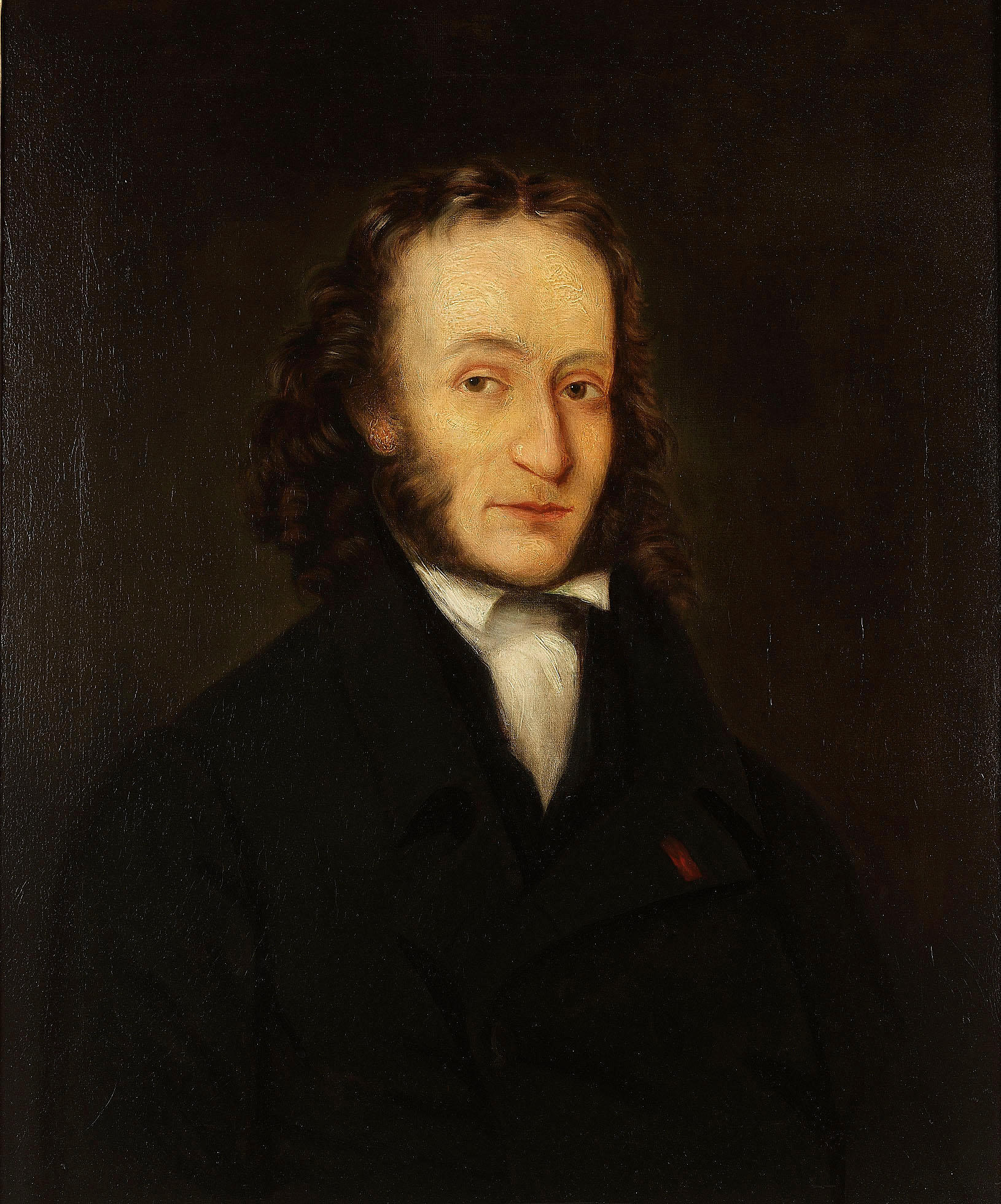
Niccolò Paganini in 1836 by John Whittle

Violin Concerto No. 4 in D minor, MS 60, is a concerto composed by Niccolò Paganini in the fall of 1829.

== History ==
This concerto was first performed in Germany, where it had been composed while Paganini was touring there. The "official" premiere was in Frankfurt am Main 26 April 1830. Spohr said the recently composed work "alternately charms and repels" and was a mix of "genius, childishness, and lack of taste." Paganini closely guarded the manuscript, taking it with him on his travels. The orchestral score was bought by a paper dealer in 1936 from the descendants of Paganini. This orchestral score was bought by Natale Gallini, but the solo violin part was unaccounted for. Gallini made it a personal crusade to find the missing part, and eventually it was located in a collection of music which had belonged to Giovanni Bottesini, the famous Italian double-bass virtuoso. Gallini at this point gave the complete musical score to his son, conductor Franco Gallini. With Arthur Grumiaux on the violin, the work received its "second world premiere" on November 7, 1954, again in Paris.

== Form ==
The concerto follows the standard form consisting of three movements, fast – slow – fast, as popularized by Antonio Vivaldi in the late-17th and early-18th centuries.

The three movements are as follows:

1. Allegro maestoso
2. Adagio flebile con sentimento
3. Rondo galante. Andantino gaio

=== I. Allegro maestoso ===
The tempo marking here means "brisk and majestic". The movement modulates from D minor → F major → A minor → D minor → D major.

The first movement begins with a powerful Beethoven-esque theme with striking similarity to the third movement of Vivaldi's Violin Concerto No. 6 consisting of a six-note melody, played by the viola and violin sections, punctuated by strong and syncopated lower-octave accents by the remainder of the orchestra. After dancing together down the D minor scale, the two string sections soar even higher to the perfect fifth, before finding resolution via a broken two-octave arpeggio in D harmonic minor. (This initial theme is the basis for most of the variations throughout the concerto.)

The loud and strong fifteen-second statement is followed by a brief respite where the strings play smoothly with sublime qualities incorporating string-plucking (a now-popular technique made famous by Paganini). After two repetitions of these contrasting segments with slight variations, the soloist enters boldly and alone, expounding upon the main theme with ascending arpeggios requiring great virtuosity. The colorful, bright notes take the listener through the highest register of the violin, pushing the limits not only of the instrument but also of the performer. Without compromising feel, melody, or the contiguous nature of the music, Paganini has already blended strength, passion, and technical wizardry in less than ten seconds of this solo passage. Proceeding with extended lyrical melodies highlighted by trills, staccato 32nd notes, arpeggios, double-stops, and vibrato on the highest of notes, the dance-like nature of the music is never completely lost.

After an interplay with the orchestra, the 2nd solo opens with a chromatic sequence using the raised 4th and descends using the 'b' natural note creating a Spanish flavor in the key of A minor. This passage also hints at Paganini's more comical side while further demonstrating his command of the instrument with string-skipping, chromatic runs, double-stop slides in tenths, and fluid scale runs.

At the twelve-minute mark, another brief interplay with the orchestra is immediately followed by the cadenza. Implementing all of the aforementioned techniques, as well as diminished arpeggios, the rapid-fire bowing of broken chords, and left-hand finger plucking, the soloist is finally joined by the rest of the "band" for a galloping climatic conclusion.

=== II. Adagio flebile con sentimento (attacca) ===
The second movement, in F♯ minor, is aptly titled Adagio flebile con sentimento (slow and tearful, with sentiment). Though renowned for his dazzling virtuosity and unrivaled skills, here Paganini elegantly bares his soul. The central section of this movement consists of a dialogue between the soloist and the orchestra, followed by a repeat of the opening solo, little varied from the original presentation. The movement ends with a coda, utilizing obstinate basses and violin thirds. Paganini writes "attacca" (play the subsequent movement at once, without pause).

=== III. Rondo galante. Andantino gaio ===
The finale is a "gallant" rondo in D minor, with a central section in B♭ major. The tempo is "andantino" usually taken to mean slightly faster than andante, and is "gaio" cheerful. The movement consists of alternating solo and tutti. A trio section features an opening fanfare by trumpets, but a quiet violin solo ensues. The concerto is brought to a close by the full orchestra, with the solo instrument playing double notes in the high register for contrast. The sonata ends in D minor.

== Recordings ==
- Arthur Grumiaux with Franco Gallini conducting l'Orchestre des Concerts Lamoureux (Philips A 00741 R) (1955), re-released Philips 462865 (1999)
- Salvatore Accardo with Charles Dutoit conducting the London Philharmonic Orchestra (Deutsche Grammophon) 437210
- Henryk Szeryng, with Alexander Gibson conducting the London Symphony Orchestra (Philips Classics) 446 572-2, recorded in 1976 and transferred to ADD format in 1995
- Gidon Kremer with Riccardo Muti conducting Vienna Philharmonic, recorded in 1995, (Philips) 446718.
- Alexei Gorokhov with Zakhary Kozharsky conducting The Chamber Orchestra of the Shevchenko Opera Theatre, Kyiv

== Bibliography ==
- Tatiana Berford and Philippe Borer, "Allusive masterpiece", in The Strad, vol. 115, n. 1374, October 2004, pp. 1032–1039
