= Alessio Bidoli =

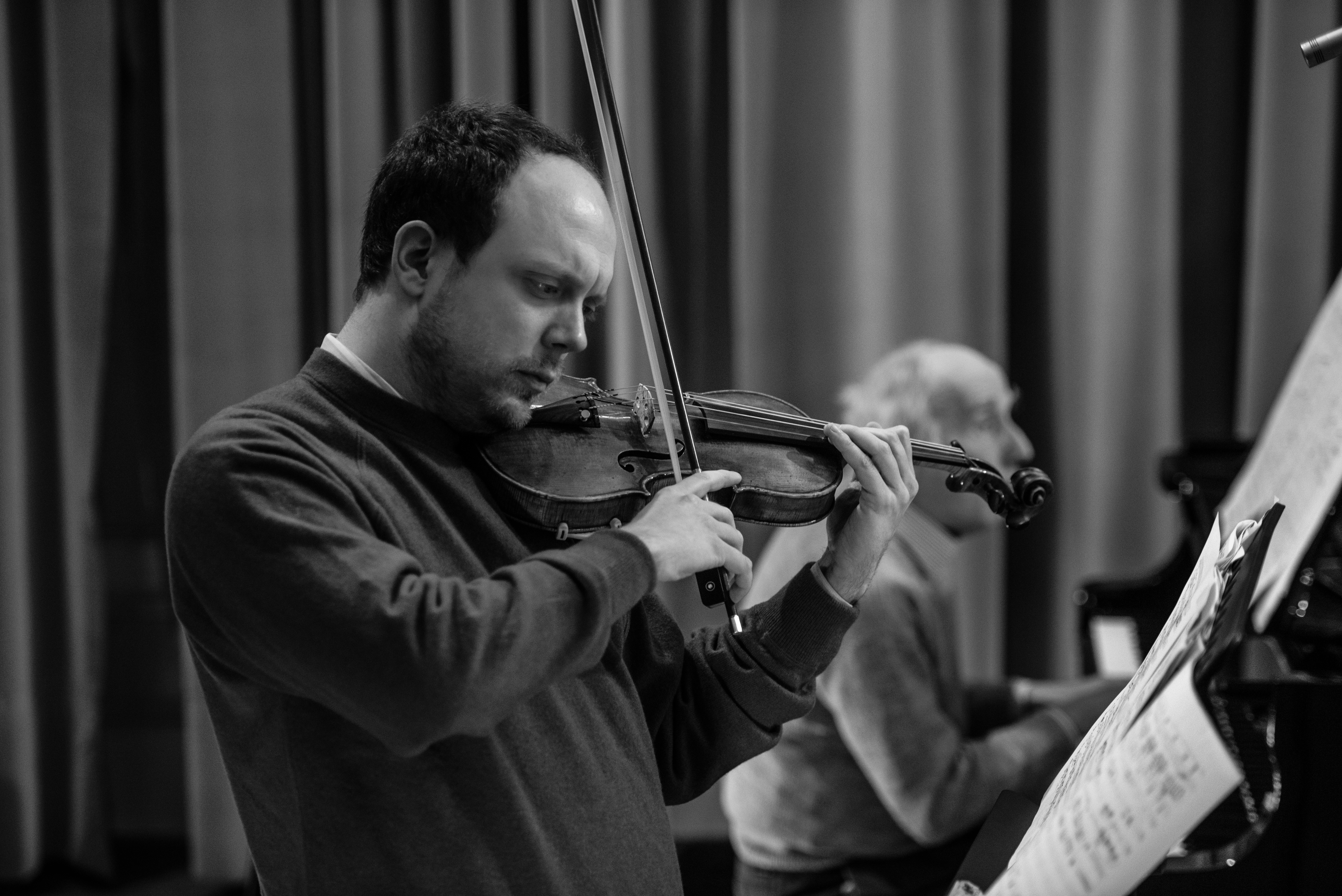

Background information
- Born: 1986 (age 39–40)
- Genre: Classical
- Occupation: Violinist
- Instrument: Violin
- Labels: Sony Classical; Universal Classics and Jazz; Decca Records; Warner Classics
- Website: www.alessiobidoli.com

Alessio Bidoli (Milan, 18 August 1986) is an Italian violinist.

== Biography ==
His father is a doctor and his mother, Domenica Regazzoni, is a painter and a sculptor.

Since he was a child, Bidoli had hung out at the manufacture of stringed instruments of his grandfather, Dante Paolo Regazzoni, a luthier operating in the second half of the twentieth century in his laboratory in Cortenova, in Valsassina. In this luthiery, Bidoli learned the first music rudiments and so he started to play his grandfather's violins. As a child he was already directed by his parents towards a career as a violinist, enrolling him in the violin course at the Giuseppe Verdi Conservatory of Music in Milan. Here his first teacher was Gigino Maestri. In 2003 he made his debut during a concert as a soloist at the Teatro Signorelli in Cortona, with a repertoire of classical music. The following year, he was one of the winners of the National String Festival of Vittorio Veneto. His educational path finished at the Conservatory in Milan where Bidoli gained a diploma with top marks cum laude in 2006. He continued with various specialization courses at the Haute Ecole de Musique in Lausanne and then at the Mozarteum in Salzburg with Pierre Amoyal. Furthermore, he attended a specialization course at the Accademia Chigiana in Siena with Salvatore Accardo. Then he attended another course at the Accademia Internazionale di Imola with Pavel Berman and Oleksandr Semchuk.

=== Career ===
In 2007 he collaborated with the Lausanne Chamber Orchestra under the direction of Pierre Amoyal, performing in several European cities including Martigny, Milan and Marseille, the latter within the Festival de Musique à Saint‑Victor. In 2011 his career was interrupted when he was diagnosed with Guillain‑Barré syndrome. After successfully recovering, he returned to the stage in the same year with a recital for the Società dei Concerti di Milano at the Sala Verdi of the Conservatory.

In the following years he performed as a soloist in several concert seasons, including MITO Settembre Musica, the Società del Quartetto di Milano, the Società dei Concerti di Milano (Sala Verdi), Serate Musicali di Milano, Furcht–Università Bocconi, the Amici della Loggia of the Teatro alla Scala, and the Fondazione Musica Insieme in Bologna. He also appeared for the Friends of Music of Sondalo, the Sicilian Association of Friends of Music in Palermo, the Arvedi Auditorium in Cremona, the Paganiniano Festival in Carro, and in the “Violinist on the Roof” series in Cremona (Arvedi Auditorium). He later performed at the Bergamo International Culture Festival in collaboration with Sony Classical Italia. In January 2013 he gave a recital in Wolfsburg, Germany, at the Gartensaal Schloss.

In October 2015, accompanied on the piano by Luigi Moscatello, he performed at the Obratzsova Cultural Center in St. Petersburg, presenting a program featuring works by Niccolò Paganini, Antonio Bazzini, Camillo Sivori and Lipót Auer. The following month, with pianist Bruno Canino, he appeared at the tenth edition of the Italian Festival in Thailand, held at the auditorium of Chulalongkorn University in Bangkok, performing music by Maurice Ravel, Gaetano Pugnani, Fritz Kreisler, Paganini, Robert Schumann, Henryk Wieniawski, Sivori and Bazzini. In 2015 he also performed at the Teatro di Chiasso together with Vittorio Sgarbi in Il Fin la Maraviglia, a theatrical project combining images and music devoted to the Baroque.

In 2017, during the XVII Week of the Italian Language in the World, he performed in Riga with pianist Francesco Attesti and clarinetist Pietro Tagliaferri, presenting works by Bazzini, Sivori and Francis Poulenc. On 28 April 2022 he performed at the Italian Cultural Institute in Copenhagen with a program including works by Handel, Beethoven, Grieg and Ravel, accompanied by Luigi Moscatello. On 8 April 2023 he appeared at Park Avenue in New York in the “Piano on Park” series, performing with pianist Jiarong Li. He has also been invited as a guest on various radio programs, including Radio France, NDR Kultur, RSI, RAI Radio 3, Radio Vaticana, Radio Classica and Radio Popolare.

Bidoli has taught at the G. Donizetti Higher Institute of Musical Studies in Bergamo and, for two years, at the Niccolò Piccinni Conservatory of Bari, the Niccolò Paganini Conservatory of Genoa, the Francesco Cilea Conservatory of Reggio Calabria, and at the Accademia del Ridotto. He has held violin and chamber‑music masterclasses in several Italian cities. In 2020 he became artistic director of the Musica in Corte Festival in Crema, and in 2023 he curated the first edition of the Villa Mirabello Classica Festival in Milan.

On 28 April 2024 he appeared with pianist Bruno Canino in the “Concerti della Domenica” series at Mantua’s Teatro Bibiena, performing a program titled Anime virtuose that included works by Tartini/Kreisler, Saint‑Saëns, Brahms and Ravel.

In 2025 he became artistic director of New York Classica, a music organization based in New York City.

On 20 October 2025 he performed at the Weill Recital Hall in a recital with pianist Michael Fennelly. Shortly afterwards, on 5 November 2025, Bidoli and Canino gave a duo recital at Vienna’s Musikverein (Metallener Saal), performing works by Tartini/Kreisler, Finzi, Saint‑Saëns and Ravel.

The Bidoli–Canino duo also performed in Palermo on 18 November 2025 as part of the centennial season of the Associazione Siciliana Amici della Musica at the Politeama Garibaldi, presenting a program featuring works by Tartini, Brahms, Saint‑Saëns and Ravel.

=== Musical repertoire ===
The repertoire he has performed and recorded over the years spans a wide range of classical and modern works. It includes major classical authors such as Camille Saint‑Saëns, as well as works by Igor Stravinsky, Francis Poulenc, Sergei Prokofiev and Maurice Ravel.

His repertoire also extends to late‑19th‑century composers now largely forgotten, whose virtuosic paraphrases by Camillo Sivori and Antonio Bazzini helped bring Verdi’s operatic music into domestic salons.

He has further explored unpublished or rarely performed 20th‑century works by Goffredo Petrassi, Gian Francesco Malipiero and Alfredo Casella, as well as the lesser‑known chamber repertoire of Nino Rota.

His work also includes the chamber music of the Portuguese composer Luís de Freitas Branco, whose output remains little known outside Portugal.

In 2025 he released, again in duo with Bruno Canino, the complete recording of Johannes Brahms’s Violin Sonatas on the album Johannes Brahms – The Violin Sonatas, issued by Warner Music Italy.

=== Instruments ===
Bidoli owns some musical violins. During his concerts, he plays one of the violins made by Stefano Scarampella and one of the instruments made by his grandfather, Dante Paolo Regazzoni.

== Recordings ==
A selection of Bidoli's recorded output includes;

- 2025: with Bruno Canino (piano) - Johannes Brahms - The violin sonatas, Warner Classics
- 2022: with Bruno Canino (piano), Alain Meunier (cello) - Freitas Branco Complete Violin Sonatas and Piano Trio, Sony Classical
- 2021: with Stefania Mormone (piano) - Saint-Saëns / Wieniawski / Grieg / Ponce / Elgar / Debussy (reissue), Da Vinci Classics
- 2020: with Bruno Canino (piano), Massimo Mercelli (flute) and Nicoletta Sanzin (harp) - Rota Chamber Works, Decca - Universal Music Group
- 2019: with Bruno Canino - Verdi Fantasias (reissue), Concerto Classics
- 2018: with Bruno Canino - Saint Saëns Violin Sonatas, Warner Classics
- 2017: with Bruno Canino - Poulenc, Ravel, Stravinsky, Prokofiev, Warner Classics
- 2016: with Bruno Canino - Italian Soul - Anima italiana, Sony Classical
- 2013: with Bruno Canino (piano) - Verdi: Fantasias for Violin and Piano, Sony Classical
- 2011: with Stefania Mormone (piano) - Saint-Saëns / Wieniawski / Grieg / Ponce / Elgar / Debussy (reissue), Amadeus magazine
