= Stefano Scarampella =

Stefano Scarampella (1843 – 23 January 1925) was an Italian violin and cello maker. He is considered to be one of the best 20th century violin makers. The tonal quality of his instruments have been compared to those of Giovanni Battista Guadagnini. He did not start making violins and cellos until he was in his forties. Stefano's father Paolo was a part-time violin maker. His brother, Giuseppe Scarampella, was also a violin maker and Stefano worked with him until his brother's death in 1902. After which, Stefano, took full control over Giuseppe's tools and business. He was born in Brescia and moved to Mantua in 1886, where he died in 1925. His instruments are sought after by musicians and collectors. It is believed that he made between 800 and 900 instruments during his career.

== Users ==
- Tom Chiu
- Jasper Wood
- Alessio Bidoli

Walter-Michael Vollhardt
