= Giovanni Semeria =

Italian preacher (1867–1931)

Giovanni Semeria (26 September 1867 – 15 March 1931) was an Italian preacher and author. He was one of the most high-profile representatives of Italian Catholicism during the early decades of the twentieth century. In 1912 he founded the Giovine Orchestra Genovese. Probably his more defining legacy is the Opera nazionale per il Mezzogiorno d'Italia (O.N.P.M.I. / loosely, "National Operation for Southern Italy") which he set up with Giovanni Minozzi to create and operate a chain of orphanages and associated educational facilities, addressing an urgent necessity created by the slaughter of the First World War.

== Biography ==
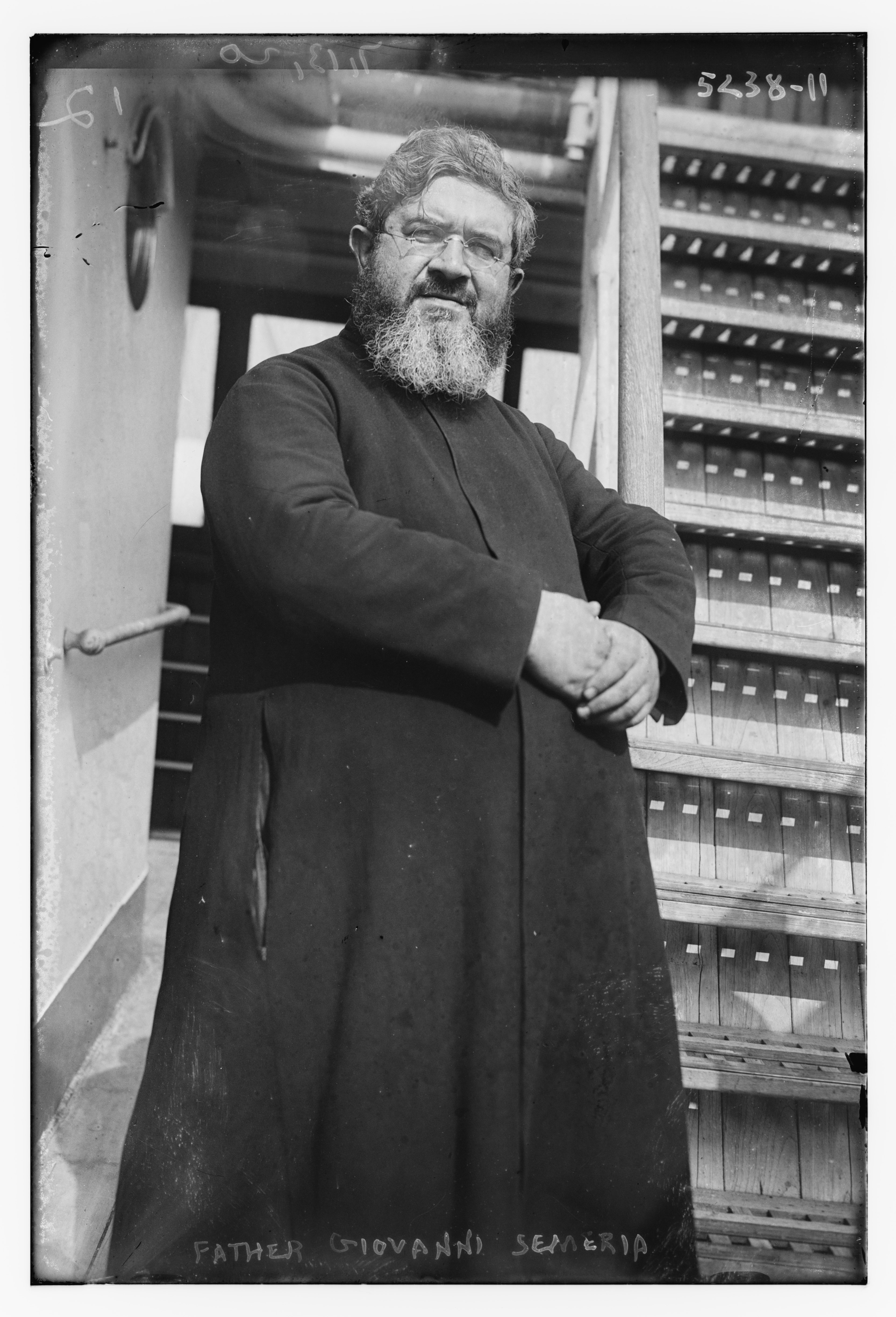
Father Giovanni Semeria in 1915

=== Provenance ===
Giovanni Semeria was born during the aftermath of the 1866 Italian War of Independence. In accordance with his late father's wishes, he was born in Colle which at that time was an autonomous municipality, but which has subsequently been renamed as Coldirodi and in 1925 subsumed into San Remo, a sprawling coastal municipality along the coast between Genoa and Nice. His father, also called Giovanni, died when an outbreak of Cholera gripped the regiment in which he was serving during the course of the war. His widowed mother settled near Turin and took as her second husband Pietro Grosso. The fact that he was an orphan conditioned Semera's entire life.

=== Early years ===
When he was 9 Giovanni's mother sent him to a boarding school in Cremona, under Jesuit influence: he remained at school in Cremona until he was 14. He was then transferred to the Carlo Alberto Academy ("Real Collegio Carlo Alberto") at Moncalieri (near Turin) where the principal influence came from Barnabites. It was here that his vocation matured, which led him to break off his schooling. The boy was still only 15 when he entered the Barnabite order at Santa Maria al Carrobiolo (Monza) as a novice. He received his monk's habit on 8 October 1882 and was permitted to vote as a member of the Barnabite order for the first time on 22 October 1883.

=== Rome ===
He studied Philosophy and Theology in Rome and was ordained into the priesthood on 5 April 1890, still not yet 23. During his student years he manifested a singular enthusiasm for public speaking, which was something that would never leave him. Following his ordination he remained in Rome for several years, teaching seminarian students and contributing to theological magazines. He was elected to membership of several learned societies. In October 1892 the Pope invited him to attend the Scientific Congress in Genoa, which involved a trip back to the north.

=== Return to Genoa ===
By the time he left Rome and relocated to Genoa in 1895 he had acquired a burgeoning reputation as a teacher, a writer of articles on church matters, and as a preacher. Two years later he was invited to preach the 1897 Lent sermons at the basilica San Lorenzo in Damaso in Rome where he attracted crowds that overflowed up the altar steps and into the apse beyond. The sermons greatly extended his reputation, and over the next few years he accepted invitations to preach in France, Belgium, Switzerland, England, Asia, Africa, and the United States.

=== Sent away ===
For many years he lived at the Vittorino da Feltre College in Genoa, surrounded by the young people for whom he wrote many of his early books. At the same time he continued to appear in some of Italy's most important pulpits, sustaining a reputation for oratorical brilliance. Within the church hierarchy there were, however, who found him a threat. Leading the charge was Cardinal de Lai, an outspoken and well-networked conservative prelate with a bitter and longstanding hostility to the Barnabites. Semeria was accused ("unjustly") of fomenting Modernism and in the end he was sent away to Brussels, leaving Genoa incognito on the night of 21/22 September 1912. Silenced for the next two years, he was able to concentrate on ministering to families of the Italian expatriates who had moved to Belgium, attracted by the employment opportunities provided by the coal mines and associated heavy industries.

On 19 July 1914 Semeria left for a break to visit his mother who by this time was staying with one of his childhood friends at Lopagno (TI) in Switzerland. While he was there, on 4 August 1914 rumours reached him that the First World War had broken out at the end of the previous month and that Belgium faced imminent invasion. The rumours were correct which meant he was unable to return to Belgium. He was still unable to enter Italy, following the difficulties that had led to his departure in 1912. He spent the next few months in Geneva at the Bonomelliano Mission, helping to provide assistance to Italians abroad, and identified to his fellow monks as "Don Dosio, a priest from Piedmont".

=== War ===
Semeria never wanted war and certainly never would have promoted it, but was slowly converted to acceptance that it was the political reality. On a human level he was not insensitive to the emotional response engendered by the invasion of Belgium. More widely, there was no shortage of priests desperately applying to be involved on the frontline, for instance as military chaplains. Meanwhile, within the military establishment there were concerns that involving priests in the actual fighting, especially priests with a history of outspokenness and oratorical effectiveness, risked introducing unhelpful and inappropriate shades of pacifism to the fighting troops. At the same time, Marshall Cadorna, Chief of Staff of the Italian Army between 1914 and 1917, was on record as being personally in favour of the involvement of military chaplains on the frontline. Cadorna had been posted to Genoa back in 1911: he and Semeria had known each other well since that time. In June 1915 Cadorna invited Semeria to come for a meeting at Treviso. Semeria was still banned from entering Italy and there was no question of his crossing the border from Switzerland going unnoticed: there is shrill written evidence in surviving sources of consternation on the part of Cardinal de Lai and a number of others. Nevertheless, Semeria's passage was not blocked, and despite some uncertainty along the way as to whether he would attend the meeting – which may have resulted simply from his messages not being delivered as anticipated – on 13 June 1915 Giovanni Semeria did indeed enjoy the rare (for a priest) privilege of a personal meeting with the supreme commander of the Italian army. The upshot was his appointment as a military chaplain, though in the immediate term he was given no information on where he would be sent.

The next three years were a time of feverish activity, both priestly and humanitarian, providing for the soldiers' spiritual necessities and for needs that were purely material. There were endless homilies to be delivered, conferences and intense conversations at many levels, masses on the frontline, confessions, visits to the wounded and a huge amount of correspondence to be handled, often in response to the "most unexpected requests". It was during this period that one ambition above all others came to the fore, which Semeria shared with another military chaplain, Giovanni Minozzi from the Abruzzo: the war would one day end, and after it they should take care of all the orphans it had created. Fulfilling that ambition was the project to which, using all his gifts with the spoken and written word, Giovanni Semeria would devote the final decade of his life. Most of the soldiers through whose deaths they lived came from the Italian south, an impoverished region geographically distant from the war on the northern borders, where the loss of family breadwinners would be felt especially acutely, and it was clear to Semeria and Minozzi that it was in the south of the country that destitution resulting from the slaughter of war would be particularly intense.

=== Orphans ===
War ended in 1918 and already in 1919 plans were well advanced for two orphanages; one in Amatrice across the mountains to the east of Rome, and a second in Gioia del Colle, far to the south, near Bari. War had left the principal nation states of Europe close to bankruptcy, and there was no longer so large a class of people as before 1914, willing to part with significant amounts of cash for Christian philanthropy. Semeria and Minozzi devised a strategy which between November 1919 and July 1920 involved splitting up. Minozzi took what Semeria later described as "the more prosaic part" ("la parte più prosaica"), staying in Italy to continue with the work of looking for sites, organising land clearance and building preparations, looking after relations with local authorities and coordinating funding appeals in Italy and neighbouring countries, while Semeria took the "more poetic part", travelling to the United States of America where there were American dollars and the "generous hearts of our emigrants" ("i cuori generosi dei nostri emigranti"). His skill as a public speaker combined with his first hand experience of the scale of the orphan issue created by the war to make him a highly effective fund raiser. He addressed church congregations and public meetings in theatres and town halls. In the words of one source, people "were astonished by this bearded figure with such a picturesque and disorderly style...". Astonished or not, many were moved to open their pocketbooks. By the end of 1919, not two but four orphanages had already been opened: two in Amatrice and a fourth in Potenza (between Salerno and Bari).

The scale of the initiative, and of Semeria's success in attracting generous international financial support for it, quickly became apparent. The operation was registered as a legal entity on 13 January 1921 with a name redolent of its founders' ambitions for it: Opera nazionale per il Mezzogiorno d'Italia (O.N.P.M.I. / loosely, "National Operation for Southern Italy"). Ten years later the O.N.P.M.I. had looked after more than 1,000 orphans in 14 orphanages, more than 6,000 in 60 Kindergartens with workshop annexes, with 20 alpine and coastal summer-camp locations. Semeria's passionate fundraising, using homilies, participating at conferences, producing publications, was undiminished. The entire purpose of "selling himself" in this way was to engage support for "his orphans". It was notable that despite his own educational background, there was no attempt to use the O.N.P.M.I. as a training ground for theological scholarship. Semeria was more than content to guide the children towards skilled manual and artisanal trades, for which there were desperate labour shortages in the northern half of the country.

=== Death at Sparanise ===
Giovanni Semeria delivered his final speech at Montecassino. Still smiling, he was nevertheless now obviously exhausted and seriously ill. He returned to his orphanage at nearby Sparanise where he was staying. He collapsed and died in the presence of Minozzi, the nuns, the orphans, those who love and admiration he had earned. His body was taken to the Barnabite monastery in Rome, wrapped in the Italian flag. In the end his remains were buried at an O.N.P.M.I. summer camp which he was particularly fond, at Monterosso al Mare along the coast from La Spezia.
