= Ticino Musica Festival =

Classical music festival in Ticino, Switzerland

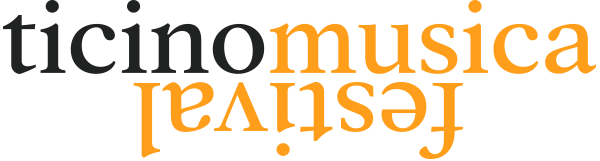
- Genre: Classical music
- Dates: 18th-31st July
- Locations: Ticino, Switzerland
- Years active: 1997-present
- Founders: Janos Meszaros
- Website: https://www.ticinomusica.com/en

The Ticino Musica Festival is an international classical music festival that takes place every year from the 18th to the 31st July in Ticino, in the southern Switzerland. It includes masterclasses, the International Opera Studio "Silvio Varviso", concerts and other events.

== History ==
The Festival was founded in 1979 by Janos Meszaros, starting in Assisi and then in Riva del Garda until it moved to the present place in 1997, where it fully developed to reach its actual state.

The aim of the festival is to offer the possibility to young musicians to develop themselves, meeting and playing with colleagues and teachers from all over the world. It also promotes the tourismus and the cultural life of the region by offering during the two weeks musical public events

It presents every year new rising stars from the musical world, including in its agenda concerts performed by winners of the ARD International Music Competition and the Prague Spring International Music Competition.

== Academy ==
Teachers of the past editions
Strings	Woodwinds	Brass	Keyboards and percussions	Others
=== Violin === : Carlo Chiarappa; Thomas Christian; Josef Frölich; Mark Gonthoi; Valery Gradow; Franco Gulli; Franco Mezzena; Stephan Picard; Massimo Quarta; Marco Rizzi	=== Flute === : András Adorján; Mario Ancillotti; János Bálint; Angela Firkins; Jean-Claude Gérard; Marianne Henkel; Lóránt Kovács; Susan Milan; Andrea Oliva; Felix Renggli	=== Trumpet === : Éric Aubier; Frits Damrow; Luis Gonzalez; Hannes Läubin; Peter Leiner; Bo Nilsson; Anthony Plog; Max Sommerhalder	=== Piano === : Paul Badura-Skoda; Homero Francesch; Bruno Mezzena; Adrian Oetiker; Zsuzsanna Sirokay; Oxana Yablonskaya	=== Composition === : Ondrej Adamek; Michael Barolsky; Oscar Bianchi; George Crumb; Bernhard Gander; Carles Guinovart; Michael Jarrel; Dmitri Kourliandski; Johannes Schöllhorn; Simon Steen-Andersen; Mathias Steinauer; Vladimir Tarnopolsky
=== Cello === : Enrico Dindo; Gabriele Geminiani; Giovanni Gnocchi; Johannes Goritzki	=== Clarinet === : François Benda; Eduard Brunner; Philippe Cuper; José Luis Estellés; Sharon Kam; Karl Leister; Sabine Meyer; Calogero Palermo; Johannes Peitz; Ulf Rodenhäuser; Reiner Wehle	=== Trombone === : Michel Becquet; Ian Bousfield; David Brouchez-Lally; Jonas Bylund; Andrea Conti; Jacques Deleprancque; Lorenzo Ghirlanda; Vincent Lepape; Fabrice Millischer; Stafan Schultz; Branimir Slokar; Carsten Svanberg	=== Organ and Harpsichord === : Stefano Molardi	=== Chamber music === : Emile Cantor; Piero Farulli; Antonello Farulli; Ulrich Koella; Ada Gradow (piano accompaniment); Charles-André Linale; Gabor Meszaros; Janos Meszaros; Emilian Piedicuta; Zsuzsanna Sirokay
=== Viola === : Matthias Buchholz; Corinne Contardo; Rainer Moog; Hariolf Schlichtig	=== Oboe === : Maurice Bourgue; Ingo Goritzki; Omar Zoboli	=== Horn === : Christian-Friedrich Dallmann; Henrik Halén; Johannes Hinterholzer; Michael Höltzel; David Johnson; Christian Lampert; Frank Lloyd; Froydis Ree Wekre; Michael Thompson; Zdeněk Tylšar	=== Percussions === : Mircea Ardeleanu; Pierre Favre	=== Voice === : Giovanna Canetti; Luisa Castellani; Fiorenza Cedolins; Sherman Lowe; Bernatte Manca Di Nissa; Éva Marton; Edith Mathis; Magda Olivero; Tamar Rachum; Olga Romanko; Michaela Schuster; Luciana Serra; Charles Spencer; Maria Venuti; Hilde Zadek
=== Doublebass === : Gergely Jardanyi; Giuseppe Ettorre; Enrico Fagone; Felix Maiwald; Thomas Martin; Ludwig Streicher	=== Bassoon === : Gabor Meszaros; Janos Meszaros; Knut Sönstevold; William Waterhouse	=== Tuba === : James Gourlay; Anne Jelle Visser; Knut Riser		=== Violin making === : Jürgen von Stietencron
=== Harp === : Judith Liber; Fabrice Pierre; Irina Zingg				=== Conducting === : Arturo Tamayo
=== Guitar === : Hubert Käppel; Massimo Laura; Ricardo Gallén; Lorenzo Micheli; Andreas von Wangenheim				

== International Opera Studio "Silvio Varviso" ==
Ticino Musica Festival is including since 2004 the international opera studio dedicated to the Austrian conductor Silvio Varviso, where young singers have the possibility to study and perform selected lyric operas, challenging their abilities and their talent, under the guidance of expert teachers.

During the years directors, screenwriters and conductor from all over the world participated, such as Umberto Finazzi, Paul Suter, Martin Markun, Erich Holliger, Laura Cosso, Marco Gandini, Claudio Cinelli, Stefanie C. Braun e Daniele Piscopo.

Operas performed in the past editions
Year	Opera	Composer
2004	Il matrimonio segreto	Domenico Cimarosa
2006	La finta giardiniera	Wolfgang Amadeus Mozart
2007	Il mondo della luna	Joseph Haydn
2008	Il signor Bruschino	Gioachino Rossini
2011	La scala di seta	Gioachino Rossini
2012	L'occasione fa il ladro	Gioachino Rossini
2013	La cambiale di matrimonio	Gioachino Rossini
2014	Don Giovanni	Wolfgang Amadeus Mozart
2015	The Marriage of Figaro	Wolfgang Amadeus Mozart
2016	L'elisir d'amore	Gaetano Donizetti
2017	Così fan tutte	Wolfgang Amadeus Mozart
2018	L'italiana in Algeri	Gioachino Rossini
2019	Don Pasquale	Gaetano Donizetti
2021	The Barber of Seville	Gioacchino Rossini
