= Ingo Goritzki =

- Born: 22 February 1939 (age 87); Berlin, Germany
- Genre: Classical
- Occupation: Solo musician
- Instruments: Oboe, piano, cor anglais, heckelphone, flute

Ingo Goritzki (born 22 February 1939 in Berlin, Germany) is a German oboist, pianist, and flautist. He began his flute and piano studies in Freiburg, and switched to oboe as his primary instrument at age 20.

== Career ==
Goritzki plays both the modern oboe and the Baroque oboe, and has also played the cor anglais and heckelphone. He studied with Helmut Winschermann in Detmold and he had a long chamber music partnership with Pablo Casals and Sandor Vegh in Paris. He won prizes at national and international competitions in Birmingham, Prague, and Geneva. He was Principal Oboe at the Sinfonieorchester Basel (Switzerland) and Frankfurt Radio Symphony.

In 1976, Goritzki received the professor post at the Staatliche Hochschule für Musik und Theater of Hannover and later at the Staatliche Hochschule für Musik und Darstellende Kunst of Stuttgart. He gives master classes worldwide, including Internationale Bachakademie Stuttgart, Landesstiftung Villa Musica Mainz, Goethe-Institut Munich, Internationale Sommerakademie Salzburg, Internationales Festival Ticino Musica Locarno, Royal Academy of Music London, the Australian National Academy of Music, and others.
