= Diabolus in Musica, Accardo interpreta Paganini =

Diabolus in Musica

Studio album by Salvatore Accardo, London Philharmonic Orchestra Charles Dutoit
- Released: 1996
- Genre: Classical
- Label: Deutsche Grammophon

Diabolus in Musica, Accardo interpreta Paganini is a 1996 classical music album by violinist Salvatore Accardo playing musical works of Niccolò Paganini.

== Track listing ==
- La Risate del Diavolo (tema) [0'34]
- La Campanella Rondo dal Concerto per violino e orchestra n. 2 [9'02]
- Capriccio per violino solo n. 5 Agitato [2'21]
- Adagio flebile con sentimento [6'50]
- Rondo galante. Andantino gaio dal Concerto per violino e orchestra n. 4 [11'13]
- Introduzione e variazioni su God save the king op. 9 [6'48]
- Capriccio per violino solo n. 24 Tema. Quasi Presto - Variazioni - Finale [4'30]
- Polacca. Andantino vivace dal Concerto per violino e orchestra n. 3 [11'37]
- Capriccio per violino solo n. 1 Andante [1'51]
- Rondo. Allegro spirituoso dal Concerto per violino e orchestra n. 1, op. 6 [9'47]
- Capriccio per violino solo n. 13 Allegro [2'04]
- Sonata Moto Perpetuo Allegro vivace [3'11]
