= Music of Genoa =

The music of Genoa includes a number of important musical venues. Genoa, a major port, is the capital of the region of Liguria and in the 19th century aspired to recognition as a cultural center more in keeping with its role as a major city in the history of the Risorgimento, the political, social, and military movement that eventually led to the unification of the modern nation state of Italy.

== Venues ==
The Teatro Carlo Felice was built in 1828 and named for the monarch of the then kingdom of Sardinia (which included the present regions of Sardinia, Piedmont, Savoy, and Liguria). The theater was the center of music and social life in the 1800s. On various occasions in the history of the theatre, presentations have been conducted by Mascagni, Richard Strauss, Hindemith and Stravinsky. In 1829 the Genoa Conservatory was established.

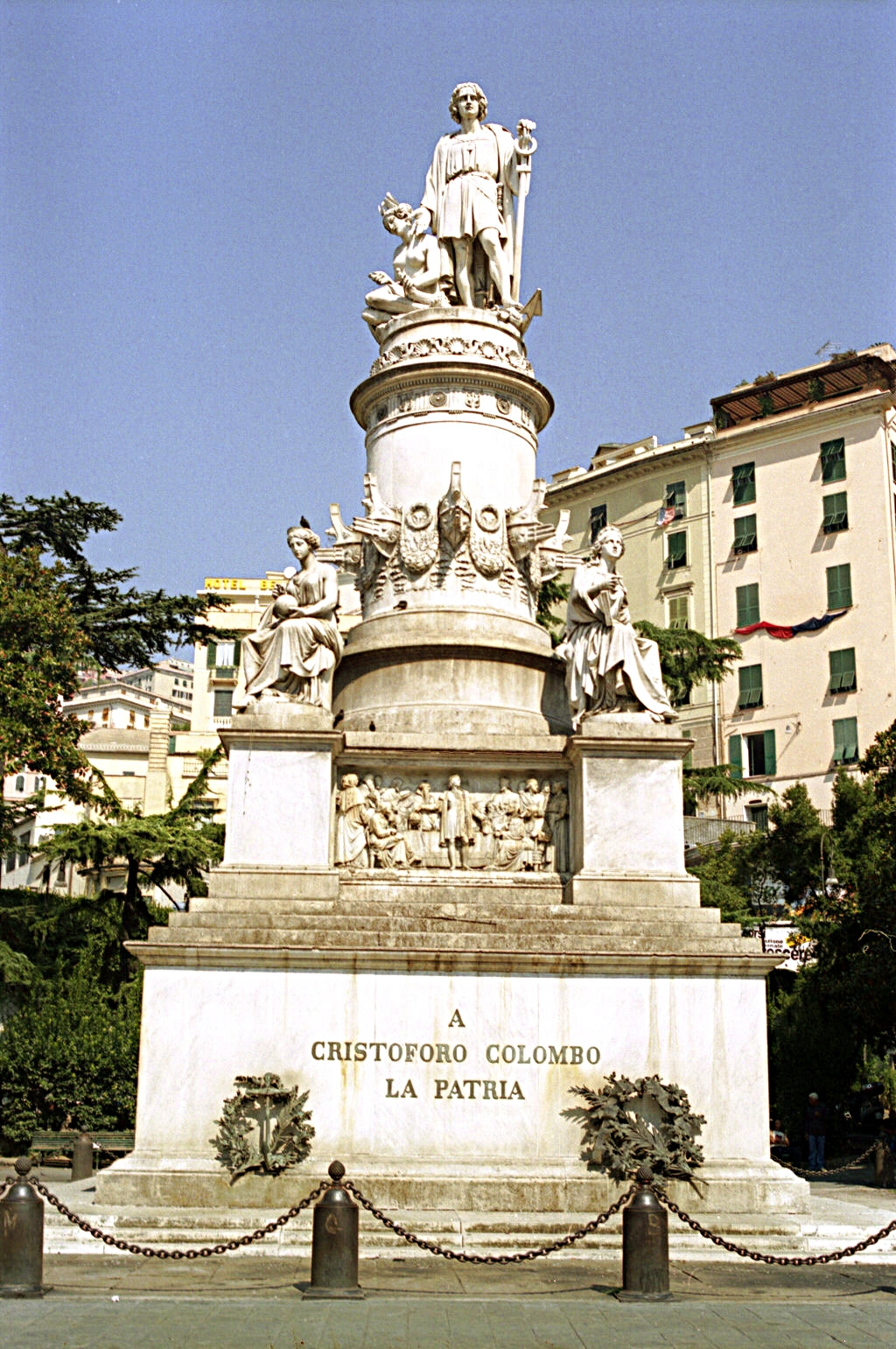
Christopher Columbus monument in Piazza Aquaverde

On the occasion of the Christopher Columbus celebration in 1992, new musical life was given to the area around the old port, including the restoration of the house of Niccolò Paganini. Additionally, the city is the site of the Teatro Gustavo Modena, the only theatre to have survived the bombings of World War II relatively intact. The city is the site of the Niccolò Paganini music conservatory. In the town of Santa Margherita Ligure, the ancient Abbey of Cervara is often the site of chamber music concerts. Giovine Orchestra Genovese, one of the oldest concert societies in Italy, was founded in Genoa in 1912 and has been organizing its concerts at the Teatro Carlo Felice since 1991.

== Folk tradition ==
The city has also produced a well-known form of folk music in trallalero, a polyphonic vocal music, performed by five men, the tenor, baritone, alto, chitarra and bass. Trallalero thrived in Genoa in the early 20th century, especially the 1920s, when there were many clubs like Tugini's in the city.
