= Pina Napolitano =

Italian classical pianist

Pina Napolitano is an Italian classical pianist.

== Biography and career ==
Napolitano was born in Caserta, Italy, and began studying piano at the age of four with Guisi Ambrifi. She later completed two master's degrees in piano performance and in 20th-century piano music with Bruno Mezzena, himself a student of Arturo Benedetti Michelangeli, at the Music Academy of Pescara.

At the same time, Napolitano studied literature and earned undergraduate degrees in Classics and in Oriental European Culture and Languages at the University of Naples "L'Orientale," earning a Ph.D. in Foreign Languages and Literature from the Second University of Rome with a thesis on the poetry of Osip Mandelstam which won the 2011 Italian Slavists’ Association prize. In 2017 a book developed from her thesis, entitled "Osip Mandel’štam: i Quaderni di Mosca", was published by Firenze University Press. She has translated for the first time into Italian the notebooks of Marina Cvetaeva for Voland Edizioni, awarded the 2014 “Premio Italia-Russia. Attraverso i secoli” for best debut translation. Her book of translations of Mandel’štam, Quaderni di Mosca, was published in 2021 with Einaudi Editore, co-curated with Raissa Raskina, and her volume of Cvetaeva's last verses, Marina Cvetaeva: Ultimi Versi, was published by Voland Edizioni. She was the 2021 winner of the "Paul Celan Fellowship for Translators" at the Institute for Human Sciences in Vienna (Institut für die Wissenschaften vom Menschen).

Napolitano has attended master classes with Tibor Égly, Bruno Canino, and Alexander Lonquich, and has studied musical analysis with Giacomo Manzoni and Hugh Collins Rice. She has also participated in master classes at the Ticino Musica Festival, Switzerland, where she has given recitals and served as a teacher.

As a performer, Napolitano has played in many countries, including the United Kingdom, Russia, the United States, Switzerland and Italy, both in solo recitals and as soloist with orchestras performing works such as Liszt's second piano concerto, Bartók's third piano concerto, and Schoenberg's piano concerto.

Napolitano currently teaches piano courses at the Conservatorio Giuseppe Tartini in Trieste and previously taught for one year at the Conservatorio Giovan Battista Martini in Bologna, five years at the Conservatory of Music Fausto Torrefranca in Vibo Valentia, one year at Istituto Statale Superiore di Studi Musicali e Coreutici "Gaetano Braga" in Teramo, as well as three years at Conservatorio Santa Cecilia in Rome.

== Recordings ==
In 2012 Napolitano recorded the complete works for piano of Arnold Schönberg for Odradek Records, as well as the Schoenberg and Bartók 3rd Piano Concerto, together with Atvars Lakstigala and the Liapaja Symphony Orchestra in 2016. In 2018 Napolitano released an album entitled "Brahms the Progressive", after Schoenberg's famous essay of the same name, pairing late works of Brahms to works of the Second Viennese School. Her disc Tempo e Tempi took its title from a poem by Montale and featured the music of Elliott Carter and Jeffrey Mumford alongside Beethoven. She has since published a second volume of Brahms the Progressive, pairing the Webern Concerto with Brahms' Piano Concerto No. 2, together with the Lithuanian National Symphony Orchestra and Modestas Pitrenas.
