= Luisa Sello =

Italian flautist

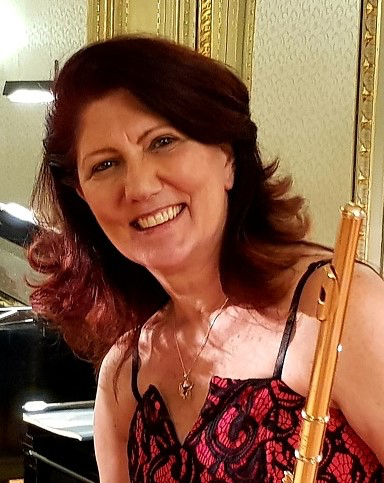

Background information
- Born: Udine, Italy
- Genres: Baroque; classical
- Occupations: Musician, Professor
- Instrument: Flute
- Label: Stradivarius

Luisa Sello OMRI is an Italian classical flautist and teacher.

== Biography ==
Luisa Sello was born in Udine. She completed the Doctor of Musical Arts degree in Italy and Paris where she studied flute as well as Contemporary and Baroque performance practice. She has studied in Paris with Raymond Guiot, at the Accademia Chigiana with Severino Gazzelloni, and at the Académie Internationale of Nice with Alain Marion. She has graduated also in Languages and in Modern Literature.

She spent a brief period of orchestral experience and collaboration with the orchestra of the Teatro alla Scala of Milan under the direction of Riccardo Muti. During her solo career she has played alongside artists such as Alirio Diaz, Bruno Canino, Trevor Pinnock, Philippe Entremont, the Pražák Quartet, Nuovo Quartetto Italiano, the Jess Trio Wien, and has been guest soloist with orchestras such as I Virtuosi Italiani, Concert Verein Wiener Symphoniker, Salzburger Kammerorchester, Slovak Philharmonic, Thailand Symphonic Orchestra, Greater Miami Symphony Orchestra and the Orchestra Milano Classica.

She has worked with numerous contemporary composers (Aldo Clementi, Franco Donatoni, Adriano Guarnieri, Francesco Pennisi, Primo Ramov, Josef Anton Riedl, Salvatore Sciarrino) performing their works for the first time. The Italian composer Valter Sivilotti has dedicated to Luisa Sello the composition "L'incantesimo della luna nuova" for flute and string orchestra.

In 2013 she has been nominated honorary Ambassador of Udine in the world, to represent Friulian culture in Italy and in the world.

Since 2008 she is President of the Association "Gli amici della musica di Udine", the ancient music society of the Friuli Venezia Giulia region founded in 1922.

She was professor of Flute at the Conservatory of Trieste "Giuseppe Tartini" from 1989 to 2020. She is visiting professor at University of Music in Vienna and adjunct professor at the New Bulgarian University of Music in Sofia.

== Honours ==
Knight of the Order of Merit of the Italian Republic – December 2, 2022

== Selected discography ==
- Serenade for Ludwig, Ludwig van Beethoven, Flute Chamber Music, Bruno Canino piano, Myriam Dal Don violin, Giuseppe Mari viola. Dynamic 2020
- All'Italiana! Belcanto for flute and piano, Verdi/Galli, Donizetti, Rossini/Tulou, Rossini/Cottignies, Bellini/Galli, Bruno Canino piano, Stradivarius 2019
- Johann Sebastian Bach, Le Sonate concertanti for flute and piano, Bruno Canino piano, Stradivarius 2018
- Sérénade à deux, Works for flute and guitar, Willy Burkhard, Heitor Villa-Lobos, Astor Piazzolla, Jacques Ibert, Francesco Molino, Franco Margola, Daniele Zanettovich, Ferdinando Carulli, Carla Minen guitar, Stradivarius 2016
- The origin of song, Rossini, Sello, Donizetti, He, Verdi, Chaminade, Bellini, Beethoven, Bruno Canino (piano), Johannes Kropfitsch (piano), Beijing Hongcheng Millennium Culture & Art Co. 2012
- Wolfgang Amadeus Mozart, Integrale dei Concerti K.V. 313-314-315, Romolo Gessi conductor, Orchestra Milano Classica, Stradivarius 2007
- Minus one "Fantasie d'opera", Verdi e Bellini, Johannes Jess Kropfitsch, piano, BMG Ricordi Milano Dischi 2005
- Sonate, Hummel-Martinů-Franck, Johannes Jess Kropfitsch piano, RivoAlto 2000

== Books and essays ==
- 2007 The personification of Krishna and Radha in Giacinto Scelsi's Music in 'The Goddess Awakened' (Ed. Forum, ISBN 978-88-8420-449-3)
- 2005 Fantasie su arie di Verdi e Bellini, Introduzione e revisione di Luisa Sello, Raccolta di fantasie per flauto e pianoforte di differenti gradi di difficoltà per l'uso dei giovani flautisti, Ricordi publisher, Milano
- 1997 Fantasie brillanti per giovani allievi, Melodie favorite di Verdi, Bellini, Rossini, Donizetti, Introduzione e revisione di Luisa Sello, Raccolta di fantasie per flauto di differenti gradi di difficoltà per l’uso dei giovani flautisti, Ricordi publisher, Milano
