= Coldirodi =

Medieval town in Liguria, Italy

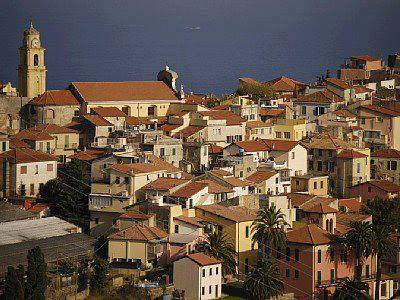

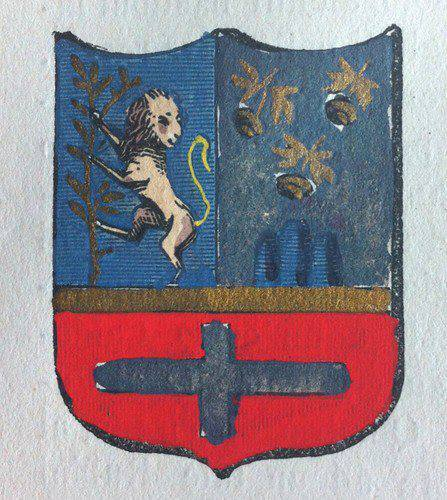
- Coat of arms

- Location in Italy
- Coordinates: 43°48′41″N 7°43′54″E
- Country: Italy
- Region: Liguria
- Province: Imperia (IM)
- Municipality: Sanremo

Population
  - Total: ~3,000
- Time zone: UTC+1 (CET)
  - Summer (DST): UTC+2 (CEST)

Coldirodi is a small medieval town in Liguria, Italy, situated on the hills between Sanremo and Ospedaletti. The town has approximately 3,000 inhabitants and is today a frazione (borough) of the municipality of Sanremo.
