= Stefano Giavazzi =

Italian musician

Stefano Giavazzi (born 16 July 1963) is an Italian pianist.

He completed his musical studies at the Conservatory of Mantua, where he graduated with top marks cum laude. Afterwards he continued his studies under maestro Rinaldo Rossi. Besides his solo repertoire he immediately showed interest in instrumental and vocal chamber music.

He went on to perfect his studies under Jean Micault, György Sándor, Joaquín Achúcarro, B. Bloch, M. Damerini, S. Perticaroli, and with Norbert Brainin and the Trio di Trieste in chamber music.

He has been awarded numerous piano prizes, including 1st prize at the Porrino di Cagliari Competition, 1st prize at the Dasinamov International Competition, 2nd prize at the Rendano Competition in Rome, 3rd prize at the AMA Calabria

International Competition and 3rd prize at the Martha del Vecchio Competition in Genoa.

He has performed for numerous musical associations in Italy (Mantua, Pesaro, Vercelli, Cagliari, Rome, Bologna, Perugia, Savona, Genoa, Ferrara, Milan, Verona, Palermo, Treviso) and abroad (Spain, Greece, Germany, France, Poland, Slovenia). In 2000 he was invited to perform at the only Europiano Congress staged in Italy.

He has played with various orchestras, including the Mantua Chamber Orchestra, the Orchestra of Cagliari, the Genoa Philharmonic, the Costantin Silvestri of Bucharest, the Oradea Philharmonic, Archi Italiani and the Pilsen Radio Orchestra, with which he performed at the Munich Philharmonic.

He has recorded for Italian Radio 3 and Radio Slovena.

He has also recorded Brahms quintet for piano and strings, a CD of unpublished music by Lucio Campiani, a CD for la Bottega Discantica recorded at the Bibiena Theatre with violinist Paolo Ghidoni, W. A. Mozart's Concertos 3 and 4 for piano and orchestra. Recent recordings include the Four Seasons by Astor Piazzolla with the Conservatory of Mantua String Orchestra. In 2008 he is due to record ten Beethoven violin and piano sonatas with violinist Franco Mezzena.

He has played chamber music with artists such as the Tartini Quartet, Bin Huang, Astor Piazzolla, Lorna Windors, Paolo Ghidoni, Giuseppe Ettorre, Rodolfo Bonucci, Gabriella Munari and Franco Mezzena.

He teaches at Mantua's "Lucio Campiani" Conservatory of Music, and is chairman of the Amici del Conservatorio (Friends of the Conservatory) association. Since it was established in 1995 he has been artistic director of the Music's society of Mantua.
