= Pierre Amoyal =

French violinist (born 1949)

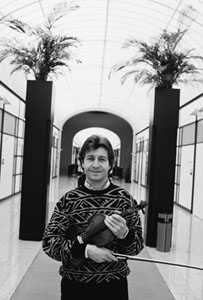
Pierre Amoyal (1992), in the Conservatory of Lausanne.

Dedicated Pierre Amoyal 1976 photo to Southern Africa tour organiser Hans Adler.

Pierre Amoyal (born 22 June 1949 in Paris) is a French violinist and is the artistic director of the Conservatory of Lausanne.

He owns the "Kochanski" Stradivarius of 1717. It was stolen from him in 1987 and recovered in 1991.

== Life and career ==
He studied at the Conservatoire de Paris, graduating at age 12 with a First Prize (in 1961). He then won the Ginette Neveu Prize in 1963, and the Paganini Prize in 1964. At age 17, he traveled to Los Angeles for five years of study with Jascha Heifetz, which culminated in participating in chamber-music recordings with Heifetz. During this time he won the Enescu Prize (1970). He has toured extensively, made numerous recordings and played with many major conductors, such as Sir Georg Solti, with whom he made his European debut at the age of 22, Pierre Boulez, and Herbert von Karajan with the Berlin Philharmonic

He was violin teacher at the Conservatoire de Paris and then at the Conservatory of Lausanne, until June 2014. Then he was teacher at the Mozarteum University of Salzburg, Académie internationale d'été de Nice, and in Japan.

He is the artistic director of the Conservatory of Lausanne. In 2002, he founded the Camerata de Lausanne, a string orchestra. He also created and organised the "violin and piano master-classes" of the Music Academy of Lausanne since 1991.

He was made a Chevalier of Arts and Letters in 1985 and promoted to Knight of the National Order of Merit in 1995. He also received the Prix du rayonnement de la Fondation vaudoise pour la culture in 2002, and the Prix de Lausanne in 2006.

== Teaching ==
Amoyal has held a number of teaching posts, notably:

- Professor at the Conservatoire national supérieur de musique de Paris
- Professor at the Conservatoire de Lausanne and founder of the Camerata de Lausanne
- Professor at the Conservatoire municipal de Maisons-Alfort

Among his Italian pupils at Lausanne was the violinist Alessio Bidoli.
