= Mario Ancillotti =

Italian flutist

Mario Ancillotti (born 1946) is an Italian flutist.

Born in Florence, he studied at the Florence Conservatory. Following stints in orchestras including the RAI Orchestra and the Orchestra dell'Accademia Nazionale di Santa Cecilia , Ancillotti was a full-time chamber musician and solo flutist from 1979. Having released several albums, he was among others noted for Mel Bonis: Complete Music for Flute & Piano together with pianist Eliana Grasso. Ancillotti also organized music festivals and taught at conservatories.
