= Uto Ughi =

Italian violinist and conductor (b.1944)

Maestro Uto Ughi Knight Grand Cross OMRI
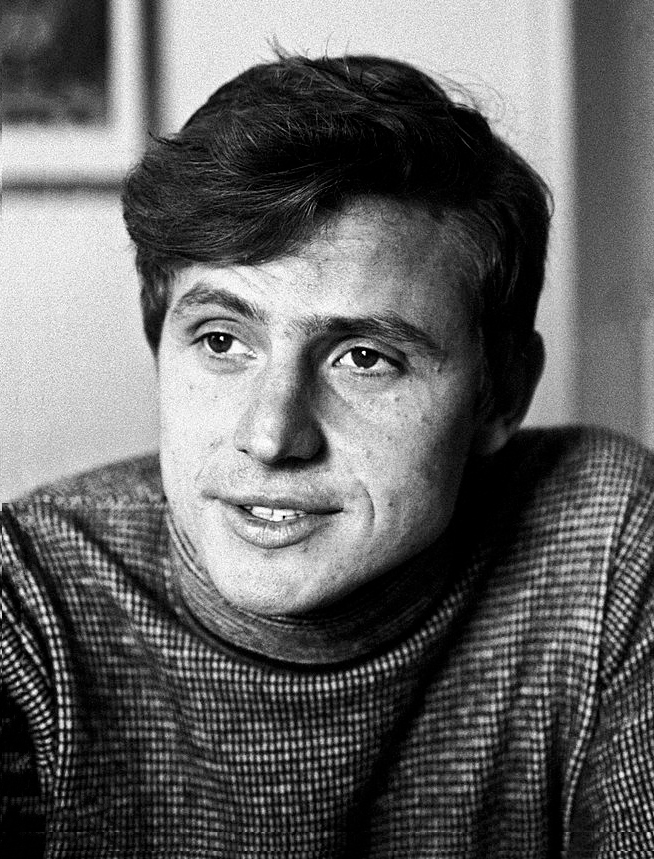
- Uto Ughi in 1970

Background information
- Born: Diodato Emilio Bruto Ughi; January 21, 1944 (age 81); Busto Arsizio, Italy
- Genres: Classical
- Occupation: Violinist
- Instrument: Violin
- Years active: 1951–present
- Labels: RCA Records
- Formerly of: Orchestra dell'Accademia Nazionale di Santa Cecilia
- Website: www.utoughi.com

Bruto "Uto" Ughi Knight Grand Cross OMRI (Italian: [ˈuːto ˈuːɡi]; born 21 January 1944) is an Italian violinist and conductor. He was the music director of the Orchestra dell'Accademia Nazionale di Santa Cecilia between 1987 and 1992. He is considered one of Italy's greatest living violinists and is also active in the promotion of classical music in today's culture.

== Career ==
When he was young he started to play the violin, at only «5 or 6 years» he said, and he made his debut at 7 years old, at the Teatro Lirico di Milano. At 12 years he was considered a mature artist.

He involves himself in many activities to promote music culture. He is the founder of several music festivals, namely "Omaggio a Venezia", "Omaggio a Roma" (1999–2002) and "Uto Ughi per Roma." In tandem with Bruno Tosi, Uto Ughi instituted the musical prize "Una vita per la Musica" ("A life for Music").

On September 4, 1997, he was commissioned Cavaliere della Gran Croce by the Italian President and in 2002 he received a degree honoris causa in Communication studies. He has won various awards, the most prestigious "Una vita per la musica - Leonard Bernstein" (23/6/1997), "Galileo 2000" prize (5/7/2003) and the international prize "Ostia Mare" (8/8/2003).

Ughi has possessed the following fine instruments: the Van Houten-Kreutzer (1701) and Sinsheimer-General Kyd-Perlman (1714) by Antonio Stradivari; and the Kortschak-Wurlitzer (1739), Ole Bull (1744) and Cariplo-Hennel-Rosé (1744) by Giuseppe Guarneri del Gesù.

He received the America Award of the Italy-USA Foundation in 2015.

== Discography ==
=== Studio albums ===
Year	Album details	Notes
1978	Beethoven Complete Violin Sonatas: Re-released: 2019; Label: Sony Classical; Barcode: 0190759562628; Format: CD	Accompanied by Lamar Crowson on the piano
1985	Mozart Complete Violin Concertos: Re-released: 2005; Label: Stradivarius; Barcode: 8011570000781; Format: CD	Performed with Orchestra da Camera di Santa Cecilia
1986	Paganini Violin Concerto No. 1 - Sarasate - Carmen Fantasy: Released: 1986; Label: RCA Red Seal; Format: CD, LP	Performed with Orchestra da Camera di Santa Cecilia
1988	Paganini Violin Concertos No. 2 "La Campanella" and No. 4: Released: 1988; Label: RCA Victor Red Seal; Format: CD	Performed with Chamber Orchestra of Santa Cecilia
1991	Dvořák - Violin Concerto - Romance - Romantic Pieces: Released: 1991; Label: RCA Victor Red Seal; Format: CD	Performed with Philharmonia Orchestra, conducted by Leonard Slatkin
2013	Violino Romantico: Released: May 14, 2013; Label: Sony Classical; Format: CD, digital download	Performed with I Filarmonici di Roma

=== Other albums ===
Year	Album details	Notes
1994	Beethoven - Tchaikovsky violin concertos including : Violin Concerto in D Maj, op.61 Violin Concerto in D Maj, op.35: Released: 1994; Label: Ermitage; Format: CD	Performed with the Radiotelevisione svizzera Orchestra and conducted by Marc Andreae; TV broadcasts respectively from 1970 and 1981, released in CD after digital remastering

== Bibliography ==
- Quel diavolo di un trillo. Note della mia vita (That devil trill. Notes from my life) (2013)
