= Salvatore Accardo =

Italian violinist and conductor

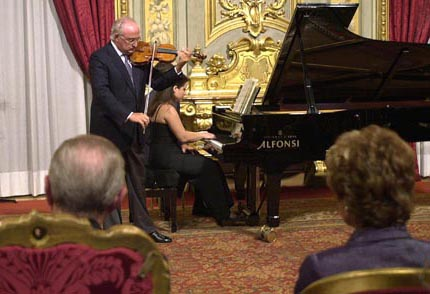
Salvatore Accardo playing during his prize-giving of "Premio Leonardo" and "Qualità Italia", Palazzo del Quirinale, Roma (Italy), 21/9/2000

Salvatore Accardo Knight Grand Cross OMRI (Italian pronunciation: [salvaˈtoːre akˈkardo]; born 26 September 1941 in Turin) is an Italian violinist and conductor, who is known for his performances of the works of Niccolò Paganini.

Accardo owns one Stradivarius violin, the "Hart ex Francescatti" (1727) and had the "Firebird ex Saint-Exupéry" (1718).

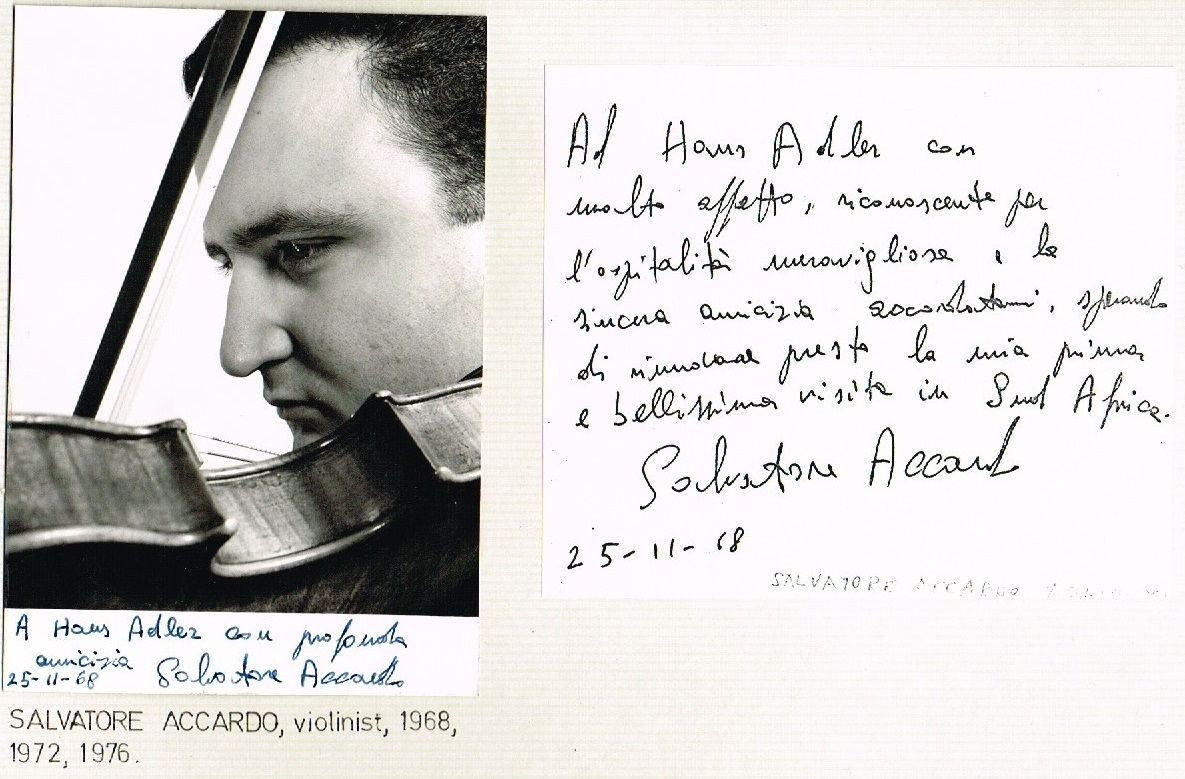
Salvatore Accardo 1968, photo dedicated on first of three acclaimed Southern Africa tours organised by Hans Adler.

== Biography ==
Accardo studied violin in the southern Italian city of Naples in the 1950s. He gave his first professional recital at the age of 13 performing Paganini's Capricci. In 1958 Accardo became the first prize winner of the Paganini Competition in Genoa.

In the 1970s he was a leader of the celebrated Italian chamber orchestra "I Musici" (1972-1977).

After studying in Accademia Musicale Chigiana in Siena, he taught there from 1973 to 1980.

Accardo founded the Accardo Quartet in 1992 and he was one of the founders of the Walter Stauffer Academy in 1986.

He founded the Settimane Musicali Internazionali in Naples and the Cremona String Festival in 1971, and in 1996, he re-founded the Orchestra da Camera Italiana (O.C.I.), whose members are the best pupils of the Walter Stauffer Academy. The most famous pupils are Alessio Bidoli, Franco Mezzena and Anastasiya Petryshak.

He performed the music of Paganini for the soundtrack of the 1989 film Kinski Paganini.

In 2004, he came back to Siena, and now he teaches in Accademia Musicale Chigiana.

== Honours ==
- Italy: Grande Ufficiale dell'Ordine al merito della Repubblica italiana (June 1965)
- Italy: Cavaliere di Gran Croce dell'Ordine al merito della Repubblica italiana (Oct 1982)
- Monaco: Commander of the Order of Cultural Merit (November 1999)

== Discography ==
He has recorded Paganini's 24 Caprices (re-recorded in 1999) for solo violin and was the first violinist to record all six of the violin concerti by Paganini. He has an extensive discography of almost 50 recordings on Philips, DG, EMI, Sony Classical, Foné, Dynamic, and Warner-Fonit. He recorded Rossini String Sonatas, a cherished 1981 issue 6769 024, and an album of classical and contemporary works in 1995 on Paganini's Guarneri del Gesù 1742 violin, Il Cannone. He also recorded with the pianist Bruno Canino the complete sonatas for violin and piano of Mozart.

- Diabolus in Musica, Accardo interpreta Paganini 1996
