= List of people associated with the Royal Academy of Music =

This is a list of people associated with the Royal Academy of Music, London, including principals, alumni, and professors and teachers.

== Principals ==
A complete list of principals.

- William Crotch (1822)
- Cipriani Potter (1832)
- Charles Lucas (1859)
- Sir William Sterndale Bennett (1866)
- Sir George Macfarren (1876)
- Sir Alexander Mackenzie (1888)
- Sir John McEwen (1924)
- Sir Stanley Marchant (1936)
- Sir Reginald Thatcher (1949)
- Sir Thomas Armstrong (1955)
- Sir Anthony Lewis (1968)
- Sir David Lumsden (1982)
- Lynn Harrell (1993)
- Sir Curtis Price (1995)
- Jonathan Freeman-Attwood (2008)

== Alumni ==
More alumni can be found at Category:Alumni of the Royal Academy of Music

- Louis Demetrius Alvanis (pianist)
- William Alwyn (composer)
- Simon Andrews (composer)
- Irvine Arditti (founder of the Arditti Quartet)
- Kit Armstrong (pianist)
- Rosemary Ashe (actress)
- Stephen Ashfield (actor)
- Lena Ashwell (actress)
- Augusta Amherst Austen (organist)
- Bill Bailey (actor)
- Bryan Balkwill (conductor)
- Christopher Ball (clarinettist)
- Sir John Barbirolli (conductor)
- Joseph Barnby (conductor)
- Claire Barnett-Jones (mezzo-soprano)
- Sandro Ivo Bartoli (pianist)
- Louisa Bassano (opera singer)
- Chappell Batchelor (organist)
- Ani Batikian (violinist)
- Sir Arnold Bax (composer)
- Richard Beaudoin (composer)
- Luke Bedford (composer)
- Sir Richard Rodney Bennett (composer)
- Michael Berkeley (composer)
- William Sterndale Bennett (pianist, composer)
- Vanraj Bhatia (film music composer)
- E. Power Biggs (organist)
- Amy Black (mezzo-soprano)
- Henry Blagrove (violinist)
- Julian Bliss (clarinetist)
- Laci Boldemann (composer)
- Jessie Bond (opera singer)
- Nimrod Borenstein (composer)
- Denis Bouriakov (flute)
- York Bowen (composer, pianist)
- Christopher Bowers-Broadbent (organist)
- Kevin Bowyer (organist)
- Douglas Boyd (conductor)
- Caryl Brahms (novelist)
- Dennis Brain (horn player)
- Nicholas Braithwaite (conductor)
- Dudley Bright (trombonist)
- Adrian Brown (conductor)
- Paul Buckmaster (Composer/Arranger/Cellist)
- Susan Bullock (soprano)
- Oliver Butterworth (violinist, educator, administrator)
- Alan Caddy (guitarist with The Tornados)
- Arturo Cardelus (composer, pianist)
- Roy Carter (oboist)
- Doreen Carwithen (composer)
- Eason Chan (non-classical singer-songwriter, baritone-tenor)
- Roger Chase (violist)
- Belle Chen (pianist)
- Karel Mark Chichon (conductor)
- Kristian Chong (pianist)
- Nigel Clarke (composer)
- Rebecca Helferich Clarke (composer)
- Eric Coates (composer)
- Harriet Cohen (pianist)
- Daniel Cohen (conductor)
- William Cole (organist)
- Jacob Collier (singer, multi-instrumentalist, composer)
- Ray Cooper (rock percussionist)
- Garðar Thór Cortes (singer)
- Reginald Crompton (singer)
- Christine Croshaw (pianist)
- Lucy Crowe (singer)
- Colin Currie (percussionist)
- Sir Clifford Curzon (pianist)
- Benjamin Dale (composer)
- Sir John Dankworth (jazz composer)
- Iestyn Davies (countertenor)
- Louis Dowdeswell (trumpeter)
- Mark Eager (conductor The Welsh Sinfonia)
- Florence Easton (soprano and first female fellow of the academy)
- Pip Eastop (horn player)
- Carwyn Ellis (rock musician, composer, arranger)
- Christopher Elton (pianist)
- John Escreet (jazz pianist)
- Richard Farnes (conductor)
- Brian Ferneyhough (composer)
- Andrew Foster-Williams (bass-baritone)
- Herbert Fryer (pianist)
- Melvyn Gale (cellist)
- Rumon Gamba (conductor)
- Edward Gardner (conductor)
- Lesley Garrett (soprano)
- Mark Gasser (pianist)
- Helen George (actress)
- John Georgiadis (violinist, conductor)
- Sir Edward German (composer)
- David Giménez Carreras (conductor)
- Derek Gleeson (conductor, composer, percussionist)
- Dame Evelyn Glennie (percussionist)
- Sylvia Glickman (pianist)
- Ayşedeniz Gökçin (pianist)
- Derrick Goodwin (theatre producer)
- Rachel Gough (bassoonist)
- Thomas Gould (violinist)
- Edward Gregson (former principal of the Royal Northern College of Music)
- Peter Gregson (cellist and composer)
- Benjamin Grosvenor (current student, pianist)
- Alan Hacker (clarinetist)
- Robin Haigh (composer)
- Iain Hamilton (composer)
- Richard Hand (guitarist)
- Caroline Hatchard (soprano)
- Marjorie Hayward (violinist)
- Michael Head (composer, pianist, organist, singer)
- Rachel Helleur (cellist)
- Roy Henderson (baritone)
- Dame Myra Hess (pianist)
- Richard Hickox (conductor)
- Christopher Hobbs (composer)
- Alfred Charles Hobday (violist)
- Derek Holman (composer)
- Sungji Hong (composer)
- Daniel Hope (violinist)
- Amy Horrocks (composer)
- Philip Howard (pianist)
- Monica Huggett (baroque violinist)
- Emanuel Hurwitz (violinist)
- Clelia Iruzun (pianist)
- Joe Jackson (rock/pop singer, composer)
- Ifor James (horn player)
- Isabel Jay (soprano)
- Sir Karl Jenkins (composer)
- Katherine Jenkins (mezzo-soprano)
- Dominic John (pianist)
- Sir Elton John (rock musician)
- Guy Jonson (pianist and teacher)
- Graham Johnson (pianist)
- Aled Jones (singer)
- Daniel Jones (composer)
- Martin Jones (pianist)
- Paul Carey Jones (baritone)
- William Ifor Jones (conductor, organist)
- John Joubert (composer)
- Skaila Kanga (harpist)
- Jozef Kapustka (pianist)
- Miloš Karadaglić (Guitar)
- Peter Katin (pianist)
- Alexander Kelly (pianist)
- Jonathan Kelly (oboist)
- Freddy Kempf (pianist)
- Sooz Kempner (comedian and singer)
- John Kenny (trombonist)
- Myleene Klass (pop singer, broadcaster, pianist)
- Peter Knight (folk musician, violinist/fiddler)
- Rostislav Krimer (pianist, conductor)
- Mina Kubota (composer and pianist)
- John Lanchbery (conductor, arranger)
- John Landor (conductor)
- Philip Langridge (tenor)
- Simmon Latutin (George Cross winner)
- Lewis Henry Lavenu (impresario)
- John Law (jazz pianist/composer)
- Edwin Lemare (organist, composer)
- Annie Lennox (pop singer, flautist)
- Frank Lloyd (horn player)
- Sue Longhurst (actress)
- Dame Felicity Lott (soprano)
- Nicola Loud (violinist)
- David Lumsdaine (composer)
- Dame Moura Lympany (pianist)
- Susanna Mälkki (conductor)
- Daniel Clive McCallum (composer)
- Richard McMahon (pianist)
- Sydney MacEwan (singer)
- Joanna MacGregor (pianist)
- Gareth Malone (choirmaster, TV personality)
- John McLeod (composer)
- Charles Manners (singer, producer)
- Jane Manning (soprano)
- Philip Martin (pianist, composer)
- Cliff Masterson (conductor, composer, orchestrator)
- Tobias Matthay (pianist)
- Denis Matthews (pianist)
- Andrew Matthews-Owen (pianist)
- Nicholas Maw (composer)
- Antoinette Miggiani (opera singer)
- Yurie Miura (pianist)
- Deborah Mollison (composer)
- Walter Nugent Monck (actor, director)
- Gabriela Montero (pianist)
- Ludovic Morlot (conductor)
- Gareth Morris (flautist)
- Geraldine Mucha (composer)
- Máiréad Nesbitt (violinist/fiddler)
- Harry Norris (conductor)
- Chi-chi Nwanoku (double-bassist, founder Chineke! Orchestra)
- Michael Nyman (composer)
- Denise Orme (music hall singer)
- Martin Outram (violist)
- Dee Palmer (keyboardist)
- Roxanna Panufnik (composer)
- Paul Patterson (composer)
- Ashan Pillai (violist)
- Jonathan Pitkin (composer)
- Steve Race (composer, pianist, broadcaster)
- Frederick Ranalow (baritone, actor)
- Sir Simon Rattle (conductor)
- Augusta Read Thomas (composer)
- Hugo Rignold (conductor)
- Henry Brinley Richards (composer)
- Alan Richardson (pianist, composer)
- Edwin Rist (flautist)
- David Robertson (conductor)
- J. G. Robertson (singer, actor)
- Rodolfo Saglimbeni (conductor)
- Charlotte Sainton-Dolby (contralto)
- David Sanger (organist)
- Amandine Savary (pianist)
- Dominic Seldis (double-bassist)
- Mark Shanahan (conductor)
- James Shearman (composer, conductor)
- Philip Sheppard (cellist)
- Derek Simpson (cellist)
- Gustave Slapoffski (conductor)
- Ashley Solomon (recorder player, flautist)
- Jonas Stark (pianist)
- Dr Paul Steinitz (conductor, organist, Bach Scholar)
- Roger Steptoe (pianist)
- Vikki Stone (composer, comedian)
- David Strange (cellist)
- Marius Stravinsky (conductor)
- Yevgeny Sudbin (pianist)
- Luka Šulić (cellist, member of group 2Cellos)
- Sir Arthur Sullivan (composer)
- William Sweeney (composer)
- Sir John Tavener (composer)
- Matthew Taylor (composer)
- Lionel Tertis (violist)
- Toby Thatcher (oboist, conductor)
- Michael Thompson (horn player)
- Julia Thornton (harpist)
- Patsy Toh (pianist)
- Ernest Torrence (baritone)
- Dame Eva Turner (soprano)
- Maxim Vengerov (violinist)
- Christopher Ventris (Tenor)
- Jennifer Vyvyan (soprano)
- Megan Walsh (Soprano)
- Christopher Warren-Green (conductor)
- Silu Wang (pianist)
- Ian "H" Watkins (singer)
- Christopher White (pianist, musicologist)
- E. Florence Whitlock (composer)
- Margaret Jones Wiles (composer, violinist, violist)
- Carol Williams (organist, composer)
- Llyr Williams (pianist)
- Nyle Wolfe (baritone)
- Sir Henry Wood (conductor)
- Henry Wylde (conductor)
- Zi Lan Liao (guzheng player)

== Professors and teachers ==
More former and present teachers can be found at Category:Academics of the Royal Academy of Music

- Thomas Adès (former Britten professor of composition)
- Pierre-Laurent Aimard (Piano – Visiting professor)
- Kenneth Amis (former International Brass Chair)
- Sulamita Aronovsky (piano teacher, founder of London International Piano Competition)
- Walter Bache (former Professor of Piano)
- Simon Bainbridge (former Head of Composition, still on the teaching staff)
- Evelyn Barbirolli (former professor of oboe)
- Sir John Barbirolli (former professor of conducting)
- Django Bates (visiting professor of jazz)
- Joshua Bell (Violin – Visiting Professor)
- Sir Richard Rodney Bennett (Composition – former Visiting Professor)
- William Bennett (Flute)
- James Seymour Brett Film Composer
- Sir Harrison Birtwistle (former professor of composition)
- Nicolas Bochsa (1789–1856) (Harp, founding director)
- Barbara Bonney (Opera – Visiting Professor)
- Christopher Bowers-Broadbent (former Professor of Organ)
- Thomas Brandis (Violin – Visiting Professor)
- Ian Bousfield (Trombone – Visiting Professor)
- Bruce Boyce (former Professor of singing)
- Aubrey Brain (former Professor of Horn)
- Zakhar Bron (former Professor of Violin)
- Aylmer Buesst (conductor)
- Semyon Bychkov (Otto Klemperer Chair of Conducting Studies)
- Colin Carr (Cello)
- Philip Cashian (Head of Composition)
- Simon Carrington (Timpani)
- Carole Cerasi (Harpsichord)
- Robert Cohen (Professor of Cello)
- William Crotch (First principal of the Royal Academy of Music, from 1822)
- William Hayman Cummings
- Laurence Cummings (Head of Historical Performance)
- Maria Curcio (Piano – former Visiting Professor)
- Sir Colin Davis (International Chair of Orchestral Studies)
- Julius Drake (pianist)
- Christopher Elton (Head of Keyboard until 2011)
- Peter Erskine (International Drum Set Consultant)
- Jonathan Freeman-Attwood (Principal)
- Herbert Fryer (pianist)
- John Georgiadis (Director of Orchestral Studies 1989–92)
- Jane Glover (artistic director of opera from 2009)
- Rachel Gough (Bassoon)
- Clio Gould (Violin and ensembles)
- Erich Gruenberg (violinist)
- Alan Hacker (clarinetist)
- Mary Hammond (Head of Musical Theatre)
- Lynn Harrell (former International Head of Cello Studies & Principal)
- Maurice Hasson (Violin)
- Joji Hattori (Violin)
- Marjorie Hayward (Violin)
- Christopher Hogwood (Consultant Visiting Professor)
- Amy Horrocks (composition)
- Stephen Hough (Visiting Professor of Piano)
- James Newton Howard (Visiting professor)
- Yuko Inoue (Viola)
- Guy Jonson (former professor of Piano)
- Frederick Keel (former professor of Singing)
- Stephen Kemp (piano)
- Hu Kun (Violin)
- Anthony Legge (Director of Opera to December 2008)
- Tasmin Little (violin)
- Joanna MacGregor (Piano; Head of Keyboard from 2011)
- Duncan McTier (Head of Double Bass)
- Andrew Marriner (Visiting Professor of Clarinet)
- Sir Peter Maxwell Davies (Composition)
- Colin Metters (Head of Conducting)
- Anne-Sophie Mutter (former Head of International Violin Studies)
- Ann Murray (singing)
- Owen Murray (Head of Classical Accordion)
- Clarence Myerscough (Violin, former Head of Strings)
- Pascal Nemirovski (Piano)
- Chi-chi Nwanoku (Professor, Historical Double-Bass)
- Charles Oberthür (First Professor of Harp, 1861)
- James O'Donell (Professor of organ)
- Dennis O'Neill (Visiting Professor of Opera)
- Martin Outram (Viola)
- Paul Patterson (Manson Chair of Composition)
- György Pauk (Ede Zathureczky Professor of Violin)
- Ashan Pillai (viola)
- Antony Pitts (composer, conductor, former Senior Lecturer in Creative Technology)
- Gerard Presencer (former Head of Jazz)
- Curtis Price (former Principal)
- David Pyatt (Horn – Visiting Professor)
- Priaulx Rainier, former professor of Composition
- Alan Richardson (Piano)
- Martin Roscoe (Piano)
- Patrick Russill (Head of Choral Conducting)
- Amandine Savary (Piano, Chamber Music)
- Mark Shanahan (Conducting – former Visiting Professor)
- Paul Silverthorne (viola)
- David Strange (Cello, Head of Strings)
- Yevgeny Sudbin (piano, visiting professor)
- Jeremy Summerly (Sterndale Bennett Lecturer in Music)
- Robert Tear (Opera – Visiting Professor)
- Michael Thompson (Horn)
- Patsy Toh (Piano)
- Eva Turner (former professor of Singing)
- Maxim Vengerov (Violin)
- Derek Watkins (Professor of Trumpet and commercial brass consultant)
- Richard Watkins (Horn)
- James Watson (Trumpet, former Head of Brass)
- Mark Wildman (Head of Vocal Studies)
- John Williams (Guitar – Visiting Professor)

== Honours ==
=== Past and present Honorary Members of the Royal Academy of Music (Hon RAM) ===
- The Honorary Membership of the Royal Academy of Music (Hon RAM) is awarded to up to 300 distinguished musicians who did not attend the Royal Academy of Music (at college level).
- Claudio Abbado (1982)
- Jenny Abramsky (2002)
- Salvatore Accardo (1988)
- John Adams (2003)
- Pierre-Laurent Aimard (2006)
- Sir Thomas Allen (1988)
- Géza Anda (1970)
- Maurice Andre (1984)
- Martha Argerich (2001)
- Richard Armstrong (1984)
- Vladimir Ashkenazy (1972)
- Milton Babbitt (2005)
- Norman Bailey (1981)
- Simon Bainbridge (2002)
- Daniel Barenboim (1975)
- Cecilia Bartoli (1999)
- Yuri Bashmet (1989)
- Django Bates (2000)
- Joshua Bell (2000)
- George Benjamin (2003)
- William Bennett (1988)
- Teresa Berganza (2002)
- Luciano Berio (1988)
- Mary Berry (1994)
- Neil Black (1971)
- Barbara Bonney (2001)
- Ian Bostridge (2002)
- Pierre Boulez (1967)
- Ian Bousfield (2002)
- Thomas Brandis (2005)
- Julian Bream (1966)
- Alfred Brendel (1972)
- Dudley Bright (2003)
- Iona Brown (1996)
- Frans Brüggen (2001)
- David Cairns (2000)
- Colin Carr (2001)
- José Carreras (1990)
- Elliott Carter (1990)
- John Carol Case (1976)
- Riccardo Chailly (1996)
- William Christie (2003)
- Kyung-wha Chung (1991)
- Nicholas Cleobury (1985)
- Van Cliburn (1978)
- Robert Cohen (2009)
- Imogen Cooper (1997)
- John Copley (1999)
- Gordon Crosse (1980)
- Laurence Cummings (2005)
- Paul Daniel (1999)
- Sir Andrew Davis (1991)
- Sir Colin Davis (1962)
- Sir Peter Maxwell Davies (1978)
- Winton Dean (1971)
- Plácido Domingo (2000)
- Antal Doráti (1983)
- Laurence Dreyfus (1995)
- Gustavo Dudamel (2012)
- Henri Dutilleux (1996)
- Sir Mark Elder (1984)
- Margaret Eliot (1960)
- Paul Esswood (1990)
- Dietrich Fischer-Dieskau (1970)
- Renée Fleming (2000)
- Peter Fletcher (1966)
- Jonathan Freeman-Attwood (1997)
- Louis Frémaux (1978)
- Peter Gabriel (2009)
- Sir James Galway (1999)
- Sir John Eliot Gardiner (1992)
- John Gardner (1959)
- Nicolai Gedda (1994)
- Valery Gergiev (2000)
- Kenneth Gilbert (1988)
- Emil Gilels
- John Gilhooly (2006)
- Carlo Maria Giulini (1972)
- Alexander Goehr (1974)
- Matthias Goerne (2001)
- Szymon Goldberg (1970)
- Clio Gould (1999)
- Erich Gruenberg (1990)
- Ida Haendel (1982)
- Emmanuelle Haïm (2007)
- Bernard Haitink (1973)
- Derek Hammond-Stroud (1976)
- Thomas Hampson (1996)
- Hakan Hardenberger (1992)
- George Lascelles, 7th Earl of Harewood (1983)
- Nikolaus Harnoncourt (1996)
- Heather Harper (1972)
- Lynn Harrell (1987)
- Simon Harris (1979)
- Jonathan Harvey (2001)
- Maurice Hasson (1989)
- Joji Hattori (2003)
- Thomas Hemsley (1974)
- Hans Werner Henze (1975)
- Raimund Herincx (1972)
- Adolph Herseth (2001)
- Christopher Hogwood (1995)
- Heinz Holliger (1975)
- Sir Anthony Hopkins (1979)
- Vladimir Horowitz (1972)
- Stephen Hough (2003)
- James Newton Howard (2008)
- Elgar Howarth (1991)
- Hu Kun (2002)
- Peter Hurford (1981)
- George Hurst (1984)
- John Ireland (composer)
- Steven Isserlis (1995)
- Gundula Janowitz (2000)
- Mariss Jansons (1999)
- Sir Elton John (1997), attended as junior exhibitioner
- Dame Gwyneth Jones (1980)
- Simon Keenlyside (2007)
- Nicholas Kenyon (2005)
- Joseph Kerman (1972)
- Thea King (1998)
- Angelika Kirchschlager (2009)
- Dame Emma Kirkby (1999)
- Evgeny Kissin (2005)
- Otto Klemperer
- Oliver Knussen (1995)
- Ton Koopman (1990)
- Gidon Kremer (1999)
- Piers Lane (1994)
- Lang Lang (2012)
- Alicia de Larrocha (1987)
- Philip Ledger (1984)
- Anthony Legge (2007)
- Karl Leister (1987)
- Gustav Leonhardt (2000)
- Raymond Leppard (1978)
- György Ligeti (1992)
- John Lill (1986)
- Magnus Lindberg (2001)
- Robert Lloyd (1999)
- James Lockhart (1993)
- Christa Ludwig (2000)
- Sir David Lumsden (1978)
- Radu Lupu (2000)
- Benjamin Luxon (1980)
- William Lyne (1999)
- Yo-Yo Ma (1992)
- Julia Mackenzie (2005)
- Sir Charles Mackerras (1969)
- James MacMillan (2007)
- Andrew Marriner (1994)
- Sir Neville Marriner (1970)
- Wynton Marsalis (1996)
- Sir George Martin (1999)
- Malcolm Martineau (1998)
- Valerie Masterson (1994)
- Kurt Masur (2001)
- John McCabe (1985)
- Sir Paul McCartney (2008)
- Duncan McTier (1998)
- Colin Metters (1995)
- Felix Mendelssohn (1843)
- Rodney Milnes (2002)
- Yvonne Minton (1975)
- Donald Mitchell (1992)
- Ignaz Moscheles (1822)
- Maurice Murphy (2008)
- Ann Murray (1998)
- Owen Murray (1993)
- Thea Musgrave (1976)
- Riccardo Muti (1981)
- Anne-Sophie Mutter (1986)
- Kent Nagano (1998)
- Martin Neary (1988)
- Birgit Nilsson (1973)
- Jessye Norman (1987)
- Roger Norrington (1988)
- John Orford (1989)
- Robin Orr (1966)
- Antonio Pappano (2007)
- Ian Partridge (1996)
- Győrgy Pauk (1990)
- Antony Pay (1986)
- Krzysztof Penderecki (1974)
- Murray Perahia (1985)
- Itzhak Perlman (1993)
- Trevor Pinnock (1984)
- Rachel Podger (2005)
- André Previn (1977)
- Curtis Price (1993)
- Dame Margaret Price (1988)
- Ruggiero Ricci (1983)
- H. C. Robbins Landon (1998)
- Winifred Roberts (1983)
- Christopher Robinson (1980)
- Mstislav Rostropovich
- Gennadi Rozhdestvensky (1979)
- Patrick Russill (1993)
- Esa-Pekka Salonen (2003)
- Kurt Sanderling (2000)
- András Schiff (1989)
- Peter Schreier (2000)
- Dame Elisabeth Schwarzkopf (1975)
- John Scott (1990)
- John Shirley-Quirk (1972)
- Leonard Slatkin (1993)
- Philip Smith (2005)
- Nicholas Snowman (1999)
- Elisabeth Soderstrom (1982)
- Stephen Sondheim (1992)
- John Stainer (1962)
- Simon Standage (2009)
- Janos Starker (1980)
- Karlheinz Stockhausen (1987)
- Jeremy Summerly (2006)
- Dame Joan Sutherland (1979)
- Henryk Szeryng (1969)
- Richard Taruskin (2001)
- Eric Taylor (1976)
- Dame Kiri Te Kanawa (2003)
- Robert Tear (1978)
- Bryn Terfel (2000)
- Yan Pascal Tortelier (2002)
- Stan Tracey (1984)
- Barry Tuckwell (1966)
- John Tusa (1999)
- Dame Mitsuko Uchida (2009)
- Richard van Allan (1987)
- Tamás Vásáry (1992)
- Josephine Veasey (1972)
- Jon Vickers (1977)
- Roger Vignoles (1984)
- Anne Sofie von Otter (2002)
- Gillian Weir (1989)
- Judith Weir (1997)
- Kenny Wheeler (2009)
- Jonathan Willcocks (1996)
- John Williams (guitarist) (1989)
- John Williams (composer) (1995)
- David Willcocks (1965)
- Arthur Wills (1974)
- Victoria Wood (2006)
- Rae Woodland (1983)
- Denis Wright (1966)
- Pinchas Zukerman (1976)

=== Past and present Fellows of the Royal Academy of Music (FRAM) ===
A more comprehensive list is at Category:Fellows of the Royal Academy of Music

- Irvine Arditti (1984)
- Stephen Ashfield (2018)
- Sir Richard Rodney Bennett (1963)
- Alan Bush (1938)
- Christopher Elton (1982)
- Rachel Gough (2002)
- Dame Evelyn Glennie (1992)
- Alan Ray Hacker (1958) (clarinetist)
- Amy Horrocks (1895)
- Freddie Kempf (2005)
- Annie Lennox (1997)
- Dame Felicity Lott (1986)
- Susanna Mälkki (2010)
- Philip Martin (1988)
- Odaline de la Martinez (1990)
- Dee Palmer (1994)
- Frederick Ranalow
- Sir Simon Rattle (1984)

=== Honorary Doctorates (Hon DMus) ===
- Sir Thomas Allen (2014, Honorary Doctorate of the University of London)
- Daniel Barenboim (2010, Honorary Doctorate of the University of London)
- Pierre Boulez (2010, Honorary Doctorate of the University of London)
- Sir Colin Davis (2002, Honorary Doctorate of the University of London)
- Sir Mark Elder (2012, Honorary Doctorate of the University of London)
- Sir Elton John (2002, Honorary Doctorate of the University of London)
- Sir Ralph Kohn (2014, Honorary Doctorate of the University of London)
- Sir Charles Mackerras (2005, Honorary Doctorate of the University of London)
- Sir George Martin (2011, Honorary Doctorate of the University of London)
- Sir Peter Maxwell Davies (2006, Honorary Doctorate of the University of London)
- Sir Simon Rattle (2011, Honorary Doctorate of the University of London)
- Gennady Rozhdestvensky (2013, Honorary Doctorate of the University of London)
- Stephen Sondheim (2010, Honorary Doctorate of the University of London)

=== Past and present Honorary Fellows of the Royal Academy of Music (Hon FRAM) ===
- The Duchess of Gloucester
- Dame Emma Kirkby
- Dame Felicity Lott
- Baron Albert Profumo KC
- Ian Ritchie (2018)

=== Honorary Associate of the Royal Academy of Music (Hon ARAM) ===
- Simon Shaw-Miller (art and music historian) (2007)
- Peter Stark
- Denis Wright (1965)
