= Wildman =

Wildman may refer to:

== People ==
=== Surname ===
- Alexina Maude Wildman (1867–1896), Australian journalist
- Andrew Wildman, British artist
- Bud Wildman (born 1946), Canadian politician
- Don Wildman (born 1961), American television show host
- Eric A. Wildman (1921–1990), English corporal punishment advocate
- Frank Wildman (1908–1994), English footballer
- George Wildman (1927–2016), American cartoonist
- Henry Wildman (1838–?), convict transported to Australia whose false claims of having found gold led to an expedition to the area
- Herbert Wildman (1912–1989), American water polo goalkeeper in the 1932 and 1936 Olympics
- John Wildman (actor) (born 1960), Canadian actor
- John Wildman (c. 1621–1693), English politician and soldier
- Mark Wildman (singer), English bass and professor at the Royal Academy of Music
- Mark Wildman (born 1936), English snooker and pool commentator and retired snooker and English billiards player
- James Wildman (1747–1816), British politician and Member of Parliament
- James Beckford Wildman (1789–1867), English politician and Jamaican plantation owner
- Leslie Wildman, American composer
- Melanie Wildman (born 1974), Canadian business woman, entrepreneur and beauty pageant winner
- Michael Wildman, British actor
- Peter Wildman (born 1950), Canadian actor and comic
- Rounsevelle Wildman (1864–1901), American writer and U.S. consul in Hong Kong
- Sam Wildman (1912–2004), Professor of Biology at the University of California, Los Angeles
- Sarah Wildman, American journalist and non-fiction writer
- Scott Wildman (born 1951), California State Assemblyman from 1996 to 2000
- Stephen Wildman (born 1951), Professor of the History of Art at the University of Lancaster
- Steven S. Wildman, American communications academic and researcher
- Thomas Wildman (1787–1859), British Army colonel, draftsman and landowner
- Valerie Wildman, American actress
- Wesley Wildman (born 1961), Australian-American philosopher, theologian, ethicist and academic
- William Wildman (footballer) (1883–?), English footballer
- William Beauchamp Wildman (1852–1922), teacher and historian
- Zalmon Wildman (1775–1835), American politician
- Benjamin Wildman-Tobriner (born 1984), American 2008 Gold Medal Olympic swimmer and former world record holder

=== Nicknames ===
- Adrian "Wildman" Cenni, American stuntman
- Steve Brill (born 1949), American foraging expert known as "Wildman"
- Wildman Steve (1925–2004), American comic entertainer, radio personality, promoter, MC and recording artist
- Wildman Whitehouse (1816–1890), English surgeon and unsuccessful chief electrician of the transatlantic telegraph cable for the Atlantic Telegraph Company

== Fictional characters ==
- Sir Lawrence (Larry) Wildman, in the 1987 film Wall Street
- Naomi Wildman, on the television series Star Trek: Voyager
- Samantha Wildman, on Star Trek: Voyager

== Other uses ==
- Wildman River, Northern Territory, Australia
- Wild man, a prominent Mardi Gras Indians character who usually carries a symbolic weapon

== See also ==
- Rev. Donald Wildmon
- Wild man
