= Yorkshire Imperial Band =

Brass band from West Yorkshire, England

- Brass Band
- The current Yorkshire Imperial Band logo.
- Short name: Yorkshire Imps
- Former name: Yorkshire Imperial Metals Band, IMI Yorkshire Imperial Band, Yorkshire Imperial David Urquhart Travel Band, DUT Yorkshire Imperial Band, and Yorkshire Imperial Urquhart Travel Band.
- Founded: 1936 (90 years ago)
- Location: Wakefield, West Yorkshire, England
- Website: yorkshireimps.co.uk

The Yorkshire Imperial Band, nicknamed the Yorkshire Imps, is a brass band from West Yorkshire, England, conducted by Ian McElligott. The band is listed as one of the top 10 bands of the second half of the 20th century in Dr Roy Newsome’s ‘The Modern Brass Band’.

Past players in the band include Cornet artist Philip McCann, Trombone virtuoso Ian Bousfield, and Euphonium artists Robert Childs, and Nicholas Childs.

The band have played at The Royal Albert Hall, Wembley Stadium and the World Music Festival in Kerkrade and have shared the concert stage with musicians Diana Ross, Eric Clapton, Barry Manilow and Shirley Bassey. In 2019 the band performed at BBC Countryfile Live which took place at Castle Howard, York.

== History ==
The Yorkshire Imperial Band was originally founded in 1936 as the Yorkshire Copper Works Band by the Yorkshire Copper Works company based in Stourton, Leeds. Kenneth Fraser was the band's first president. The band's first set of instruments, it is said, cost the company £2,500, but that was not their only expense because they also provided each member with two uniforms – one for the summer and one for the winter. Due to an industrial merger in 1958, between Yorkshire Imperial Metals and ICI Metals, the name was changed to The Band of Yorkshire Imperial Metals, but this was altered again in 1980 to IMI Yorkshire Imperial Band.

They had successive wins at Belle Vue – in 1970 under the direction of Trevor Walmsley DFC playing Herbert Howell's test piece 'Pageantry', and then again in 1971 playing Eric Ball's test piece 'Festival Music'. In 1978, under the direction of Denis Carr, they won their first national title playing 'Checkmate' by Sir Arthur Bliss.

Between 1970 and 1980 they had four major victories (National Champions 1978, and British Open Champions), Yorkshire area champions five times out of seven along with their triple success at the Edinburgh Festival Invitation Contest. In 1981 they won the Yorkshire Area Contest at St. George's Hall, Bradford.

When the Rothwell Band and Yorkshire Imperial Band merged in 1999, the name changed again to incorporate the name of their new sponsors and became the DUT Yorkshire Imperial Rothwell Band. In 2002 the name was revised to the shorter and more recognisable Yorkshire Imperial Urquhart Travel Band. The Rothwell Temperance Band was founded in 1881, when the drinkers and non-drinkers of the Rothwell Model Band, established in 1841 or earlier, divided to form two bands, the other being the Rothwell Old Band. In 1999 it was renamed the Wallace Arnold (Rothwell) Band, reflecting sponsorship by coach tour operator Wallace Arnold. The then "B" band retained the name Rothwell Temperance Band.

The band has added various titles including several Yorkshire Area titles, Brass in Concert Champions in 1995 and in 2005 and 2024 the band were crowned "First Section National Champions of Great Britain" making the Imps the first band ever to win both a National and Lower Section National title.

During its long history the band has been conducted by a number of well known names from the brass band world which included George Hespe, William Halliwell, H. Tompkins, A. H. Whitehead, B. Burns, Trevor Walmsley, Denis Carr, Peter Kitson, John Pryce Jones, James Scott and Ray Farr.. Imps is currently under the baton of Ian McElligott, who is the musical director of the band while also working as musical consultant for Brighouse & Rastrick Band.

As of November 2024 the band was ranked 13th in Yorkshire and 128th in the world in listings at the brass band website 4barsrest.com, and also ranked 97th in the world in the listings of BrassStats.com.

== Recordings ==
The Yorkshire Imperial Band have a long history of successful recording contracts, dating as far back as the 1967 CBS Yorkshire Brass. Their most recent recording was released in May 2023 and is titled " Simply Imps" and includes titles such as Shostakovich's "Festive Overture", Andrew LLoyd Webber's "Don’t Cry For Me Argentina", and The Mamas & the Papas "California Dreamin’".

Some of the albums the band are included in are shown in the table below.

Year	Album name	Publisher	Notes
2023	Simply Imps		Yorkshire Imperial Band
2015	Christmas with the Yorkshire Imps	CRS Records	The People's Friend
2006	In Shining Armour	Doyen	Brett Baker and Paul Woodward (Trombones) with Yorkshire Imperial Urquhart Travel Band MD: Chris Houlding
2006	Beyond the Stars II	Chameleon Arts	Yorkshire Imperial Urquhart Travel Band MD: Roy Curran
2004	Joy to the World	Chameleon Arts	Yorkshire Imperial Urquhart Travel Band with the Romsey Choral Society and Portsmouth Festival Choir
2003	Brass in Concert Live 2003	Doyen: DOYCD172	Various (inc Yorkshire Imperial Urquhart Travel Band) MD: David Evans
2003	Now that's what I call Brass!	World of Brass: CD-WOB102	Various (inc Yorkshire Imperial Urquhart Travel Band)
2002	Imps in Concert	Doyen: DOYCD145	Yorkshire Imperial Urquhart Travel Band MD: David Evans
2000	Brass from the New World	World of Brass	Various (inc Yorkshire Imperial Band) MD: David Hirst
1999	Best of Brass – Popular Favourites Performed By The Greatest Brass Bands	Castle Music Ltd	Various (inc The Band of the Yorkshire Imperial Metals)
1998	Beyond the Stars	Chameleon Arts 101CAMCD	DUT Yorkshire Imperial Rothwell Band MD: Simon Godfrey Wood
1998	Virtuosity – Russel Gray	Belburn Music Ltd	Rothwell Band (Leeds) MD: Thomas Wyss & Simon Wood
1996	Galaxies	Kirklees, KRCD1027	IMI Yorkshire Imperial Band MD: Ray Farr
1996	Far and Away	Polyphonic, CPRL077D	DUT Yorkshire Imperial Band MD: Alan Exley
1993	Endeavor	Doyen: DOYCD006	IMI Yorkshire Imperial Band MD: David Hirst
1993	Music for Brass: James Curnow	World of Brass	Various (inc Yorkshire Imperial Band)
1992	The Best of Listen to the Band – Vol 1	Doyen: DOYCD016	Various (inc Yorkshire Imperial Band) MD: David Hirst
1992	Versatile Virtuoso – Ian Bousfield	Doyen: DOYCD014	IMI Yorkshire Imperial Band MD: Eric Crees
1991	Space Movements	De Haske Records	IMI Yorkshire Imperial Band MD: David Hirst
1989	Pageantry	Polyphonic	IMI Yorkshire Imperial Band MD: James Scott
1988	Sounds of the White Rose	Kirklees, KR1002	DUT Yorkshire Imperial Band MD: James Scott & Gary Cutt
1987	British Bandsman Centenary Concert	Chandos CHAN4513	IMI Yorkshire Imperial Band MD: Harry Mortimer & James Scott
1986	Blue Rondo à la Turk	Kirklees, KRCD1014	DUT Yorkshire Imperial Band MD: Ray Farr
1984	Yorkshire Imperial Band Play the Music of Noel Gay	Noal Gay Music Ltd	The Yorkshire Imperial Band MD: Ray Farr
1982	Concerto	Polyphonic	The Yorkshire Imperial Band Guest Soloist: Maurice Murphy Conducted by John Pryce-Jones & Peter Kitson
1980	Mr Smith's Perennial Favourites	Polyphonic	The Yorkshire Imperial Band MD: Major Peter Parkes
1979	Checkmate	Two-Ten-Records	The Band of Yorkshire Imperial Metals MD: Denis Carr
1978	The Band of Yorkshire Imperial Metals	Two-Ten-Records	The Band of Yorkshire Imperial Metals MD: Denis Carr
1978	20 Brass Band Favourites	Pickwick Records	Various (inc The Yorkshire Imperial Band) MD: Trevor Walmsley DFC
1976	Golden Hour of TOP BRASS	Golden Hour Recordings	Various Bands including the Band of Yorkshire Imperial Metals MD: Trevor Walmsley DFC
1976	Superstar Brass	Pye Records	The Band of Yorkshire Imperial Metals MD: Trevor Walmsley DFC
1975	Brass International	Pye Records	The Band of Yorkshire Imperial Metals MD: Trevor Walmsley DFC
1974	The Sound of Yorkshire Imperial	Silverline Records	The Band of Yorkshire Imperial Metals MD: Trevor Walmsley DFC
1973	Yorkshire Brass	Embassy / CBS Records	The Band of Yorkshire Imperial Metals MD: Trevor Walmsley DFC
1973	Sound Of Brass Series Volume 6	Decca Records Ltd	The Band of Yorkshire Imperial Metals MD: Trevor Walmsley DFC
1972	Sound Of Brass Series Volume 2	Decca Records Ltd	Yorkshire Imperial Metals Band MD: Trevor Walmsley DFC
1970	Imperial Brass	Marble Arch Records	The Band of Yorkshire Imperial Metals MD: Trevor Walmsley DFC
1967	Yorkshire Brass	CBS (USA), Inc.	Yorkshire Imperial Metals Band MD: Trevor Walmsley DFC

== Contesting honours ==
National Championships of Great Britain – Winners 1978, Runners-up 1976

National Championships of Great Britain (First Section) – Winners 2005

British Open Brass Band Championships – 4 wins: 1970, 1971, 1980, 1997* (Grand Shield). Runners-up 1666

Yorkshire Area Regional Championships – 10 wins: 1968, 1970, 1975, 1976, 1977, 1980, 1981, 1988, 1993, 2024 (1st section)

Brass in Concert Championships – Winners 1995

BBC Band of the Year – Winners 1981

Granada Band of the Year – Runners-up: 1985, 1986

*As Rothwell Band
