= William Wildman =

William Wildman may refer to:

- William Wildman (footballer), English footballer
- William Beauchamp Wildman, teacher and historian
