= Ian Bousfield =

English trombonist (born 1964)

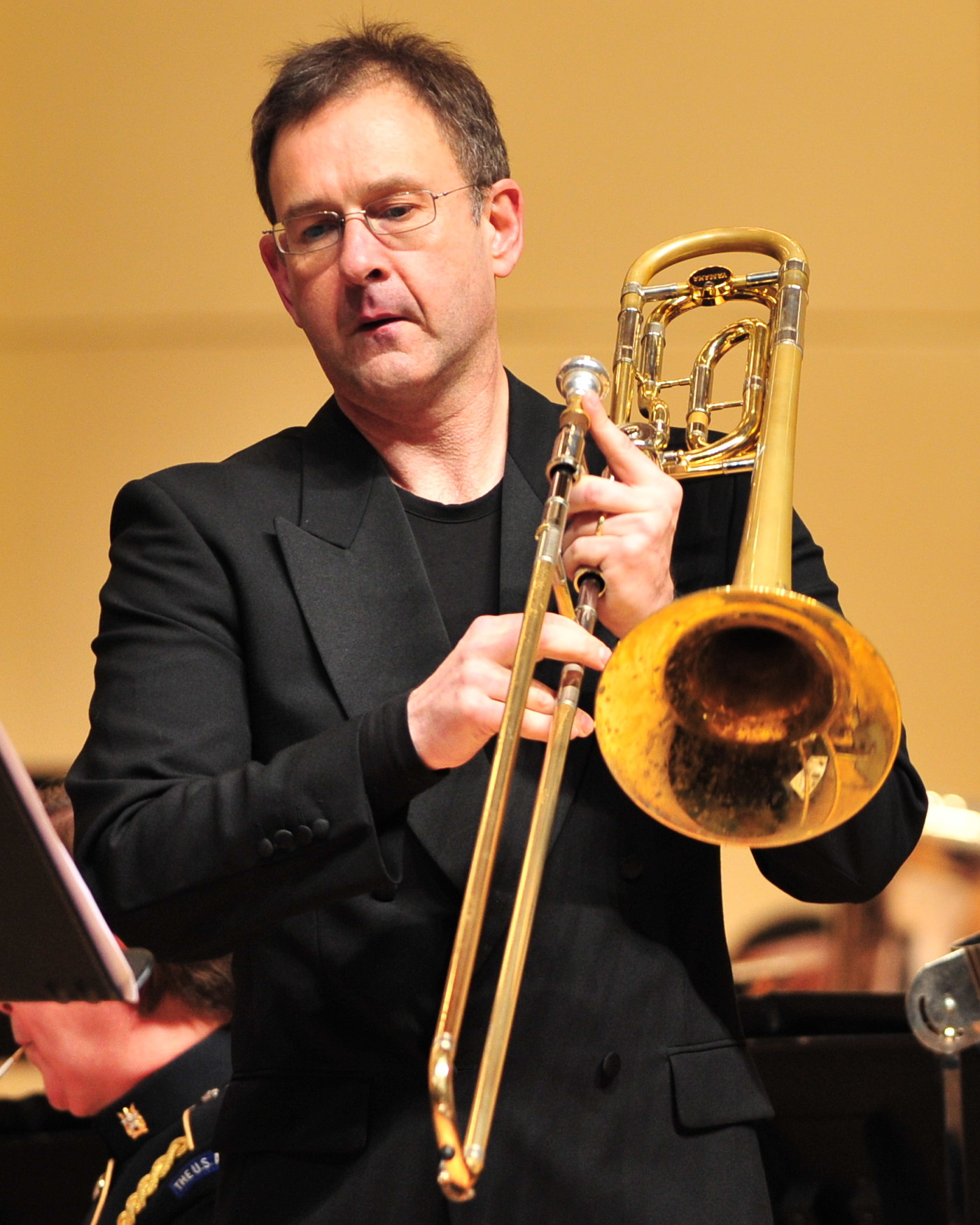
- Ian Bousfield in 2012

Background information
- Born: 16 February 1964 (age 62); York, England
- Genre: Classical
- Instrument: Trombone
- Website: www.ianbousfield.com

Ian Bousfield (born 16 February 1964) is an English trombonist who has held positions as principal trombone with the Vienna Philharmonic Orchestra, the London Symphony Orchestra and the Hallé Orchestra. Also a pedagogue, Bousfield is an instructor in the music division at the Hochschule der Künste in Bern, Switzerland.

== Early life and education ==
Bousfield was born in York, England on 16 February 1964, and began playing the trombone at the age of seven, taught by his father. He became principal trombonist in the National Youth Brass Band at age 13, and for four years, principal with the Yorkshire Imperial Band, during which time they won the British, National and Yorkshire championships.

In 1979, Bousfield became the youngest winner ever of the Shell/London Symphony Orchestra Music Scholarship.

== Orchestral playing ==
In 1980 Bousfield joined the European Union Youth Orchestra where he spent two years under Claudio Abbado. He spent only six months studying at the Guildhall School of Music and Drama before he was appointed principal trombone at the Hallé Orchestra in March 1983.

In 1988 at the age of 24, Bousfield was appointed principal trombonist of the London Symphony Orchestra, taking over from the veteran Denis Wick. At the time, Denis Wick said, "he is an extremely accomplished player and what he is short on by way of experience, if he is, he is bright enough to get together very quickly."

In 1999 he won an audition for the principal trombone position with the Vienna State Opera/Vienna Philharmonic, where he performed until leaving in 2012 to devote more time to his teaching and solo careers.

== Teaching ==
Bousfield was appointed professor of trombone at the Royal Academy of Music in 1992, and has since been awarded honorary membership. In 2011, he began teaching at the Hochschule der Künste in Bern, Switzerland.

His book Unlocking The Trombone Code, which describes Bousfield's pedagogical ideas and methods, has been published by Warwick Music.

== Solo performances ==
In 1984 Bousfield performed Elgar Howarth's trombone concerto with the Yorkshire Imperial Band for broadcast on BBC Radio 3. And in 1985 he played the first British performance of Gunther Schuller's trombone concerto, Eine kleine Posaunenmusik, with the Halle Orchestra conducted by the composer.

In March 2007 Bousfield gave the premiere of Stargazer, a concerto for trombone and orchestra by British composer Jonathan Dove, with the London Symphony Orchestra conducted by Michael Tilson Thomas.

In September 2008, Bousfield gave several performances of Nino Rota's Trombone Concerto with the Vienna Philharmonic, conducted by Riccardo Muti, in Vienna, Tokyo, and Lucerne.

== Discography ==
=== Solo recordings ===
- Beethoven & Brahms: Trios & Sonatas (for Trombone) (Camerata CMCD-28209)
- Memories and Dreams (Camerata CMCD-28336)
- Pryor Engagement – with the Black Dyke Band; Nicholas J. Childs, conductor (Doyen DOY CD212) – solos composed by, or famously performed by, the legendary American trombonist Arthur Pryor.
- Solo Trombone: French Collection (Camerata CMCD-28117) – works for trombone and piano by Eugène Bozza, Claude Debussy, Jean-Michel Defaye, Henri Dutilleux, Philippe Gaubert, Charles Gounod, J. Guy Ropartz, Camille Saint-Saëns, and Carlos Salzedo.
- The Versatile Virtuoso – with IMI Yorkshire Imperial Band; Eric Crees, conductor (Doyen DOY CD014, 1992) – popular trombone solos with brass band and synthesizer.
- Virtuosi (EMI 72435 662892 2) – standard trombone and piano repertoire by Leonard Bernstein, Eugène Bozza, Herbert L. Clarke, Jean-Michel Defaye, Henri Dutilleux, Alexandre Guilmant, Gustav Holst, Arthur Pryor, Folke Rabe, Camille Saint-Saëns, Stjepan Sulek, and Carl Maria von Weber.

=== Recordings as featured soloist ===
- American Classics: Leonard Bernstein (EMI Classics 5099964112152) – contains Leonard Bernstein's Elegy for Mippy II for solo trombone.
- Autumn Leaves: 1993 Festival of Gospel Song – with The Canadian Staff Band; Brian Burditt, bandmaster (The Salvation Army Festival FGSCD2093) – contains Erik Leidzen's Concertino and Don Morrison's Consecration for trombone and brass band.
- Bourgeois – with the Sun Life Band; Roy Newsome, conductor (Stanshawe STA005CD) – contains Derek Bourgeois' Trombone Concerto, Op. 114a for trombone and brass band.
- Bourgeois in Brass – with the Yorkshire Building Society Band; David King, conductor (Egon SFZ 113) – contains Derek Bourgeois' Sonata for Trombone and Brass Band, Op. 156B.
- Buxton Orr – With The Royal Scottish Academy of Music & Drama Wind Orchestra; Bryan Allen or Nigel Boddice, conductor (Doyen 118) – contains Buxton Orr's Trombone Concerto.
- Frank Martin: Ballades – with The London Philharmonic; Matthias Bamert, conductor (Chandos CHAN 9380) – contains Frank Martin's Ballade for trombone and orchestra.
- Masters of Space and Time – with The National Youth Brass Band of Great Britain; Bramwell Tovey, conductor (Polyphonic QPRL225D) – contains W.A. Mozart's Concerto No. 2 in E Flat Major for trombone and brass band, arr. Mark Freeh.
- Music of Elgar Howarth – with Eikanger-Bjørsvik Musikklag; Elgar Howarth, conductor (Doyen 066) – contains Elgar Howarth's Trombone Concerto for trombone and brass band.
- Takashi Yoshimatsu: Symphony No. 4, etc. – with the BBC Philharmonic; Sachio Fujioka, conductor (Chandos CHAN 9960) – contains Takashi Yoshimatsu's Trombone Concerto "Orion Machine", Op. 55 for trombone and orchestra.

=== Orchestral recordings ===
Bousfield's orchestral recordings are numerous, but the highlights include the "Star Wars Episode I: Phantom Menace" recording with the LSO (BMG, 1997), the tenor horn solo in Mahler's 7th Symphony with Michael Tilson Thomas and the LSO (Sony, 1999), the large trombone solo in Mahler's 3rd Symphony with Pierre Boulez and the VPO (DG, 2003), and with the same forces, the live Mahler 2nd symphony, particularly the final movement.

Also notable are his recordings with the LSO Brass, particularly "American Brass".
