= Wild man (disambiguation) =

The wild man is a figure of medieval European art, literature and folklore.

Wild man may also refer to:

== People ==
- Wild Man, a name for bigfoot, sasquatch, or similar creatures
- Pavlo Ishchenko (born 1992), Ukrainian-Israeli boxer nicknamed Wild Man
- Ishi (c. 1860–1916), "Wild Man of Oroville", the last member of the Yahi tribe of California
- Wild Man Fischer (1944–2011), American songwriter

== Arts, entertainment, and media ==
- Wild Man (film), 1977 New Zealand comedy
- "Wild Man" (Kate Bush song), 2011
- "Wild Man" (Ricky Van Shelton song)
- "Wild-Man", song by The Tamrons
- Wild Man, a 2005 sculpture by hyperrealistic artist Ron Mueck

== See also ==
- Wild Man of Borneo (disambiguation)
- Wildman (disambiguation)
