= Dudley Bright =

- Born: Harrow London
- Occupations: Royal Professor Royal Academy of Music Principal Trombone, London Symphony Orchestra
- Instrument: Trombone
- Years active: 2001–present

Dudley Bright was appointed Principal Trombone of the London Symphony Orchestra in 2001 and retired from that position in June 2018. Prior to that, he held the same position with the Philharmonia Orchestra and Halle Orchestra and before that briefly as an associate with the LSO. He is also Professor of Trombone at the Royal Academy of Music.

== Education ==
He studied at the Guildhall School of Music and Drama with Denis Wick, graduating in 1974. During that year he was an associate member of the LSO before joining the Hallé Orchestra, aged 22. It was while he was in that orchestra that he taught Ian Bousfield who was only 14 at the time.

== Solo career ==
In 1988, while Principal Trombonist of the Philharmonia Orchestra, Dudley Bright was co-soloist with Philip Smith (then Principal Trumpet of the New York Philharmonic Orchestra) on an album called Principals on which they were accompanied by the New York Staff Band of The Salvation Army.

In 2004 Dudley Bright was the featured soloist on Grimethorpe Colliery Band's recording "The History of Brass Band Music - The Salvation Army Connection" in Erik Leidzen's Concertino for Band and Trombone.

In 2007, he recorded his own solo Life's Command with the International Staff Band of The Salvation Army which was released on a CD called Supremacy.

In 2008, he recorded Erik Leidzen's Concertino for Band and Trombone again, this time with the South London Fellowship Band.

In April 2014, Mr Bright was the guest soloist with The National Youth Brass Band of Great Britain when he performed Arthur Pryor's Thoughts of Love and his own composition Life's Command.

In May 2023 Bright was awarded the Neill Humfeld Award from the International Trombone Association.

== Compositions ==
Bright has composed a number of works for brass, much of it for Salvation Army brass bands. A major composition, The Cost of Freedom, was commissioned by The International Staff Band of The Salvation Army which gave the first performance at the Epic Brass II concert at The Sage, Gateshead in May 2008.

He has written four large-scale works for the students of the London Symphony Orchestra’s Brass Academy, which rotates each year between the four orchestral sections (strings, wind, brass and percussion); Pursuing the Horizon 2004, Bunhill Variations 2008, Jubilee Music 2012 and Reach for the Sky 2016. Pursuing the Horizon was written for three large brass choirs and features the hymn tune St. Luke (the LSO being based in St. Luke's, London). At the request of the International Staff Band of The Salvation Army the work was revised (renamed Pursuing Horizons) and performed by eight Salvation Army staff bands during ISB120 at the Royal Albert Hall in June 2011. A single band version also exists and was the test piece for the First Section of the Dutch National Brass Band Championships 2014.

Other works include the following;

Marches; Rise Up, O Youth (1972), Brooklands (1979), Spirit of the West (1983), Assignment (1986).

Abundant Joy (1980), Confrontations (1981), The Greatest of These (1988), Are You Joyful? (1992), Excelsior (1991), Fanfare, Hymn and Thanksgiving (1996), Strike for Victory (1998), In Good Company (2007), Paean (2009), Fantasia on 'Glory to His Name' (2015).
