= Stanshawe Band (Bristol) =

English brass band

The Stanshawe Band was a brass band in the English City of Bristol.

== History ==
The Stanshawe Band was formed in Eastville, Bristol in 1968. Under the tutorship of conductor Walter B. Hargreaves, the band progressed rapidly, finishing first place in the Wills Championships Grand Finals in 1973 and winning Granada Band of the Year in 1974. In 1978 the band was renamed to the Sun Life Stanshawe Band after being sponsored by Sun Life Assurance. The band's string of successes culminated in the band winning the BBC Best of Brass Final in 1979.

The band had many different conductors throughout its lifespan, the most prominent of which were the aforementioned Walter B. Hargreaves as well as Brian Howard, Derek Bourgeois, Barry Pope and Roy Newsome.

From the 1980s the Sun Life Stanshawe Band toured European Countries; and won the open brass section at Kerkrade in 1993. The band also featured in the 1982 BBC period drama "The Barchester Chronicles", and provided the opening theme to the BBC radio series "Down Your Way" .

In 1997, the Sun Life Stanshawe Band was disbanded, this was due to a loss of sponsorship, lack of new members and a loss of founding members. In 2001, the CD collection "Legacy" was produced as a memory of some of the band's most well-known songs. Veterans of the band still meet at reunions to this day.

== Discography ==
- Spectrum (1975)
- The Sound of Brass Series (1976)
- Oliver Cromwell (1977)
- Langford in Concert (1978)
- Carnival (1980)
- Conductors Showcase (1981)
- Highlights from the BBC Television Brass Band Contest (1983)
- Bourgeois (1994)
- Enchanted Carols (1998)
- Legacy (2001)
- Recorded Delivery
- The Music of Roy Newsome
- Heritage of the March

== See also ==
- Brass band (British style)
