= Fibonacci Sequence (ensemble) =

British chamber ensemble

The Fibonacci Sequence is a British chamber ensemble cofounded by horn player Stephen Stirling in 1984. Purposefully flexible, the ensemble is capable of concert programmes ranging from solo up to a dectet featuring strings, winds, brass, piano, and percussion. According to Gramophone in 2003, "no praise can be too high for the Fibonacci Sequence's polished and dashingly committed performances."

Pianist Kathron Sturrock is the artistic director. Other musicians include double bassist Duncan McTier and violist Yuko Inoue.

Graham Fitkin composed a sextet, Sinew (first performed 2009), for the ensemble. The ensemble has released fourteen albums and appeared on at least six non-ensemble albums. Their 2012 album featured clarinetist Julian Farrell as soloist.
