= Kathron Sturrock =

British pianist

Kathron Sturrock is a British pianist who studied with Cyril Smith (pianist), Joan Trimble, Alfred Brendel and Rostropovich, and worked with Elisabeth Schwarzkopf.

She is a professor at the Royal College of Music and has recorded for Hyperion, Chandos, Pickwick, Sain, Gamut, ASV, Naxos and Black Box Records. Sturrock is the artistic director of the Fibonacci Sequence. She is also the only pianist to have twice won the prize for the best accompanist at the Sofia International Opera Competition.

She recorded a series of albums with the double bassist Duncan McTier.

She has performed in most countries in Europe, North America, India and Australia, performs regularly in the London concert halls, and records frequently for BBC Radio 3.
