= Christopher Brown (British composer) =

British composer

Christopher Roland Brown (born 17 June 1943) is a British composer.

== Career ==
He was born in Tunbridge Wells. and from the age of 9 he was a chorister at Westminster Abbey. He studied under director of music David Lepine at Dean Close School, Cheltenham, and then at the Royal Academy of Music with Lennox Berkeley, and with Boris Blacher at the Hochschule für Musik in Berlin. He was also a choral scholar at King's College, Cambridge between 1962 and 1965. In 1969 Brown went on to teach composition at the Royal Academy, where he stayed for nearly 40 years. His pupils there and at Cambridge included Kit Armstrong, Charlotte Baskerville, Dominy Clements, Jonathan Pitkin and John Webb.

He is a composition supervisor at the University of Cambridge and has been active as conductor (of the Huntingdonshire Philharmonic, Cambridge Players, New Cambridge Singers and Dorset Bach Cantata Club), choral trainer and examiner.

== Music ==
Much of his work has been choral or vocal, including Three Shakespeare Songs (1965), Elegy (1967, for speaker, soloists, chorus and brass quintet), the Herrick Songs (1971), Hodie Salvator Apparuit (1971, described by Rob Barnett as "one of the finest extended choral items in the British repertoire" and performed by Stephen Wilkinson with the BBC Northern Singers), and Mass for 4 Voices (1992).

A Hymn to the Holy Innocents (1965) was his first large scale choral work, scored for chorus and orchestra. It was followed by David (1970), Chauntecleer (1980), Magnificat (1980), The Vision of Saul (1983), Landscapes (1986) and The Circling Year (1989). There are several song cycles (Wordsworth Songs 1969, The Snows of Winter 1971, Seascape 1981), and four operas for children: The Split Goose Feather (1979), The Ram King (1981), The Two Lockets (1988) and Die Schwindlerin (1990).

His orchestral works include a five movement Sinfonia (1970), The Sun: Rising (1977), Triptych: Three Symphonic Pieces after Dürer (1978), an Organ Concerto (1979) and Ruscelli d’Oro (1990). There is also much chamber music. Brown's String Quartet No 1 was the winner of the first Guinness Prize for Composition in 1970, and his String Quartet No 2 (1975) won first prize in the Washington International Competition Prize. He also won the Prince Pierre of Monaco Prize in 1976.

More recent compositions include A Five-Gated Well (2009), written for the choirs of Clare College and Trinity College, Cambridge, setting poems by Rowan Williams, and the 24 Preludes and Fugues, composed between 2011 and 2019 and published in 2020. A recording of the set, performed by Nathan Williamson, was issued by Lyrita in 2024.

== Recordings ==
- Invocation, op.90 for double choir and organ, New Cambridge Singers, Riverrun Records RVRCD68 (2004)
- Laudate Dominum, on Choral Music from Canterbury Cathedral, Priory Records PRAB111 (1980)
- Seascape, Elegy, Lauds, British Chamber Choir, cond. David Lawrence, Images for brass quintet, Brass Unlimited. CMS (1991)
- There is No Rose of Such Virtue, on Hodie (Carols From Cambridge), Clare College Chapel Choir, Grasmere – GRCD 113 (2016)
- 'Tis Christmas Time, carols and Christmas music, Huntingdon Philharmonic and Canticum
- 24 Preludes & Fugues, Nathan Williamson, piano, Lyrita SRCD2431 (2024)
