= Wild Man of Borneo =

Wild Man of Borneo or Wild Man from Borneo may refer to:

People

- Dayak people, indigenous people of Borneo
- Oofty Goofty or Wild Man of Borneo, real name Leon Borchardt (1862–1923 or later), German-born sideshow performer in the United States
- Wild Men of Borneo, Waino and Plutanor, real names Hiram W. Davis (1825–1905) and Barney Davis (1827–1912), American dwarf brothers and freak show performers
- Nickname for Jimi Hendrix (1942–70), American rock musician

Animals

- Wild Man From Borneo, racehorse that won the 1895 Grand National
- Bornean orangutan, primate species

Fiction

- The Wild Man of Borneo (film), 1941 American comedy film
- "Wild Man from Borneo", fictional freakshow in The Kid from Borneo, a 1933 short comedy film
- “Wild Man from Borneo”, a song by country singer Kinky Friedman

== See also ==
- Wild man (disambiguation)
- Wild Women of Borneo, 1932 goona-goona epic film
