= New London Chamber Ensemble =

Wind Quintet

The New London Chamber Ensemble is a wind quintet formed in 2001. The ensemble performs works such as Berio's Opus Number Zoo, Saint-Saëns' Carnival of the Animals and new commissions by Edward Longstaff and John Woolrich. The group often introduces theatrical elements into its performances and has trained with the actor and writer Danny Scheinmann and the theatre directors Phillip Parr and Peta Lily.

Since 2001, the New London Chamber Ensemble has been Quintet in Residence to the National Youth Chamber Orchestra of Great Britain, a youth chamber orchestra for highly talented young musicians which performs without conductor. The Ensemble’s work involves coaching orchestral and chamber music repertoire in preparation for bi-annual concerts. In 2003 it also worked with Nuphonics Young Composers in an education project with the East Sussex Wind Orchestra.

The current members of the quintet are Robert Manasse (flute), Melanie Ragge (oboe), Neyire Ashworth (clarinet), Stephen Stirling (horn) and Adam Mackenzie (bassoon). Members have performed with groups such as the City of Birmingham Symphony Orchestra, the Scottish Chamber Orchestra, the Rotterdam Philharmonic Orchestra, the Academy of St Martin in the Fields and the Chamber Orchestra of Europe.

In March 2007 the ensemble released a recording of music by the composer John Woolrich entitled Cabinet of Curiosities with the pianist Julian Jacobson (for piano and wind), A Book of Studies Nos 1-3 (for wind quintet), Darker Still (for flute and piano) and Favola in Musica I (for clarinet, oboe and piano).
