= John Webb (composer) =

English composer

John Webb (born 1969) is an English composer.

== Biography ==
He was educated in Essex where he started playing the piano and viola. He began to compose at 14, and two years later attended Colchester Institute. Here he studied piano with Frank Wibaut and composition with John Joubert at the Birmingham Conservatoire.

As a founding member of the Thallein Ensemble, he performed works by Berio, Messiaen, Finnissy, Ives and Schnittke. In his final year he completed a dissertation on Schnittke's polystylism and was the soloist in his piano concerto.

After graduating from Birmingham Conservatoire with a first class degree, he studied for three years at the Royal Academy of Music with Christopher Brown. In his last year he was Leverhulme Composition Fellow and won the major composition prizes; he graduated with MMus and DipRAM.

He went on to develop contacts with period instrument performers and has written works for 'old' instruments which have recently been revived, including viols, harpsichord (commissions by Gary Cooper and Trevor Pinnock), and baroque orchestra.

He lectures at Birmingham Conservatoire and runs education projects for English National Opera, The Stables, Milton Keynes and the Wigmore Hall. He taught composition and general studies at the Junior Department of the Royal Academy of Music until leaving at the end of the 2005-2006 academic year. He has since returned to cover David Knotts' timetable whilst his colleague was in America.

My main goals are:

- To write music which is satisfying and demanding for performers and listeners. If the music is a struggle in places, it should be a struggle which is worth the effort.
- To build a language which can encompass a huge variety of elements: the extremely simple and the extremely complex, tonality and atonality, etc. As a composer I want to have a full spectrum of musical colours at my disposal.
- In tackling the above, not to compromise stylistic unity, or my own stylistic voice.

Now, please go and listen

— John Webb

== Selected works ==
=== Orchestral works ===
- Concerto for classical accordion, strings and clarinet (1997) 20 mins
- White Stones (1995-6) 8 mins; orchestra
- Barcarolle (1993-4) 9 mins; orchestra
- A Caribbean Dawn and Celebration (1993) 12 mins; orchestra and steel band
- The Tin-Pot Foreign General and the Old Iron Woman (1990) 13 mins; orchestra and narrator. From the book by Raymond Briggs

=== Choral works ===
- Into His Marvellous Light (1997) 5 mins; choir, solo viola and organ

=== Chamber works ===
- Cries of London (1994) 25 mins; string quartet
- Prelude, Waltz and Tambourin (1994-5) 7 mins; 4 violins
- Four Bagatelles (1994) 14 mins; free bass accordion, two violins, cello
- On Christmas Night... (1994) 9 mins; 3 baroque oboes, 3 oboes da caccia, 2 baroque bassoons, 1 baroque contra-bassoon, harpsichord, percussion
- Masque (1995) 5 mins; treble viol, two tenor viols, bass viol
- Calm (1992) 9 mins; flute, oboe, clarinet (or viola), violin, cello
- PUMP (1992) 7 mins; 4 bassoons
- Sextet for Piano and Wind
- Prelude and Chaconne; baroque orchestra

=== Instrumental works ===
- Sans Noir (1995) 9 mins; piano; also versions for harpsichord and wind quintet
- Here's Fine Rosemary, Sage and Thyme... (1994) 3 mins; viola
- Pastorale (1993) 5 mins; organ
- Five Atmospheres (1998) 9 mins; piano
- Chromatic Rhapsody (1987) 5 mins; two pianos
- Hop-bodee-boody's Last Will and Testament for soprano, 4 violas and harpsichord (1998)

=== Vocal works ===
- Love Songs (1992) 15 mins; tenor and guitar. Texts by Roger McGough and Tony Harrison
