= Walter B. Hargreaves =

Walter B. Hargreaves (1907–1998), also known by the affectionate nickname of 'The Wee Professor', was a conductor for brass bands.

During his career, Hargreaves conducted the Grassmarket Silver Band, Crook Hall Band, and the Stanshawe Band as well as many others across England.
