= Stephen Stirling (musician) =

Stephen Stirling is a soloist, chamber musician, and a Professor of Horn at the Trinity Laban Conservatoire of Music and Dance in London.

== Early career ==
As a student he was a member of the National Youth Orchestra of Great Britain and the Jeunesses Musicales World Orchestra; he studied at the Royal Northern College of Music and went straight into the Hallé Orchestra for three years when he left college in 1979. From there he went to the Chamber Orchestra of Europe (COE) for the following ten years.

== Notoriety ==
Gary Carpenter's Concerto (nominated for a British Composer Award) was written for Stephen Stirling and the BBC Philharmonic Orchestra, conducted by Baldur Brönnimann, and given its world and broadcast premiere in April 2005. Other world premieres have included solo works by Stephen Dodgson and Martin Butler – Hunding (2004); the latter was again performed by Stephen Stirling in the very first moments of the grand opening of Kings Place in London in 2008.

Stephen Stirling has performed in Europe, Africa, Australia, Asia and the Americas. He is a founder member of Endymion, the Fibonacci Sequence, and the New London Chamber Ensemble. He is co-principal horn of the Academy of St Martin in the Fields and principal of the City of London Sinfonia.
