= William Ifor Jones =

William Ifor Jones FRAM
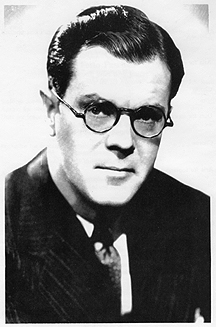
- Carnegie Hall program photograph.

Background information
- Born: 23 January 1900; Merthyr Tydfil, Wales
- Died: 11 November 1988 (aged 88); Philadelphia, Pennsylvania, U.S.
- Genres: Sacred music; Johann Sebastian Bach
- Occupations: Conductor; composer; arranger
- Instruments: Organ; piano
- Years active: 1920 – mid-1980s

William Ifor Jones (January 23, 1900 – November 11, 1988) was a Welsh conductor and organist. Born into a large coal-mining family and raised in Merthyr Tydfil, Jones studied at the Royal Academy of Music as a scholarship student in London from 1920 to 1925. He studied the organ with Sir Stanley Marchant at St. Paul's Cathedral, London; orchestral conducting with Ernest Read and with Sir Henry Wood, (he became Wood's assistant at the Queen's Hall Orchestra); and harmony with Benjamin Dale. He was for a time organist at the Welsh Baptist Church in Castle Street, London, worked at the Royal Opera House, as a vocal coach at Covent Garden, assisted with the British National Opera Company in the role of prompter, and was the Assistant Choir Master at St. Paul's Cathedral, London.

== Biography ==
Jones emigrated to the United States in early 1930. He conducted the New Chamber Orchestra in Philadelphia, and The Tudor Singers in Bethlehem, Pennsylvania. He taught at the Peabody Conservatory of Music in Baltimore, Maryland, and at Rutgers University - Douglas College in New Brunswick, New Jersey. While at Rutgers, he formed a glee club and also performed the complete organ works of Johann Sebastian Bach.

At the Union Theological Seminary School of Sacred Music, New York City, he led conducting courses for choirmasters. He was involved with the Berkshire Music Festival at Tanglewood, and taught many summer school workshops, clinics and seminars.

He was at various times organist at the Presbyterian Church in Bound Brook, New Jersey, at the Broadway Tabernacle in New York City, and at the Central Moravian Church in Bethlehem, Pennsylvania. He also worked with the Handel Choir in Westfield, New Jersey, at the Bach Youth Chorale in Bethlehem, Pennsylvania, and led the Cantata Singers in Quakertown, Pennsylvania.

=== The Bach Choir of Bethlehem ===
In 1939, he made his debut as the third conductor of The Bach Choir of Bethlehem. On February 18, 1946, at Carnegie Hall, the choir performed Bach's Mass in B minor with Ifor Jones, conductor; Ruth Diehl, soprano; Lilian Knowles, contralto; Lucius Metz, tenor; Calvin Marsh, baritone; Edwin Steffe, bass; E. Power Biggs, organ; The Philadelphia Orchestra. On April 13, 1947, an estimated 9,200 people attended a performance of The Mass in B Minor at the Cathedral of St. John the Divine in New York. Ifor Jones conducted The Choir and members of The Philadelphia Orchestra.

- 1948 – The Bach Choir records Cantata #78 for Victor Records.
- 1956 – Mass in b minor - March 27, Carnegie Hall: The Bach Choir of Bethlehem with Ifor Jones, conductor; Phyllis Curtin, soprano; Eunice Alberts, contralto; John McCollum, tenor; Mack Harrell, bass; Vernon de Tar, organ; The Philadelphia Orchestra.
- 1957 – The 50th Bach Festival celebrated. Ifor Jones opens the Thursday evening rehearsal to the community.
- 1959 – The Bach Festival Orchestra makes its first appearance, at the May Festival, replacing the Philadelphia Orchestra.
- 1962 – The 55th Bach Festival is dedicated to Albert Schweitzer, with a letter from Schweitzer printed in the program.

In October 1965, the choir sings at the International Choral Festival, commemorating the 150th anniversary of the Handel and Haydn Society in Symphony Hall, Boston.

- 1969 – Ifor Jones retires as conductor of the choir.

His only known television appearance with the choir was on The Bell Telephone Hour, conducting "Going to Bethlehem".

Ifor Jones retired in 1969, and died at Philadelphia, Pennsylvania.

== Publications ==
- Bach Cantatas (G. Schirmer, NY)
- Bach 'Missa Brevis' in G (H.W. Gray, NY)
- Brahms Part Songs, (C. Fischer, NY)
- Original Pieces for Female and Men's Voices (Kalmus)

== Honors ==
- Associate of the Royal Academy of Music, London
- Fellow of the Royal Academy of Music, London First foreigner to be so honored by the RAM - 1948.

== Honorary Doctorates ==
- The American Conservatory of Music, Chicago, IL
- Moravian College, Bethlehem, PA
