= Rachel Helleur =

British cellist

Rachel Helleur-Simcock (born 1980) is a British cellist and member of The Hallé

== Biography ==
Born in Ipswich, Rachel Helleur-Simcock studied cello at the Royal Academy of Music in London, the Eastman School of Music in Rochester, NY, and later in Berlin at the Hochschule für Musik "Hanns Eisler" and at the Karajan Academy, the music academy associated with the Berliner Philharmoniker. Helleur-Simcock then went on to play as a guest musician with the Philharmonia Orchestra, the London Philharmonic Orchestra, the London Symphony Orchestra, Bavarian Radio Symphony Orchestra, and the NDR Elbphilharmonie Orchestra. She was Principal Cellist at the Deutsche Oper for two years before joining the Berliner Philharmoniker in 2009. Helleur-Simcock was a permanent member of the Berliner Philharmoniker 2009-2025 also of the 12 Cellists of the Berlin Philharmonic. A portrait from the series "The Berliner Philharmoniker and their instruments" shows the musician in symphony concerts and at work with her string quartet. Helleur-Simcock also describes her 18th-century Italian instrument whose sound she associates with wood and honey.

From the 2025/2026 season, Rachel Helleur-Simcock is the Section Leader, Cello, of The Hallé. Her first concert, on the opening night of the season on 25 September 2025, became her solo debut as she stepped in at short notice to replace the indisposed Truls Mørk to perform Elgar's Cello Concerto.
