= Denis Wick =

British orchestral trombonist (1931–2025)

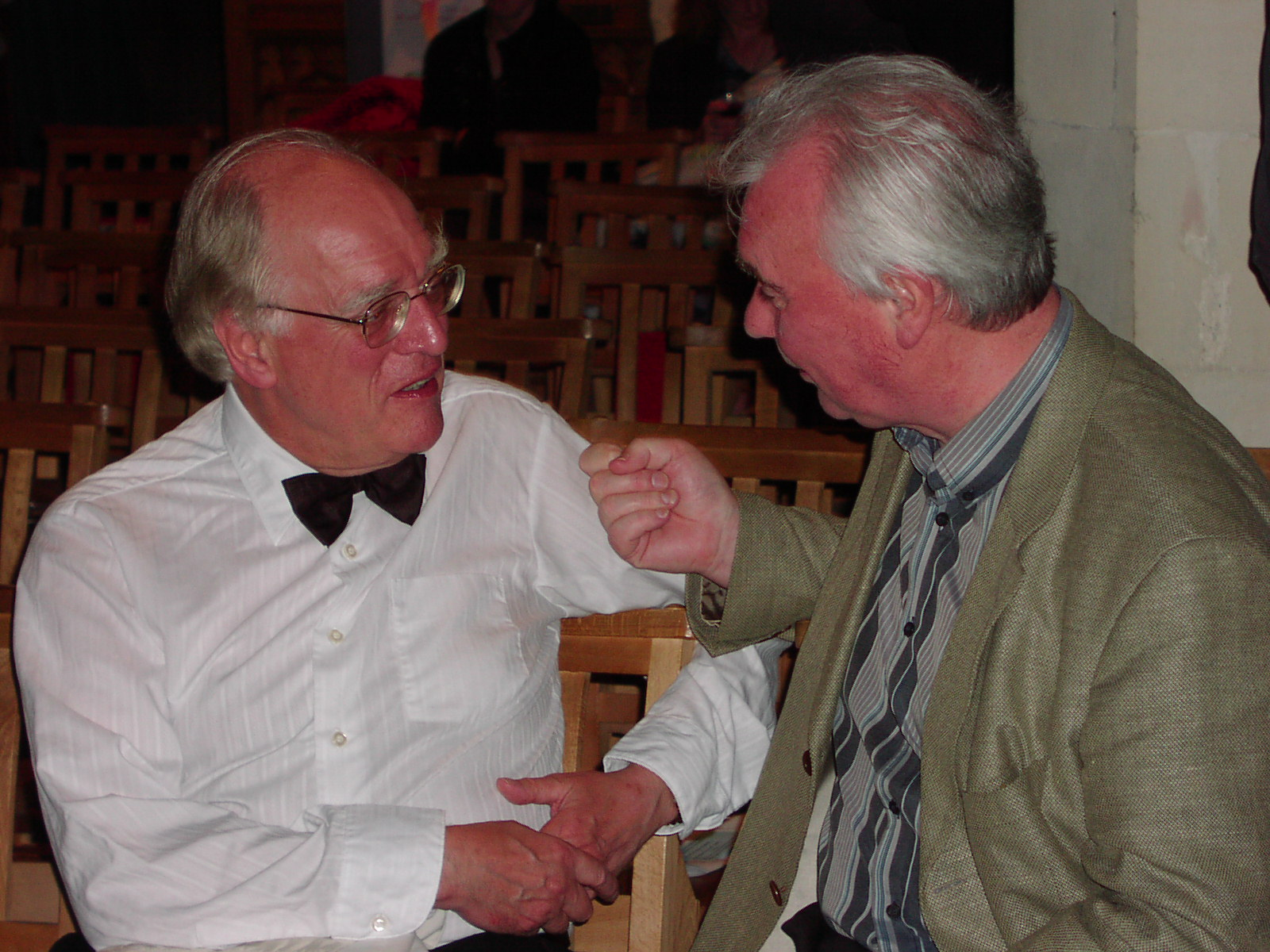
Wick (left) in conversation with fellow LSO member George Reynolds, 2001

Denis Wick (1 June 1931 – 12 February 2025) was a British orchestral trombonist. He was also an internationally respected brass teacher and designer of brass mutes and mouthpieces. On retirement in 1989 he was awarded the International Trombone Association's annual award; he served as their president 2004–2006.

== Life and career ==
Wick was born in Braintree, Essex on 1 June 1931. He attended King Edward VI Grammar School, Chelmsford, and Luton Grammar School. He taught himself the trombone from the age of 10 when he received an instrument from the Chelmsford Salvation Army band. He played with the band until the age of 15 and soon joined Luton Brass Band which was enjoying considerable national success at the time. At the age of 16 he heard his first orchestral concert, and Malcolm Arnold's trumpet playing so inspired him that he decided to pursue a career in playing.

Because his family was not well off, his mother worked to fund his studies. He spent a year at the Royal Academy of Music from 1950, but claimed he was frustrated with not learning anything there. Sid Langston was the professor, but he all but refused to pass on any of his experience in case his students 'stole' his work.

Wick did an amateur date in Salisbury and by chance the other trombonists were from the Bournemouth Symphony Orchestra, so when the 2nd trombone job came up in July 1950, they called to invite him to audition, having already heard many of the final year students at the London music colleges. Wick won this audition and entered this large full-time professional orchestra at the age of 19. He went on to win an audition with the City of Birmingham Symphony Orchestra in 1952, a year after conductor Rudolf Schwarz had moved there. The audition had to be rigorous to persuade the administrators that Schwarz was not practising favouritism towards an ex-colleague from the BSO.

In Birmingham in 1955 Wick worked with Gordon Jacob in premiering his trombone concerto. This piece shows off the advances in technique that he was making: the cadenza in the last movement makes great use of warm-up and flexibility studies that Wick had developed and would prove hugely influential in the teaching of brass players in Britain to this day.

He held the position of principal trombone at the London Symphony Orchestra from 1957–1988, including when it recorded John Williams' arrangement of the opening title for Star Wars. The brass playing in the Star Wars films has encouraged a whole generation of brass players, Wick making a blistering sound in partnership with Maurice Murphy, on 1st trumpet. Another recording where Wick made his mark is in the large solo in the 1970 LSO/Horenstein (Unicorn) recording of Mahler's Third Symphony.

Soon after moving to the LSO, Wick moved the LSO section from .485" bore Boosey Imperial tenor trombones and a .523" G bass trombone to the American "large bore" instruments (.547" tenor and slightly larger bass, now in B♭). Experimentation possibly started in Birmingham, and the Jacob Concerto suits the larger sound, but post-war import restrictions made these instruments impossible to obtain legally before 1958. Certainly he was a pioneer in Britain, and soon all the other orchestral players followed suit.

Wick taught initially at the Guildhall School of Music and Drama (1967–1989) and from 2000 had served on the faculty at the Royal Academy of Music, London. He was conductor of the Second Essex Youth Orchestra from 1977-1990s. He had also worked with the Gustav Mahler Youth Orchestra since 1993. He created his own line of mouthpieces and mutes for brass instruments, made by Denis Wick Products Ltd, and owned by Denis Wick Publishing.

He was honoured by the International Trombone Association several times. In 1989 he was awarded the ITA Award, presented each year to an individual who has greatly influenced the field of trombone. In 2006 he was presented with the Neill Humfeld Award, which recognises outstanding trombone teaching. During his presidency of the ITA 2004–2006 he brought the International Trombone Festival to Birmingham, and made great strides to internationalise the ITA magazine.

Wick died on 12 February 2025, at the age of 93.

== Discography ==
- 1968 Mahler – Symphony No. 3 (LSO/Solti, Decca)
- 1969 Berlioz – Grande symphonie funèbre et triomphale (LSO/Davis, Philips)
- 1970 Mahler – Symphony No. 3 (LSO/Horenstein, Unicorn)
- 1973 Walker – Trombone Concerto (LSO/Freeman, CBS)
- 1978 Stravinsky – Pulcinella (LSO/Abbado, Deutsche Grammophon)
