= Derek Bourgeois =

English composer (1941–2017)

- Born: Derek David Bourgeois; 16 October 1941; Kingston upon Thames, England
- Died: 6 September 2017 (aged 75); Poole, Dorset, England
- Education: Cambridge University, Royal College of Music
- Occupation: Music composer
- Spouses: Jean Bourgeois (m. 1965; died 2006) Norma Bourgeois (m. 2008)
- Website: www.derekbourgeois.com

Derek David Bourgeois (16 October 1941 – 6 September 2017) was an English composer.

== Career ==
Derek Bourgeois was born in Kingston upon Thames in 1941. After receiving his university education at Magdalene College, Cambridge (honours degree and doctorate), Bourgeois spent two years at the Royal College of Music, studying composition with Herbert Howells and conducting with Sir Adrian Boult.

From 1971 to 1984, Bourgeois was a lecturer in music at Bristol University, and director of the National Youth Orchestra from 1984 to 1993. In 1980 he began conducting the Sun Life Band (now the Stanshawe Band of Bristol), which was his introduction to brass bands. In 1994 Bourgeois was appointed director of music at St Paul's Girls School, London, a position previously held by a number of noted composers, including Gustav Holst and Herbert Howells.

After retiring from this post in 2002 he and his wife settled in Mallorca. Following her death in 2006, he remarried in 2008 and moved to New York City, but returned to the United Kingdom in 2009. He also conducted for various orchestras. His symphonies included Jabberwocky-Extravaganza (1963) and the symphonic fantasy The Astronauts (1969). For his Symphony of Winds, the First International Conference for Conductors, Publishers and Composers awarded him with their main commission in 1981. He also chaired Composer's Guild of Great Britain and served as the artistic director of Bristol Philharmonic Orchestra. He founded the National Youth Chamber Orchestra of Great Britain in 1988. He was also a member of the Music Advisory Panel of the Arts Council.

Bourgeois was a prolific composer for brass and wind bands. His works in that area included two concerti for brass band, the concerto grosso, Blitz, Diversions, Serenade, The Devil and the Deep Blue Sea, and Apocalypse. Reviewing Bourgeois's Sonata for Trombone, David Vinning of trombone.org wrote: "Bourgeois is a skilled composer who knows how to write for the trombone and this piece is a major new work sure to become popular." Bourgeois's first band work was a concerto, adapted from a flute concerto. He has also played the tuba.

Bourgeois's first symphony, which he composed at the age of 18, was positively reviewed in the Guardian by Stanley Sadie, the future editor of Grove's Dictionary. By 2009, Bourgeois had written 44 symphonies, well beyond the number composed by Havergal Brian, and a larger number than were produced by most 19th and 20th century composers. In an interview with Alan Rusbridger of the Guardian, he said that the symphonies came "tumbling out." By the time of his death in 2017, he had 116 symphonies to his name.

Bourgeois also composed music for the television movie The Crucible (1981), the short documentaries Thirty Million Letters (1963) and The Driving Force (1966), the TV series The Barchester Chronicles (1982), Mansfield Park (1983), and the "Buddyboy" episode of the TV series Beasts (1976).

== Personal life ==
Bourgeois' first wife, the violinist Jean Bourgeois, died of motor neurone disease on 27 November 2006. She had played in the BBC National Orchestra of Wales and was also a piano teacher. After returning to the UK from the USA in 2009, Bourgeois lived in Wool, Dorset, with his second wife, Norma Bourgeois. He died on 6 September 2017 in Poole, Dorset, and was survived by Norma.

== Works ==
Orchestral and Choral Music

- Symphony for Chamber Orchestra, Op. 8: 15 minutes (1960)
- Symphony No. 1, Op. 10: 19 minutes (1961)
- Overture "Mail Train", Op. 16: 9 minutes (1963)
- "Jabberwocky" – Extravaganza for baritone, chorus and orchestra, Op. 18: 55 minutes (1963)
- Symphonic Variations, Op. 19: 24 minutes (1964)
- Promenade for large or small orchestra, Op. 20: 4 minutes (1964)
- Serenade for Small Orchestra, Op. 22a: 3 minutes (1965)
- Variations on a Theme of Mozart for Two Double Basses and Orchestra, Op. 24: 12 minutes (1966)
- Concertino for Clarinet and Strings, Op. 25: 13 minutes (1967)
- Symphony No. 2, Op. 27: 36 minutes (1968)
- Orchestral Fantasy "The Globe", Op. 29: 16 minutes (1969)
- Variations and Commentaries for Strings, Op. 31: 15 minutes (1969)
- Overture "Green Dragon", Op. 32: 8 minutes (1969)
- Concerto for Amateur Orchestra, Op. 36: 25 minutes (1971)
- Bass Tuba Concerto, Op. 38: 43 minutes (1972)
- Symphonic Pageant, Op. 41:13 minutes (1973)
- Fanfare for Shakespeare for orchestra, Op. 45: 2 minutes (1975)
- Dance Variations for Small Orchestra, Op. 50: 18 minutes (1976)
- Clarinet Concerto, Op. 51: 19 minutes (1976)
- "Conflicts" for orchestra, Op. 52: 10 minutes (1976)
- Concerto for Three Trombones, Strings and Percussion, Op. 56: 22 minutes (1977)
- Symphony No. 3, Op. 57: 50 minutes (1977)
- Symphony No. 4 "A Wine Symphony", Op. 58: 55 minutes (1978)
- "Triumphal March" for tenor, chorus and orchestra, Op. 59: 18 minutes (1978)
- Double Bass Concerto, Op. 62: 26 minutes (1979)
- Cantata Gastronomica for mezzo-soprano, chorus and orchestra, Op. 63: 35 minutes (1979)
- Romance for Double Bass and Orchestra, Op. 64: 11 minutes (1979)
- "Chamber of Horrors" Four Demonic Dances for orchestra, Op. 66: 14 minutes (1980)
- Symphony No. 5, Op. 68: 25 minutes (1980)
- Euphoria – Euphonium solo with Brass band, Op. 75 : 8 minutes (1981)
- Overture "Red Dragon", Op. 83: 8 minutes (1982)
- A Gloucester Fanfare for chorus, organ, brass band and orchestra, Op. 89: 4 minutes (1983)
- Fantasy for Orchestra, Op. 92: 10 minutes (1984)
- Sinfonietta for Chamber Orchestra, Op. 93: 20 minutes (1984)
- Flourish for DCPS for orchestra, Op. 94: 2 minutes (1984)
- "Kubla Khan" for soprano, tenor, chorus, brass band and orchestra, Op. 95:22 minutes (1985)
- Organ Concerto, Op. 101: 16 minutes (1986)
- "Armada" for mezzo-soprano, chorus and orchestra, Op. 104: 58 minutes (1987)
- Symphony No. 6 "A Cotswold Symphony", Op. 109: 35 minutes (1988)
- Trombone Concerto, Op. 114: 20 minutes + (BIS cd) (1988)
- Variations "Bass is Beautiful" for orchestra, Op. 118: 8 minutes (1989)
- Euphonium Concerto, Op. 120: 20 minutes (1990)
- Horn Concerto, Op. 121: 20 minutes (1990)
- Concert March "Happy and Glorious" for orchestra(with optional chorus), Op. 128: 7 minutes (1992)
- Welsh Fanfare No. 1 for orchestra, Op. 132: 1 minute (1992)
- Concerto for String Quartet and Orchestra, Op. 138: 29 minutes (1994)
- Welsh Fanfare No. 2 for orchestra, Op. 140: 1 minute (1994)
- Concerto for Percussion and Orchestra, Op. 143: 20 minutes (1995)
- "Song of Farewell" for orchestra, Op. 153: 10 minutes (1997)
- "MM" for chorus and orchestra, Op. 157: 32 minutes (1998)
- "A Dorset Celebration" for orchestra, Op. 159: 9 minutes (1998)
- Symphony No. 7 "The First Two Thousand Years" for tenor, chorus and orchestra, Op. 158: 55 minutes (1999)
- Romance for Violin, Cello and Orchestra, Op. 165: 10 minutes (1999)
- "The Fruit of That Forbidden Tree" for soprano, baritone, chorus and orchestra, Op. 166: 30 minutes (2000)
- "Holy Ground" for choirs, four saxophones and strings, Op. 172: 10 minutes (2001)
- West of England Fanfare for orchestra, Op. 177: 3 minutes (2001)
- Prelude "What Ho!" for orchestra, Op. 178: 6 minutes (2002)
- "Seascapes" for soprano, baritone, chorus and orchestra, Op. 180: 15 minutes (2002)
- Violin Concerto, Op. 181: 35 minutes (2002)
- Symphony No. 8 "The Mountains of Mallorca", Op. 184: 73 minutes (2002)
- Symphony No. 9, Op. 185: 111 minutes (2003)
- Symphony No. 10, Op. 190: 40 minutes (2003)
- Symphony No. 11, Op. 195: 45 minutes (2003)
- Symphony No. 12, Op. 197: 34 minutes (2003)
- Fox-Trot for orchestra, Op. 198: 10 minutes (2003)
- Symphony No. 13 "The Unlucky", Op. 199: 65 minutes (2003)
- Symphony No. 14 in one movement, Op. 200: 20 minutes (2003)
- Wedding Song for soprano, chorus and orchestra, Op. 272a: 3 minutes (2003)
- Symphony No. 15, Op. 201: 50 minutes (2003)
- Symphony No. 16 "Songs of Mallorca" for soprano and orchestra, Op. 207: 40 minutes (2004)
- Symphony No. 17, Op. 208: 65 minutes (2004)
- Symphony No. 18, Op. 214: 43 minutes (2004)
- Symphony No. 19, Op. 216: 34 minutes (2004)
- Symphony No. 20, Op. 218: 42 minutes (2005)
- Symphony No. 21, Op. 219: 21 minutes (2005)
- Symphony No. 22, Op. 221: 50 minutes (2005)
- Symphony No. 23, Op. 226: 35 minutes (2005)
- Symphony No. 24, Op. 230: 42 minutes (2005)
- Symphony No. 25 in one movement, Op. 232: 28 minutes (2005)
- Symphony No. 26, Op. 233: 30 minutes (2005)
- Symphony No. 27, Op. 235: 52 minutes (2005)
- Symphony No. 28, Op. 237: 34 minutes (2006)
- Symphony No. 29, Op. 238: 45 minutes (2006)
- Concerto for Bass Trombone and Band, Op. 239: 16 minutes (2006)
- Symphony No. 30, Op. 241: 65 minutes (2006)
- Symphony No. 31, Op. 244: 21 minutes (2006)
- Symphony No. 32, Op. 245: 65 minutes (2006)
- Symphony No. 33, Op. 247: 62 minutes (2006)
- Symphony No. 34, Op. 249: 44 minutes (2006)
- Symphony No. 35, Op. 250: 50 minutes (2006)
- Symphony No. 36, Op. 252: 43 minutes (2007)
- Symphony No. 37, Op. 254: 31 minutes (2007)
- Symphony No. 38, Op. 256: 48 minutes (2007)
- Symphony No. 39, Op. 258: 42 minutes (2007)
- Symphony No. 40, Op. 269: 38 minutes (2007)
- Symphony No. 41 "Sinfonia Andalucia", Op. 261: 70 minutes (2007)
- Symphony No. 42 "Life, the Universe and Everything" for SATB soloists, chorus and orchestra, Op. 262: 155 minutes (2008)
- Symphony No. 43, Op. 270: 31 minutes (2008)
- Symphony No. 44, Op. 273: 30 minutes (2009)
- Symphony No. 45 "What Ho! Symphony", Op. 275: 25 minutes (2009)
- Symphony No. 46 "A Dorset Symphony", Op. 276: 43 minutes (2009)
- Symphony No. 47 in one movement, Op. 278: 18 minutes (2009)
- Symphony No. 48, Op. 280: 43 minutes (2009)
- Symphony No. 49, Op. 281: 45 minutes (2009)
- Symphony No. 50, Op. 284: 37 minutes (2009)
- Symphony No. 51, Op. 286: 28 minutes (2009)
- Symphony No. 52 "The Halfway", Op. 287: 38 minutes (2009)
- Symphony No. 53 "Sinfonia Semplice", Op. 288: 39 minutes (2010)
- Symphony No. 54, Op. 289: 32 minutes (2010)
- Symphony No. 55, Op. 290: 28 minutes (2010)
- Symphony No. 56, Op. 292: 28 minutes (2010)
- Symphony No. 57, Op. 294: 35 minutes (2010)
- Symphony No. 58 in one movement, Op. 296: 22 minutes (2010)
- Symphony No. 59 "Percussion Symphony", Op. 298: 29 minutes (2010)
- Symphony No. 60, Op. 299: 41 minutes (2010)
- Symphony No. 61, Op. 300: 38 minutes (2010)
- Symphony No. 62, Op. 302: 42 minutes (2010)
- Symphony No. 63, Op. 303: 38 minutes (2011)
- Sonata for Tenor Horn and Piano, Op. 304: (2011)
- Symphony No. 64, Op. 305: 38 minutes (2011)
- Symphony No. 65 "Overture, Concerto and Symphony", Op. 306: 85 minutes (2011)
- Symphony No. 66, Op. 311: 29 minutes (2011)
- Symphony No. 67 "The Tuneful", Op. 315: 36 minutes (2011)
- Symphony No. 68, Op. 316: 34 minutes (2011)
- Symphony No. 69, Op. 317: 40 minutes (2012)
- Symphony No. 70, Op. 319: 41 minutes (2012)
- Symphony No. 71, Op. 320: 31 minutes (2012)
- Symphony No. 72 "The Ghost", Op. 322: 26 minutes (2012)
- Symphony No. 73, Op. 323: 37 minutes (2012)
- Symphony No. 74, Op. 325: 41 minutes (2012)
- Symphony No. 75, Op. 326: 40 minutes (2012)
- Symphony No. 76, Op. 334: 37 minutes (2012)
- Symphony No. 77, Op. 335: 32 minutes (2012)
- Symphony No. 78, Op. 336: 45 minutes (2012)
- Symphony No. 79, Op. 337: 36 minutes (2012)
- Symphony No. 80, Op. 338: 35 minutes (2012)
- Symphony No. 81, Op. 339: 36 minutes (2013)
- Symphony No. 82, Op. 341: 39 minutes (2013)
- Symphony No. 83, Op. 343: 38 minutes (2013)
- Symphony No. 84, Op. 344: 36 minutes (2013)
- Symphony No. 85, Op. 348: 36 minutes (2013)
- Symphony No. 86, Op. 350: 43 minutes (2013)
- Symphony No. 87 "Four British Seasons" for soprano and orchestra, Op. 351: 40 minutes (2013)
- Symphony No. 88, Op. 353: 35 minutes (2013)
- Symphony No. 89, Op. 354: 30 minutes (2013)
- Symphony No. 90, Op. 355: 45 minutes (2014)
- Symphony No. 91, Op. 356: 39 minutes (2014)
- Symphony No. 92, Op. 357: 40 minutes (2014)
- Symphony No. 93, Op. 359: 30 minutes (2014)
- Symphony No. 94 "The Predictable", Op. 360: 33 minutes (2014)
- Symphony No. 95, Op. 361: 33 minutes (2014)
- Symphony No. 96, Op. 363: 31 minutes (2014)
- Symphony No. 97, Op. 364: 36 minutes (2014)
- Symphony No. 98 "Organ Symphony", Op. 365: 37 minutes (2014)
- Symphony No. 99, Op. 366: 35 minutes (2014)
- Symphony No. 100, Op. 368: 36 minutes (2014)
- Symphony No. 101 "The Sundial", Op. 369: 37 minutes (2015)
- Symphony No. 102, Op. 370: 41 minutes (2015)
- Symphony No. 103 "The Swiss Roll", Op. 372: 33 minutes (2015)
- Symphony No. 104 "The Esterhazy", Op. 373: 33 minutes (2015)
- Symphony No. 105 "Symphony of Classical Forms", Op. 374: 33 minutes (2015)
- Symphony No. 106, Op. 375: 35 minutes (2015)
- Symphony No. 107, Op. 376: 37 minutes (2015)
- Symphony No. 108, Op. 377: 33 minutes (2015)
- Symphony No. 109, Op. 378: 34 minutes (2015)
- Symphony No. 110, Op. 380: 23 minutes (2016)
- Symphony No. 111 "The Nelson", Op. 382: 31 minutes (2016)
- Symphony No. 112, Op. 383: 37 minutes (2016)
- Symphony No. 113, Op. 385: 23 minutes (2016)
- Symphony No. 114, Op. 386: 33 minutes (2017)
- Symphony No. 115, Op. 389: 36 minutes (2017)
- Symphony No. 116, Op. 391: 30 minutes (2017)
