= Eric A. Wildman =

English corporal punishment advocate

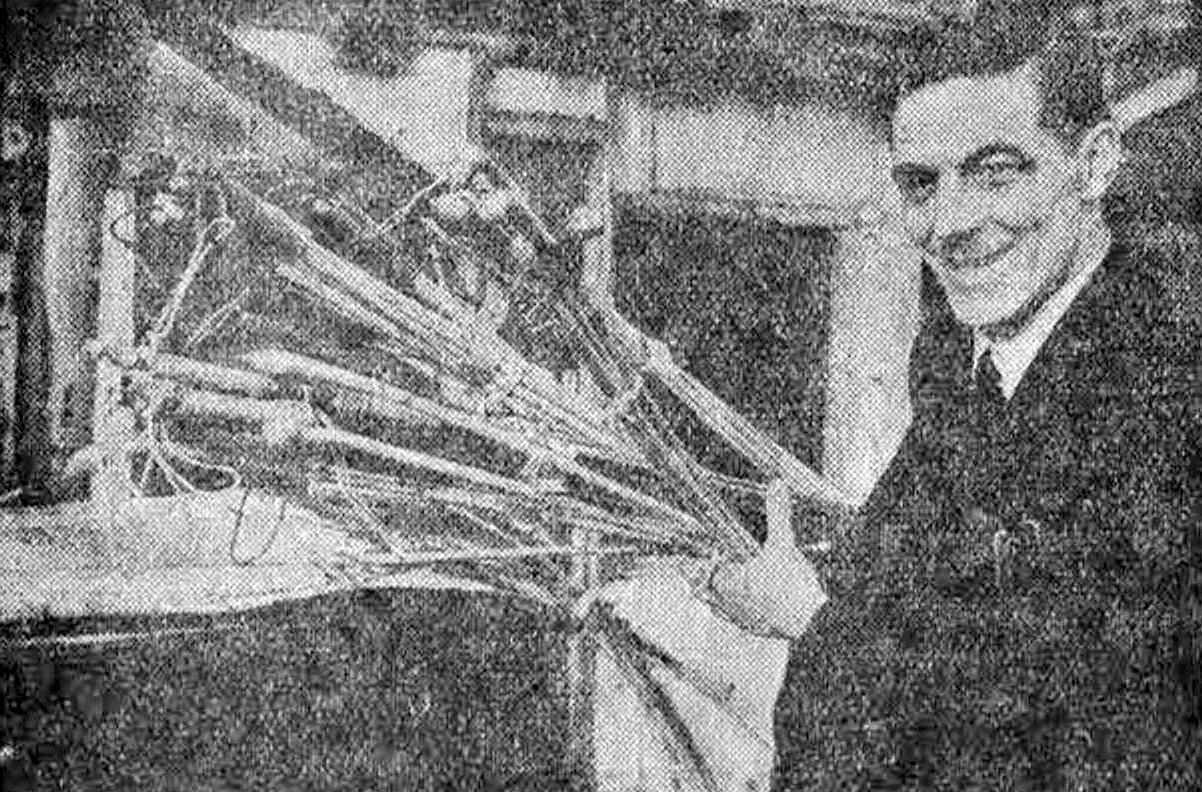
- Wildman showing off his canes, 1948
- Born: 20 May 1921; Walthamstow, England
- Died: May 1990 (aged 68–69)

Eric Arthur Wildman (20 May 1921 – May 1990) was an English advocate for corporal punishment in schools. He was the founder of the National Society for the Retention of Corporal Punishment. His business, Corpun Educational Organisation, produced birches and canes and distributed pro-corporal punishment literature.

== Biography ==
Eric Arthur Wildman was born in Walthamstow, where his father was an oil-shop manager at a local firm.

== Military service ==
During World War II Wildman served in the Merchant Navy.

== Career ==
The founder of the National Society for the Retention of Corporal Punishment, Wildman edited its Bulletin, as well as a publication called The Retentionist. He also published many pamphlets on corporal punishment. His main business was the production of "instruments of correction" such as birches, canes, and straps. In the pamphlet Juvenile Justice, he claimed that Corpun Educational Organisation had 10,000 "satisfied customers" including teachers, educational authorities, and parents.

Wildman initially operated out of Oxford Circus in London, but was forced to move to Kensington following objections by his landlord and neighbours. He hired men to wear sandwich boards in Kensington advertising his business. In addition, he gave public lectures at Caxton Hall.

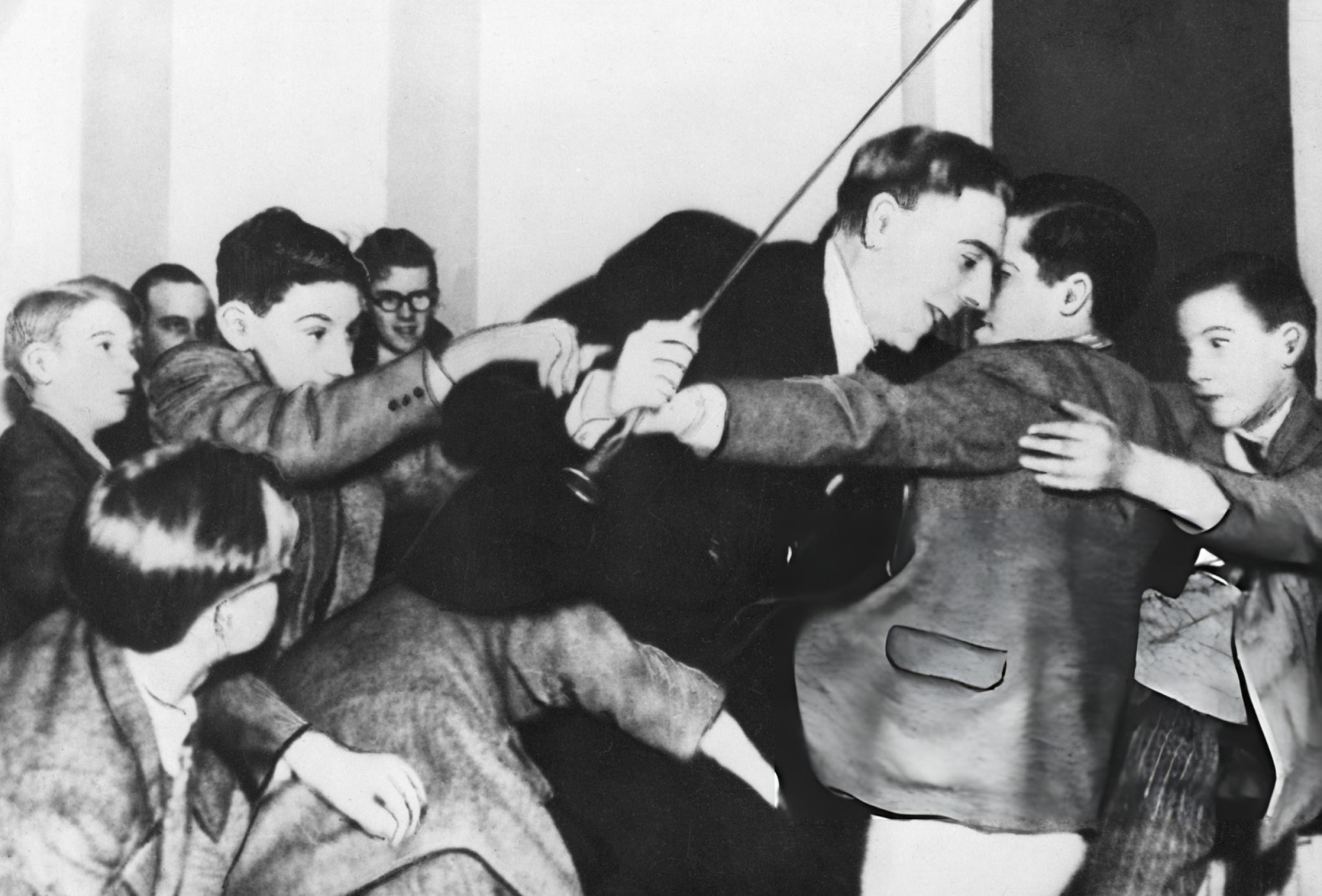
Wildman tackled by students of Horsely Hall, 1948

On November 24, 1948, Wildman was invited to lecture at a progressive private school, Horsley Hall, near Eccleshall, Staffordshire. The school advocated for "self expression" and its headmaster, Robert Copping, was anti-corporal punishment. Following his speech, Wildman was caned by the students, an event captured by photographers and covered in newspapers nationally and internationally. Wildman reported the incident to police and threatened legal action. He also presented to a local hospital, complaining that he had nine visible weals from the incident.

In January 1953, his City Road office was raided by police, who seized weapons and printed material which filled four large vans. One of the pamphlets seized was called A Girl's Beating: Punishment Postures. Wildman was charged with publishing obscene libel. In his defence, his lawyers argued that he had suffered physical and psychological trauma that led him to fanaticism about corporal punishment, and that he was a religious man who taught Sunday school and genuinely believed he was pursuing God's work. He was found guilty and ordered to pay £500 within six months or go to jail. His young adopted daughter was removed from his care and his application to adopt another child was canceled.

He ceased operations in the 1960s and became a private tutor. The Private Case of the British Library kept five parcels of pamphlets issued by Wildman and Corpun, as well as two booklets on flagellation which were withdrawn "on legal advice" prior to publication.
