= David Strange =

British cellist

David Tinsley Strange MBE is a British cellist formerly head of strings at the Royal Academy of Music and a University of London Professor.

He studied cello at the Royal Academy of Music. In 1973 he was appointed Principal Cellist of the Royal Philharmonic Orchestra. In 1985 he was invited to become the Principal Cellist of the Royal Opera House Orchestra.

Strange was Head of Strings of the Royal Academy of Music until 2011, is cello tutor of the European Union Youth Orchestra and since 2002 a professor of the University of London.

Strange was appointed Member of the Order of the British Empire (MBE) in the 2020 New Year Honours for services to music.
