= Simon Shaw-Miller =

English art historian (born 1960)

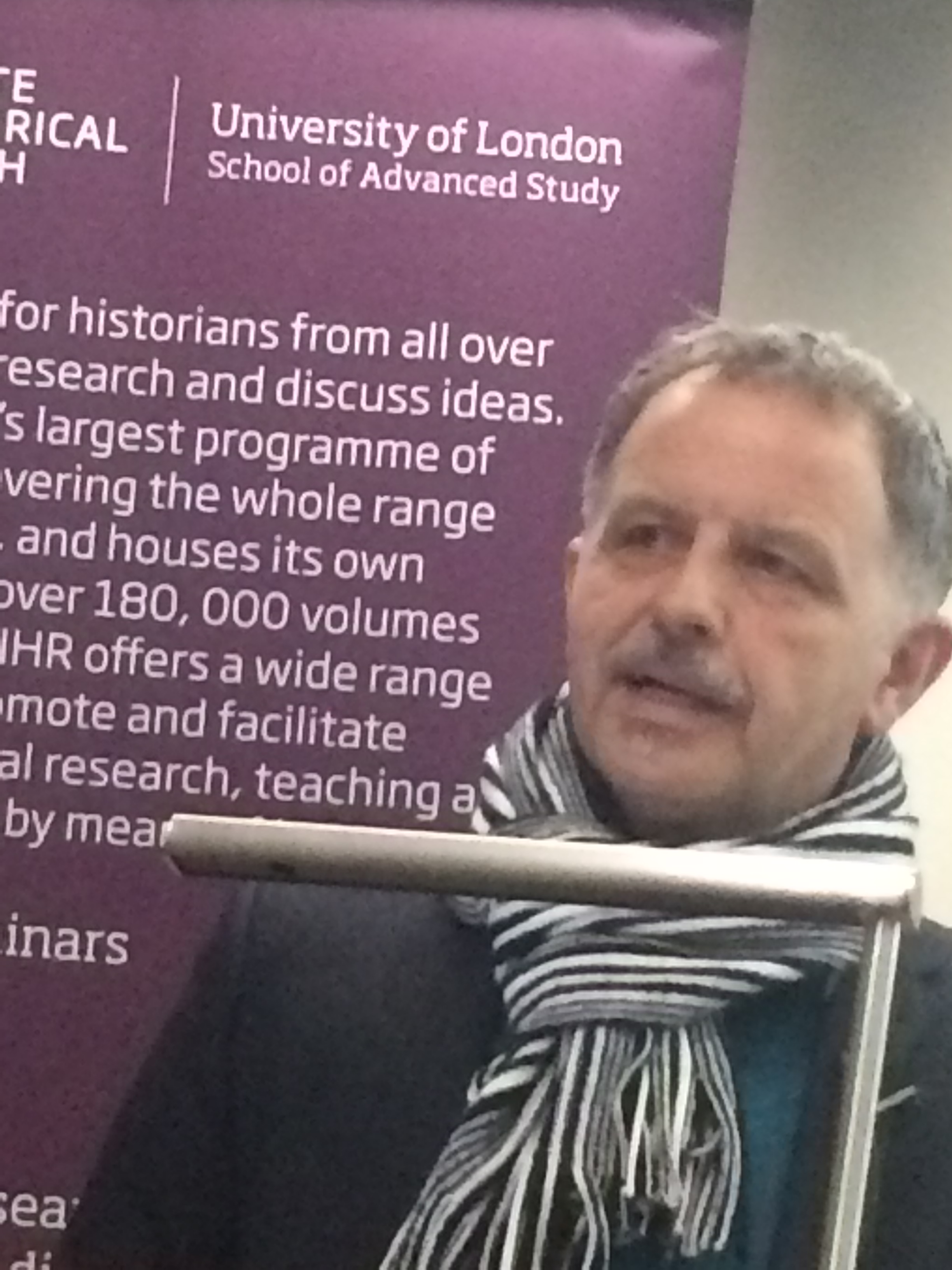
Simon Shaw-Miller

Simon Shaw-Miller (born 1960) is emeritus professor of history of art at the University of Bristol. He is a specialist in the relationships between art and music in the modern period.

== Early life and education ==
Simon Shaw-Miller was born Simon Miller in 1960 in Pembury, on the outskirts of Royal Tunbridge Wells. He was brought up in the village of Hollingbourne and the council estates of Park Wood and Senacre on the outskirts of Maidstone, in Kent. He attended Oldborough Manor High School, and then went to Brighton Polytechnic (later the University of Brighton) to study for a joint degree in art with music, graduating in 1982. He did post graduate research in the Department of Art History and Theory at the University of Essex, studying with Michael Podro, Peter Vergo, John Nash, Dawn Ades and Thomas Puttfarken, and was awarded his doctorate in 1988 for "Music and Art and the Crisis in Early Modernism: An introduction to some non-serial dodecaphonic techniques". The examiners of his doctorate were the composer Gordon Crosse and the musicologist Donald Mitchell.

== Academic career ==
Simon Shaw-Miller is emeritus chair of history of art at the University of Bristol having been appointed in 2013 and made professor emeritus in 2022. He was previously the professor of history of art and music in the School of Arts, Birkbeck College, University of London, where he was first appointed in 1995. He is an honorary associate and research fellow of the Royal Academy of Music, a fellow of the Royal Society of Arts and a fellow of the Higher Education Academy. He was in post at Birkbeck for over 17 years having previously held a senior teaching and research fellowship jointly in the Department of History of Art and the Department of Music at the University of Manchester. Prior to this he was a junior teaching and research fellow in the Department of History of Art at the University of St. Andrews, Scotland.

He is a specialist in the relationships between music and the visual, his research interests are the history of art and music in the modern period (1800-1960s). His research is concerned with questions of interdisciplinary methodology, modernism, the concepts of visual music, musical iconography, synaesthesia, musical ekphrasis, sound art and the aesthetics of the Gesamtkunstwerk.

== Curating ==
Shaw-Miller has been active as a curator and was involved in the programming of music in the gallery at Tate, St Ives, between 2004 and 2007. He has curated exhibitions at the Crawford Arts Centre, St Andrews; Pallant House Gallery, Chichester and the Royal College of Art, London. He was also an advisor to the major exhibition The Art of Music at the San Diego Museum of Art, which ran from 26 September 2015 through to 8 February 2016, before moving to the Museo del Palacio de Bellas Artes in Mexico City, from 10 March – 5 June 2016. From January to May 2018 he curated, with Charlotte de Mille, the exhibition 'Out of Time' at King's Place in London, relating self-portraiture according to four themes emanating from the Spring music programme of 'Time Unwrapped': memory, suspension and reflection, alternative time, and movement. The exhibited works came from Piano Nobile's Ruth Borchard Collection of British self-portraiture in the 20th and 21st centuries. He has laterly been involved in the major exhibition, 'Fabienne Verdier: Vortex', at Waddington Custot Gallery in London, writing on music and art interactions in Verdier's recent paintings. More recently he has written on the fugal paintings of Kandinsky for the Musée de la Musique, Philharmonie de Paris and the Centre Pompidou’s exhibition ‘Kandinsky: La musique des couleurs’ which ran from October 15, 2025 to February 1, 2026.

== Awards ==
In 2007 he was made an Honorary Associate of the Royal Academy of Music, (Hon) ARAM. In 2009 he was awarded the Prix Ars Electronica Media.Art.Research Award for his interdisciplinary research on art and music and for the manuscript of his book Eye hEar. He was visiting research fellow at Merton College, University of Oxford, Michaelmas 2019/20.

== Family ==
Shaw-Miller is married to Lindsey Shaw-Miller, an art historian who has held among other posts the Edward Speelman Fellowship in Dutch and Flemish Art at Wolfson College, Cambridge (1996–2000). They have one daughter, Aniella. On marriage they changed their surname from Simon Miller and Lindsey Shaw to Shaw-Miller.

== Selected publications ==
- Improvision: Orphic Art in the Age of Jazz. Bloomsbury Academic, 2022. ISBN 978-1-35-0203426 (pbk. published 2023)
- Eye hEar The Visual in Music. Ashgate, 2013. ISBN 978-1-4094-2644-8 (2nd ed. published by Routledge, 2016 pbk), ISBN 978-1-13-824569-3
- Samual Palmer Revisited ed. with Sam Smiles, Ashgate, 2010. ISBN 978-0-7546-6747-6
- Eye-Music: Kandinsky, Klee and All that Jazz with F. Guy and M. Tucker, Pallant House Press, Chichester, 2007. ISBN 978-1-869827-03-8
- Visible Deeds of Music: Art and Music from Wagner to Cage. Yale University Press, 2002 (reprint pbk. 2004)
- Image:Music:Text eds. with M. Pointon, P. Binski. Oxford, UK and Cambridge, USA: Blackwell, 1996. ISBN 0 631 20074 6
- The Last Post: Music after Modernism ed. Manchester University Press and St.Martin's Press, 1993. ISBN 0 7190 3609 7
