= Jonathan Pitkin =

Irish-Scottish composer (born 1978)

Jonathan Pitkin (born 1978) is a contemporary classical composer and lecturer.

Pitkin was born in Dublin but grew up in Edinburgh. He studied at Christ Church, Oxford and at the Royal Academy of Music under Christopher Brown, where he was the recipient of several prizes and awards. His music has been commissioned and performed internationally.

In 1998 he attended Karlheinz Stockhausen's inaugural composition course in Kürten, Germany, and in 2000 spent three months at the Paris Conservatoire, where he studied with Guy Reibel as well as following courses in orchestration and electro-acoustic composition. He has also participated in classes and seminars with composers including Sir Harrison Birtwistle, Poul Ruders and Michael Finnissy.

In 2002 Pitkin worked as an assistant composer on the RPS Award-winning Sound Inventors initiative, and in 2003 he wrote for St Albans High School as part of the spnm/Making Music scheme Adopt a Composer, in connection with which he appeared on BBC Radio 3’s Music Matters. He now teaches composition and academic courses at the Royal College of Music. He has created a "misbehaving piano", an art installation.

In 2001 he was awarded the Temple Church Composition Prize for his anthem Hark! a herald voice is calling and was shortlisted by the Society for the Promotion of New Music. Three of his works were broadcast on BBC Radio 3 in 2004, including the orchestral piece Borrowed Time. Two of his choral pieces were published by Oxford University Press in the New Horizons series.

Pitkin was awarded a DMus in composition by the Royal College of Music in 2009, having received support from the Arts and Humanities Research Council.

He has written for the proceedings of NIME and the ICICI Bank, and contributed to The Encyclopedia of Music in the Social and Behavioral Sciences (2014) and The Routledge Companion to Aural Skills Pedagogy (2021).
