= Martin Jones (pianist) =

English pianist (born 1940)

Martin Jones (born 4 February 1940 in Witney, England) is an English concert pianist. He studied at the Royal Academy of Music in London under Guido Agosti, Guy Jonson, and Gordon Green. He has been highly regarded since debuting in the international arena when he won the Dame Myra Hess Award in 1968.

== Career ==
His London debut was at the Queen Elizabeth Hall in 1968. His New York debut was at Carnegie Hall, also in 1968. Jones has performed with various orchestras throughout the world, including the London Festival Orchestra, the Halle Orchestra, the Adelaide Symphony Orchestra, and the BBC Welsh Orchestra. Besides many standard concertos, he has played the Ferruccio Busoni concerto and the Samuel Barber concerto, as well as concertos by William Mathias, John McCabe, Constant Lambert, and Xaver Scharwenka. He toured Canada with the BBC Welsh Orchestra and has given recitals in Florida, Tennessee, and California, a Brahms recital at Wigmore Hall in 1993, and radio broadcasts in Britain, Ireland, and the United States. He was pianist-in-residence at University College, Cardiff, from 1971 to 1983.

Jones performed the piano part in the Oscar-nominated soundtrack to Howards End, performing Percy Grainger's Bridal Lullaby and Mock Morris.

== Recordings ==
Jones is a recording artist on the Nimbus Records label. Recordings include:

Extended content
- Enrique Granados: The Complete Published Works for Solo Piano (Nimbus 1734)
- Meditations for All Seasons (Nimbus 1737)
- Karol Szymanowski: Complete Piano Music (Nimbus 1750)
- Percy Grainger "Dished up for piano": Complete Piano Music (Nimbus 1767)
- Felix Mendelssohn: Complete Piano Music (Nimbus 1772)
- Claude Debussy: Complete Piano Music (Nimbus 1773)
- Johannes Brahms: Complete Piano Music (Nimbus 1788)
- Sergei Rachmaninoff: Corelli Variations & Moments Musicaux (Nimbus 5292)
- Dmitri Shostakovich: Piano Concertos & Chamber Symphony (Nimbus 5308)
- Virtuoso Piano Showpieces (Nimbus 5326)
- Finzi, Parry, Bridge: An English Suite (Nimbus 5366)
- Spirit of England II (Nimbus 5450)
- Igor Stravinsky: Piano Music (Nimbus 5519/20)
- Spanish Piano Music Volume 1: Granados, Albéniz (Nimbus 5595/8)
- Spanish Piano Music Volume 2: Turina, Falla, Mompou (Nimbus 5619/23)
- Erich Wolfgang Korngold: The Piano Music (Nimbus 5705/08)
- Darius Milhaud: Selected Piano Music
- Federico Mompou: The Piano Music Volume 1 (Nimbus 5724/7)
- Earl Wild: Virtuoso Arrangements on Melodies of Gershwin (Nimbus 5743)
- Alun Hoddinott: Piano Sonatas 1-10 (Nimbus 5747/8)
- Hans Gál: The Piano Music (Nimbus 5751/2)
- Carlos Guastavino: Complete Piano Music (Nimbus 5818/20)
- Carl Czerny: The Sonatas for Solo Piano Volume 1 (Nimbus 5832/3)
- Ernesto Halffter: The Piano Music (Nimbus 5849)
- Joaquín Nin: The Piano Music (Nimbus 5851)
- Carl Czerny: The Sonatas for Solo Piano Volume 2 (Nimbus 5863/4)
- Carl Czerny: The Sonatas for Solo Piano Volume 3 (Nimbus 5872/3)
- Federico Mompou: The Piano Music Volume 2 (Nimbus 5877/9)
- Jean Françaix: The Music for Solo Piano, Duo & Duet (Nimbus 5880/2)
- Meditations at Sunset: Finzi, Haydn, Elgar, J. C. Bach, Respighi, Bartok (Nimbus 7010)
- Meditations for Autumn (Nimbus 7069)
- Claude Debussy: Clair de Lune and other Piano Favourites (Nimbus 7702)
- Percy Grainger: "Dished up for Piano" Volume 1 (Nimbus 5220)
- Percy Grainger: "Dished up for Piano" Volume 2 (Nimbus 5232)
- Percy Grainger: "Dished up for Piano" Volume 3 (Nimbus 5244)
- Percy Grainger: "Dished up for Piano" Volume 4 (Nimbus 5255)
- Percy Grainger: "Dished up for Piano" Volume 5 (Nimbus 5286)
- Percy Grainger: Piano Favourites (Nimbus 7703)
- Felix Mendelssohn: Songs without Words (Nimbus 7704)
- Enrique Granados: Goyescas - Isaac Albéniz: Iberia (Nimbus 7719/20)
- Joaquín Turina: Piano Works (Nimbus 1710; released 2020)
- Isaac Albeniz: Piano Works (Nimbus 1711; released 2020)
- William Grosvenor Neil: Illuminations (Piano Music of William Grosvenor Neil) (PnOVA 21007; released 2024)

Jones also made recordings that were issued on LP:

- Ferruccio Busoni: Elegies (Argo LP ZRG 741; released 1973)
  - Note: Adrian Corleonis of Fanfare ranked this recording as one of the very finest of the Elegies, saying that it strikes "the ideal balance between atmosphere and crackle...."
