= Philip Smith (musician) =

American classical trumpeter (born 1952)

Philip Smith (born 1952) is an American classical trumpet player. He is former principal trumpet with the New York Philharmonic and played with the orchestra from 1978 to 2014. Smith, born in the United Kingdom, is from a Salvation Army background. He assumed the co-principal position in the New York Philharmonic in June 1978 and the principal position in 1988. He also is a supporter of brass bands, performing with various groups of distinction.

In 2013, Smith was announced as the William F. and Pamela P. Prokasy Professor of trumpet at the University of Georgia, where he teaches alongside Brandon Craswell. Before Smith, this position had been occupied by Fred Mills, former trumpeter with the Canadian Brass, and David Bilger, principal trumpet of the Philadelphia Orchestra.

== Education ==
Smith began cornet lessons at the age of 8 under his father, cornet virtuoso Derek Smith, who was a renowned cornet player in his own right. Smith entered the Juilliard School in 1970, where he was introduced to orchestral playing and studied under teachers Edward Treutel and William Vacchiano. While in his final year at Juilliard, Smith was accepted as Fourth Trumpet of the Chicago Symphony Orchestra under Sir Georg Solti. For three years, Smith performed alongside principal trumpet Adolph Herseth.

== Premieres ==
Smith has performed four premieres with the New York Philharmonic:

- World premiere of Joseph Turrin's Trumpet Concerto (Philharmonic commission)
- US premiere of Jacques Hétu's Trumpet Concerto
- World premiere (2000) of Lowell Liebermann's Concerto (Philharmonic commission)
- World premiere (2003) of Siegfried Matthus's Double Concerto for Trumpet, Trombone, and Orchestra (Philharmonic commission, performed with Joseph Alessi, principal trombone).

== Other performances and recordings ==
- Canadian Brass
- Empire Brass
- The Chamber Music Society of Lincoln Center
- Mostly Mozart Orchestra
- Bargemusic
- New York Virtuosi Chamber Symphony
- Philharmonie des Vents du Québec
- Göteborg Brass
- Rigid Containers Group Band
- Black Dyke Band
- New York Philharmonic Principal Brass Quintet
- Salvation Army New York Staff Band
- U.S. Army Brass Band
- The National Youth Brass Band Of Great Britain
- In 1980 he performed with the Naumburg Orchestral Concerts, in the Naumburg Bandshell, Central Park, in the summer series.

== Album releases ==
He has worked at the Juilliard School of Music in New York City, and has many albums attributed to him, such as:

- Fandango (a contest solo produced by the International Trumpet Guild), featuring New York Philharmonic principal trombonist Joseph Alessi and the University of New Mexico Wind Symphony (Summit Records)
- My Song of Songs with the New York Staff Band of The Salvation Army (Triumphonic)
- Principals with Dudley Bright and the New York Staff Band of The Salvation Army (Triumphonic)
- Copland's Quiet City (Deutsche Grammophone)
- New York Legends (CALA): part of a series involving New York Philharmonic musicians
- Orchestral Excerpts for Trumpet (Summit Records): notable for being composed only of popular trumpet excerpts, especially those often called for in orchestral auditions
- Ellen Taaffe Zwilich's Concerto for Trumpet and Five Instruments (New World)
- Bach's Brandenburg Concerto No. 2 (Koch)
- Walton's Façade (Arabesque)
- The Trump Shall Resound and Repeat the Sounding Joy (Heritage)
