= Yuko Inoue =

Japanese violist

- Born: Japan Shizuoka, Hamamatsu
- Other name: 井上 祐子
- Occupation: violist

Yuko Inoue (井上 祐子, Inoue Yūko; born Hamamatsu, Shizuoka, Japan), is a Japanese classical violist.

== Biography ==
She studied violin at Kunitachi College of Music in Tokyo. In 1978, she went to study with violist Nobuko Imai at the Royal Northern College of Music in Manchester, England. She was First Prize Winner at the 17th International Music Competition Budapest – Viola Competition. She is a member of the Fibonacci Sequence.

Inoue has served as principal violist for several orchestras, and has given recital and chamber music performances with such artists as Gidon Kremer and Jean-Jacques Kantorow.

She is a professor at the Royal Academy of Music and gives viola masterclasses throughout Europe and Japan.

Yuko Inoue plays a viola by Jean-Baptiste Vuillaume dated 1852.

== Selected discography ==
- Romanze: The Romantic Viola (2000), Black Box BBM1034
- Reynaldo Hahn: Chamber Music (2003), Hyperion CDA67391 – Soliloque et forlane for viola and piano (1937)
- John Hawkins: Voices from the Sea (2003), Meridian CDE84496 – Gestures and Shadows
- J.S. Bach: Sonatas for Viola da Gamba (2006), Quartz QTZR2050
- Mozart: String Quintets K174 & K515, with The Chilingirian Quartet, (2007), CRD 3521
- Mozart: String Quintets K516 & K406, with The Chilingirian Quartet, (2007), CRD 3522
- Benjamin Dale: The Romantic Viola: Suite; Phantasy; Introduction and Andante; Yuko Inoue (viola), Stephen Coombs (piano), Naxos 8.573167 (2013)
