= Silu Wang =

Chinese concert pianist (born 1995)

Silu Wang Chinese: 王丝路
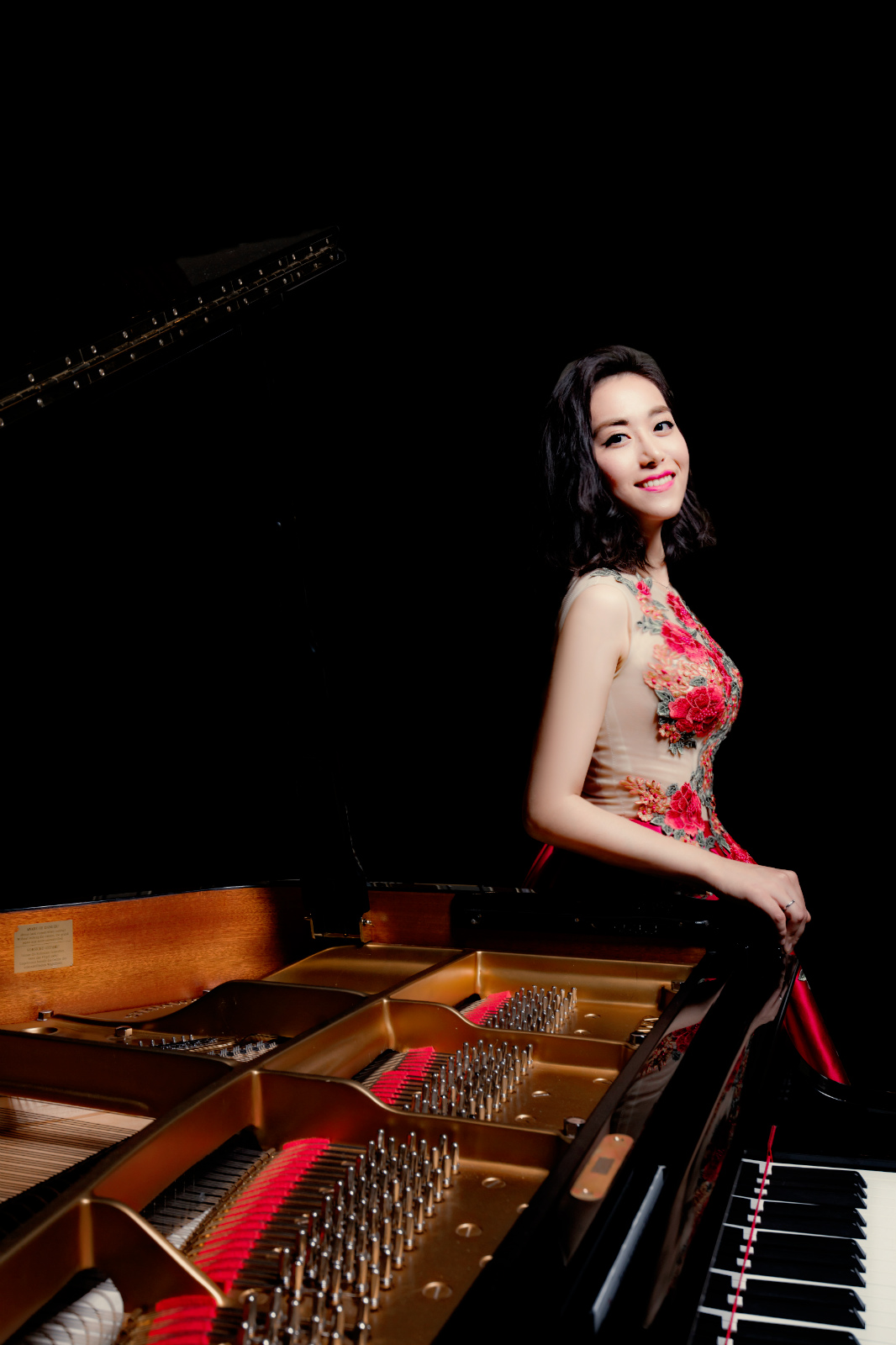

Background information
- Born: 1995 (age 29–30); China
- Origin: United Kingdom China
- Genres: Classical
- Occupation: Concert Pianist
- Website: http://wangsilu.com

Silu Wang (Chinese: 王丝路; pinyin: Wáng Sīlù; 1995 (age 29–30)) is a Chinese concert pianist who has performed in Europe and China. She is a Young Steinway Artist.

== Biography ==
She was born in China and studied piano under Weiling Chen (Shanghai Conservatory of Music) and Jianzhong Wang (Shanghai Conservatory of Music). She then moved to the UK, studied at the Royal Academy of Music with Ian Fountain then the Guildhall School of Music & Drama with Philip Jenkins, and the Royal College of Music with Edna Stern.

She was awarded in numerous competitions, including the Steinway & Sons National Youth Piano Competition, Springboard International Concerto Competition, “ISCHIA” International Piano Competition, and International Music Competition “Rome” Grand Prize Virtuoso.

In 2017, she was invited by composer Ben Burrows to help with the production and recording of the soundtrack as the only pianist for the first film made of the Warhorse story, 'A Couple of Downs and Outs' in Abbey Road Studio- a project sponsored by British Film Institute run in partnership with York St. John University.

She has released the following albums available on major music platforms including Spotify, Apple Music, Amazon Prime, Google Play Music, Tencent Music, NetEase Music.

== Discography (Albums, Singles and EPs) ==
Bach: Partita No. 1 (2020)

No.	Title	Length
1.	"Partita No. 1 in B-Flat Major, BWV 825: I. Praeludium"	01:52
2.	"Partita No. 1 in B-Flat Major, BWV 825: II. Allemande"	01:44
3.	"Partita No. 1 in B-Flat Major, BWV 825: III. Corrente"	01:25
4.	"Partita No. 1 in B-Flat Major, BWV 825: IV. Sarabande"	02:43
5.	"Partita No. 1 in B-Flat Major, BWV 825: V. Menuet I & II"	01:43
6.	"Partita No. 1 in B-Flat Major, BWV 825: VI. Gigue"	01:07
Total length:		10:34

Rendezvous Vol. 5 (2019)

No.	Title	Length
1.	"Fireworks Festival"	02:54
2.	"Hina Fading Away"	01:04
3.	"Sky Clearing Up"	02:16
4.	"K&A Welcoming Ceremony"	00:59
5.	"Grand Escape"	03:26
6.	"Is There Still Anything That Love Can Do?"	04:46
Total length:		15:25

Rendezvous Vol. 4 (2019)

No.	Title	Length
1.	"Do You?"	04:07
2.	"Kiss the Rain"	04:53
3.	"River Flows in You"	03:48
4.	"小小的手心"	04:22
5.	"潮鸣"	03:22
6.	"空之光"	03:47
7.	"风居住的街道"	04:22
8.	"贝加尔湖畔"	02:15
9.	"幻昼"	04:11
10.	"花之舞"	04:26
Total length:		39:53

Rendezvous, Vol. 3: Summer (2019)

No.	Title	Length
1.	"菊次郎的夏天：Summer"	02:20
2.	"圣诞快乐劳伦斯先生"	05:02
3.	"彩虹"	03:01
4.	"陈情令：无羁"	02:14
5.	"卡农"	05:27
6.	"The Truth that You Leave"	03:40
7.	"撒野"	03:52
8.	"撒野 广播剧主题曲"	03:34
9.	"爱乐之城：米娅与塞巴斯蒂安的主题曲"	02:04
10.	"曾经我也想过一了百了"	03:46
Total length:		35:00

Rendezvous Vol. 2: Always With Me (2019)

No.	Title	Length
1.	"千与千寻:永远同在(与你同在)"	04:08
2.	"红猪:逝去的往日(一去不复返的时光) ,赤红的飞翼"	02:44
3.	"Chaconne"	03:29
4.	"Spring"	03:05
5.	"蓝色生死恋 (Reason)"	04:33
6.	"慢慢喜欢你"	03:37
7.	"Luv Letter"	04:34
8.	"起风了,深夜食堂3:吃醋"	02:21
9.	"我只在乎你"	04:07
10.	"不能说的秘密:蒲公英的约定"	02:31
Total length:		35:16

Fantasy Waltzes Live Concert (2018)

No.	Title	Length
1.	"Fantasy Waltzes: No. 1 in a-Flat Major. Tempo rubato e capriccioso"	02:52
2.	"Fantasy Waltzes: No. 2 in B-Flat Major. Scherzando"	01:27
3.	"Fantasy Waltzes: No. 3 in E Minor. Moderato"	01:59
4.	"Fantasy Waltzes: No. 4 in B Major. Grazioso"	02:21
5.	"Fantasy Waltzes: No. 5 in a-Flat Major. Lento"	03:04
6.	"Fantasy Waltzes: No. 6 in C Major. Allegro giocoso"	05:16
7.	"Fantasy Waltzes: No. 7 in a Minor. Lento"	03:26
8.	"Fantasy Waltzes: No. 8 in G Major. Vivace ma ritmico"	01:14
9.	"Fantasy Waltzes: No. 9 in C Minor. Lento e lugubre"	04:23
10.	"Fantasy Waltzes: No. 10 in F-Sharp Major. In tempo piacevole"	01:26
11.	"Fantasy Waltzes: No. 11 in a Major. Presto"	04:49
Total length:		32:22

Rendezvous Vol. 1: The Path of Wind (2018)

No.	Title	Length
1.	"小时代3:时间煮雨"	03:09
2.	"你的名字:约会"	02:21
3.	"大鱼海棠:大鱼"	03:06
4.	"延禧攻略:雪落下的声音"	02:36
5.	"一起来看流星雨:一个人的浪漫"	02:51
6.	"千与千寻:那个夏天"	03:32
7.	"天空之城:伴随着你,空中降临的少女"	02:20
8.	"魔女宅急便:风之丘陵,季节的交替"	04:09
9.	"龙猫:风之甬道"	02:45
10.	"犬夜叉:穿越时空的思念"	02:53
Total length:		29:46

Contemporary Classical Piano Solo (2017)

No.	Title	Length
1.	"Sonata Alla Toccata: Mvt. I. Maestoso: Allegro ritmico e jubilante"	03:34
2.	"Sonata Alla Toccata: Mvt. II. Andante con moto e semplice"	02:47
3.	"Sonata Alla Toccata: Mvt. III. Molto vivace"	04:04
Total length:		10:26

Suite, Op. 14, Sz. 62, BB 70 (2016)

No.	Title	Length
1.	"Suite, Op. 14, Sz. 62, BB 70: I. Allegretto"	02:11
2.	"Suite, Op. 14, Sz. 62, BB 70: II. Scherzo"	01:58
3.	"Suite, Op. 14, Sz. 62, BB 70: III. Allegro molto"	02:16
4.	"Suite, Op. 14, Sz. 62, BB 70: IV. Sostenuto"	03:04
Total length:		09:31
