= Thomas Brandis =

German violinist

- Born: 23 June 1935; Hamburg, Germany
- Died: 30 March 2017 (aged 81)
- Genre: Classical
- Occupations: Concertmaster of the Berlin Philharmonic (1961-1983), violin professor
- Instrument: Violin
- Formerly of: Berlin Philharmonic

Thomas Brandis (Hamburg, 23 June 1935 – 30 March 2017) was a German violinist, chamber music performer, pedagogue and former concertmaster of the Berlin Philharmonic.

== Biography ==
Born in Hamburg (Germany) in 1935, Brandis trained as a violinist in Hamburg and later in London with Max Rostal. After winning the first of the International ARD Competition he was concertmaster in Hamburg, moving later to Berlin to play with the Berlin Philharmonic. He became concertmaster of the Berlin Philharmonic at age 26, and served in the position until 1983. In 1976 he founded the Brandis-Quartet, which has performed virtually in all major festivals in Europe, Japan and the Americas. Thomas Brandis recorded for EMI, Deutsche Grammophon, Teldec, Orfeo, and Harmonia Mundi.

Thomas Brandis was a professor of violin at the Berlin University of the Arts until 2002, and a visiting professor at the Royal Academy of Music in London and the Musikhochschule in Lübeck.

He died on 30 March 2017 at the age of 81.
