= Curtis Price =

American professor (born 1945)

Curtis Alexander Price, KBE (born 1945, in Springfield, Missouri, USA) was Warden of New College, Oxford, from October 2009 to September 2016. He was previously principal of the Royal Academy of Music from 1995 to 2008 and Professor of Music in the University of London. He retired as Warden of New College in August 2016.

Price was raised in Charleston, Illinois, and received his undergraduate musical training at Southern Illinois University Carbondale. He attained a Ph.D from Harvard University. He moved to the United Kingdom in 1981 to teach at King's College London, latterly as head of department. Price is a trustee of Musica Britannica, the Handel House Museum and the British Library Sound Archive, a governor of the Purcell School and a Patron of Bampton Classical Opera. During his tenure as principal of the Royal Academy of Music, the academy became a full school of the University of London, it developed collaborations with Juilliard School (New York) and other music schools abroad, it acquired important archives (including the Foyle Menuhin archive) and in 2005 it acquired the "Viotti ex-Bruce" Stradivari violin.

In 2005, Price was appointed honorary Knight Commander of the Order of the British Empire (KBE) for services to music. The knighthood was made substantive in the New Year Honours List 2006.

He is married to Rhian Samuel, a composer.
