= Denis Wright (composer) =

English brass band composer and conductor (1895–1967)

Dr Denis Wright OBE
- Born: 22 February 1895; Kensington, London, England
- Died: 20 April 1967 (aged 72)

Denis Wright, OBE (22 February 1895 – 20 April 1967) was an English composer and conductor of brass band music.

Wright was born in Kensington, London, and moved to Wembley with his family when he was five. He attended St George's School, Harpenden. He began musical studies at the Royal College of Music but interrupted his studies to serve in the British Army in Macedonia during World War I.

Wright began working as a schoolteacher of modern languages in East Grinstead, and in 1925, he entered and won a competition to compose a brass band piece for use in the National Brass Band Championships. He continued to write occasional test pieces for the championships and began teaching music at his old school, St George's. He was offered a job as an editor at the music publishers Chappell & Co. in 1930. In 1933, the BBC asked him to form a band section in the Music Department. At the outbreak of World War II, the BBC transferred Wright to Glasgow, during which time he undertook a doctorate study in music at the University of Edinburgh.

In 1942, he returned to London to join the BBC Overseas Service. By the late 1940s, his conducting engagements were irregular however he still appeared on BBC programmes and at massed band concerts organised with Harry Mortimer. He wrote a book on brass band conducting, and travelled through Europe, Australia and New Zealand where he was in much demand to adjudicate brass band contests. He left the BBC in 1955, aged 60, and although officially retired, worked frequently with the National Youth Brass Band of Great Britain, which had been formed on his suggestion.

In 1959, Wright was awarded an OBE in the New Year Honours. In 1965 and 1966, he received Honours from the Royal Academy of Music, which made him an Honorary Member of the Academy.
