= Duncan McTier =

English double-bassist

Duncan McTier is an English double bass soloist and professor. He is a member of the Fibonacci Sequence.

== Biography ==
Born in Worcestershire, England, Duncan McTier studied a degree in mathematics at Bristol University before joining the BBC Symphony Orchestra and the Netherlands Chamber Orchestra. McTier won the Isle of Man International Double Bass Competition in 1982 and since then he has performed often with many orchestras, including the Academy of St. Martin in the Fields, Royal Scottish National Orchestra, English Chamber Orchestra, Scottish Chamber Orchestra, BBC Scottish Symphony Orchestra, Concertgebouw Chamber Orchestra, RTVE Symphony Orchestra and the Orchestre de Chambre de Lausanne.

He recorded a series of albums with the pianist Kathron Sturrock.

In November 2014 McTier received a non-custodial sentence after pleading guilty to two indecent assaults and one attempted indecent assault, during the 1980s and 1990s, on former students aged between 17 and 23.

From 1996-2014 McTier was a professor of double bass at the Royal Academy of Music in London and is currently professor at the Queen Sofía College of Music in Madrid, Spain. In 2019, McTier retired from Zürcher Hochschule der Künste in Zürich.
