= Rachel Gough =

British classical bassoonist

Rachel Gough FRAM is a British classical bassoonist. She has been Principal Bassoon of the London Symphony Orchestra since 1999 and was Co-Principal Bassoon of the BBC Symphony Orchestra from 1991 to 1999.

Gough studied anthropology and music at King's College, Cambridge and subsequently studied bassoon at the Royal Academy of Music and the Hochschule für Musik und Theater Hannover with Klaus Thunemann. During this time she was principal bassoon of the European Union Youth Orchestra and won the gold medal at the Royal Over-Seas League Annual Music Competition.

Gough was Professor of Bassoon at the Royal Academy of Music from 1991 to 1999 and was elected a Fellow of the Royal Academy of Music in 2002, an honour "awarded to alumni who have distinguished themselves within their field, commanding national or international recognition, or who have given exceptional service to the Academy" and limited to 300 musicians.

As a woodwind principal, Gough performs in majority of LSO concerts and has recorded extensively with the orchestra. As a chamber musician, Gough participated in a project by Cala Records to record the complete wind chamber music of Debussy, Saint-Saëns and Ravel.

Gough has featured in several programmes on BBC Radio 3 as both a soloist and as a presenter.
