= Mark Wildman (singer) =

Mark Wildman is an English bass, professor and head of voice studies at the Royal Academy of Music.

== Biography ==
Wildman was a chorister at the Gloucester Cathedral, after which he joined the Royal Academy of Music where he studied with Henry Cummings, Rex Stephens and Rupert Bruce Lockhart. After winning some competitions Wildman began his career as a member of the BBC Singers. As a soloist he has performed in the UK, Europe and America.

Mark Wildman has been a professor of voice at the Royal Academy of Music since 1982 and Head of Vocal Studies since 1991.
