= William Wildman (footballer) =

English footballer

Personal information
- Date of birth: 30 November 1883
- Place of birth: Liverpool, England
- Date of death: ?
- Position: Defender

Senior career*
Years	Team	Apps	(Gls)
1904–1906	Everton	2	(0)
1906–1908	West Ham United	39	(0)
- * Club domestic league appearances and goals as of 17:30, 23 February 2012 (UTC)

William Wildman (born 30 November 1883 – ?) was an English footballer who played as a right-back for Everton and West Ham United.

== Club career ==
Wildman started with Everton making his debut on 28 January 1905 against Middlesbrough. He played only two games for Everton before being signed by manager Syd King for West Ham United in 1906. He missed only one game in his first season with West Ham but in the second game of the following season, against Tottenham Hotspur, he was injured. He had made only forty-one appearances in all competitions before retiring due to his injuries.
