= William Beauchamp Wildman =

British teacher and historian

William Beauchamp Wildman (1852–1922) was a British teacher and historian. He taught at Westminster School, Sherborne School, where he was Housemaster of Abbey House from 1893 until 1908.
