= Roy Newsome =

British conductor and broadcaster (1930–2011)

Roy Newsome (17 July 1930 in Elland, Yorkshire – 10 October 2011 in Bury, England) was a British conductor, composer, arranger, broadcaster, music educator, and cornet player.

As a conductor, he was associated with the Black Dyke Mills Band (1966–1977), Besses o 'th' Barn (1978–1985), Fairey Engineering Band (1986–1989) and the Sun Life Band (1989–1996). With these leading brass bands he experienced many successes, including five winning performances in the "British Open Championships" and a winning performance in the "National Brass Band Championships." Several of the bands he led won the British Broadcasting Corporation's "BBC Band of the Year" award. He was also chief conductor of the National Youth Brass Band of Great Britain for 17 years.

For eight years he was the host of the program "Listen to the Band" on BBC Radio 2.

As a composer and arranger, he published around 100 works, including works for brass band and concert band, and several pieces of chamber music.
