= Maurice Murphy (musician) =

English trumpeter (1935–2010)

Maurice Murphy MBE
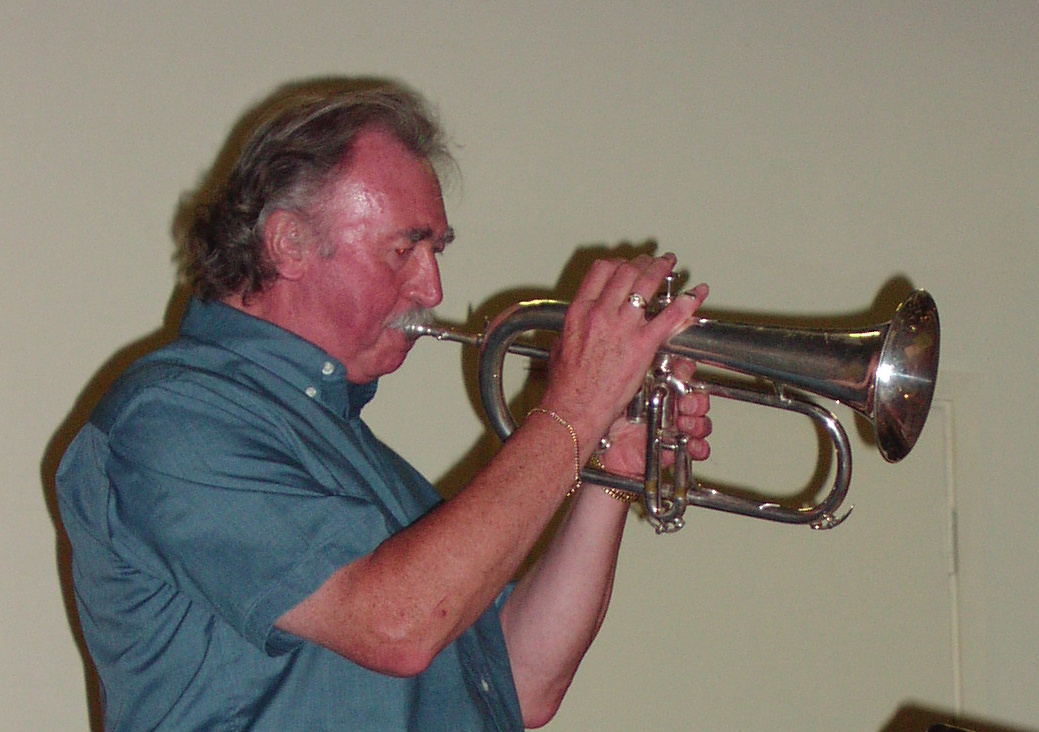
- Murphy playing flugelhorn in 2002

Background information
- Born: Maurice Harrison Murphy; 7 August 1935; Hammersmith, London
- Died: 28 October 2010 (aged 75)
- Occupation: Classical musician
- Instruments: Trumpet, cornet
- Formerly of: London Symphony Orchestra

Maurice Harrison Murphy MBE (7 August 1935 – 28 October 2010) was a British musician who was principal trumpet of the London Symphony Orchestra from 1977 to 2007.

== Biography ==
He was born in Hammersmith in 1935, and his father drove a coal wagon. He grew up playing in brass bands in Yorkshire, and notably was Principal Cornet of the world-famous Black Dyke Mills Band from 1956 to 1961. His transition from brass bands to orchestral work was helped with stints with the Hallé, the Royal Liverpool Philharmonic Orchestra and the Lemare Orchestra. He held the position of Principal Trumpet with the BBC Northern Symphony Orchestra (now the BBC Philharmonic Orchestra) from 1961 and in 1977 joined the London Symphony Orchestra (LSO) as Principal Trumpet, a position he held for 30 years until his retirement in 2007.

Murphy has played on film soundtracks including the first six Star Wars films (his first role as Principal Trumpet in the LSO), Superman: The Movie, Raiders of the Lost Ark, Gangs of New York, Johnny English, Reign of Fire, a solo in Mr. Holland’s Opus, Philadelphia, Batman, the Alien movies, Frankenstein, Gladiator, Who Framed Roger Rabbit, We Were Soldiers and many more.

Murphy officially retired from the orchestra on 16 October 2000 but continually had his contract renewed between then and his real retirement on 3 June 2007. His last concert as principal trumpet of the LSO was in a performance of Elgar's The Dream of Gerontius, conducted by Richard Hickox.

== Honours ==
In 2008 Murphy received the honorary award of the International Trumpet Guild, given to those "who have made extraordinary contributions to the art of trumpet playing".

He was appointed Member of the Order of the British Empire (MBE) in the 2010 New Year Honours.

== Death ==
Maurice Murphy died on 28 October 2010, aged 75.
