= Trombone repertoire =

Set of available musical works for trombone

This page lists classical pieces in the trombone repertoire, including solo works, concertenti and chamber music of which trombone plays a significant part.

== Solo trombone ==
- Hans Abrahamsen, Kharon (2009)
- Kalevi Aho, Solo XIII (2017)
- Louis Andriessen, Toespraak for Speaking Trombonist (1979)
- Georges Aperghis, Ruinen (1994)
- Malcolm Arnold, Fantasy, Op. 101 (1969)
- Richard Barrett, basalt, (1990-91)
- Leslie Bassett, Suite (1957)
- Luciano Berio, Sequenza V (1966)
- Leonard Bernstein, Elegy for Mippy II (1948)
- Howard J. Buss, A Day in the City (1986), Camel Music (1975), On the Stroke of Midnight (2021)
- John Cage, Solo for Sliding Trombone (1957-1958)
- Elliott Carter, Retracing V (2011)
- David Cope, Three Pieces (1966)
- David Cope, B.T.R.B. for Bass Trombonist (1971)
- Peter Maxwell Davies, Judas Mercator (2004)
- David Del Tredici, The Felix Variations for Bass Trombone (2010)
- Franco Donatoni, Scaglie (1992)
- Pascal Dusapin, Indeed (1987)
- Einar Englund, Panorama (1976)
- Luca Francesconi, Respiro (1987)
- Vinko Globokar, Échanges (1973)
- Vinko Globokar, Oblak semen (1996)
- Tom Johnson, Sequenza minimalista (1993)
- Tom Johnson, Tilework (2003)
- Alvin Lucier, Stacks for Trombone, Multimedia and Sculpture (1993)
- Allen Molineux, Manipulations (1972)
- Vincent Persichetti, Parable XVIII, Op. 133 (1975)
- Folke Rabe, Basta (1982)
- Frederic Rzewski, Last Judgement (1969)
- Giacinto Scelsi, Tre pezzi (1957)
- Karlheinz Stockhausen, In Freundschaft, Nr. 46^{12}/_{13} (1977)
- Karlheinz Stockhausen, Signale zur Invasion, 2. ex Nr. 61 (1992)
- Christian Wolff, Peggy (1993)
- Iannis Xenakis, Keren (1986)
- Emmett Yoshioka, EXTASE (1969)

== Trombone and piano ==
- Bert Appermont, Sketches of Spring (2005)
- Bert Appermont, Colors for Trombone (2008)
- Leslie Bassett, Sonata (1954)
- William Bolcom, Trombone Concerto (2016)
- Howard J. Buss, Trombone Concerto (1985), Trek! (1999), Sonata Lyrique (2020)
- Vladislav Blazhevich, Concerto No. 1, Concerto No. 2 (1924), Concerto No. 3, Concerto No. 4, Concerto No. 5, Concerto No. 6, Concerto No. 7, Concerto No. 8, Concerto No. 9 (1926), Concerto No. 10, Concerto No. 11, Concerto No. 12, Concerto No. 13, 10 Concert Pieces (1935)
- John Cage, Two^{5} (1991)
- Henry Cowell, Hymn and Fuguing Tune No. 13 (1960)
- James Curnow, Fantasy for Trombone (1992)
- Jean-Michel Defaye, Deux Danses (1950)
- Léo Delibes, Morceau à déchiffrer (1887)
- Edison Denisov, Choral Varié (1975)
- Pierre Max Dubois, Histoires de trombone (1978)
- Pierre Max Dubois, Menuet d’automne (1978)
- Pierre Max Dubois, La danse du hérisson (1980)
- Henri Dutilleux, Choral, cadence et fugato (1950)
- Gala Flagello, Memory Home (2023)
- Gala Flagello, A Crab, A Quill (2022)
- Gala Flagello, Comments by Computers (2021)
- Launy Grøndahl, Concerto for Trombone (1924)
- Alexandre Guilmant , Morceau Symphonique, Op.88 (1902)
- Jennifer Higdon, Legacy, version C (1999)
- Paul Hindemith, Trombone Sonata (1941)
- Vagn Holmboe, Trombone Sonata, Op. 172a (1987)
- Søren Hyldgaard, Rapsodia Borealis (2001)
- Arthur Honegger, Hommage du trombone exprimant la tristesse de l'auteur absent (1925)
- Alan Hovhaness, O World, Op. 32, No. 2 (1960)
- Joseph Jongen, Aria et polonaise, Op.128 (1944)
- Ernst Krenek, 5 Pièces (1967)
- György Kurtág, Six Pieces (1999)
- Alvin Lucier, Panorama (1993)
- Otto Luening' Sonata (1953)
- Frank Martin, Ballade (1940)
- Johan de Meij, Canticles (2007)
- Allen Molineux Sonata (2023)
- Lior Navok Samsara (2020)
- Pauline Oliveros, The Gender of Now: There But Not There (2005)
- Guy Ropartz, Pièce (1908)
- Camille Saint-Saëns, Cavatine, Op. 144 (1915)
- Alexander Tcherepnin, Andante, Op. 64 (1939)
- Carl Maria von Weber, Romanza appassionata in C minor (doubtful authenticity)
- Christian Wolff, Ruth (1991)
- Shai Cohen, Remez (2021)

== Trombone choir ==
- Bert Appermont, Golden Glow for 4 Trombones (2013)
- Gilbert Amy, Posaunen for 4 Trombones (1987)
- Louis Andriessen, Rage, rage against the dying of the light for 4 Trombones (1966)
- Alexander Arutiunian, Dance for 4 Trombones (1989)
- Leslie Bassett, Quartet for 4 Trombones (1949)
- Leslie Bassett, 12 Duos for 2 or 4 Trombones (1974)
- Leslie Bassett, Three Equale for 4 Trombones (1996)
- Ludwig van Beethoven, Drei Equale für vier Posaunen, WoO 30 for 4 Trombones (1812)
- Anton Bruckner, Two Aequali, WAB 114 & 149 for 3 Trombones (1847)
- Howard J. Buss, Odyssey for 4 Trombones (1987), Levi's Dream for 4 Trombones (2011), Brom Bones for 8 Trombones (2010), Showdown for 10 Trombones (1987), Prayer for 12 Trombones (2015), Trombone Graffiti for 4 Trombones (2016),
- Vladislav Blazhevich, Impromptu for 12 Trombones (1915), Fantasy for 12 Trombones (1920s)
- Michael Daugherty, Steamboat for Trombone Choir (2014)
- Pierre Max Dubois, Cahin-caha for 2 Trombones (1978)
- Pierre Max Dubois, A petits pas for 3 Trombones (1978)
- Pierre Max Dubois, A toute coulisse for 4 Trombones (1978)
- Pierre Max Dubois, Easy sliding for 8 Trombones
- Pascal Dusapin, Sly for 4 Trombones (1987)
- Karlheinz Essl, Faites vos jeux! for 4-8 Trombones (2004)
- Christopher Fox, stone.wind.rain.sun^{1} for 4 Trombones (1990)
- Vinko Globokar, Discours II for 5 Trombones (1968)
- Gordon Jacob, Octet for 8 Trombones (1981)
- Georg Friedrich Haas, Octet for 8 Trombones (2015)
- Alois Hába, Suite in quarter-tones, Op. 72 for 4 Trombones (1944)
- Luca Lombardi, Proporzioni for 4 Trombones (1969)
- Luca Lombardi, Mirum for 4 Trombones (1984)
- Per Nørgård, Krystaller-Massiver-Kaskader for 12 Trombones (2004)
- Arvo Pärt, Summa for 4 Trombones (2008)
- Rolf Riehm, No Velvet Mute For Lullabies for 4 Trombones (2005)
- Frederic Rzewski, Last Judgement, version for several Trombones (1969)
- Manfred Stahnke, COWS & BELLS for 8 Trombones (1995)
- Charles Wuorinen, Consort of Four Trombones (1960)

== Trombone and instrument(s) ==
- Kalevi Aho, Epilogue for Trombone and Organ (1998)
- Richard Barrett, EARTH for Trombone and Percussionist (1987-88)
- Richard Barrett, Aurora for Quartertone Flugelhorn and Alto Trombone (2005-10)
- Leslie Bassett, Concerto Lirico (1983)
- Harrison Birtwistle, Duet 5, for Horn and Trombone (2014)
- Hayo Boerema, Mutations for Trombone and Organ (2022)
- John Cage, Five^{3} for Trombone and String Quartet (1991)
- Friedrich Cerha, Quintett for Trombone and String Quartet (2005)
- Friedrich Cerha, Malinconia for Baritone and Trombone (2007)
- Ikuma Dan, Three Letters for Trombone and Harp (1999)
- Iancu Dumitrescu, Nimbus I-III for Trombone(s), Percussion and Tape (1984)
- Peter Maxwell Davies, Aloha Hunter for Trombone and Clarinet (1966)
- David Del Tredici, Dynamic Duo for Bass Trombone and Violin (2013)
- David Del Tredici, David for Bass Trombone and Violin (2015)
- Edward Elgar, Duett for trombone and double bass (1887)
- Karlheinz Essl, exit*glue for Trombone and Electric Guitar (2016)
- Christopher Fox, Hidden Consequences for Microtonal Horn, Trombone and Microtonal Tuba (2009-10)
- Johannes Fritsch, 12'99–01'00 for Trombone and Percussion (2000)
- Beat Furrer, spazio immergente for Soprano and Trombone (2015)
- Gérard Grisey, Solo Pour Deux for Clarinet and Trombone (1981)
- Alois Hába, Suite, Op. 56 for Quarter-tone Trumpet and Trombone (1944)
- Vagn Holmboe, Notater, Op. 140 for 3 Trombones and Tuba (1979)
- Gustav Holst, Duo Concertante for Trombone and Organ (1894)
- Alan Hovhaness, Mysterious Horse Before the Gate, Op. 205 for Trombone and 5 Percussions (1977)
- Jan Koetsier, Partita "Wachet auf, ruft uns die Stimme" for Trombone and Organ, Opus 41/3 (1976)
- Alvin Lucier, Bar Lazy J for Tenor Trombone and Clarinet (2003)
- Johan de Meij, Two-Bone Concerto for 2 Trombones and Piano (2016)
- Octavian Nemescu, Finalpha for Trombone, Percussion and Tape (1990)
- Larry Polansky, Two Children's Songs for Trombone and Tuba (1992)
- Larry Polansky, Three Pieces for Trombone and Tuba (2011)
- Roger Reynolds, ...from behind the unreasoning mask for Trombone, Percussion and Electroacoustic Sound (1974-75)
- Corrado Maria Saglietti, Suite for Alto Trombone and String Quartet (1993)
- R. Murray Schafer, Music for Wilderness Lake for 12 Trombones (1979)
- Ernst Schiffmann, Intermezzo for Trombone and Organ, Opus 53
- Florent Schmitt, Quartet, Op. 109 for 3 Trombones and Tuba (1946)
- Enjott Schneider, Golgatha. Introduction and Chaconne for Trombone and Organ (2010)
- Alfred Schnittke, Schall und Hall for Trombone and Organ (1983)
- Josef Tal, Duo for Trombone and Harp (1989)
- Joan Tower, Elegy for Trombone and String Quartet (1993)
- Christian Wolff, Dark as a Dungeon for Trombone and Double Bass (1977)
- Charles Wuorinen, Archangel for Bass Trombone and String Quartet (1977)
- Charles Wuorinen, Trombone Trio for Trombone, Mallet Instruments and Piano (1985)
- Iannis Xenakis, Zythos for Trombone and 6 Percussionists (1996)

== Trombone and ensemble ==
- Bert Appermont, Colors for Trombone for Trombone and Concert Band (1998)
- Richard Barrett, basalt-E for Trombone, Percussionist and Strings (1990-92)
- William Bolcom, Trombone Concerto for Trombone and Concert Band (2016)
- Steven Bryant, Trombone Concerto for Trombone, Orchestral Winds, and Percussion (2016)
- Friedrich Cerha, Musik for Trombone and Strings (2005)
- Simon Dobson, Shift (2012)
- Franco Donatoni, Sweet Basil for Trombone and Big Band (1993)
- Peter Eötvös, Paris-Dakar for Trombone, Brass and Percussion (2000)
- Jean Françaix, Concerto pour trombone et 10 instruments à vent (1983)
- Vinko Globokar, Kolo for Trombone, Mixed Choir and Electronics (1988)
- Vinko Globokar, Eppure si muove for Trombone and 11 instruments (2003)
- Launy Grøndahl, Concerto for Trombone, version for Trombone and Concert Band / Brass Band (1924)
- Alan Hovhaness, Symphony No. 34, Op. 310 for Bass Trombone and Strings (1977)
- Alan Hovhaness, Diran (the Religious Singer), Concerto No. 3, Op. 94 for Baritone Trombone and Strings (1948)
- Søren Hyldgaard, Rapsodia Borealis for Trombone and Wind Orchestra (2001)
- Ladislav Kupkovič, Fleisch des Kreuzes (mäso kriza) for Trombone and 10 Percussions (1962)
- David Lang, men for Amplified Trombone and Ensemble (2001)
- Gordon Langford, Rhapsody (for Don Lusher) (1978)
- Eric Leidzen, Concertino (1955)
- Alvin Lucier, Copied Lines, previously Panorama II for Trombone and Strings (2011)
- John Mackey, Harvest: Concerto for Trombone for Trombone and Wind Ensemble (2009)
- David Maslanka, Trombone Concerto for Trombone and Wind Ensemble (2007)
- Johan de Meij, T-Bone Concerto for Trombone and Wind Orchestra / Brass Band (1996)
- Johan de Meij, Canticles for Bass Trombone and Wind Orchestra / Brass Band (2007)
- Darius Milhaud, Concertino d'hiver, Op. 327 for Trombone and String Orchestra (1953)
- Arvo Pärt, Fratres for Trombone, String Orchestra and Percussion (1993)
- Nikolai Rimsky-Korsakov, Concerto for Trombone and Military Band (1877)
- Peter Ruzicka, STILL for Trombone and Ensemble (2016)
- Frederic Rzewski, Moonrise with Memories for Bass Trombone and 6 Instruments (1978)
- Gunther Schuller, Eine Klein Posaunenmusik for Trombone and Ensemble (1980)
- Marco Stroppa, From Needle's Eye for Trombone, Double Quintet and Percussion (1996-2001)
- Charles Wuorinen, Archaeopteryx for Bass Trombone and 10 Players (1978)
- Ellen Taaffe Zwilich, Concerto for Bass Trombone, Strings, Timpani and Cymbals (1989)

== Trombone and orchestra ==
- Kalevi Aho, Symphony No. 9 (1993-94)
- Kalevi Aho, Trombone Concerto (2010)
- Johann Georg Albrechtsberger, Trombone Concerto in B♭ major (1769)
- Bert Appermont, Colors for Trombone
- Alexander Arutiunian, Concerto for Trombone (1991)
- Luciano Berio, SOLO (1999)
- Ernest Bloch, Symphony for Trombone and Orchestra (1954)
- William Bolcom, Trombone Concerto (2016)
- Carlos Chávez, Concerto for Trombone (1976-77)
- Ferdinand David, Concertino for Trombone, Op. 4 (1837)
- Pascal Dusapin, Watt (1994)
- Rolf Gehlhaar, Lamina! (1977)
- Launy Grøndahl, Concerto for Trombone (1924)
- Georg Friedrich Haas, Trombone Concerto (2016)
- Michael Haydn, Larghetto per il trombone concertato in F major (1763?)
- Michael Haydn, Trombone Concerto in D major (1764)
- Vagn Holmboe, Concerto No. 12, Op. 52 (1950)
- Søren Hyldgaard, Concerto Borealis (2001)
- Gordon Jacob, Concerto for Trombone (1956)
- Jouni Kaipainen, Life is..., Trombone Concerto, Op.100 (2014)
- James MacMillan, Trombone Concerto (2016)
- Frank Martin, Ballade (1940–41)
- Leopold Mozart, Trombone Concerto from Serenade in G major (1762)
- Michael Nyman, Concerto for Trombone (1995)
- Arvo Pärt, An den Wassern zu Babel saßen wir und weinten for Trombone and Chamber Orchestra (1995)
- Wolfgang Rihm, Canzona per sonare (1952)
- Nikolay Rimsky-Korsakov, Trombone Concerto (1877)
- Nino Rota, Concerto per Trombone (1966)
- Christopher Rouse, Trombone Concerto (1991)
- Jan Sandström, Motorcykelkonserten, Trombone Concerto No. 1 (1988-89)
- Jan Sandström, Don Quixote, Trombone Concerto No. 2 (1994)
- Kazimierz Serocki, Trombone Concerto (1953)
- Nathaniel Shilkret, Concerto for Trombone (1942)
- Toru Takemitsu, Fantasma/Cantos II (1994)
- Jukka Tiensuu, Suuna, Trombone Concerto (2017)
- Melinda Wagner, Concerto for Trombone (2007)
- Georg Christoph Wagenseil, Trombone Concerto in E♭ major (1755?)
- Iannis Xenakis, Troorkh (1991)
- Takashi Yoshimatsu, Orion Machine, Trombone Concerto (1993)
- Ellen Taaffe Zwilich, Trombone Concerto (1988)

== Trombone, soloist(s) and ensemble / orchestra ==
- Michael Daugherty, Rosa Parks Boulevard for 3 Trombones and Orchestra / Symphonic Band (2014)
- Beat Furrer, spazio immergente III for Soprano, Trombone and Strings (2019)
- Michael Haydn, Concertino in D major for Horn, Trombone and Orchestra (1767)
- Jennifer Higdon, Low Brass Concerto for 2 Tenor Trombones, Bass Trombone, Tuba and Orchestra (2017)
- Helmut Lachenmann, NUN for Flute, Trombone, Male Choir and Orchestra (1999)
- Johan de Meij, Two-Bone Concerto for 2 Trombones and Wind Orchestra / Brass Band (2016)
- Leopold Mozart, Serenade for Trumpet, Trombone and Orchestra (1762)
- Pauline Oliveros, The Heart of Tones - Mixed realities for Trombones, Voices & Ensemble in Mixed Reality (2008)
- Arvo Pärt, Pari intervallo for Clarinet, Trombone and String Orchestra (1976)
- Toru Takemitsu, Gémeaux for Oboe, Trombone and 2 Orchestras (1971-86)
- Georg Christoph Wagenseil, Memoriam from Confitebor for Trombone, Alto and Orchestra (1760?)

== Electronic / Electroacoustic ==
- Barry Anderson, Sound The Tucket Sonance And The Note To Mount for Trombone and Tape (1980)
- Richard Barrett, mask for Trombone and Optional Electronics (2017-18)
- Richard Barrett, membrane for Trombone and Electronics (2017-19)
- Howard J. Buss, Alien Loop de Loops for Trombone or Bass trombone and electronic recording (2015)
- Karlheinz Essl, Si! for Trombone, Live Electronics and Surround Sound (2012)
- Christopher Fox, Recirculation for Bass Trombone and Tape (1981-82)
- Christopher Fox, stone.wind.rain.sun^{1} for Trombone and Tape (1990)
- Luca Francesconi, Animus for Trombone and Live Electronics (1995-96)
- Rolf Gehlhaar, Rondell for Trombone and Delay (1975)
- Vinko Globokar, Prestop II for Trombone and Electronics (1991)
- Jonathan Harvey, Ricercare una melodia for Trombone and Electronics (1984)
- Alvin Lucier, Wind Shadows for Trombone and Pure Wave Oscillators (1994)
- Octavian Nemescu, IN PAR for Trombone and Tape (1988)
- Phill Niblock, A Trombone Piece for Taped Trombone (1977)
- Phill Niblock, A Third Trombone for Taped Trombone (1979)
- Pauline Oliveros, Theater Piece for Trombone Player for Trombone, Pipes and Tape (1966)
- Pauline Oliveros, The Heart of Tones for Trombone and Electronics (1999)
- Pauline Oliveros, Red Shifts for Trombone, Oscillators and Noise (2000)
- Pauline Oliveros, Big Room for Trombone and Expanded Instrument System (2003)
- Wolfgang von Schweinitz, JUZ (a Yodel Cry), Op. 40 for Trombone and Echo Sounds (1999/2009)
- Karlheinz Stockhausen, Signale zur Invasion, 2. ex Nr. 61 for Trombone and Electronics (1992)
- Marco Stroppa, I will not kiss your f.ing flag for Trombone and Electronics (2005)
