= Trombone concerto =

Concerto for solo trombone and instrumental ensemble

A trombone concerto is a concerto for solo trombone and instrumental ensemble, customarily the orchestra. The vast majority of trombone concertos, especially those which are staples of trombone repertoire, also have piano reductions available.

== Selected examples ==
- Leopold Mozart
  - Alto Trombone Concerto (1756)
- Bert Appermont
  - Colors for Trombone (1998)
- Ferdinand David
  - Trombone Concertino (1837)
- Launy Grøndahl
  - Trombone Concerto (1924)
- James MacMillan
  - Trombone Concerto (2016)
- Johan de Meij
  - T-Bone Concerto (1996)
- Nikolai Rimsky-Korsakov
  - Trombone Concerto (1877)
- Nino Rota
  - Trombone Concerto in C (1966)
- Christopher Rouse
  - Trombone Concerto (1991)
- Jan Sandström
  - Motorbike Odyssey (1989)
- Nathaniel Shilkret
  - Trombone Concerto (1942)
- Melinda Wagner
  - Trombone Concerto (2007)
- Iannis Xenakis
  - Troorkh (1991)
- Chick Corea
  - Concerto for Trombone (2020)
- Tan Dun
  - Trombone Concerto (Three Muses in Video Game) (2021)
- Vladislav Blazhevich
  - Concerto No. 2 (1933)
- Derek Bourgeois
  - Concerto for Trombone (1989)
