= Queisser =

Queisser is a German surname. Notable people with the surname include:

- Hans-Joachim Queisser (1931–2025), German physicist
- Karl Traugott Queisser (1800–1846), German trombone and viola player
