= List of compositions by Vladislav Blazhevich =

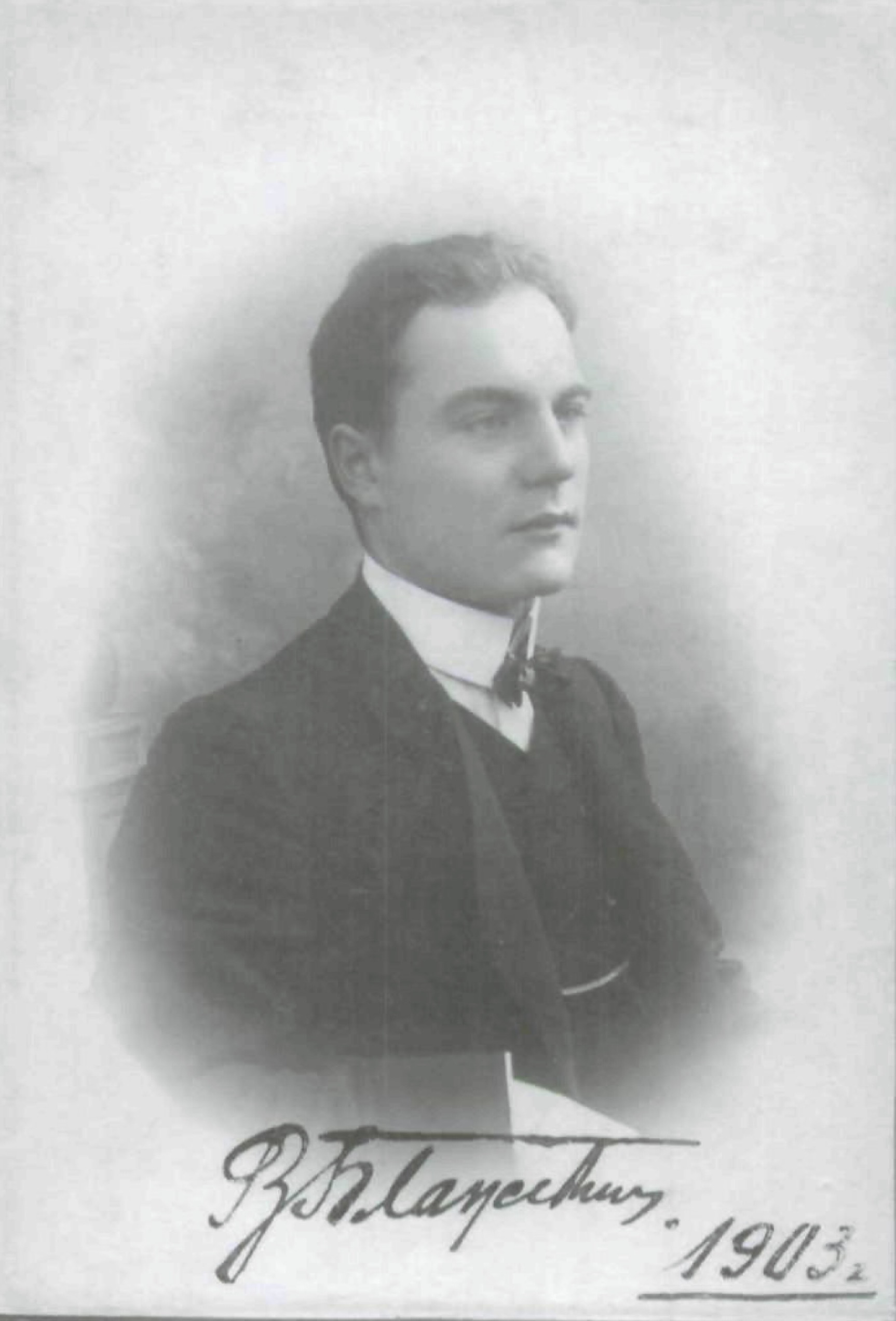
Blazhevich in 1903

Vladislav Blazhevich had no formal opus number system for his compositions. Many of Blazhevich's compositions either have vague date ranges, or no date at all.

During his lifetime, his more popular music was published by Muzgiz (State Music Publishing House). Muzgiz used a system of plate numbers following the format M. ##### Г. from 1918–1964. For Blazhevich's more popular works, published with a plate number between 1918–1964, the number can be used to approximate the period which the composition is from, though note some plate numbers are far greater due to second and third republications decades after the initial one. Some dates can be found on Blazhevich's original manuscripts, or in his books Methods (1941) and Autobiography (1939). Some of his works' dates can be approximated due to their mention in his writings.

For Blazhevich's more obscure works, such as Concerti No. 11, 12 and 13, they exist only in handwritten manuscript form, meaning their date of creation will never be known accurately. Further complicating matters, much of Blazhevich's content has been published illegally, for example Editions BIM's 1996 publication of Concerto No. 1, further confusing which works were written when. Nevertheless, most of Blazhevich's works can be dated within ~10 years, and his pedagogical publications as well as their edits and republications are all dated meticulously.

== Instrumental Music ==
=== Concertos for trombone ===
- Concerto No. 1 in E♭ Major (1923) M. 14081 Г.
- Concerto No. 2 in Db Major (1924)
- Concerto No. 3 in E♭ Major (1924)
- Concerto No. 4 in B♭ Major (1924)
- Concerto No. 5 in E♭ Major (1924)
- Concerto No. 6 in B♭ Major (1924)
- Concerto No. 7 in E♭ Major (1924)
- Concerto No. 8 in A♭ Major (1925) M. 20742 Г.
- Concerto No. 9 in E Minor (1925)
- Concerto No. 10 in F minor (1924) M. 12070 Г.
- Concerto No. 11 (1926)
- Concerto No. 12 (1926)
- Concerto No. 13 in A♭ Major (1927)

=== Other works for trombone and piano ===
- Concert Sketch No. 1 (1930)
- Concert Sketch No. 2 (1930)
- Concert Sketch No. 3 (1931)
- Concert Sketch No. 4 (1932)
- Concert Sketch No. 5 (1927–1937)
- Concert Sketch No. 6 (1938–1942)
- Concert Sketch No. 7 (1938–1942)
- Concert Sketch No. 8 (1938–1942)
- Concert Sketch No. 9 (1939–1942)
- Concert Sketch No. 10 (1939–1942)
- Miniature No. 1 (1927–1938)
- Miniature No. 2 (1927–1938)
- Miniature No. 3 (1927–1938)
- Miniature No. 4 (1927–1938)
- Miniature No. 5 (1927–1938)
- Miniature No. 6 (1927–1938)
- Miniature No. 7 (1927–1938)
- Miniature No. 8 (1927–1938)
- Miniature No. 9 (1927–1938)
- Miniature No. 10 (1927–1938)
- Miniature No. 11 (1939–1942)
- Miniature No. 12 (1939–1942)
- Miniature No. 13 (1939–1942)
- Miniature No. 14 (1939–1942)
- Miniature No. 15 (1939–1942)
- Miniature No. 16 (1939–1942)
- Miniature No. 17 (1939–1942)
- Miniature No. 18 (1939–1942)
- Miniature No. 19 (1939–1942)
- Scherzo (1939–1942)
- Five Fragments (1935–1938)
- Mosaic (1938–1942)
- Sketches (1939–1942)
- Concert Etude (Krotov, co-author) (1922–1928)
- Elegy (1939–1942)
- Five Etudes (1933–1938)
- 10 Concert Etudes (1938–1942)
- 30 Etudes (1935)

=== Etudes and studies for trombone ===
- Advanced Daily Trills (1921)
- Etudes Vol. I from "School for Trombone in Clefs (1933)" (1930–1933)
- Etudes Vol. II from "School for Trombone in Clefs (1933)" (1930–1933)
- 50 Etudes for Alto Trombone (1930–1938)
- 25 Etudes for Tenor Trombone (1930–1938)
- 50 Etudes for Bass Trombone (1930–1938)
- Sequences – 26 Melodic Exercises in Different Rhythms and Keys for Trombone (1920–1922)
- 24 Etudes "Virtuoso"

=== Trombone ensembles ===
- 38 Concert Duets for Two Trombones Vol. I (1920–1925)
- 38 Concert Duets for Two Trombones Vol. II (1920–1925)
- Eight Duets (1939–1942)
- Trio for Three Trombones (1939–1942)
- Suite No. 1 for Three Trombones (1920–1928)
- Suite No. 2 for Three Trombones (1920–1928)
- Suite No. 3 for Three Trombones (1939–1942)
- 48 Terzetti for Three Trombones (1939–1942)
- Etude for Ten Trombones and Two Pianos (1930–1942)
- Trombone Quartet No. 1 (1920–1942)
- Trombone Quartet No. 2 (1920–1942)
- Trombone Quartet No. 3 (1920–1942)
- Trombone Quartet No. 4 (1920–1942)
- Trombone Quartet No. 5 (1920–1942)
- Trombone Quartet No. 6 (1920–1942)
- Trombone Quartet No. 7 (1920–1942)
- Trombone Quartet No. 8 (1920–1942)
- Trombone Quartet No. 9 (1920–1942)
- Trombone Quartet No. 10 (1920–1942)
- Trombone Quartet No. 11 (1920–1942)
- Trombone Quartet No. 12 (1920–1942)
- Trombone Quartet No. 13 (1920–1942)
- Trombone Quartet No. 14 (1920–1942)
- Trombone Quartet No. 15 (1920–1942)
- Trombone Quartet No. 16 (1920–1942)
- Trombone Quartet No. 17 (1920–1942)
- Trombone Quartet No. 18 (1920–1942)
- Trombone Quartet No. 19 (1920–1942)
- Waltz de Concert for Four Trombones (1921–1942)

=== Mixed trombone ensembles ===
- Pastoral for Four Trombones and Tuba (1910–1920)
- Quintet for Four Trombones and Tuba (1910–1920)
- Fantasy No. 1 for 10 Trombones 2 Tubas and Timpani; also known as Musical Impromptu for 10 Trombones and 2 Tubas (or 12 Trombones) and Timpani (1920–1928)
- Fantasy No. 2 for 12 Trombones (or 10 Trombones and 2 Tubas) and Timpani (1920–1928)
- Suite No. 1 for Brass Players (1938–1942)
- Suite No. 2 for Brass Players (1938–1942)

=== Trombone methods ===
- School for Slide Trombone in Clefs, Part II (1915–1920) ("in Clefs, Part II" added in 1936 when Part I was published)
- School for Slide Trombone, Part I (1935) ("Part I" added in 1937)
- School of Legato Development on Trombone in Two Volumes (1920–1922)

=== Solos for other instruments ===
- Scherzo for Trumpet and Piano (1939–1942)
- Nocturne for Oboe and Piano (1939–1942)
- Arabesques for Piano (1928–1937)
- Concerto for Trumpet (1938–1942)
- Concerto for Tuba (1938–1942)

=== Etudes for other instruments ===
- 70 Etudes for Contrabass Tuba (arranged by author from School for Trombone in Clefs) (composed 1915–1920, arranged 1935)
- 60 Etudes for Tuba in E♭ (arranged from 70 Etudes for Tuba) (arranged 1935)
- 60 Etudes for Tuba in B (arranged from 70 Etudes for Tuba) (arranged 1935)
- 60 Intermediate Etudes for Tuba (arranged from School for Tuba) (1936)
- Sequences for Tuba
- 70 Etudes for Trumpet
- 30 Etudes for Bassoon
- Five Etudes for Clarinet and Piano
- Sequences for Trumpet (transcription of trombone version)

=== Methods for other instruments ===
- School for Trumpet in B (1938–1942)
- School for Tuba in B (1920–1924)

== Band Music ==
=== Band methods ===
- School of Collective Playing for Band (1928–1934)
- Daily Collective Exercises for Band (1935–1942)

(Both works have individual parts for every instrument in a standard military band)

=== Works for band ===
- "Columnar March" for Band (1928–1931) M. 11734 Г.
- "Concert March" for Band (1928–1931)
- Stalin's Route, March for Band (1939–1942)
- Overture No. 1 (1920–1937)
- Overture No. 2 (1920–1937)
- Waltz No. 1 (1920–1938)
- Waltz No. 2 (1920–1938)
- Suite No. 1 (1920–1938)
- March No. 1 (1920–1938)
- March No. 2 (1920–1938)
- March No. 3 (1920–1938)
- March No. 4 (1920–1938)
- March No. 5 (1920–1938)
- March No. 6 (1920–1938)
- March No. 7 (1920–1938)
- March No. 8 (1920–1938)
- March No. 9 (1920–1938)
- March No. 10 (1920–1938)
- Concerto for Band (1937–1942)

=== Arrangements for band ===
- Ludwig van Beethoven March No. 1 (Op. 45) (1920–1926)
- Ludwig van Beethoven March No. 2 (Op. 45) (1920–1926)
- Ludwig van Beethoven March No. 3 (Op. 45) (1920–1926)
