= Friedrich August Belcke =

German trombonist

Friedrich August Belcke (27 May 1795 Lucka, Saxe-Gotha-Altenburg – 10 December 1874) was a celebrated trombonist in Berlin in the 19th century.

In 1815, after two solos with the Leipzig Gewandhaus Orchestra, Belcke had a 30-year career as a trombone soloist.

In 1819 a critic admired a concert given by Belcke in Leipzig for its "clarity and precision, distinctness and pleasing sound, plus something truly noble in the imposing trombonistic figurations, as well as astonishing skill in that which is not idiomatic to the instrument - for example, rapid passages, cantabile, trills, etc." [1]

The other well-known trombonist of his time was Carl Traugott Queisser.
