= Trombone Concertino (David) =

1837 Concerto by Ferdinand David

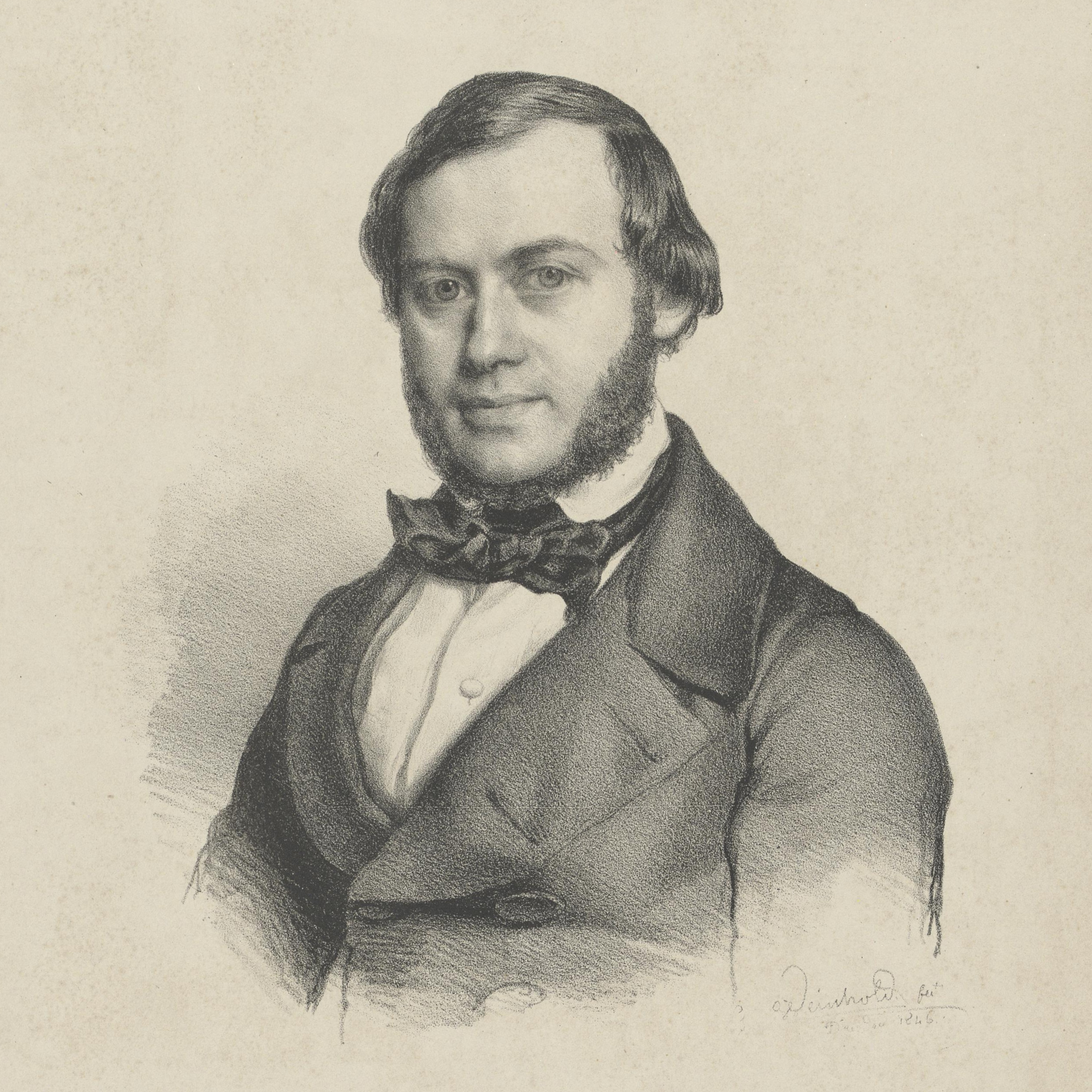
Ferdinand David

Ferdinand David's Concertino for Trombone and Orchestra, Op. 4, was composed in 1837. It was dedicated to Karl Traugott Queisser, who was a good friend of David, and also played in the Gewandhaus Orchestra, where David was concertmeister. The piece was premiered at the Gewandhaus with Queisser playing the solo part and Mendelssohn conducting. It was an immediate success.

This score is written for the following instruments: solo trombone, 2 flutes, 2 oboes, 2 clarinets 2 bassoons, 4 horns, 2 trumpets in E♭, 3 trombones, timpani, and strings

It consists of three movements:

1. Allegro maestoso
2. Marcia funebre (Andante)
3. Allegro maestoso

The second movement was arranged for violin and piano by David and was played at his own funeral.

A performance of the concerto usually lasts around 16–17 minutes.

The piece has been recorded by Brett Baker, Michel Becquet, Michael Bertoncello, Cristian Ganicenco, Jürgen Heinel, Massimo La Rosa, Carl Lenthe, Christian Lindberg, Jacques Mauger, Armin Rosin, and Branimir Slokar, among others.
