= Lucka =

- Town
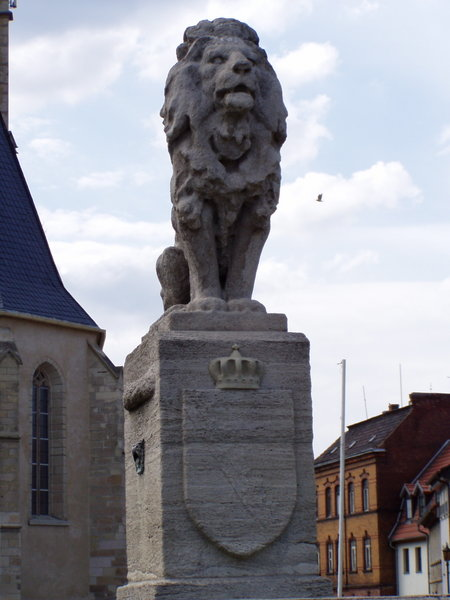
- Wettinerbrunnen, erected in memory of the 1307 battle of Lucka

- Coat of arms

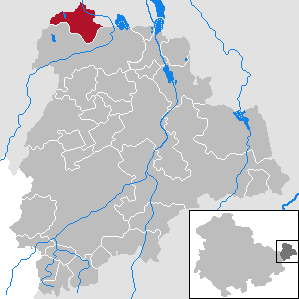
- Location of Lucka within Altenburger Land district
- Interactive map of Lucka
- Location within Germany Location within Thuringia
- Coordinates: 51°5′42″N 12°20′7″E
- Country: Germany
- State: Thuringia
- District: Altenburger Land
- Subdivisions: 3

Government
  - Mayor (2019–25): Kathrin Backmann-Eichhorn

Area
  - Total: 12.93 km^{2} (4.99 sq mi)
- Elevation: 150 m (490 ft)

Population (2025-12-31)
  - Total: 3,457
  - Density: 267.4/km^{2} (692.5/sq mi)
- Time zone: UTC+01:00 (CET)
  - Summer (DST): UTC+02:00 (CEST)
- Postal codes: 04613
- Dialling codes: 034492
- Vehicle registration: ABG
- Website: www.lucka.de

Lucka (German pronunciation: [ˈlʊka]) is a town in the Thuringian landkreis of Altenburger Land.

== History ==
The settlement of the area around Lucka occurred in the early Stone Age (5000-2500 b.c.). Lucka was first mentioned in writing in 1320 as "opidum Luckowe". The area was also the site of a battle in 1307 between the Habsburgs and the Wettins. Within the German Empire (1871–1918), Lucka was part of the Duchy of Saxe-Altenburg. From 1952 to 1990, it was part of the Bezirk Leipzig of East Germany.

== International relations ==
Lucka is twinned with:

- Unterschleißheim, Bavaria
- Weselberg, Rhineland-Palatinate

== Town Division ==
Lucka is divided into three parts: the town itself, Breitenhain and Prößdorf.

== Personalities ==
- Friedrich August Belcke – trombonist
- Otto Engert — a Communist politician (b. in Prößdorf)
- Erika Zuchold - World Champion and Olympic Medalist in Gymnastics

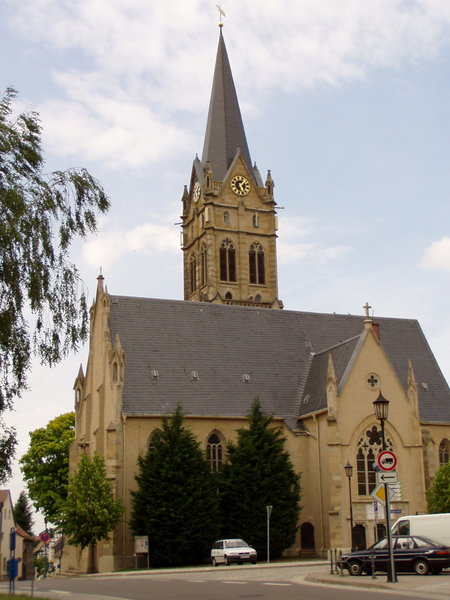
Lucka's Church
