= Vladislav Blazhevich =

Russian musician, composer and pedagogue(1881–1942)

- Владислав Блажевич
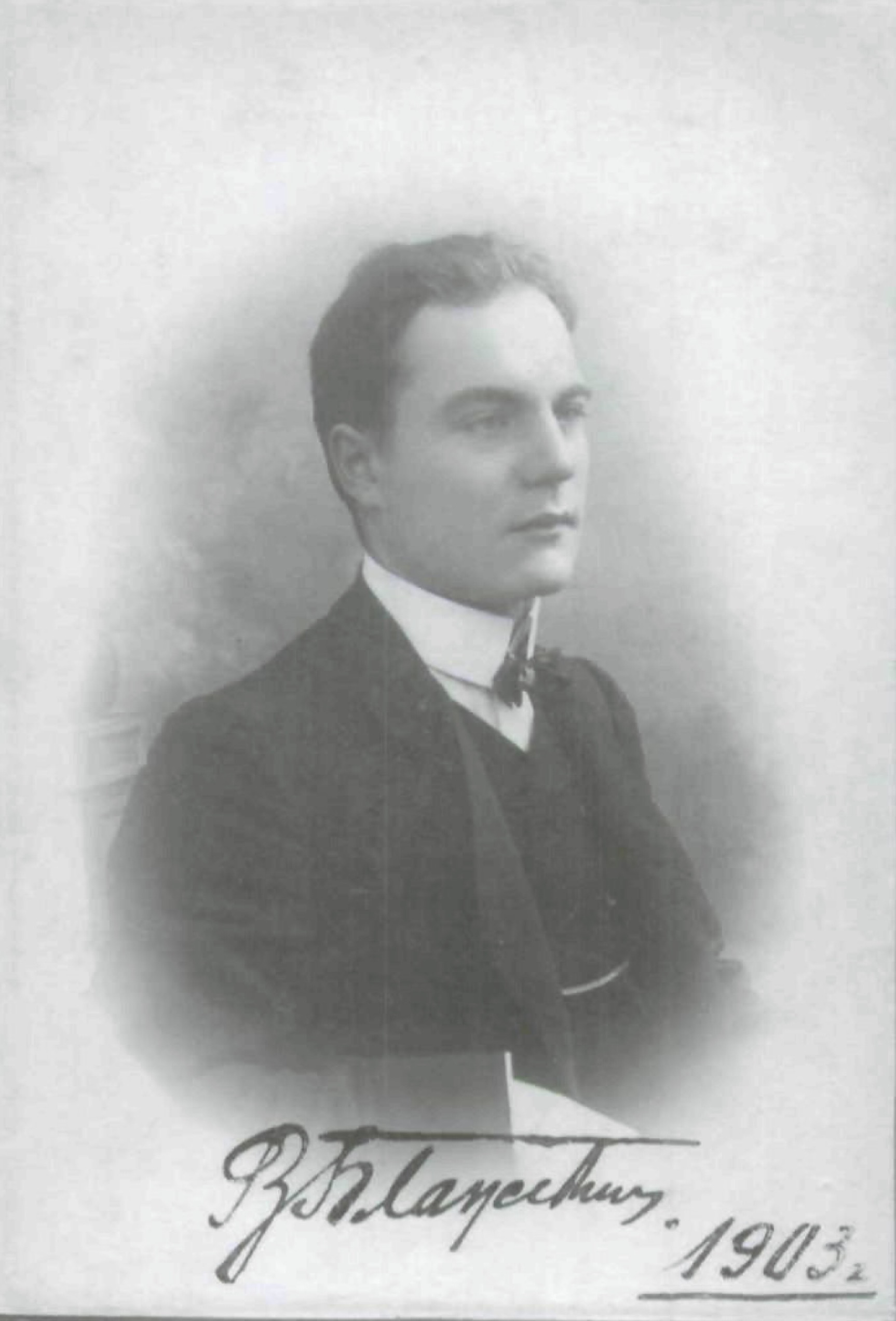
- Blazhevich in 1903 (age 22)
- Born: 3 August 1881; Tregubovka, Russian Empire
- Died: 11 April 1942 (aged 60); Moscow, Soviet Union
- Education: Moscow Conservatory
- Occupations: Composer; Trombonist; Pedagogue

Signature
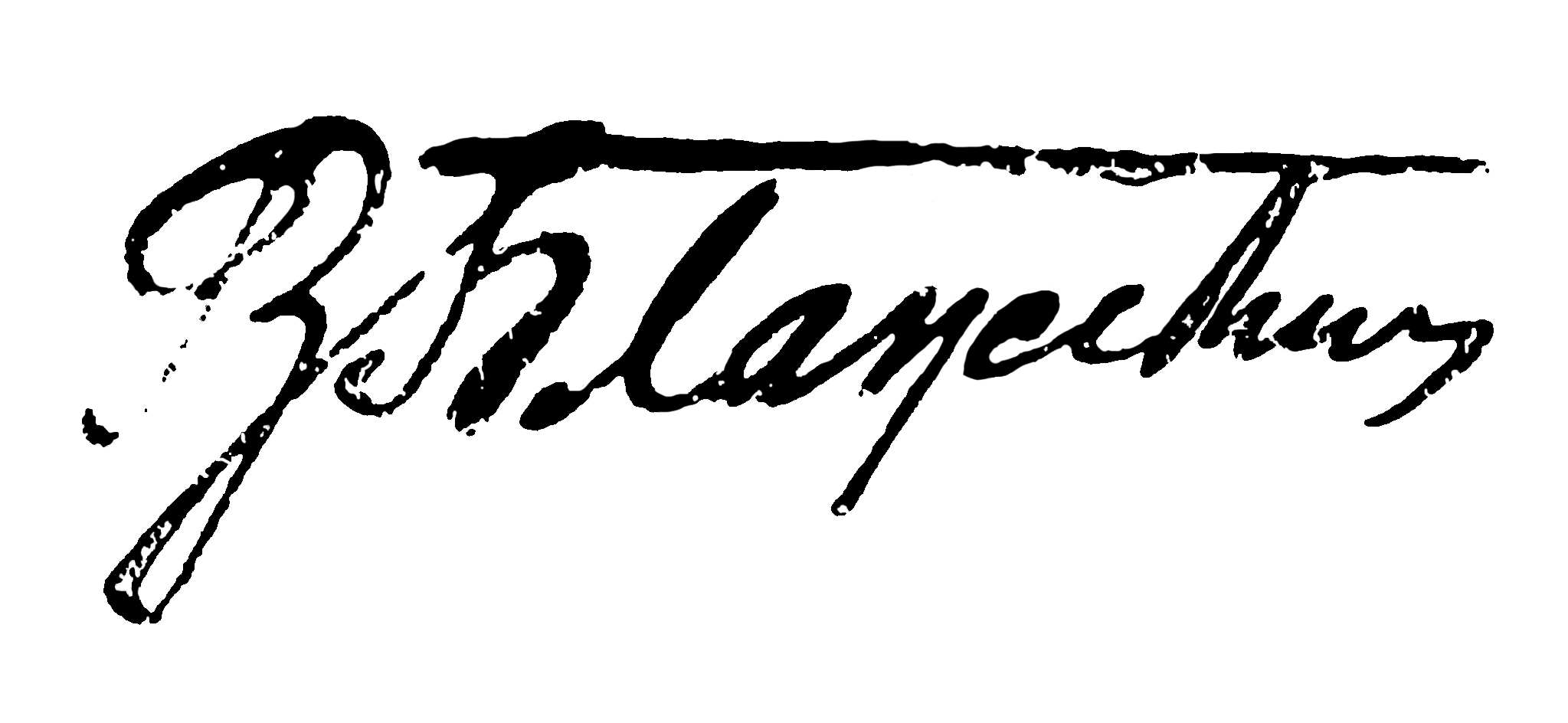

Vladislav Mikhailovitch Blazhevich (Note: Born Владислав Михайлович Блажевич, the most correct English form of his Polish name would be Wladyslaw Michailowicz Blazewicz. The Polish spelling of his name would be Władysław Michaiłowicz Błazėwicz. The form 'Vladislav Blazhevich' is a Romanization that first appeared in 1940s publications by Leeds Music Co., and was thereafter commonplace in the West. There are numerous other spellings of his name, though Vladislav Blazhevich is by far the most common.), (3 August 1881 – 10 April 1942) was a Soviet-era Russian composer, conductor, trombonist, and pedagogue. A highly skilled trombonist, euphonist and tubist, Blazhevich played in various orchestras and bands and was a professor of trombone at Moscow Conservatory. He is widely known for his multiple method books for trombone and tuba, as well as his concerti and solo works for brass, and is the most prolific trombone composer in history.

After a challenging and harsh childhood, Blazhevich's musical career began in 1899, when he became a trombonist with Astrakhan Grenadier Regiment. The Following year he would begin studies at Moscow Conservatory under Christopher Bork. This institution would come to be one of the most significant in his life. In 1928 Blazhevich ceased his performing career to pursue pedagogy and composition at Moscow University, and here he composed the majority of his pedagogical material and performance works.

Blazhevich completed his first method book, School for Trombone in Clefs, in 1916, and his second, School for Trombone in 1935, as well as a School of Legato Development in 1924. These books (the first of their kind) and their practical approach to brass technique, came to be the signature content of Blazhevich's career and revolutionised brass pedagogy. After several editions were published in the West, Blazhevich's pedagogical approach was also spread across Europe and the United States. Blazhevich also composed dozens of performance works for trombone, trumpet and wind band, though these are both less published and less popular.

== Biography ==
=== Early life ===
Blazhevich was born in 1881 at Tregubovka Farm, in the Smolensky Uyezd of the Smolensk Governorate of the Russian Empire. His father Mikhail was of noble Polish descent, and his mother a local commoner. In 1881, Blazhevich's father was arrested and sentenced to serve 20 years of labour for anti tsarist sentiment: he supported Polish nobility against the Russian imperial occupation of Poland. Due to the difficulty of running a household without her husband, Blazhevich's mother died in 1887, making him orphan by the age of six. Such early trauma had a deep effect on Blazhevich, with colleagues noting it left him "quite introverted," yet also created a "strong will and self-sufficient individualism that insured (sic) his professional success."

Blazhevich's father's side was court ordered to adopt him, and his uncle became his guardian. Life on his uncle's farm was incredibly challenging, likened to "abject poverty" at times, with Blazhevich not owning his own pair of shoes until age 12, when his uncle enlisted him in the army.

=== Early career ===
At 12, Blazhevich was enlisted into the Third Artillery Brigade in Smolensk, where he was given his own clothing and equipment for the first time, as well as a euphonium. His musical interests did not start here though, as Blazhevich had played the ocarina while living on his uncle's farm. Blazhevich played euphonium in the Artillery Brigade, but asked to switch to trombone to open up his musical opportunities as a soloist and potential orchestra member. Blazhevich joined the Astrakhan Grenadier Regiment in 1899, and left in 1900, when he began his formal study of music.

=== Education ===
Hoping to elevate his career, Blazhevich entered the trombone class of Christopher Bork in 1900, at Moscow Conservatory. Blazhevich recalls Bork as a "dry and pedantic teacher, who liked discipline and demanded unquestioning fulfilment of his instructions". Blazhevich studied brass, music theory, orchestration and piano while at the Conservatory. The demanding, comprehensive style of learning would go on to heavily influence Blazhevich's own pedagogy. Blazhevich had a notably deep desire to learn, imploring the dean to let him attend the classes of other instruments besides trombone, so he might broaden his knowledge of teaching and performing. Blazhevich graduated Moscow Conservatory with a trombone diploma in 1905

=== Performance career ===
At the conclusion of his studies at Moscow Conservatory, Blazhevich auditioned for a trombone position with the Bolshoi Theatre, starting in the 1906 season. Blazhevich won the position, and would be a member of the orchestra until his retirement in 1928. Colleagues in the orchestra commented that Blazhevich was not just an outstanding performer, but also "strong-willed" and "kind-hearted", lending him to being an excellent section leader.

=== World War I ===
Blazhevich's career was interrupted by the outbreak of World War I, in which he was drafted as the assistant superintendent of a military hospital. Despite the heavy workload of the hospital, Blazhevich's previous military career likely equipped him to deal with the work to a degree, as he both performed with the Bolshoi orchestra through this period, and found time to compose at night. Blazhevich organised a benefit concert made up of his own new compositions in 1916, devoted to men lost in the war.

=== Tenure at Moscow Conservatory ===
Blazhevich retired from the Bolshoi Orchestra in 1928, now Principal Trombone. His final performance with the Bolshoi Orchestra was Borodin's Prince Igor. At only 47 years old, his retirement was considered early and unnecessary, especially for an individual with such technical facility. Blazhevich had become trombone professor at Moscow Conservatory in 1922, while still working at Bolshoi Theatre, however his interests in pedagogy and composition between 1920 and 1928 (while still a member of Bolshoi) had increased to a point where he wished to fully dedicate himself to education. It was during this tenure that Blazhevich arguably reached his artistic pinnacle, developing his distinct personal style and writing the majority of solo compositions and technical books.

=== Raichman Exchange ===
Blazhevich studied with Russian American Trombonist Jacob Raichman (BSO Principal Trombone 1927–1955) in the early 1940s at Moscow Conservatory. When Raichman left for America after their exchange, he was presented with a signed copy of School for Trombone in Clefs by Blazhevich, as well as copies of 26 Sequences, Concert Duets (1926) and School of Legato Development. Blazhevich likely presented him with these mostly technical works rather than his Concert Pieces and concerti due to their difficulty. Raichman used School for Trombone in Clefs with his students in Boston, and after their success, wrote to Blazhevich requesting other pedagogical materials as well as Concerto No. 2 and No. 5. Blazhevich complied. Raichman promised not to share Blazhevich's materials with anyone but his students, yet this promise proved short lived, as Leeds Music published versions of 26 Sequences and School for Legato Development edited by Raichman shortly after. They also published a version of School for Trombone in Clefs in 1948, after Blazhevich's death. These two instances of disregard for Blazhevich's artistic license set the tone for the illegal and unethical publication of much of his work into the future. Boston University Circulation Library possessed the Raichman Blazhevich collection after his death, though much of the historic score and music material was lost in a plumbing flood.

=== Death and legacy ===
Blazhevich died on 10 April 1942. His content continues to be performed and studied globally, and new versions of his works are published often. There is a Moscow City Children's Music School named after him. On 17 January 2011, a concert commemorating the 130th Anniversary of Blazhevich's birth was held at Moscow Conservatory.

== Music ==
=== Overview ===
Blazhevich's works vary widely, from the solo to orchestral level, though almost entirely feature brass instruments. Blazhevich's solo works are associated with the formation of a distinctly "[Russian] performing school," and have had an impact on "all levels of trombone training". While Blazhevich wrote primarily for solo trombone, he also has works for wind ensemble, trumpet and tuba, including Concert Marches, scherzo for trumpet and piano, and various arrangements of his concerti for tuba, bassoon and trumpet.

=== Concerti ===
Blazhevich composed most of his trombone concerti in the 1920s, during his time at Bolshoi theatre and the beginning of his tenure at Moscow Conservatory, though 11, 12 and 13 were written later, likely in the 1930s. The concerti are largely freeform (Note: Concerto No. 11 is the exception, as it is composed in sonata form, with the third movement a recapitulation of the first.), running continuously and not holding the traditional pauses between each movement, with piano or orchestral interludes between each of the three movements to signify the transition instead. Blazhevich wrote in his book Methods (1948) the following on the structure of his concerti: "The first movement includes an opening, then a theme of melodic character with development, followed by a recitative theme that goes into recapitulation of the first theme, then ends with a virtuoso cadence. The second movement is always a lyrical Andante in a three part song form (ABA), intended for the development of musicianship and tone quality. The third movement is usually in the Rondo or Scherzo form. The main theme from the first movement is sometimes used to end the concerto." Blazhevich wrote that the purpose of his concerti was to show off the technical and musical capabilities of the trombone, and to enrich the meagre solo performance repertoire available to his students. Ivanovich notes of Blazhevich's atypical concerto structure that "of great importance is the fact that the concertos multifacetedly reveal the richest expressive potential of the trombone, its large range, the variety of register colours, the ability to embody both cantiled melodies and virtuoso passages, including using a diverse dynamic palette."

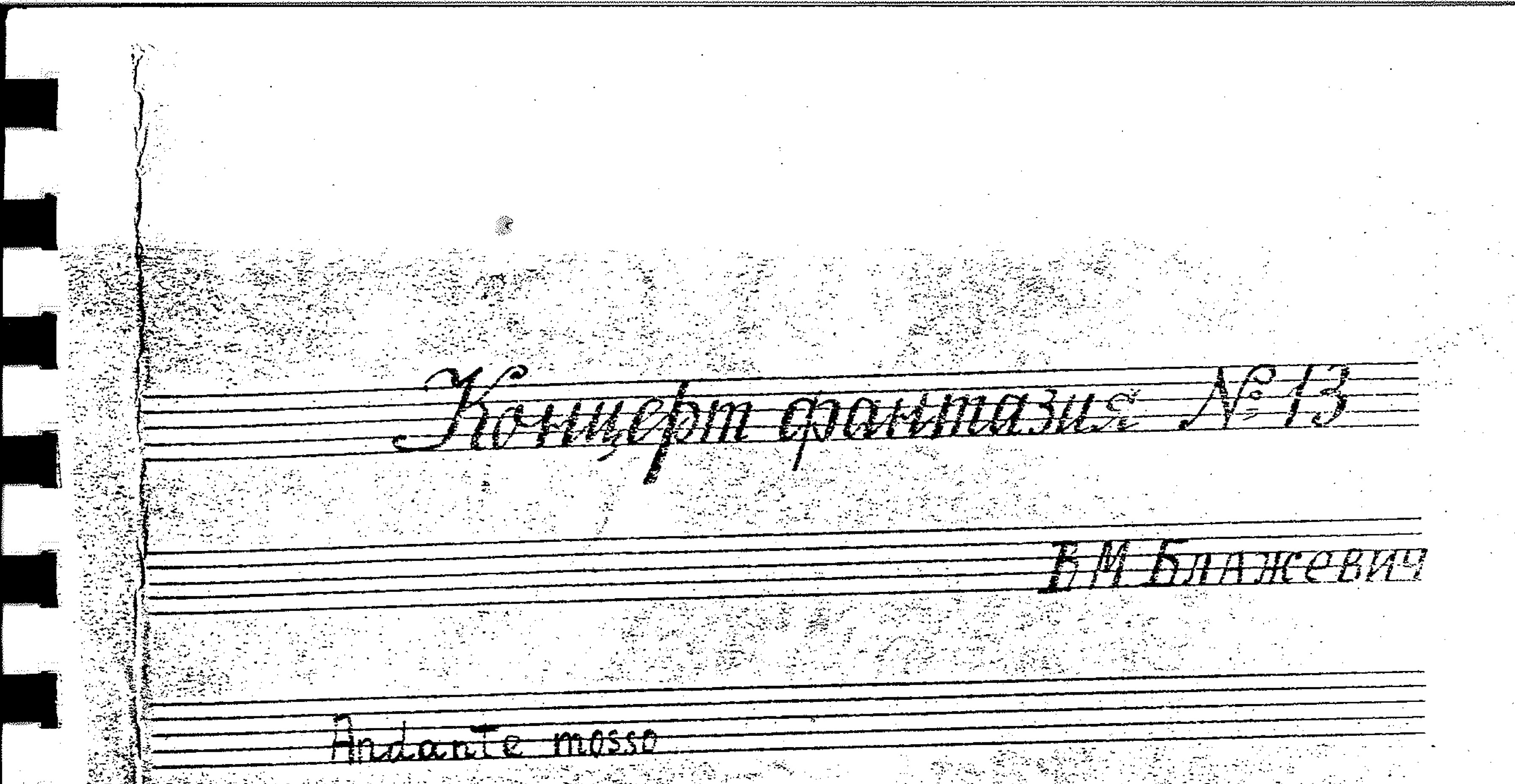
First page of a handwritten manuscript of Blazhevich's Concerto No. 13, this version bearing the title Concert Fantasy (Концерт фантазия) rather than Concerto (Концерт).

It has been suggested that Blazhevich's concerti are more akin to Fantasias, due to their freeform style and lack of recapitulation. Certain manuscripts of Blazhevich's concerti are even titled "Concert Fantasy" rather than Concerto. Sparrow states, "The title Fantasia might actually be more appropriate for all of the solo works by Blazhevich because he really does not use a concerto form and, to the best of my knowledge, none of the concertos had orchestra parts written for them." Sparrow's assertion, while popular, is incorrect, given that Ivanovich confirms that "sketches of the instrumentation for the concertos remain in the composer's music archive... not fully implemented by the author, with the exception of Concerto No. 2" (which has a full orchestral arrangement), that there are extant recordings of Concerto No. 2 with an orchestra and that multiple Russian publishers refer to the concerti as for trombone and orchestra (тромбон и оркестр) not trombone and piano (тромбон и фортепиано). Further, musicologist Donald Francis Tovey states that "the term "fantasia" would adequately cover all post-classical forms of concerto," suggesting that Blazhevich's classification of his works as "concerti" is justified as there is no functional difference between the two given Blazhevich's post-classical context. Blazhevich himself clearly distinguished his concerti from the idea of fantasy, given he composed two Fantasies for 12 trombones distinct from the concerti.

=== Other Trombone Works ===
Blazhevich wrote a number of solo trombone works beyond his concerti, including 5 or 10 Concert Pieces (Note: Sources vary on whether Blazhevich composed 5 or 10 Concert Pieces. Friedman reports it was 10, Kharlamov reports 5. The only regularly performed Concert Piece is No. 5, which is popular across trombone pedagogy, and is used as a test piece for American All State music camps.) for trombone and piano. Concert Piece No. 5 remains popular across Europe and America, and is a common audition piece. He also wrote 20 Miniatures for Trombone and Piano, 12 Melodic Etudes and 24 Etudes "Virtuoso".

=== Ensemble Works ===
Blazhevich also composed a number of works for various trombone ensembles, for the development of ensemble capabilities and orchestra career preparation. The works fulfilling this purpose include 38 Concert Duets, 24 Trios and 5 Suites for three trombones, 2 Suites for Trombone Quartet, and two fantasies for 12 trombones or 10 trombones and 2 tubas.

Blazhevich composed works for wind ensembles, including a Concert March "Stalin's Route," for wind ensemble and Column March for brass band. He also arranged Ludwig van Beethoven's 3 Marches (Op. 45) for wind ensemble. In 1937 Blazhevich published School of Collective Playing on Wind Instruments, a pedagogical and training guide to the wind band for "initial lessons with wind orchestras in workers' clubs, units of the Red Army and military bandmaster classes of technical schools and conservatories".

=== Proliferation and Publication Issues ===
After his death, Blazhevich's works have sold tens of thousands of copies across the world, though almost entirely without permission from Blazhevich or his family. Even during Blazhevich's late life, publications emerged in the United States without his permission. Through private correspondence and distribution by the collaboration of Universal Edition with Muzgiz, American companies such as Leeds Music Co., Music Corporation of America (MCA) and BELWIN were able to publish Blazhevich's content in the 1930s and 1940s, though crucially, they falsely claimed they had permission to do so.

BELWIN published Concert Piece No. 5 in 1939 without permission, an open infringement of Blazhevich's intellectual property. After the Raichman exchange, Blazhevich's works would not see further publication beyond Russia for more than 20 years. however, in 1974, Professor William Cramer of Florida State University began a correspondence with Professor Victor Venglovsky of Leningrad State Conservatory (which had screened and approved many of Blazhevich's works in association with Moscow Conservatory. This correspondence would see the remaining 11 Trombone Concerti (No. 2 and No. 5 had been acquired by Jacob Raichman) enter the United States for the first time. These Blazhevich solo works served as a significant part of the William Cramer collection at Florida State University library, who have now unfortunately lost this part of the collection. Fortunately, these manuscripts were copied by Ronald Barron of the Boston Symphony Orchestra. The rarer 11th, 12th and 13th concerti may have been lost to the world without this effort, as they have never been published, and are unlikely to exist in Russia.

Reginald Fink's Accura Music, one of America's largest musical publishers, based their entire low brass etude catalogue, including Advanced Musical Etudes for Trombone and Euphonium (1991), Advanced Rhythm and Technique Etudes (1991) and Symphonic Duets in Bass Clef for Trombone or Euphonium (1992) on Blazhevich's technical books.

Another example of infringement was Benny Sluchin's edit of Concerto No. 1, published in 1996 by Editions BIM. It is the only published version of Concerto No. 1, and is based on Blazhevich's original handwritten manuscript (a copy of which Sluchin obtained in 1981 on tour in Russia). This version was published with no approval from the Blazhevich family, and is in parts incorrect.

International Music Company is the most prolific American publisher of Blazhevich, with versions of several of his major concerti published, though these are legally dubious.

Alphonse Leduc, Paris, have published nearly every Blazhevich concerto and most of his technique books, with substantial edits. Leduc have repaid some royalties to the Blazhevich family though, and agreed on legal licensing, unlike many other companies.

Trombonist Andrey G. Kharlamov made substantial efforts to right the various instances of illegality, working to both remove illegal content from publication and publish legal versions. Kharlamov travelled to Russia and contacted Blazhevich's living family, informing them of the various publications that had sold tens of thousands of copies with no money going to the Blazhevich family. With approval, Kharlamov then published new ethical versions of several Blazhevich works under his publishing company East-West International.

Until East West International's republications from 2007 onwards, the Blazhevich family reported "no payments" or royalties for any Western publications of Blazhevich's technical books. Kharlamov and Michael Deryugin's collaborative publications of School for Trombone in Clefs (2007 and 2012), Low Range Studies for Trombone (with Charles Vernon, 2011) and Sequences for Trombone (with Michael Mulcahy, 2008), all with the full original forewords by Blazhevich, errors from other versions corrected, and permission from and royalties to Blazhevich's family, are significant in their milestone treatment of Blazhevich's intellectual rights.

== Pedagogy ==
=== Overview ===
Blazhevich was a foundational trombone pedagogue, writing numerous guides on all aspects of trombone playing aiming to produce a trombonist capable of solo and ensemble playing at a high level. His pedagogical material is of excellent quality, and is still used today in numerous forms as an educational and auditioning tool. His name is often included with other influential brass pedagogues such as Arban, Bordogni, Mueller, Schlossberg, Kopprasch and others.

Blazhevich's pedagogical style emerged from the foundational trombone pedagogy of the 19th century, in which trombone schools in Paris and Leipzig developed the first principles of trombone pedagogy, exemplified by concerti of David, Sachse and Belcke, all written for trombonist Karl Traugott Queisser. Kharlamov notes in the analyses of Blazhevich's Program for Trombone at the Moscow Conservatory that "Blazhevich does mention the Concertino by Ferdinand David as the most successful work written for trombone thus far," and it seems much of Blazhevich's pedagogy is angled towards enabling performance of this and other concerti.

Blazhevich's pedagogy was also influenced by his tutelage under Christopher Bork, who was a "dry and pedantic teacher, who liked discipline and demanded unquestioning fulfilment of his instructions", and this influence entered the pedagogy of Blazhevich, which features repetition and stringent standards.

=== Works ===
Blazhevich wrote 5 central pedagogical books, and a handful of smaller ones.

First published in 1925 by Muzgiz, School for Trombone in Clefs is Blazhevich's most famous and central book. This method is a development method for advanced students familiar with how to play the trombone (Note: As opposed to Blazhevich's comprehensive beginner's method, School for Trombone (1935). The foreword of School for Trombone in Clefs specifically states that "The school is written exclusively for students of the Conservatory and is no way for beginners."). The foreword lists its goals as "1) To give a thorough formulation of the control of the instrument 2) To teach scales and arpeggios 3) To develop relative musicality and technique on the instrument in accordance with the requirements of our time". The foreword also suggests that the student simultaneously "works with Vol. I of School for Legato Development".

First published in 1924 by Muzgiz, School for Legato Development is a legato development with similar goals to those by Fink and Arban. It is designed to be simultaneously studied with School for Trombone in Clefs . The school is divided into 30 exercises, of increasing difficulty and higher tessitura, as well as a page of alternative positions exercises at the end. The exercises are immediately in a combination of all three trombone clefs (bass, alto, tenor) from the first exercise onward, suggesting the method was to be used after a student had learnt the basics of positions and reading. The exercises presented centre around repetition with alterations of key, tessitura or rhythm, to build legato capabilities across all parts of the instrument.

First published by Musgiz in 1925 as "Sequences – 26 Melodic Exercises (In Different Rhythms and Keys) – for Trombone," Sequences is a book of etudes primarily designed to attain rhythmic and metrical fluency in a melodic context. Blazhevich's foreword to Sequences reads: "These exercises in sequences should make up for the lack of musical literature – the lack of exercises for the trombone in the relationships of keys, rhythms and keys. 26 exercises give the student the opportunity to acquire skill in performing material of a melodic nature, set out in the three main keys for the instrument, and in addition become familiar with the wide use of rhythm and tempo notations. These sequences are recommended after school for the sliding trombone, by the same author". The unusual metre of many of these, such as 3/8 + 2/8 for No. 2 and 6/16 for No. 4, as well as intense use of ornamentation, constant clef changes and broad range of tempi, suggest sequences would only be useful to an already experienced student. Within Blazhevich's pedagogical style, Sequences lies between his foundational School for Trombone and School for Trombone in Clefs and more virtuosic concertos and concert sketches.

First published in 1935 by Musgiz, School for Slide Trombone is a beginners method, and is distinct to School for Trombone in Clefs.

First published by Musgiz in 1937, School for Contrabass Tuba (in BBb) is Blazhevich's complete tuba method. It is often confused with an earlier work, 70 Etudes for Tuba, which was a 1935 publication consisting of a selection of his etudes from School for Trombone in Clefs, transposed down an octave.

Blazhevich published other technical books, including Etudes for Trombone Vol. 1 & 2, 24 Etudes "Virtuoso" and 10 Concert Etudes with Piano, though these are not published in the West, if at all.
