= T-Bone Concerto =

1996 concerto by Johan de Meij

T-bone Concerto is a concerto for solo trombone and wind band by Dutch composer Johan de Meij which was completed in January 1996. The work was commissioned by the Kentucky Music Educators Association (KMEA) for performance at the 1996 KMEA annual conference. The first movement was premiered in February 1996 at the conference in Louisville, Kentucky, performed by the soloist Jeffrey Thomas.

A performance of the entire work with Jacques Mauger on solo trombone and the Band of the Royal Dutch Marines world premiered at Concertgebouw Amsterdam on March 1, 1996.

== Instrumentation ==
The work is scored for solo trombone and symphonic band consisting of the following forces:

Woodwind
1 piccolo (doubling 3rd Flute in the second movement)
2 flutes
2 oboes
1 cor anglais
1 E♭ clarinet
3 B♭ clarinets (several on a part)
1 alto clarinet
1 bass clarinet
2 alto saxophones
1 tenor saxophone
1 baritone saxophone
2 bassoons

Brass
4 horns
2 cornets
3 trumpets
3 trombones
1 euphonium
1 tuba

Strings
1 harp*
1 double bass

Keyboard
piano (doubling harpsichord in the third movement)*

Percussion
timpani
bass drum
snare drum
cymbals (crash and suspended)
triangle
wood block
tom-tom drum
xylophone
glockenspiel
vibraphone
tubular bells
marimba

* The piano and the harp play the same part.

== Movements ==
The concerto consists of three movements (named after ways of preparing a t-bone steak):

1. Rare
2. Medium
3. Well Done

== Recordings ==
- Joseph Alessi, trombone; University of New Mexico Wind Symphony; Eric Rombach-Kendall, conductor
  - Illuminations (Summit Records DCD 367)
- Brett Baker, trombone; Kew Band Melbourne; Mark Ford, conductor
  - T-Bone Concerto (White River WR12-02)
- Brett Baker, trombone; Maidstone Wind Symphony; Jonathan Crowhurst, conductor
  - Slide Projections (White River WR12-06)
- Jesper Juul Sørensen, trombone; The Danish Concert Band; Jørgen Misser Jensen, conductor
  - The Sword and the Crown (Rondo Grammofon RCD 8371)
  - T-Bone Music (Rondo Grammofon RCD 8377)
- Christian Lindberg, trombone; Symphonic Wind Orchestra St. Michael of Thorn; Heinz Friesen, conductor
  - Johan de Meij: Symphony No. 1 'The Lord Of The Rings'; T-Bone Concerto - (World Wind Music WWM 500.034)
  - The Scandinavian Connection - (Amstel Classics CD 9701)
- Jacques Mauger, trombone; Orchestre des Equipages de la Flotte de Brest; Claude Kesmaecker, conductor
  - Latitudes Trombone (JCMA 07)
- Ivan Meylemans, trombone; Symphonic Wind Orchestra St. Michael of Thorn; Heinz Friesen, conductor
  - WASBE Concerts, 1997 (Tonstudio amos CD 5820)
- Jörgen van Rijen, trombone; Orquestra de Vents Filharmonía; José Rafael Pascual-Vilaplana, conductor
  - Canticles (Amstel Classics)
