= Trombone Concerto (Rimsky-Korsakov) =

Trombone concerto by Rimisky Korsakov

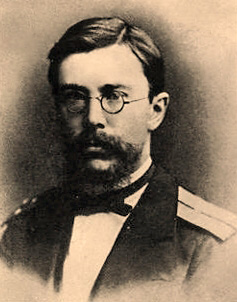
Nikolai Rimsky-Korsakov c. 1870

The Concerto for Trombone and Military Band by Nikolai Rimsky-Korsakov was written in 1877. The concerto consists of three movements: an Allegro Vivace first movement, an Andante Cantabile second movement, and an Allegro-Allegretto third movement in the style of a march. The second and third movements conclude with cadenzas. A full performance of the piece lasts roughly ten minutes.

This concerto was composed for a fellow marine officer Leonov and premiered at a garrison concert at Kronstadt on 16 March 1878. The American premiere took place in June, 1952 at The Mall in Central Park, New York City with Davis Shuman, trombone and the Goldman Band.

In his recording Christian Lindberg famously alters the cadenzas to include technical stunts such as multiphonics. Many performers have taken this recording as a cue to create their own interpretations of the cadenzas.

This concerto has been recorded by many trombone soloists such as Joseph Alessi, Brett Baker, Michel Becquet, Carl Lenthe, Jacques Mauger, Branimir Slokar, Leandro Uviz D'Agostino (ARG), Carsten Svanberg, Alain Trudel, and Douglas Yeo.

Arrangements also exist for UK Brass Band and piano reduction accompaniments. The original score is considered to be out of copyright in the EU and Canada but not the USA.

== Instrumentation ==
- Solo Trombone
- Piccolo
- Flute I–II
- Oboe I–II
- Bassoon I–II
- E♭ Clarinet
- B♭ Soprano Clarinet I–II–III
- Alto Clarinet (Bassett in F)
- Bass Clarinet (Bassett in B♭)
- Cornet in B♭ I–II
- Baritone (Corno basso)
- Trumpet in F I–II, in E♭ I–II
- Horn in F I–II, in E♭ I–II
- Trombone I–II–III
- Tuba I–II
- Percussion, including:
  - Snare Drum
  - Bass Drum
  - Cymbals
