= Trombone Concerto (Grøndahl) =

1924 concerto by Launy Grøndahl

Concerto for Trombone and Orchestra was written in 1924 by Danish composer Launy Grøndahl during his time in Italy. It was inspired by the trombone section of the Orchestra of the Casino Theatre in Copenhagen (of which Grøndahl had been a violinist since the age of thirteen). This work was premiered in Copenhagen by the Orchestra of the Casino Theatre with soloist Vilhelm Aarkrogh, the principal trombonist of the orchestra. The work has been recorded by Joseph Alessi, Brett Baker, Håkan Björkman, Jesper Juul Sørensen, Massimo La Rosa, Christian Lindberg, Jacques Mauger, and Branimir Slokar, among others.

== Structure ==
The concerto has a duration of approximately 15 minutes and is cast in three movements:

1. Moderato assai ma molto maestoso (F minor, 3/4)
2. Quasi una Leggenda: Andante grave (B♭ minor, 7/8 and 6/8)
3. Finale: Maestoso – Rondo: Allegretto, scherzando (Introduction: no key signature, 3/4; Rondo: F minor, 6/8)

== Instrumentation ==
The concerto is scored for solo trombone alongside an orchestra composed of 2 flutes, 2 oboes, 2 clarinets in B♭ and A, 2 bassoons, 2 horns in F, 2 trumpets in B♭ and A, timpani, piano, and strings.

Additional versions exist for solo trombone and concert band, solo trombone and brass band, and solo trombone and piano. There is also a version for solo trombone and brass ensemble, edited by Michael Stewart, scored for 3 trumpets, 2 horns, 2 trombones, euphonium and tuba.
