= Trombone Concerto (Wagner) =

Trombone concerto

The Concerto for Trombone and Orchestra is a trombone concerto by the American composer Melinda Wagner. The work was commissioned by the New York Philharmonic for their principal trombonist Joseph Alessi. It was given its premiere at Avery Fisher Hall on February 22, 2007, by Alessi and the New York Philharmonic under the conductor Lorin Maazel. The piece is dedicated to Lorin Maazel and the New York Philharmonic.

A recording of Wagner's Trombone Concerto was released by Bridge Records in 2011, featuring trombonist Joseph Alessi with the New York Philharmonic conducted by Lorin Maazel (Music of Melinda Wagner - Bridge 9345).

== Composition ==
The Trombone Concerto has a duration of roughly 24 minutes and is composed in three movements:

1. Satyr
2. Elemental Things; Litany
3. Catch

== Reception ==
Reviewing the world premiere, Anne Midgette of The New York Times wrote of the concerto, "It is thickly sown with interesting sounds — not sound effects, but a range of timbres and textures, partly supplied by a large and varied battery of four percussionists, woven into the fabric of the music." She added, "Ms. Wagner writes strikingly well for orchestra; this piece used the whole spectrum of colors available to her without ever becoming dense or cloying."
