= Troorkh =

Composition by Iannis Xenakis

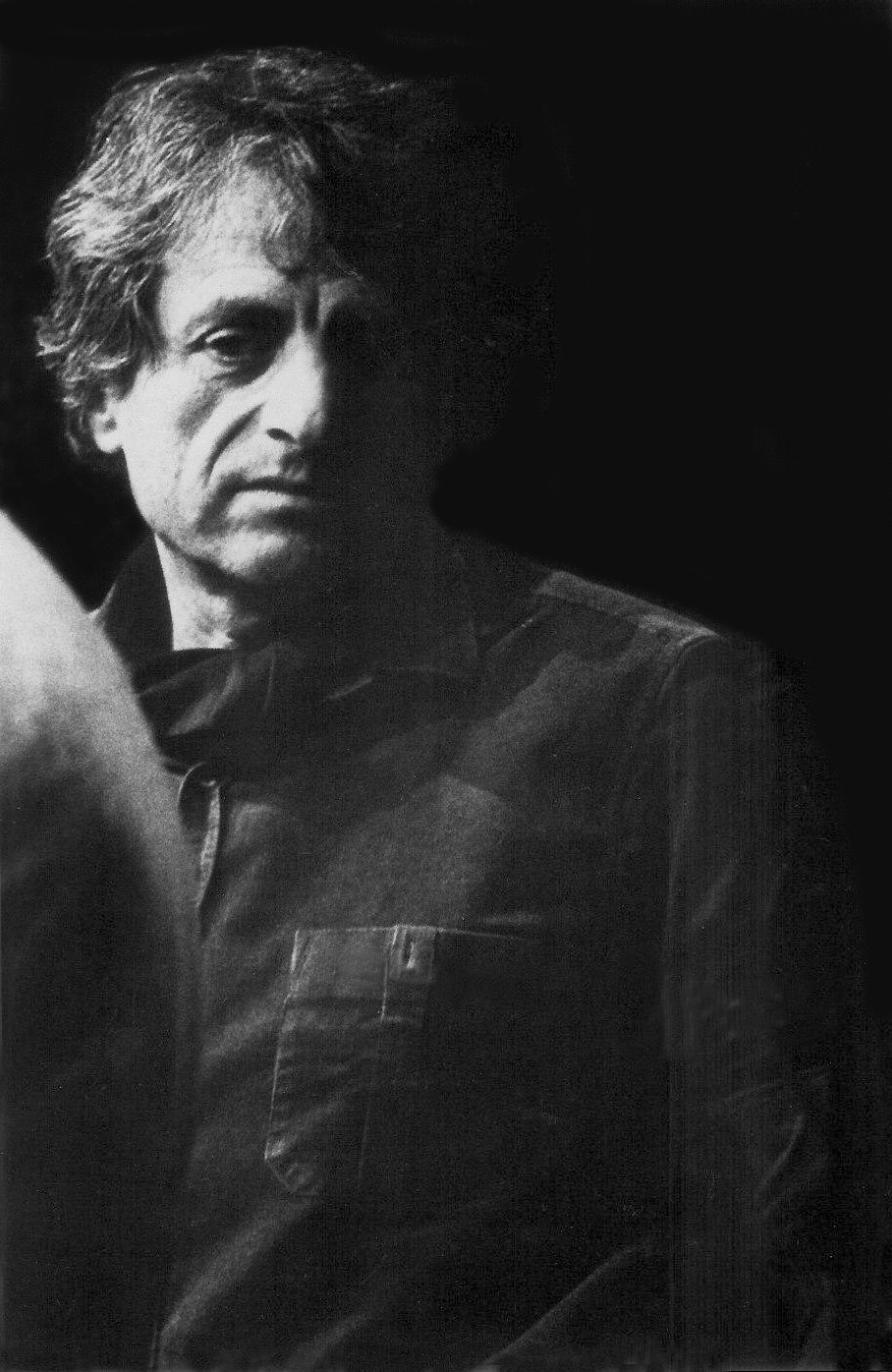
Iannis Xenakis in 1975

Troorkh is a composition for trombone and orchestra by Greek composer Iannis Xenakis. It was commissioned by Swedish Radio for Swedish trombonist Christian Lindberg, to whom it is dedicated, and was completed in 1991. It was premiered on March 26, 1993 at Berwald Hall in Stockholm by the Swedish Radio Orchestra under Esa-Pekka Salonen, with Lindberg as the soloist.

== Composition ==
In November 1985, Christian Lindberg traveled from Stockholm to Paris to meet with Xenakis. Unfortunately, his train was delayed by seven hours, and Xenakis was only able to spend a few minutes with him. During that brief meeting, Lindberg asked Xenakis if he would consider composing a trombone concerto. Xenakis declined, and Lindberg left, disappointed. However, two years later, to Lindberg's surprise, Xenakis sent him the music for Keren, a solo trombone piece written for Benny Sluchin. Despite the presence of some extremely difficult passages, Lindberg proceeded to learn the piece and sent Xenakis a recording. Xenakis responded, thanking Lindberg, and stating that he could have a trombone concerto written by June 1991.

In June 1991, Xenakis presented the score of Troorkh to Lindberg, who quickly realized that the work presented some extreme challenges. Lindberg recalled:

I knew that Iannis Xenakis had been fascinated by the way I had interpreted the very high notes in Keren; actually he went out of his way to put a lot of these very high notes in the concerto! Luckily enough, I had more than a year to study the piece. At first sight, the score looks extremely frightening. So you need this long preparation time. Two decisions were necessary and in the end they were the right ones. First, I decided very quickly to build a completely new learning system in order to strengthen the endurance of my lips. Secondly, I took the decision to learn every single part of the score, orchestra parts included, by heart. You need to get the piece 'into your bones' in order to perform it correctly. So I performed the premiere by heart...

Lindberg worked on the piece for two years. At the premiere, he received a standing ovation, and Xenakis presented him with 28 red roses, half a rose for each of the 56 high Fs in the trombone part. Reflecting on his experience, Lindberg wrote:

...this fantastic work with its amazing power... requires 'devotion', even for a highly skilled young instrumentalist of today... you still need to be a courageous musician and have a vision for yourself to embody his aesthetics. For instance, in the middle of the piece, you have to take care not to over-stretch your muscles; the pressure has been so great for so long that you risk feeling unable to continue. More than that, you also have to take care that your orchestral partners take the work (and the preparation time) as seriously and correctly as they usually do for the classical repertoire. Even in a case like Troorkh, in which the orchestral part is very much accompanimental and is as precisely written as in any concerto of the classical repertoire, the conductor has to be very supportive; for example by taking care to avoid any kind of vibrato, ensuring a continuous glissando playing, and balancing the dynamics.

Lindberg also stated that, in subsequent performances, he would play Leopold Mozart's Trombone Concerto followed immediately by Troorkh on the first part of a concert. Following the success of Troorkh, Lindberg helped arrange the commission of Zythos for trombone and 6 percussionists, then premiered the work in October 1997 with Ensemble Kroumata.

== Music ==
The title of Troorkh comes from "trombone" and "orchestra": "in ancient Greek, orkh means 'orchestra'... while tro stands for 'trombone'." Troorkh is a single movement composition; the Xenakis web site lists the duration as 17 minutes. The score calls for 89 musicians : 4 flutes, 4 oboes, 4 clarinets, 4 bassoons, 4 horns, 4 trumpets, 4 trombones, 1 tuba, 16 first violins, 14 second violins, 12 violas, 10 cellos, and 8 double basses. (There are no percussion instruments.)

Xenakis biographer James Harley described Troorkh as an "exuberant, energetic work" which is "strongly colored by the expansion of the timbre and character of the soloist through the orchestral trombones, and by extension, the brass section as a whole," noting that the soloist is "present during almost two-thirds of the piece, most often in contrast to, or in consort with, the orchestral brass." According to Harley, "The formal organization of the music melds with the dramatic considerations in ways that allow the single voice to project above, through, against, and in conjunction with, the imposing forces of the full orchestra." He also noted that "[t]he prominence of the brass throughout much of Troorkh, together with the frequent use of massed cluster glissando clusters in the strings at full-out dynamic levels, creates an enormous amount of sonic energy. This is a piece that should definitely be heard live!"

According to C Anders Jallén, in Troorkh, "The role of the orchestra is mainly to create acoustic spaces;" it "becomes a single body of sound; if one perceives melodies this is owing to the ear's tendency to register high frequencies. In contrast to music which uses different forms of culminations, Xenakis['s] stated intention in regards to Troorkh was that 'the climax is at the beginning and it never stops'."

== Recordings ==
- Dedicated to Christian Lindberg (Berio/Xenakis/Turnage) – Christian Lindberg, trombone; Oslo Philharmonic Orchestra; Peter Rundel, conductor (BIS-SACD-1638) – 2007
- musica viva München, Vol. 6 – Iannis Xenakis: Anastenaria, Troorkh, Aïs – Mike Svoboda, trombone; Symphonieorchester des Bayerischen Rundfunks; Peter Rundel, conductor (Col Legno WWE 1CD 20086) – 2003 (live recording)
