= Trombone Concerto (MacMillan) =

Concerto by James MacMillan

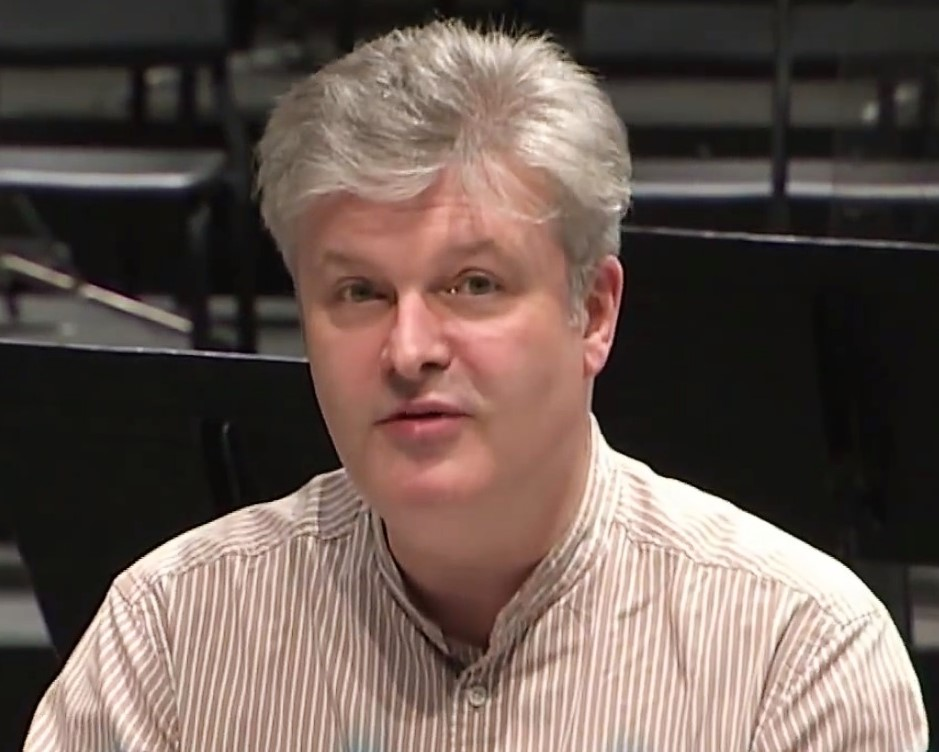
James MacMillan in 2012

The Trombone Concerto is a composition for trombone and orchestra written by the Scottish composer James MacMillan. The work was commissioned by the Royal Concertgebouw Orchestra for their principal trombonist Jörgen van Rijen and co-commissioned by a consortium of orchestras comprising the Dallas Symphony Orchestra, Royal Flemish Philharmonic Orchestra, the Orchestre de la Suisse Romande, the Oulu Symphony Orchestra, and the Philharmonisches Orchester des Staatstheaters Cottbus. It was first performed by Jörgen van Rijen and the Royal Concertgebouw Orchestra under the direction of Iván Fischer at the Concertgebouw, Amsterdam, on 20 April 2017. The piece is dedicated to Jörgen van Rijen and in memory of Sara Maria MacMillan, the composer's granddaughter, who died shortly before its composition.

== Composition ==
The music is cast in one continuous movement and has a duration of roughly 30 minutes in performance.

=== Instrumentation ===
The work is scored for a solo trombone and a large orchestra consisting of three flutes (3rd doubling piccolo), two oboes, cor anglais, two clarinets, bass clarinet, two bassoons, contrabassoon, four horns, three trumpets, two additional trombones, bass trombone, tuba, timpani, two percussionists, harp, piano, and strings.

== Reception ==
The Trombone Concerto has been well received by music critics. Reviewing the United States premiere in Dallas, Scott Cantrell of The Dallas Morning News wrote, "Twenty-nine minutes long, in multiple contrasting sections played without pause, it definitely exploits the trombone's wide-ranging possibilities and a vast array of orchestral textures." Wayne Lee Gay of the Texas Classical Review called it "a grandly ambitious and assertive work, cast in a single, continuous and eventful rhapsodic movement." Reviewing a performance by the BBC Scottish Symphony Orchestra, Ken Walton of The Scotsman similarly described the piece as "[a] heartrending work, no holds barred."

== See also ==
- List of compositions by James MacMillan
