= Trombone Concerto (Shilkret) =

1942 musical composition

Concerto for Trombone is a 1942 instrumental crossover work in three movements, which trombonist Tommy Dorsey, one of the best known musical entertainment stars of his time, commissioned from Nathaniel Shilkret, a noted conductor and composer of music for recording, radio and film.

Shilkret describes the first movement as "in classic form, but in the middle I introduced a fugue, partly in jazz form, and near the end I wrote the main theme in fox-trot rhythm." The second movement has a blues mood and the third movement is in a boogie-woogie rhythm. The blues second movement is a 1943 replacement of the original "negro spiritual" arrangement. The original second movement has never been performed. A cadenza in the first movement is written to include the use of multiphonics, although the earliest performances of the piece did not use this technique.

== Early history ==
The concerto was first orchestrated in 1943 for a full orchestra. Dorsey rehearsed the piece using this orchestration while working on a motion picture for MGM. When Dorsey left Hollywood and was working with his own ensemble, a new orchestration was made for Dorsey's group.

Dorsey had contracted with Werner Janssen for ten performances with Janssen's Symphony Orchestra of Los Angeles, with the first performance scheduled for February 6, 1944. There was some publicity announcing these performances, but Dorsey was not available, and there were never any performances, despite claims in the liner notes to the LP Ecstasy to the contrary.

The premier performance was by the New York City Symphony, directed by Leopold Stokowski, with Dorsey as soloist, broadcast over WNYC on February 15, 1945. WNYC recorded and has re-broadcast this performance several times through the years. The performance was part of one of Stokowski's student concerts at New York City Center.

Stokowski, directing the Hollywood Bowl Orchestra, with Hoyt Bohannon (who was a sergeant in the army at the time) as soloist, performed the concerto on July 28, 1945, in the Hollywood Bowl. Dorsey was originally contacted to be the soloist for the Hollywood Bowl performance, but a mutually acceptable price for the performance was never reached.

Dorsey and Shilkret planned to make a Victor recording of the concerto, and Dorsey had asked Shilkret to write an arrangement that allowed for more resting places in the solo. Shilkret arranged the piece with the solo split between trombone and piano, and plans were made for Shilkret to conduct a Victor recording with Dorsey and Jose Iturbi. Shortly before the planned recording date, Dorsey signed a contract with Decca, and a recording at the Victor studio was not possible.

Shilkret recorded an arrangement for trombone, piano and chamber orchestra in November 1947, with trombone solo by Will Bradley (Wilbur Schwitchtenberg) and piano solo by Leonard Pennario. The recording had a limited pressing as Aztec 248 (Aztec was a label belonging to Nathaniel Shilkret Music Company, which was owned by Shilkret's son Arthur), but the recording was never issued commercially.

In 1944 Shilkret and Phil Moore wrote a dance arrangement of the third movement of the concerto entitled "Specie Americano." This was recorded as one of the first pressings of the Discovery label. It was released in 1948 as Discovery 1200 (a twelve-inch 78 rpm) with the title "Concerto for Trombone--Parts 1 and 2," recorded by the Phil Moore Orchestra, with Murray McEachern as trombone soloist. The liner notes to the recording say that the dance arrangement was "first performed 1946 by Paul Barron with the CBS Symphony Orchestra. Soloist Will Bradley."

Shilkret wrote "The Crazy Cool Musician in Between," with lyrics by Art Sydney, as a popular song based on the third movement of the concerto. Barbara Shilkret, daughter-in-law of Nathaniel Shilkret and owner of Nathaniel Shilkret Music Company from 1982 to 2004, claimed a 45 rpm recording by artist Phil Leeds was made of the song on the Aztec label. No such recording has ever been found in the Shilkret archives. However, a July 21, 1953, air check of the female vocal group, the Metrotones, singing the song on WHAS-AM (CBS) is in the Shilkret archives. WHAS was the Louisville, KY radio station with which Art Sydney was affiliated.

An August 19, 1954, press release announced, "WNBC concert Sunday, August 29, 1954, directed by [Le]Roy Shield, will play the first radio performance of Maria del Carmen (Granados) and Concerto for Trombone and Orchestra by Nathaniel Shilkret, with Neal di Biase, formerly first trombonist with the NBC Symphony, as soloist.” Granados biographer Walter A. Clark confirms that the concert was broadcast.

Shilkret was a guest on the July 3, 1956, broadcast of The Classical Disc Jockey, hosted by Tom Baxter, on the Los Angeles radio station KABC AM/FM, and the broadcast ended with an excerpt of the third movement of the concerto. A copy of the broadcast is in the Shilkret archives.

Shilkret continued to write new arrangements of the concerto into the early 1960s. An April 19, 1961, letter from noted trombonist Davis Schuman, to whom Shilkret had given a copy of the original version of the concerto to check, before sending it to Dorsey, that the piece was playable, asks whether a band arrangement had been published. Shilkret's handwritten note drafting a reply indicated that a band arrangement was written, but not yet published. The premier performance of the second and third movements of the band arrangement was in July 2003, and the full three movements of the band arrangement was first played in October 2004.

Other arrangements and derivative works include Monkey Junction, another popular arrangement of the third movement, Blue Tint, a cornet solo based on the second movement, and Carnival, a banjo solo arrangement of the third movement. None of these works have been performed as of 2010.

Shilkret's son Arthur, the publisher for the concerto did not pursue further exploitation of the concerto, nor did his wife Barbara Shilkret, who became publisher upon Arthur's death in 1982. Thus, the concerto languished in total anonymity for over forty years.

== Recent history ==
In 1995 Bryan Free, a trombonist with the Royal Scottish National Orchestra for many years, read about the Stokowski-Dorsey performance of the concerto and set about discovering its history, trying to obtain a sound recording and written music that would make it available for orchestras to play, and publicizing its history. From the early history of the piece, it is clear that information about the concerto was difficult to find, and an audio copy of the concerto was even more difficult to obtain. When Free obtained contact information for and wrote to and called Barbara Shilkret, her responses were slow, but finally resulted in her giving the Library of Congress permission to send Free a copy of the trombone solo and a piano reduction. Free also did obtain a copy of the WNYC recording of the Stokowski-Dorsey performance. In 1999 the results of his research to that date were published in the official magazine of the British Trombone Society.

The year 2000 brought two significant advances to Free's effort to revive the concerto. First, Nathaniel Shilkret's grandson, Niel Shell, had begun organizing the Shilkret archives and eventually was able to make all the written music available to Free, who transcribed over a period of several years the full orchestra, band and chamber orchestra arrangements using Sibelius music notation software. Free's progress in reviving the concerto was the subject of a cover story in the quarterly magazine of the International Trombone Association.

Second, Free's 1999 article attracted the attention of the prominent trombonist Jim Pugh, who had long been aware of the concerto and had wanted to obtain the music in order to perform it, but, as he had said in a WNYC radio interview, Bryan Free "had more tenacity and perseverance." Pugh contacted Free and from Free and the Shilkret family was also given access to the written music. Pugh immediately started looking for venues to perform and or record the concerto and provided material assistance in proofreading the transcribed scores. His first success came when he convinced Skitch Henderson to direct the 21st century “re-premier” of the concerto, with his New York Pops Orchestra, featuring Pugh as soloist, at Carnegie Hall. The performance was on January 17, 2003. Pugh followed this with the world premier of the second and third movements of the band arrangement in July 2003, the first 21st century performance of the chamber orchestra arrangement in March 2004, the first 21st century recording of the concerto, with the Colorado Symphony Orchestra directed by Jeff Tyzik, in July 2004 (a recording by Swedish trombone virtuoso Christian Lindberg was to follow four weeks later), and the world premier of the complete band arrangement in October 2004. Pugh has continued to perform the concerto.

In February 2026, the Concerto was published and made available to the general public by brass music publisher, Cherry Classics Music. This piano reduction of the orchestral version was created by the composer and edited for playability with some minor simplification by Anthony Patterson and Jim Pugh.

== Recordings ==
Format: Recording Date: Ensemble, director, soloist(s); Album Title, Recording Company and number. (Comments)

- February 15, 1945: New York City Symphony Orchestra, conducted by Leopold Stokowski, trombone soloist Tommy Dorsey; (World Premiere); 20th Century Americana, Guild Historical GHCD 2424. (Issued 2016.)
- November 12 and 17, 1947: Chamber Orchestra, directed Nathaniel Shilkret, trombone soloist Will Bradley, piano soloist Leonard Pennario; Concerto for Trombone, Aztec 248. (Never issued.)
- December 1948: Phil Moore Orchestra, directed Phil Moore, trombone soloist Murray McEachern; Concerto for Trombone, Parts 1 and 2, Discovery 1200. (Dance arrangement of third movement.)
- July 8, 2004: Colorado Symphony Orchestra, directed Jeff Tyzik, trombone soloist Jim Pugh; X Over Trombone, Albany TROY926. (Issued 2007.)
- August 4 and 5, 2004: São Paulo Symphony Orchestra, directed John Neschling, trombone soloist Christian Lindberg; Christian Lindberg Plays Nathaniel Shilkret and Works by Christian Lindberg and Fredrik Höberg, BIS BIS-SACD-1448.
- October 23, 2008: United States Air Force Academy Band, directed Lt. Col. Larry H. Lang, trombone soloist Master Sergeant Randy Schneider; Windscapes, United States Air Force Academy Band (unnumbered). (Movements 2 and 3 only; issued in CD format for Department of the Air Force use only; licensed for digital downloads by Altissimo! with song titles "Concerto for Trombone I, Andante con moto" and "Concerto for Trombone II, Allegro", respectively.)
