= Colors for Trombone =

Concerto by Bert Appermont

Colors for Trombone is a concerto for solo trombone and concert band. It was composed in 1998 by Belgian composer Bert Appermont in Ravels. It was written for Belgian trombonist Ben Haemhouts. The piece is in four movements, each based on a color, and characterizes a typical musical quality:

1. Yellow – inspiring and stimulating, (also: wisdom and light)
2. Red – dynamic, passionate developing into dramatic, furious and fighting (also: courage and will-power)
3. Blue – melancholic, dreamy and introvert (also: truth and peace)
4. Green – hopeful and full of expectation (also: balanced power and harmony)

The work exists in versions for solo trombone and brass band, fanfare band, and piano.

This piece is widely considered a virtuoso piece of trombone literature and is frequently performed. A performance of the composition usually lasts around 15 minutes.

== Recordings ==
- Breeze in the Hearts, Bloom in the World - Takenori Yoshikawa, trombone; Iku Miwa, piano (Octavia Records Cryston OVCC-00088) - 2011
- Colors - Akira Kuwata, trombone; Tokai University Dai-yon High School Wind Orchestra; Shigeyoshi Ida, conductor (Cafua Records CACG-0079) - 2006
- Colors - Ben Haemhouts, trombone; Symphonic Windorchestra Conservatory Antwerp; Dirk De Caluwe, conductor (World Wind Music WWM 500.054) - 1999
- Visions - Joseph Alessi, trombone; Columbus State University Wind Ensemble; Robert Rumbelow, conductor (Summit Records DCD 486) - 2008
- When I Walk Alone - Lito Fontana, trombone; Fausto Quintabà, piano (RCR 0981) - 2002
