= Trombone Concerto in C (Rota) =

1966 Concerto by Nino Rota

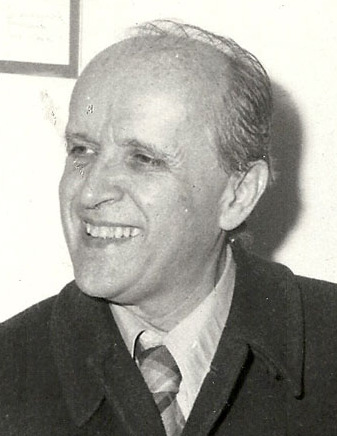
Nino Rota in 1976

The Concerto per Trombone e Orchestra in C was composed by Italian composer Nino Rota in 1966. The concerto is in three movements:

1. Allegro giusto
2. Lento, ben ritmato
3. Allegro moderato

This concerto was given its premiere performance on March 6, 1969, at the Conservatorio di Musica "Giuseppe Verdi" in Milano, Italy, by trombonist Bruno Ferrari (to whom the work is dedicated), with the Orchestra I Pomeriggi Musicali conducted by Franco Caracciolo.

A performance of the concerto usually lasts around 13 minutes.

== Instrumentation ==
This score is written for solo trombone and orchestra, with the following instrumentation:

Woodwinds

1 flute
1 oboe
2 clarinets in B♭
2 bassoons

Brass

2 horns in F

Percussion

timpani

Strings

1st violins
2nd violins
violas
cellos
double basses

== Recordings ==
=== with orchestra ===
- 1988 International Competition for Musical Performers, Geneva (Musica Helvetica MH 72.2) - 1989
  - Jonas Bylund, trombone; Orchestre de la Suisse Romande; Joaquin da Silva Pereira, conductor.
- All The Lonely People (BIS-CD-568) - 1993
  - Christian Lindberg, trombone; Tapiola Sinfonietta; Osmo Vänskä, conductor.
- Deutscher Musikwettbewerb - 2007 Award Winner (Genuin Classics GEN 11188) - 2011
  - Frederic Belli, trombone; SWR Sinfonieorchester Baden-Baden und Freiburg; Pablo Heras-Casado, conductor.
- Nino Rota: Concertos (Chandos CHAN 9954) - 2002
  - Andrea Conti, trombone; I Virtuosi Italiani; Marzio Conti, conductor.
- Nino Rota: Orchestral Works, Vol. 2 (Decca 4810394) - 2013
  - Giuliano Rizzotto, trombone; Orchestra Sinfonica di Milano Giuseppe Verdi; Giuseppe Grazioli, conductor.
- Nino Rota: La Strada; Concertos (ATMA Classique ACD22294) - 2003
  - Alain Trudel, trombone; Orchestre Métropolitain du Grand Montréal, Yannick Nézet-Séguin, conductor.
- Trombone Concertos (Claves CD 9606) - 1996
  - Branimir Slokar, trombone; Berliner Symphoniker; Lior Shambadal, conductor.

=== with piano reduction ===
- Colors (Octavia Records Cryston OVCC-00137) - 2017
  - Kyoichiro Kori, trombone; Atsuko Kaminaga, piano.
