= Nat Shilkret =

American musician, composer, conductor and musical director (1889–1982)

Nathaniel Shilkret
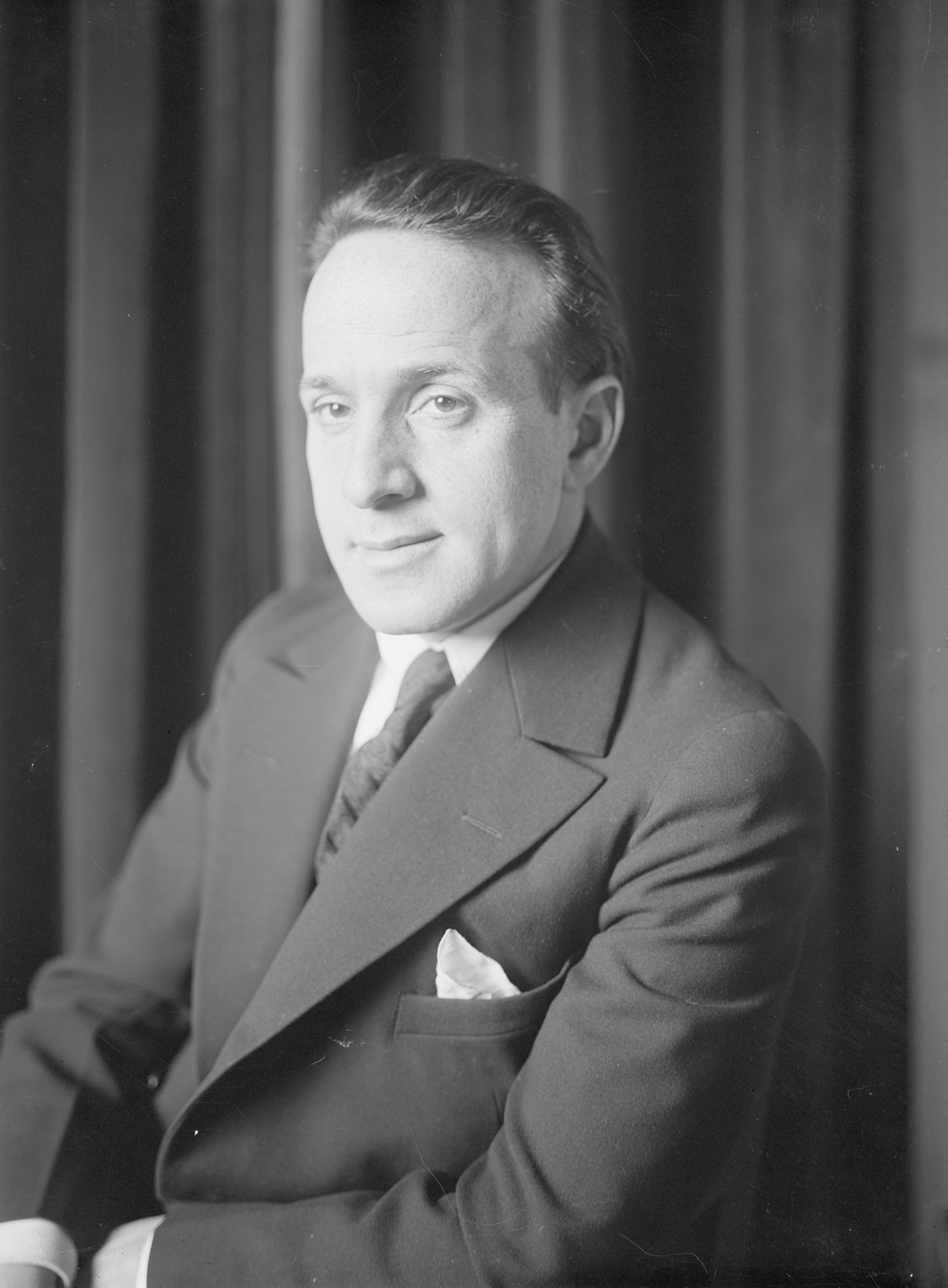
- Shilkret in the 1920s

Background information
- Also known as: Nat Shilkret
- Born: Natan Schüldkraut; December 25, 1889; New York City, US
- Died: February 18, 1982 (aged 92) Franklin Square, New York, US
- Occupations: Musician; composer; conductor; musical director
- Instruments: Clarinet, piano
- Spouse(s): Anne Finston (m. 1914); 1 child

Nathaniel Shilkret (December 25, 1889 – February 18, 1982) was an American musician, composer, conductor and musical director.

== Early life and family ==
Nathaniel "Nat" Shilkret (originally named Natan Schüldkraut) was born in New York City on Christmas Day 1889. His parents, Rose and William Shilkret, had emigrated from Lemberg (now Lviv in Ukraine). The Shilkret family lived in the East Side of Manhattan until Nat was fifteen years old when they moved into a home his parents purchased in Bushwick, Brooklyn. He attended The City College of New York for one year.

Nat's father was a musician and his dad began teaching him to play the clarinet at the age of four. Both he and his older brother, Lew Shilkret, studied piano with Louis Gruenberg in their growing up years. Lew later was music director of the El Kadia Concert Orchestra in Atlantic City in the 1920s, and also made a small number of recordings as an organist for the Victor Talking Machine Company. Nat later studied piano with Charles Hambitzer who was also the teacher of George Gershwin.

Nat and Lou's younger brother Jack Shilkret also had a career in music; working as a pianist, composer of music for film, and as a music director for dance bands, radio, and the movies. Their youngest brother, Harry Shilkret, became a medical doctor but was also active as a trumpeter in Nathaniel's orchestra. He paid for his medical school tuition at the Yale School of Medicine by performing as a jazz cornetist in venues in New Haven in the mid 1920s. Harry also recorded professionally as a jazz trumpeter with both Nat's orchestra and Jack's orchestra, and with musicians like Rudy Vallee and Jimmy Ray.

== Early career ==
Shilkret was a child prodigy, and at the age of seven he toured the United States at the clarinet soloist with the New York Boys' Orchestra. He continued to perform with this group for the next six years. At the age of thirteen he began performing as a clarinetist in professional orchestras. He played in a variety of groups as a teenager. These included the Russian Symphony Orchestra (led by Modest Altschuler), Victor Herbert's Orchestra, Arnold Volpe's Orchestra, Sousa's Grand Concert Band, Edwin Franko Goldman's band, and Arthur Pryor's Band. He also played with several of New York's top orchestras; including the New York Philharmonic Society, (under Vasily Safonov and Gustav Mahler), the New York Symphony Orchestra, and the orchestra of the Metropolitan Opera. He was also a rehearsal pianist for Walter Damrosch, playing for stars who included dancer Isadora Duncan.

== Marriage and work with the Victor Talking Machine Company ==
In June 1914 Shilkret married Anne Finston. Anne was the sister of Nathaniel W. Finston who was Nat's best friend. Nathaniel Finston was also a musician, and had previously directed a band Shilkret played in at a resort in the Catskill Mountains. A violinist and conductor, Finston later served as head of the music department at Metro-Goldwyn-Mayer and was Nat's boss at that studio.

In 1915 Shilkret was hired by Edward T. King to join the staff of the Victor Talking Machine Company (VTMC, later RCA Victor) as an arranger and conductor. He initially worked in the Foreign Department of the VTMC, and in 1920 was promoted to manager of that department. He concurrently worked as a session musician for recordings made by the VTMC's Export Department. He made his first recording as music director of Victor's International Novelty Orchestra on March 2, 1922.

In 1924, Shilkret became "director of light music" for Victor; a position he remained in until 1935. He founded the Victor Salon Orchestra in 1924; a group with whom he made dozens of best selling recordings during the 1920s and 1930s. He directed thousands of recordings for RCA Victor; with the Discography of American Historical Recordings cataloguing more than 5,000 recordings in which he was involved as either a conductor, composer, arranger, or instrumentalist. He was one of the top popular band leaders of the 1920s and 1930s and was considered a rival to Paul Whiteman. While the majority of his recordings were of popular music or of lighter classical music faire, he also provided orchestral accompaniments for serious grand opera singers like sopranos Lucrezia Bori and Mary Garden, and tenors Beniamino Gigli, Richard Crooks, and John McCormack.

He was the conductor of choice for many of Victor's innovative recordings. He conducted Victor's first record made by the electrical process in 1925, the first commercial (albeit unsuccessful) Victor Long Playing record in 1931, and was the first conductor to successfully dub an electrically recorded orchestral accompaniment over the acoustically recorded vocals of Enrico Caruso, Victor's star recording artist, who died in 1921, before electrical recording was developed. He conducted the premiere recording of George Gershwin's symphonic poem An American in Paris in 1929. It was one of five conducted by Shilkret that later earned Grammy Awards. Shilkret also conducted Paul Whiteman's Orchestra in the first electrical recording of Gershwin's Rhapsody in Blue in 1927 (after Whiteman refused to conduct following a disagreement with Gershwin).

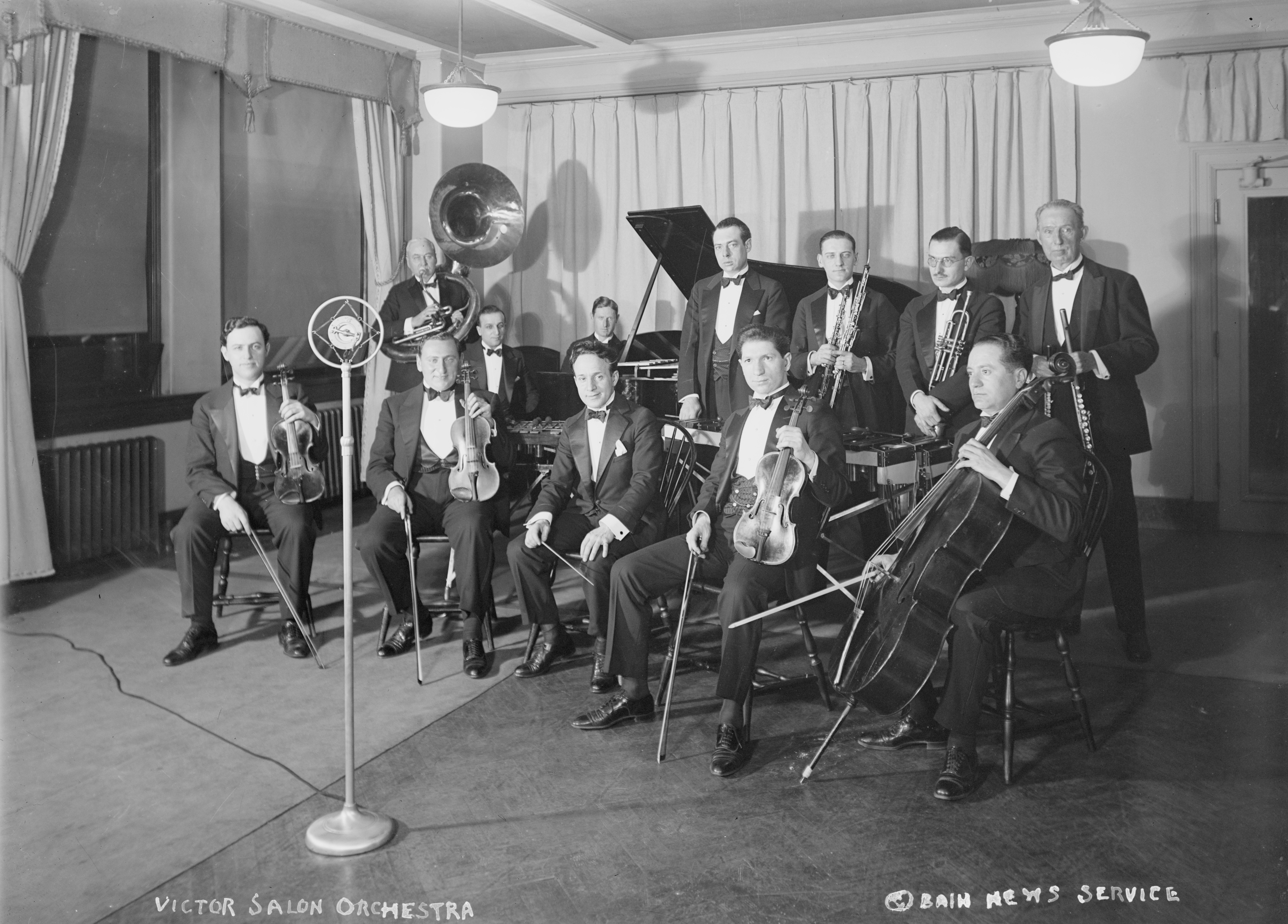
Shilkret (center holding baton) with the Victor Salon Orchestra, c. 1925

In 1932, he commissioned a short jazz-band piece from the English composer Gustav Holst, which Holst entitled Mr Shilkret's Maggot.

== Radio and the recording studio ==
He was also one of radio's early stars, estimating that he made over 3000 broadcasts between 1925 and 1941, including being the conductor for The Eveready Hour, regarded as the first major commercial broadcast and the first major variety show. His sponsors included Camel, Carnation, Chesterfield, Esso, Eveready, General Electric, General Motors, Hires Root Beer, Knickerbocker, Lysol, Maxwell House, Mobil Oil, Palmolive, RCA Victor, Salada tea and Smith Brothers' Cough Drops.

Between his conducting for records and for radio, virtually every musical star of the day performed under the baton of Nathaniel Shilkret. His orchestra members included Jimmy Dorsey, Tommy Dorsey, Benny Goodman, Lionel Hampton, Glenn Miller, Artie Shaw, Mike Mosiello, Joe Lipman and Del Staigers, George Gershwin, Jascha Heifetz, Mischa Elman and Andrés Segovia all played under his direction. Opera stars Rose Bampton, Lucrezia Bori, Feodor Chaliapin, Richard Crooks, Miguel Fleta, Emilio de Gogorza, Amelita Galli-Curci, Mary Garden, Beniamino Gigli, Helen Jepson, Maria Jeritza, Giovanni Martinelli, Nino Martini, John McCormack, James Melton, Grace Moore, Jan Peerce, Lily Pons, Rosa Ponselle, Elisabeth Rethberg, Tito Schipa, Gladys Swarthout, John Charles Thomas, and Lawrence Tibbett were all conducted by Nathaniel Shilkret in their recordings of light-classical and popular songs. The lists of popular singers and foreign artists that played under his direction are just as impressive.

== Compositions ==
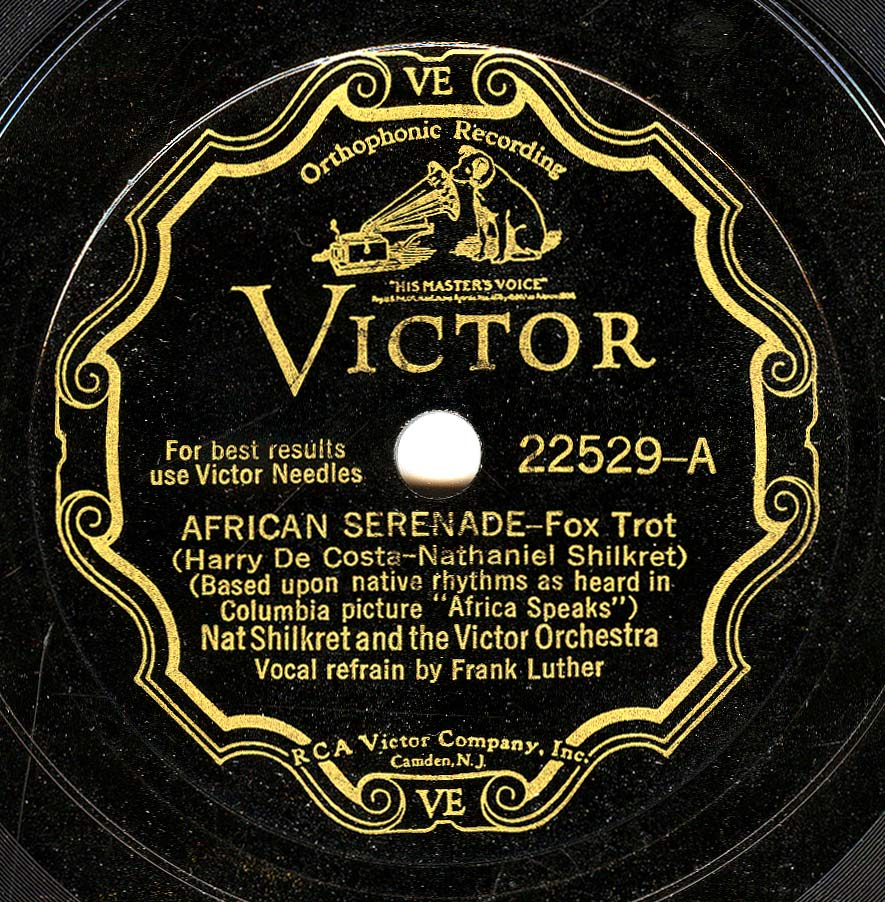
African Serenade, a 1930 issue of a Nathaniel Shilkret composition recorded with the Victor orchestra

Shilkret studied music composition and orchestration with Pietro Floridia. He composed and arranged thousands of pieces. His best-known popular composition was "The Lonesome Road", first sung by co-writer Gene Austin, and later by Jules Bledsoe (dubbing Stepin Fetchit) in the final scene of the 1929 part-talkie film version of Show Boat, and recorded by more than two hundred artists.

He composed the theme song "Lady Divine" for the Academy Award-winning film The Divine Lady in 1929. He also composed the theme song "Some Sweet Day" for the film Children of the Ritz in the same year. His composition "Jeannine, I Dream of Lilac Time" sold almost two million copies of sheet music and was also recorded by more than a hundred top artists. His Concerto for Trombone was premiered in 1945 by Tommy Dorsey, playing with the New York Symphony Orchestra, under the direction of Leopold Stokowski.

== Later career ==
Shilkret left RCA Victor in mid-1935, but continued to record occasionally for the company. His last recording released on the Victor label was the American Banjo Album (P-218) recorded in October 1946. This album was reissued shortly after the Victor issue as one side of an LP under the Aztec label.

Shilkret moved to Los Angeles in late 1935 and there contributed music scores and musical direction for a string of Hollywood films for RKO (as musical director from 1935 to 1937), Walter Lantz Productions (one of the studio's musical directors during 1937) and Metro-Goldwyn-Mayer (as a musical director from 1942 to 1946). His films included Mary of Scotland (1936), Swing Time (1936), The Plough and the Stars (1937), and Shall We Dance (1937) and several films of Laurel and Hardy. He also received an Oscar nomination for his work scoring the film version of Maxwell Anderson's stage drama Winterset (1936).

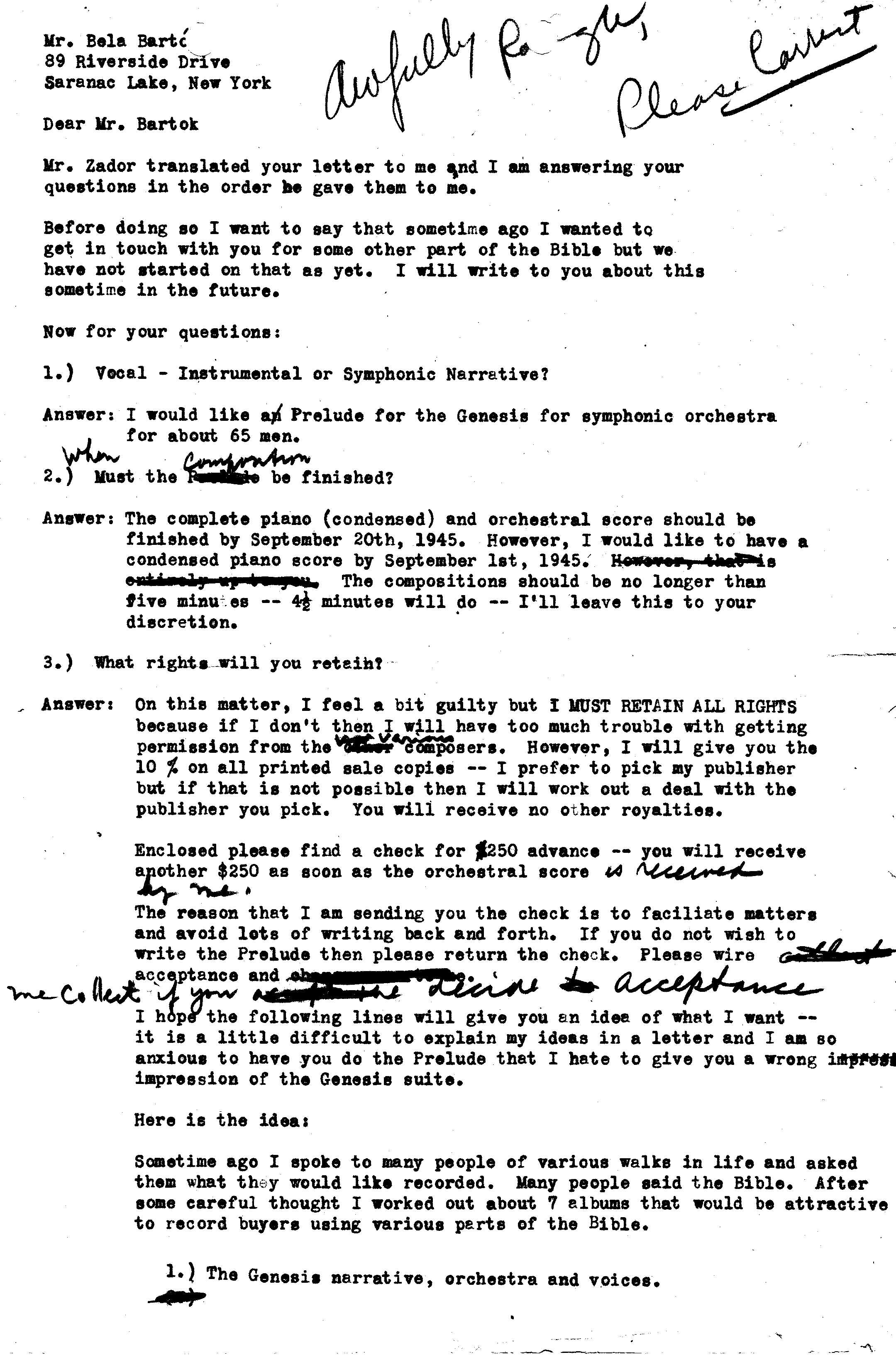
Nathaniel Shilkret's letter to Béla Bartók in 1945.

In 1935 Shilkret was awarded an honorary doctorate by Bethany College of Kansas. In 1939, he conducted a group of soloists (including tenor Jan Peerce) and the Victor Symphony Orchestra for RCA Victor's multi-disc tribute to Victor Herbert, which were recorded following a special NBC radio broadcast, and he recorded a number of other albums in 1939 and 1940. Due to a serious abdominal operation for cancer removal, he did not conduct for most of 1941.

In 1944–45, Shilkret led the collaborative project that created Genesis Suite, a work for narrator, chorus, and orchestra based on the events in the biblical Book of Genesis. This collaboration involved Shilkret, plus six other composers who immigrated to the United States from Europe – most of whom were Jewish – contributing one movement each: Mario Castelnuovo-Tedesco, Darius Milhaud, Arnold Schoenberg, Igor Stravinsky, Alexandre Tansman and Ernst Toch. Shilkret also tried to involve Béla Bartók in the collaborative project, but this was unsuccessful.

He worked at RKO-Pathe, making short films from 1946 through the mid-1950s. During this same period he recorded at least 260 transcriptions for SESAC He was the pit orchestra conductor for the Broadway show Paris '90 in 1952.

Shilkret wrote the music for a brief 1951 documentary film, Flying Padre, that was directed by a young Stanley Kubrick.

He lived in his son's home in Franklin Square, New York from the mid-1950s, until his death in 1982. He was a great-uncle of actress Julie Warner.
