= Launy Grøndahl =

Danish musician (1886–1960)

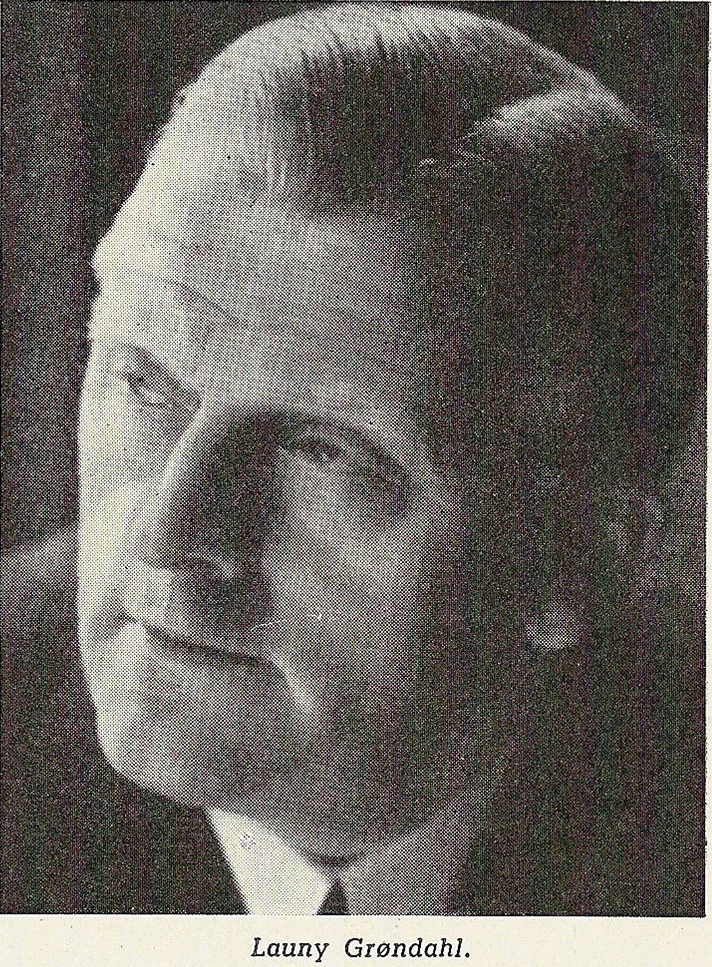
Launy Grøndahl

Launy Grøndahl (30 June 1886 – 21 January 1960) was a Danish conductor and composer. Grøndahl studied the violin from the age of eight. His first work as a professional musician was as a violinist with the Orchestra of the Casino Theatre in Copenhagen, aged thirteen.

He was also for a long period (1925–1956) the resident conductor of the Danish National Symphony Orchestra. Launy Valdemar Grondahl is known to posterity for two things: his distinguished 31–year conducting career with the Danish National Radio Symphony Orquestra, and his Trombone Concerto dating from 1924.

Launy Grøndahl was born in Denmark on 30 June 1886. He began his studies with Anton Bloch, Ludolf Nielsen and Axel Gade, and what marks his life as a violinist and composer was a scholarship from the Kobenhavns Orkestreforenings Jubioeumslegat (granting of the Jubilee of the Copenhagen Orchestral Association) in the summer of 1924. This thanks to the manager of the Vacuum Oil Company, Carls A. Muchaelsen, had donated kr. 2500 to honor a talented member in connection with the association's 25th anniversary jubilee on 25 April 1924. With the Grøndahl scholarship, the recipient can tour Europe in search of musical knowledge and maturation in Paris, Vienna and Milan, among other cities.

== Notable works ==
Some of his first works included a symphony, works for small string ensembles and a violin concerto.

He is best known for his Trombone Concerto, written in 1924 while traveling in Italy. It was reportedly written for the trombone section of the Orchestra of the Casino Theatre in Copenhagen, of which Grøndahl was a member, due to their high standard of playing.

He is also remembered for his pioneering recordings of the symphonies of his compatriot Carl Nielsen and his original score for Benjamin Christensen's silent film Häxan.

Cultural offices
| Preceded by none | Principal Conductors, Danish National Symphony Orchestra; 1925–1927 | Succeeded by Nikolai Malko |
