= Karl Traugott Queisser =

German musician

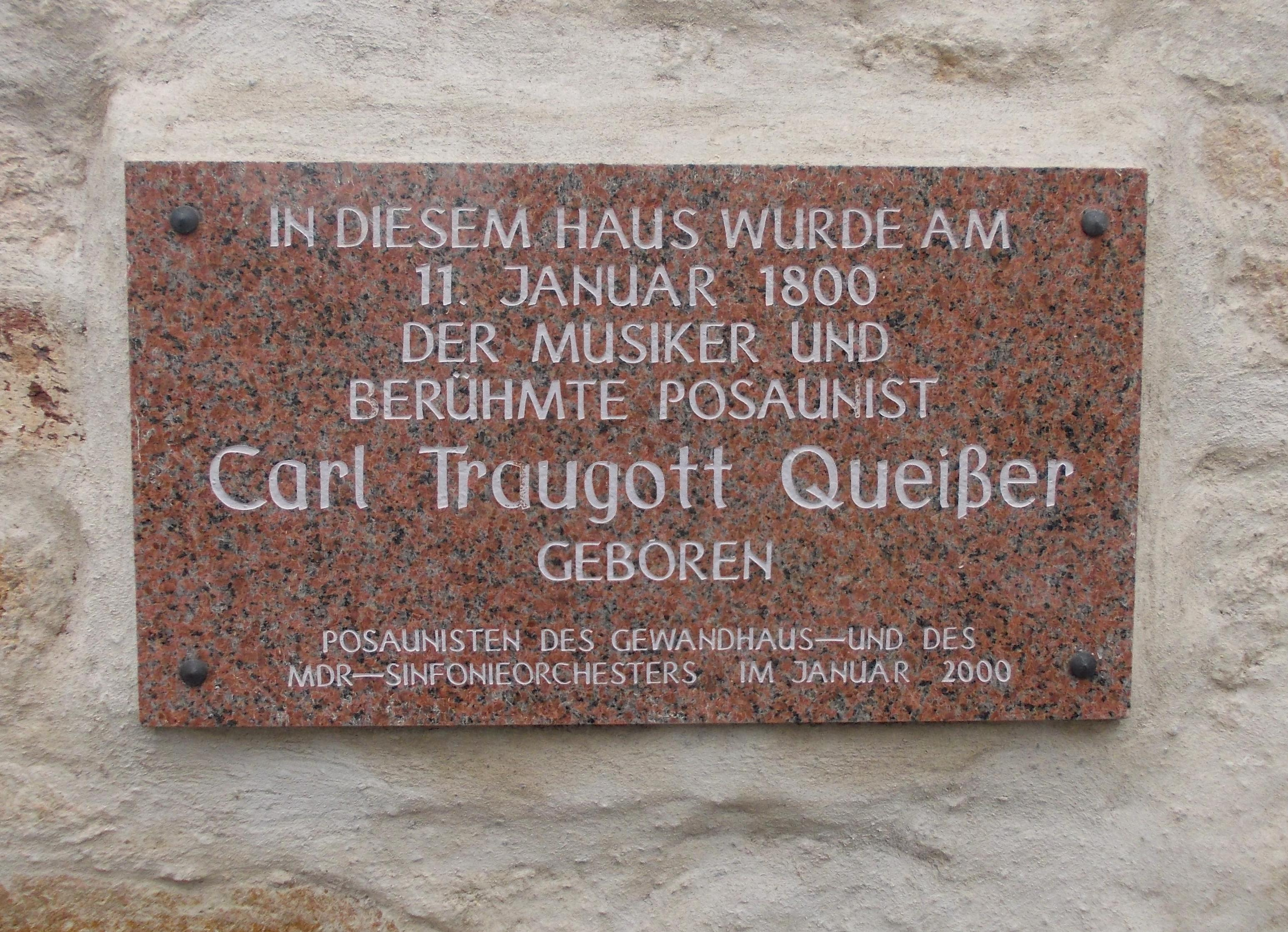

Karl Traugott Queisser (11 January 1800, Döben, Electorate of Saxony – 12 June 1846, Leipzig) played trombone and viola in Germany as a member of the Gewandhaus Orchestra under Felix Mendelssohn.

He was Principal Viola of the Gewandhaus Orchestra from 1820 until 1843, where he also appeared as soloist on 27 occasions (playing trombone?). He was also the violist in the Gewandhaus String Quartet.

When Mendelssohn became conductor of the orchestra in 1835 he was so impressed that he promised to write Queisser a concerto. Owing to his busy schedule and new lover, he persuaded his orchestra's leader Ferdinand David (and 1st violinist in the Gewandhaus String Quartet) to write him a piece. This Concertino remains the most popular 19th-century solo piece for trombone and is dedicated to Queisser.

Queisser was known throughout Germany and performed at many music festivals where other virtuosi included Franz Liszt, Clara Schumann and Niccolò Paganini.

It has been suggested that Queisser was responsible for annoying Mendelssohn by putting a 'turn' in the opening trombone phrase of the 'Lobgesang' 2nd Symphony.
