= Jacques Mauger =

Jacques Mauger was born in Normandy and studied the trombone at the " Conservatoire National Supérieur de Musique de Paris ". A prize-winner at international competitions at Markneukirchen and at Toulon, he started his professional career as first trombone with the Nice Philharmonic Orchestra, and then became trombone soloist with the Paris Opera Orchestra. Since 1990, he has concentrated on working as a concert artist, and has often appeared as a soloist and abroad with ensembles varying from string, and symphony orchestras, to brass and concert bands. He has also made television appearances on ZDF, GLOBO, RAI and MUZZIK in France, and many international composers have composed original works or made special arrangements for him. Jacques Mauger is still active as a teacher at the "Conservatoire à Rayonnement Régional de Paris and the trombone Professor HEMU of Lausanne. He has recorded more than 30 CDs as a soloist.

He is also guest professor at the Senzoku Gaquen University of Tokyo, Japan. He often gives masterclasses in numerous countries: France, the U.K, Japan, Korea, China, Spain, Germany, Switzerland, Holland, the United States, and South America.

In 2007, a new trombone studies collection developed by Mauger in collaboration with composer Jean-Michel Defaye was published by IMD Arpèges in Paris. He also contributed to the development of the AC440 trombone model at the Antoine Courtois Paris brass instrument factory, joining the company in 2008. He has given masterclasses in numerous countries, including France, the United Kingdom, Japan, Korea, China, Spain, Germany, Switzerland, the Netherlands, the United States, and countries in South America. Mauger has served as president of the Association des Trombonistes Français since 2012, and served as president of the International Trombone Association from 2020 to 2023.

== Discography ==
- Latitudes Trombone - J.C.M.A. 07
- Trombone, Brass Band - 43RI02
- Showcase for Trombone - JCMA Production: jcmasarl@wanadoo.fr
- Virtuoso trombone - KICC 109
- Super Sonic trombone - KICC 191
- Great Trombone concertos - Indésens INDE079
- Trombone Méditation - Indésens INDE029
- Jacques Mauger & Friends - Tutti Records TUTT002
- Baroque Trombone Concerti - Tutti Records TUT005
- Special Trombone et Strombor Brass Quintet - JCMA Production: jcmasarl@wanadoo.fr
- Tour de Slide with Irvin Wagner Oklahoma Trombone Choir
- Tbon & Jacques (Ferran Ferrer, Jean-Michel Defaye, Daniel Bimbi Musique militaire Gran-Ducale) - Indésens INDE116
- Sixty Years of Trombone (Bernsteinn, legrand, Moussorgski) - Indésens INDE140
