= Ferdinand David (musician) =

German violinist and composer (1810–1873)

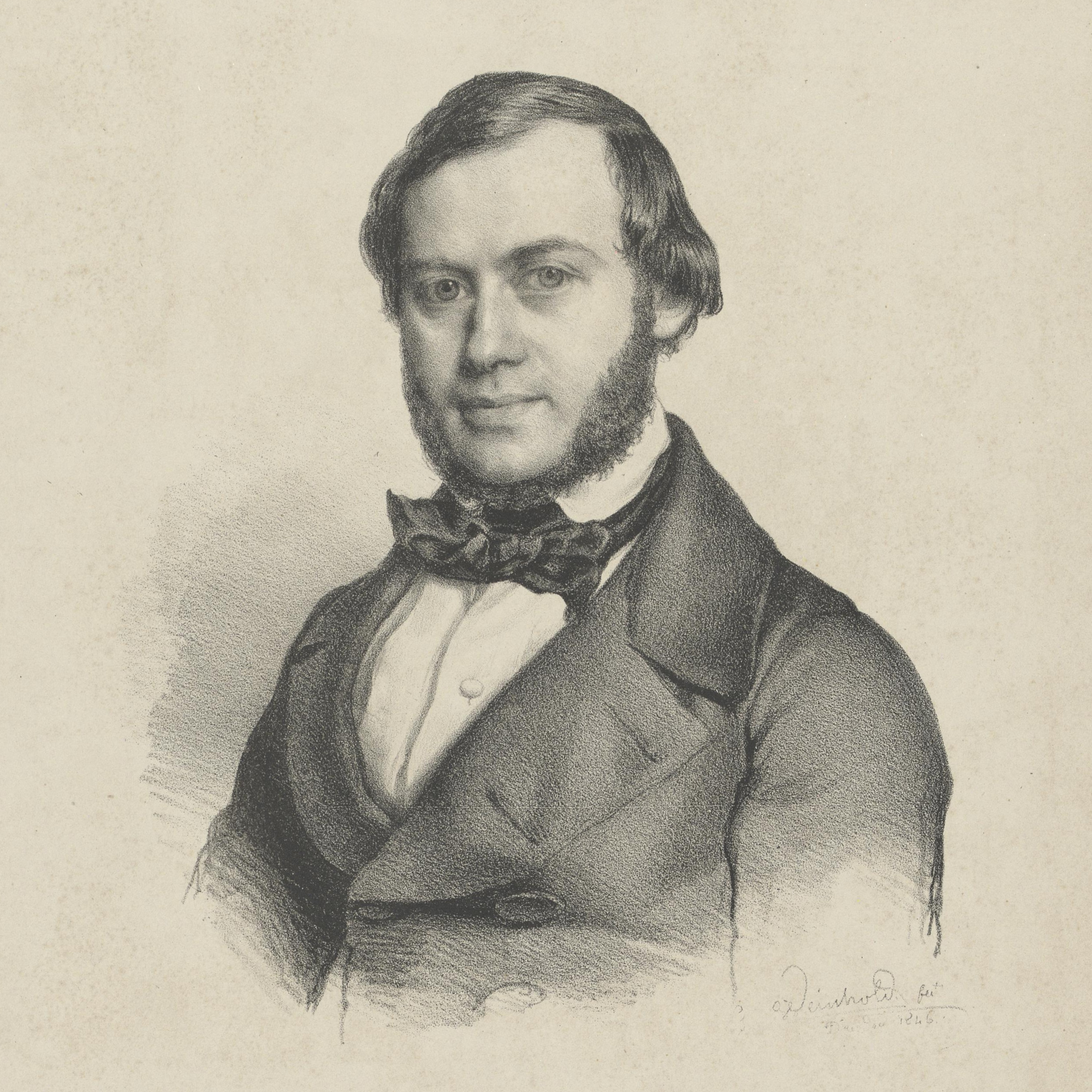
Ferdinand David

Ferdinand Ernst Victor Carl David (German: [ˈdaːvɪt]; 19 June 1810 – 18 July 1873) was a German virtuoso violinist, composer and conductor.

== Biography ==
Born in the same house in Hamburg where Felix Mendelssohn had been born the previous year, David was raised Jewish but later converted to Protestant Christianity. His sister Louise Dulcken was a concert pianist. David was a pupil of Louis Spohr and Moritz Hauptmann from 1823 to 1824 and in 1826 became a violinist at Königsstädtisches Theater in Berlin. In 1829 he was the first violinist of the string quartet of Baron Carl Gotthard von Liphart (father of Karl Eduard von Liphart) in Dorpat, and he undertook concert tours in Riga, Saint Petersburg and Moscow. In 1835 he became concertmaster (Konzertmeister) at the Gewandhaus in Leipzig working with Mendelssohn. In Leipzig, for about forty years, he was also the first violinist of the Leipzig Quartet. David returned to Dorpat to marry Liphardt's daughter Sophie. In 1843 David became the first professor of violin (Violinlehrer) at the newly founded Leipziger Konservatorium für Musik. David worked closely with Mendelssohn, providing technical advice during the preparation of the latter's Violin Concerto in E minor. He was also the soloist in the premiere of the work in 1845, and, with Clara Schumann, played the official premiere of Schumann's first violin sonata in Leipzig in March 1852.

After Mendelssohn's sudden death, David was assigned Kapellmeister of the Gewandhaus Orchestra, a duty he fulfilled 1841–1842 and 1852–1854. He died suddenly in 1873, aged 63, while on a mountain excursion with his children, near Klosters in the Graubünden (Grisons) area of Switzerland.

== Compositions ==
David's own compositions number about 50 opuses. They include 12 "theme and variations" pieces for violin and orchestra, five violin concertos, a string sextet, concertinos for violin, bassoon, clarinet, trombone and orchestra, and a number of lieder. Supposedly he also wrote two symphonies and an opera (Hans Wacht, 1852), but these seem not to have been preserved.

David's most played piece today is his Concertino for Trombone and Orchestra, Op. 4. The first movement of this piece is very often used as the obligatory piece for tenor trombonists auditioning for symphony orchestras around the world.

== Editions and arrangements ==
David had close connections with Breitkopf & Härtel and other publishers in Leipzig, and also worked as editor of violin works including those of Francesco Maria Veracini, Pietro Locatelli and Johann Gottlieb Goldberg. He was editor of the complete Beethoven piano trios for C.F. Peters Edition. He was also editor of the set of J.S. Bach's Sonatas and Partitas for solo violin in 1843.

He made an arrangement for violin and piano of Niccolò Paganini's 24 Caprices for Solo Violin, which was the version used for the world premiere integral recording of the Caprices, by Ossy Renardy and Walter Robert in 1940, the centenary of Paganini's death; this was seven years before Ruggiero Ricci made the first recording of the original solo violin version. When Renardy re-recorded the Caprices in 1953, he again used David's arrangement.

The Chaconne in G minor attributed to Tomaso Antonio Vitali was published for the first time from a manuscript in the Sächsische Landesbibliothek in Dresden in David's well renowned violin-method Die Hohe Schule des Violinspiels (1867). He also wrote an often-used version of the cadenza for Beethoven's violin concerto, used by 12-year old Joseph Joachim at the revival concert of this piece in 1844, under Mendelssohn.

== Other ==
On the recommendation of William Sterndale Bennett, with whom he had worked in Leipzig, David's son Paul David became the first Director of Music at Uppingham School from 1864–1908.

In 1835, the year that Mendelssohn was assigned Kapellmeister of the Gewandhaus Orchestra, there was an audition for the Konzertmeister position. One of the other applicants was Karol Lipiński, the Polish virtuoso. Most probably, the childhood connection between David and Mendelssohn played a part in Mendelssohn choosing David as the Konzertmeister.
