= Es ist ein Ros entsprungen (Sandström) =

- Choral composition by Jan Sandström
- Key: F major
- Based on: Es ist ein Ros entsprungen by Michael Praetorius
- Composed: 1990
- Scoring: two mixed choirs

Es ist ein Ros entsprungen (Det är en ros utsprungen, Lo, How a Rose E'er Blooming) is the setting of the Christmas carol Es ist ein Ros entsprungen for two choirs a cappella by Swedish composer Jan Sandström. The work of 1990, which incorporates the harmonization by Praetorius, is one of his signature compositions, along with his Trombone Concerto No. 1, the Motorbike Concerto.

== Composition ==
Jan Sandström composed the work in 1990, one year after the success of his Motorbike Concerto. He took the four-part setting of the Christmas carol Es ist ein Ros entsprungen by Michael Praetorius (1609) as a starting point. Line by line, he placed it in slow motion within an eight-part a cappella setting. Choir I in four parts, singing Praetorius, can be performed by soloists. Choir II in eight parts is hummed throughout. The way of combining a chorale as a cantus firmus with different musical material is similar to chorale preludes, but in this case the cantus firmus is quoted not only in the melody but a full harmonization, and the contrasting music is given to voices. Their humming renders the work suitable for international presentation.

The work was first published in 1995 by the Sveriges Körförbunds Förlag, Stockholm. It is available as a single copy or in the collection Cantemus 3. It is published for the U.S. by Walton Music as "Lo, How a Rose E'er Blooming / Es ist ein Ros entsprungen".

It is written in F major in common time with a tempo indication of ♩=56, which is especially slow since Sandström has changed the note grades so that this is equivalent to ♩=28 in Praetorius's notation and he uses mainly the longest notes. The voices of choir II enter one after the other within four measures, from the lowest to the highest, starting ppp and gradually increasing to piano. All voices but bass II, which stays on its first note F, move upwards from their first note to a second on which they stay, building up a chord into which choir I enters in measure 5, also ppp to piano and back again on the words "Es ist ein Ros entsprungen". The chords in choir II change subtly by voices moving or pausing, carefully supporting the harmonies of Praetorius. Choir II is singing alone for more than a measure before choir I continues "aus einer Wurzel zart".

== Selected performances and recordings ==
The composition is a highlight of Christmas programs by ambitious choirs and vocal ensembles. In 2007 it was included in a broadcast from Kings College Chapel on Christmas Eve, with the Choir of King's College, conducted by Stephen Cleobury. Chanticleer performed it in 2007 and then commissioned the composer to write a piece for them for the Christmas season of 2010, which resulted in The Word Became Flesh. In 2010 it was broadcast twice by the BBC in a Choral Evensong from Winchester College. New England Conservatory's Chamber Singers and Concert Choir included the composition in their 2011 Lessons and Carols program. It is on the 2011 Christmas program of the NDR Chor in St. Nikolai.

In 2002, the chamber choir Dresdner Kammerchor, conducted by Hans-Christoph Rademann, included it on their CD Weihnachten, and it was described in a review as an "absolutely otherworldly setting ... Praetorius meets Ligeti". Performed by the Dale Warland Singers, the composition is part of a 2005 CD Noel – A Music Feast, a charitable project which also features "Carol of the Bells" and "Hallelujah" from Messiah, sung by the Westminster Choir. In 2009, a CD titled Es ist ein Ros' entsprungen – Christmas Music for Choir and Organ combined several settings of the tune, the original by Praetorius, an organ prelude by Johannes Brahms (Op. 122 No. 8), variations on it by Hugo Distler from Die Weihnachtsgeschichte (The Christmas Story, 1933) and Sandström's setting, together with related Christmas music, performed by Vox Bona, the chamber choir of the Kreuzkirche, Bonn, conducted by Karin Freist-Wissing. Reviewer Dan Morgan commented on Sandström's work: "From its dark, monastic beginning rising to a radiant, multi-layered crescendo, this is the disc's crowning glory. ... It's an extraordinary fusion of old and new, a minor masterpiece that deserves the widest possible audience." Stefan Schmöe compared the "schwebende Klangflächen" (floating soundscapes) of the added second chorus to an acoustic halo. John Miller describes Sandström's addition as a "timeless, atmospheric, dream-like sound-scape of poignantly dissonant polyphonic strands".

In 2011, Es ist ein Ros entsprungen was recorded by the TOWER Voices New Zealand for their CD A Voices Christmas. The Crypt Choir of The King's School, Canterbury included it on the program A Spotless Rose, recommended by the Royal School of Church Music. The Society of Swedish Composers selected it for its "Composer's Radio 2011" titled "Inspirations".

== See also ==
- List of Christmas carols
