= Fredrik Högberg =

Swedish composer and producer

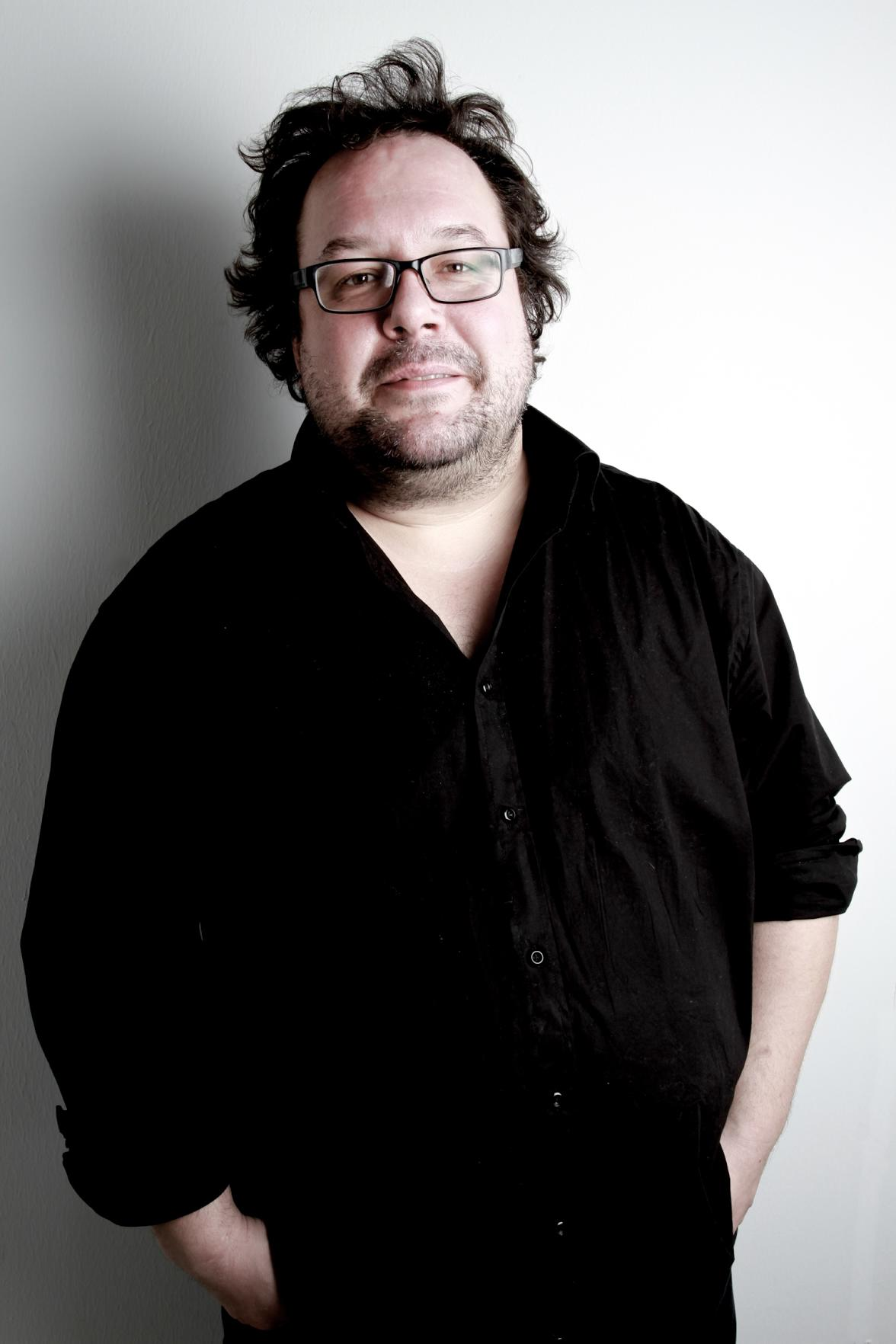
- Born: Fredrik Karl Kristian Högberg; February 5, 1971 (age 55); Vellinge, Sweden
- Occupation: Composer
- Era: Contemporary
- Website: Official website

Fredrik Karl Kristian Högberg, born 5 February 1971 in Vellinge, Sweden, is a Swedish composer and producer. He resides in the old courthouse in Nyland, Ångermanland (mid-Sweden).

Fredrik Högberg grew up in Svedala, southern Sweden, and studied at the Folk High School of Framnäs, Piteå 1987–1991. Högberg has studied composition mainly with professor Jan Sandström at Piteå School of Music (a part of Luleå University of Technology). He earned a licentiate degree in performing arts at Luleå University of Technology 2012. He teaches composition at Piteå School of Music since 2015.

== Life and career ==
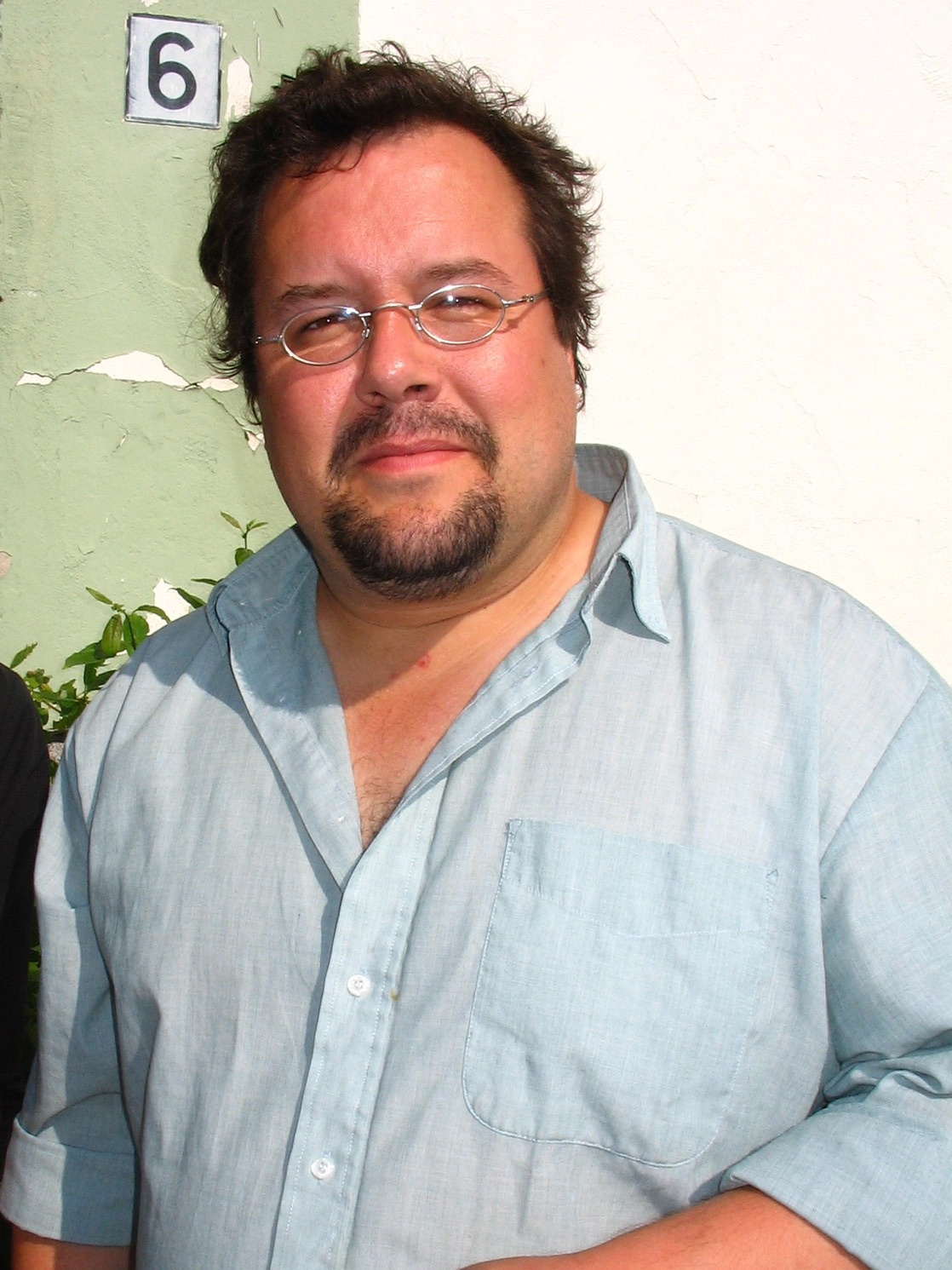

From the early 2000 Högberg has worked mainly with works that contains multimedia, like the music film Brassbones – a brass western (2001) and the concertos Ice Concerto (2012) and The Accordion King (2014).

Works like Dancing with Silent Purpose and Rocky Island Boat Bay are examples of Högberg's humorous approach to his musical creation, and his inclination to combine contemporary art music with elements of popular music.

Högberg's work is sometimes controversial; while working with the Ice Concerto Högberg shot burning pianos being dropped from 40 metres onto the ice of Ångermanälven. He was charged with environmental crimes, which were later dropped. 2016 he wrote the music (in collaboration with singer/songwriter Nicolai Dunger) for the critically acclaimed opera Stilla min eld, inspired by the circumstances of Eva Rausings death in Belgravia, London, 2012.

Högberg can be said to have embraced the instrumental theatre of the 1960s in many of his works, for example Subadobe (1992/1994), for trombone, and Baboon Concerto (2018), for bassoon and orchestra.

Fredrik Högberg has collaborated with soloists as, among others, Christian Lindberg, Anders Paulsson, Jörgen Sundeqvist, Niklas Sivelöv, Øystein Baadsvik, Ole Edvard Antonsen and Martin Fröst, and many international orchestras and ensembles which has led to several acclaimed works.

Högberg's production is published by Gehrman's musikförlag, Stockholm. His trombone music is published by Edition Tarrodi.

=== Awards ===
Högberg has won numerous awards and stipends. In 2006 he received one of the biggest grant to-date given to a Swedish composer, €200,000, to develop the first virtual opera house on the internet – iOPERA. In 2014 his piano concerto Ice Concerto was nominated to the Nordic Council Music Award.

== List of works ==
=== Solo Instrument ===
- Subadobe 1-4 – four pieces for solo trombone, 1992/94
- Subadobe 5 – solo trombone & backstage trombone, 1994
- Erotikmusik – for piano, 1995
- Cloud Balloon – for Clarinet in Bb, 1996
- Flight of the Dragonfly – for flute, 1996
- Malin the Worker's Waltz – for accordion, 2014
- Krom – for alto flute, 2017

=== Chamber music ===
- Danser från Helikons källor (Dances from the sources of Helicon) – for brass quintet, 1995/2002
- Hubbeli-Bubbeli – for brass quintet, 1995
- John & Clint – for trombone och bass trombone, 1995
- Pulsmusikk – for optional Bb- or C-instrument and drumkit, 1997
- The Ballad of Kit Bones – western drama for trombone sextet, 1998
- The Bubble Tune – for accordion and organ, 1998/2003
- Kroum Song – for percussion ensemble, 1998
- Melancholy Tango – for brass quintet, 2000
- Play 'em High – western drama för trombone sextet and narrator, 2002 (Fredrik Högberg & Christian Lindberg)
- Déjà Vu – for clarinet, trombone, percussion, vibraphone, double bass and piano, 2004
- Dancing According To Me – for two accordion, 2006
- More is More – for string quartet, 2006

=== Tape/multimedia ===
- Movements of Infinity "Akvariekonserten" – tape & livehydrofoni, 1992 (Fredrik Högberg & Niklas Breman)
- Minds 'n Pictures – tape, video & soloists, 1993
- Tiden snöar från trädet (Time snows from the tree) – tape, 1994
- Sensualle – film music, 1995
- Plastmusikk – for optional instrument in C or Bb, backtrack and optional percussion, 1995
- Popmusikk – for optional Bb- or C-instrument and backtrack, 1996/99
- Visible Duet – for soprano, optional Bb- or C-instrument och backtrack, 2003
- Bogo Bogo – for oboe (or optional Bb- or C-instrument) and tape, 2004
- Ice Piano (Ice Breaker) – two pieces for piano and backtrack, 2010

=== Film ===
- Brassbones – a brass western (2001) – composer, co-director
- The adventures of Kundraan – a symphonic tale in three parts based on the life and music of Christian Lindberg, 2017 (post production director & creative editor)

=== Works for orchestra ===
==== Concertos ====
- Head Concerto – for trombone and symphonic wind orchestra, 1995
- Concerto for Soprano Saxophone and Orchestra, 1998
- Concertino for Soprano Saxophone and String orchestra, 2000
- The Return of Kit Bones – Trombone concerto no. 1, 2001
- The Poem – Concerto for trumpet and orchestra, 2004–05
- Trolltuba – Concerto for tuba and symphonic wind orchestra, 2005
- Rocky Island Boat Bay – Concerto for tuba and orchestra 2006
- Hitting the First Base – Concerto for double bass and string orchestra, 2008
- Konzert für zwei Posaunen – for two trombones and chamber orchestra, 2008/2012
- Silent Purpose – Concerto for clarinet, string orchestra, backtrack and optional video projections, 2008
- Dancing with Silent Purpose – Concerto for clarinet, string orchestra and backtrack, 2010
- Ice Concerto – for piano, orchestra, backtrack and video projection, 2012
- The Accordion King – Concerto for accordion, orchestra and video projection, 2014
- Absent Illusions – Concerto for violin, orchestra and video projection, 2017
- Baboon Concerto – Concerto for bassoon and orchestra, 2018

==== Orchestra ====
- Chords 'n Anger – for orchestra, 1993
- Strings & Sadness – for string orchestra/quintet, 1993
- Little Suite for Orchestra (dedicated to Winnie the Poh), 1993/94
- Music for Strings – for string orchestra, 1998
- Tre gnostiska danser (Three gnostic dances) – for orchestra, 1999/2000
- The Latin Kings & Orchestra, 2000 (Fredrik Högberg; lyrics: Dogge Doggelito)

=== Ballet music ===
- Higgins & Mr. Wrengengengengeng – a music tale/ballet for narrator and orchestra, 1993/2005
- Subtrain Eroticism – for chamber orchestra, 1994–95
- Subtrain Eroticism II – tape, percussion & trombone, 1996–97
- In-Vita – tape & four singers, 1997
- Excavating Ascent – tape, 1999
- Standing Waves – for orchestra, 1999
- Slice of Time – for percussion ensemble, 2003

=== Vocal music ===
==== Choir ====
- Erotica – mixed choir, 1992
- Chuang-tse och fjärilen (Chuang-tse and the butterfly) – chamber ensemble, choir & soprano, 1994
- Jag är rädd, andas på mig (I am afraid, breathe on me) – choir & tape, 1995
- Barents Hymn – choir & wind orchestra, 1998
- Svenskt Mantra (Swedish Mantra) – choir & tape, 2002
- The Fisherman – for 16-part vocal ensemble, 2014

==== Vocals and chamber ensemble ====
- Melodram – for baritone and saxophone quartet, 2013
- Sagan om Vintern (A Winter Tale) – music tale for chamber ensemble & singers, 1997

==== Choir and orchestra ====
- Älvdans och himlasång (River dances and heavenly singing) – Music inspired by old folk tradition for choir, organ and orchestra, 2000

==== Opera ====
- Woman of Cain – A tale of a family in the dawn of civilization. Opera for soloists, choir and orchestra, 2001/2009 (libretto: Tove Alsterdal)
- Stilla min eld (Still my fire) – Opera about Hans Kristian Rausing and Eva Rausing, 2016 (libretto: Alexander Onofri & Kerstin Gezelius)

==== Vocals and orchestra ====
- Suite from The Woman of Cain – for soprano, baritone and orchestra, 2008 (lyrics: Tove Alsterdal)
