= Swedish Wind Ensemble =

Swedish wind orchestra

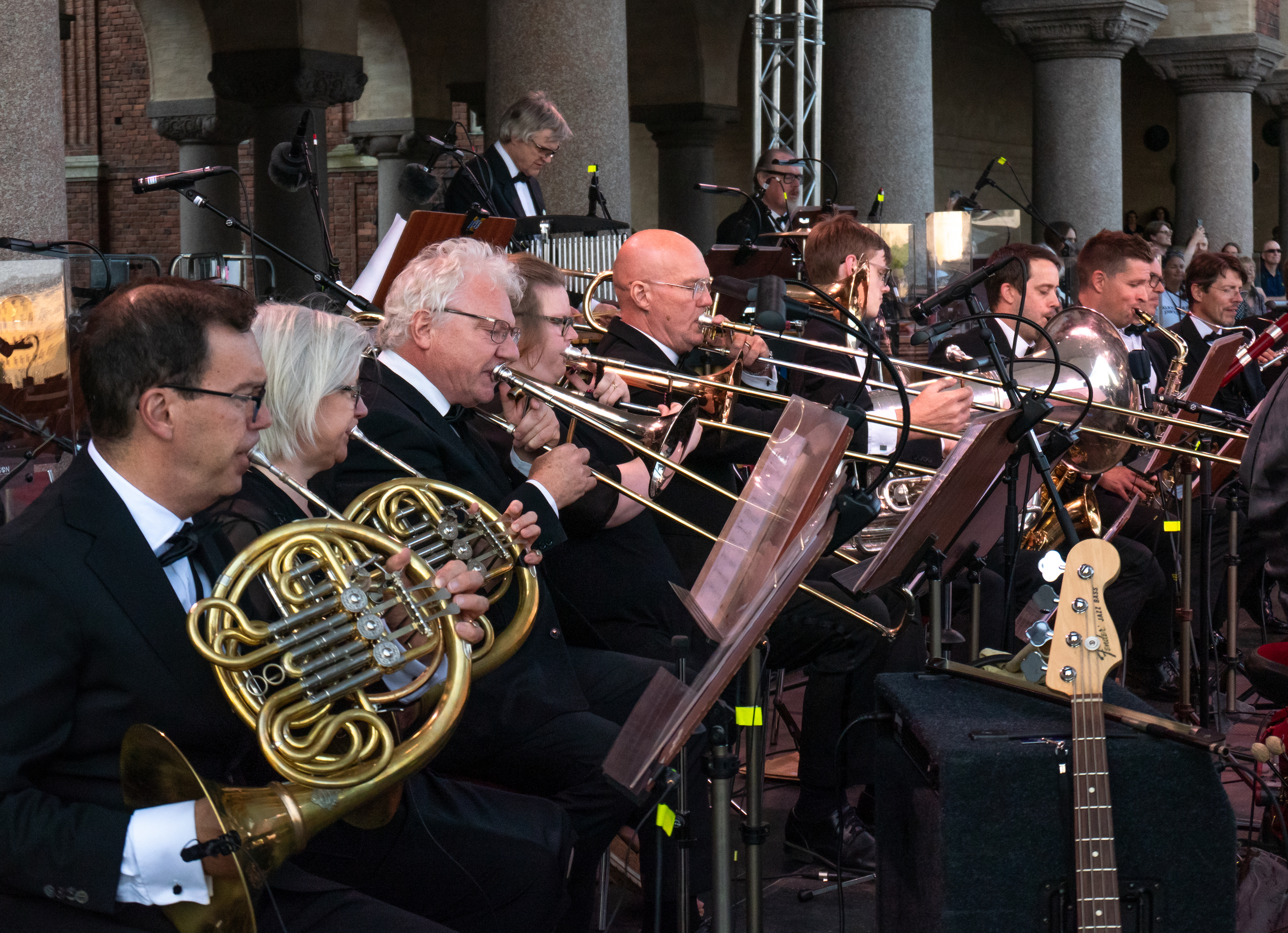
The Swedish Wind Ensemble during Stockholm City Hall's 100th anniversary in 2023

The Swedish Wind Ensemble (Swedish: Blåsarsymfonikerna) is a Swedish wind orchestra. The orchestra was founded in 1906 under the name Stockholms Spårvägsmäns Musikkår as a sextet and was initially under the direction of Stockholms Spårväg. The Wind Symphony is today part of the Stockholm County Music Department and has the Musikaliska as its home venue. The artistic director and chief conductor is Cathrine Winnes, who succeeded Christian Lindberg in 2016.

The orchestra celebrated its 100th anniversary in 2006, including a tour abroad. Other major concerts include the annual Stockholm Lucia Concert with Adolf Fredrik's music classes and Stockholm Music High School, and the annual performance of Carl Orff's "Carmina Burana".
