= Hans-Ola Ericsson =

Swedish musician (born 1958)

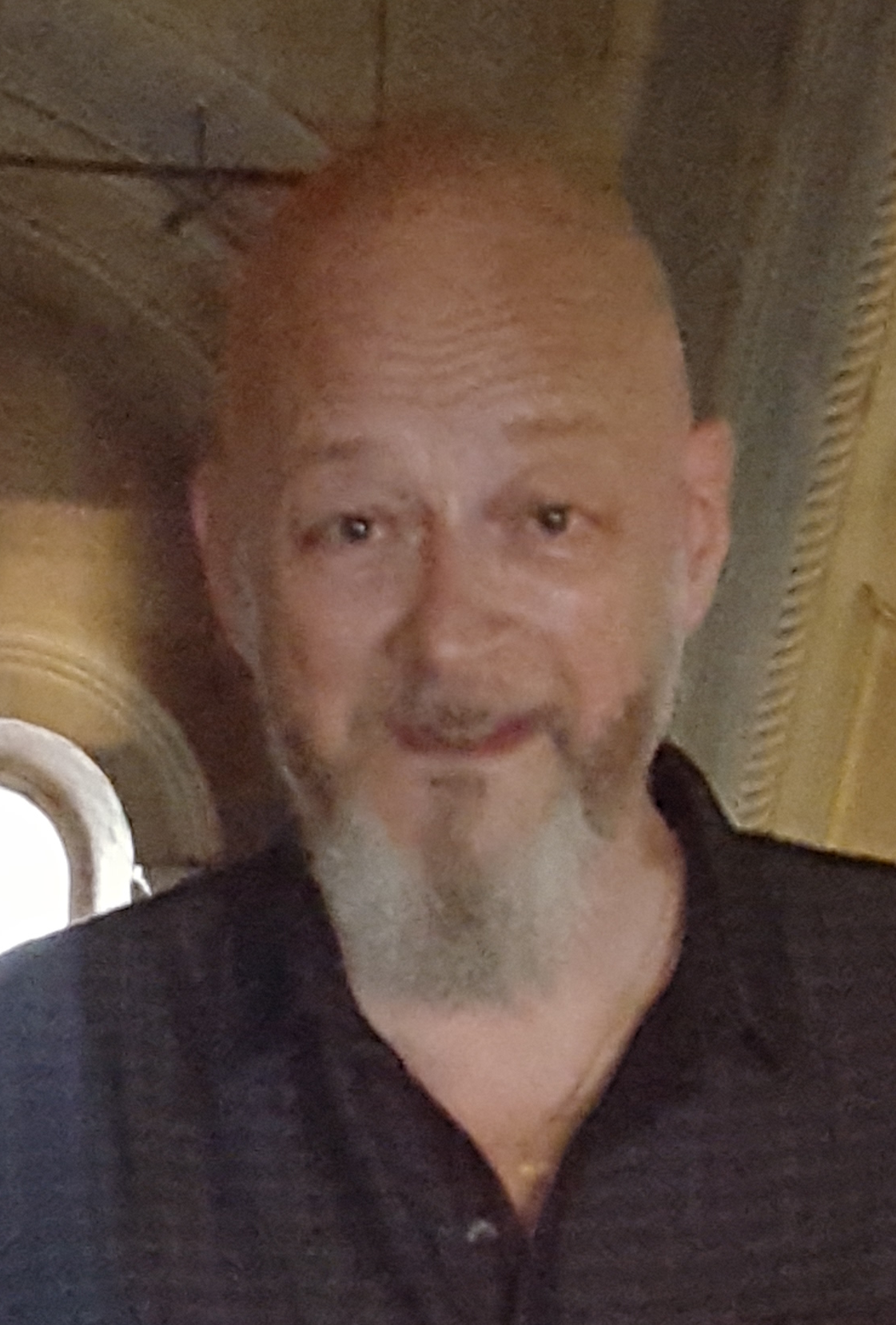
Hans-Ola Ericsson, 2017

Hans-Ola Ericsson (born 1958 in Stockholm) is a Swedish organist, composer, pedagogue, and visual artist.

== Career ==
Ericsson studied church music at the Royal College of Music in Stockholm, and continued his organ and composition studies at the Hochschule für Musik Freiburg in Germany (with Zsigmond Szathmáry, Edith Picht-Axenfeld, Klaus Huber, and Brian Ferneyhough). He also studied privately with Luigi Nono and Olivier Messiaen.

In 1988, Ericsson was appointed professor of organ performance at the Piteå School of Music, a department of the Luleå University of Technology in Piteå. In 1990, he was lecturer at the summer course for new music in Darmstadt and was awarded the prestigious Kranichsteiner Musikpreis. In 1996 Hans-Ola Ericsson was appointed permanent guest professor at the Hochschule für Künste in Bremen, Germany. In the spring of 2000 he was named a member of the Royal Swedish Academy of Music and he received the Swedish Society of Composers interpretation prize in 1999. He was Principal Guest Organist of the Lahti Organ Festival in Finland from 2002 until 2006. Since 2005, he is artistic consultant for the Bodø International Organ Festival in Norway. From 2011 until his retirement in 2020, he was professor of organ at the McGill University’s Schulich School of Music in Montréal, Canada.

Ericsson has given concerts throughout Europe as well as in Japan and the USA and Canada. He is probably most known for his interpretations of contemporary organ literature, and a notable interpreter of the music of Messiaen. He has made numerous recordings including a highly acclaimed complete recording of Messiaen's organ music, being awarded the Swedish Gramophone Prize annually between 1985 and 1988.

Hans-Ola Ericsson is also engaged in organ-restoration projects as well as holding courses in Europe and the USA. He served as the project leader of the "Övertorneå-project", an exhaustive documentation, reconstruction and restoration of the most important instrument of the Swedish Baroque, the organ of the German Church in Stockholm. He has also led the work with the Woehl-built organ in Studio Acusticum concert hall, Piteå. He has held guest professorships in Riga, Copenhagen, Helsinki and Amsterdam, as well as lectured and performed at a large number of leading organ festivals and academic symposia worldwide, persistently campaigning for the quality of new music and its right to be heard.

Since the COVID pandemic 2020, Ericsson is also working as a visual artist.

Harald Vogel writes the following about Hans-Ola Ericsson:

"Hans-Ola Ericsson is one of the exceptional figures on the international music scene, distinguishing himself both as performer and composer. He excels in a wide range of styles, from early to contemporary music, always looking to infuse his playing with historically informed practices. No other organist in the last decade has played as many contemporary work premieres as Ericsson; he has worked closely with John Cage, György Ligeti and Olivier Messiaen to better understand their artistic visions. As a post-avant-garde composer, Hans-Ola Ericsson blends existing sound material with the unheard in his works. This technique can be observed in Ericsson’s organ mass, relating the sounds of Arp Schnitger organs. He was referred to as the prototypical organist of the 21st century, his music displaying a versatility focused on every sound and on its compositional context."

In 1989, Hans-Ola Ericsson was appointed professor at the Academy of Music in Piteå and at the University of Luleå. In 1996, he was appointed visiting professor at the University of the Arts Bremen and in 2011, professor of organ at the Schulich School of Music at McGill University in Montreal, Canada. Today, he is in high demand as a concert organist, a composer, a teacher and a consultant for organ restoration work. He has worked namely to restore an organ dating back to the 17th century sitting in the German Church in Stockholm. His interpretations are well documented on numerous recordings, including the recording of Olivier Messiaen’s complete organ works.

== Compositional style ==
Ericsson's earlier works were closer in style to those of Klaus Huber or Luigi Nono, but this compositional approach became restrictive, and Ericsson went through a period of compositional silence in between 1984/85 and 1999. Ericsson's more recent music draws more freely from various styles, and concentrates, to a certain extent, on musical timbre and space, as well as referential ideas in music. For example, his work "The Four Beast' Amen", for organ and electronics, begins with the organ in dialogue with recordings of organs from Hamburg, Stade, Norden, Cappel and Lüdingworth. The style refers to older organ works, such as those of Frescobaldi or Buxtehude, but with all of the organs overlapping in such a way that everything is blurry. The second movement changes completely in style, concentrating on sounds created by the wind chest of the organ. Some of the later movements of this work focus on differences in tuning between some of the organs that we heard in the beginning.

== Works ==
- Musik för en sjuk värld (Niemandsland II) (Music for a Sick World) for solo viola and chamber orchestra (1980–1981)
- "... and all that remains is silence ..." for choir (1984)
- Melody to the Memory of a Lost Friend for organ and electronics (1985)
- The Four Beasts' Amen for organ and electronics (1999–2000)
- Canzon del Principe - An intabulation on an intabulation for organ and electronics (2002)

== Recordings ==
Hans-Ola Ericsson has made numerous recordings including a highly acclaimed complete recording of Olivier Messiaen´s organ music. In 1999 the influential German magazine Die Zeit named this complete recording one of the 111 most important recordings for the next millennium (http://www.zeit.de/1999/01/111_Platten_fuer_das_naechste_Jahrtausend). Music from the 20th Century has been in focus for Ericsson’s recordings, mostly on the Scandinavian label BIS, however also recordings of organ and chamber music from the romantic and the baroque era have been very well received.

Sheng (Malmö Audioproduktion MAP R 8606) Together with Helén Jahren, oboe. B Hambraeus: Sheng J Johansson: Einige Veränderungen II R Martinsson: Lontano

Organo con forza (Phono Suecia PS CD 31, double CD) H-O Ericsson: Melody to the Memory of a Lost Friend XIII, for organ and tape (1985) S Hanson: "Es ist genug..." (1985) G Ligeti: Etude no 1, Harmonies (1967) R P Scott: Austreibung, for a singing organist (1979/80, rev 1982) Lützow-Holm: L’ieu d’ad Orgue, for organ and tape (1979/80 and 1985) J W Morthenson: Encores (1962, rev 1973) S-D Sandström: "Befria mig ur friheten! All denna frihet!" (1980) R P Scott: Songs for Dr G (1983, rev 1984-85 and -86) A Mellnäs: Disparitions (1971) D Feiler: Golá (1985) T Ungvary: Interactions no 2, for organ and tape (1970/79)

The complete organ music by Olivier Messiaen Vol 1 - 6

Vol 1: L’Ascension (1934); Le Banquet Céleste (1926/28); Apparition de l’Eglise Éternelle (1932); Diptyque (1930). (BIS-CD 409)

Vol 2: La Nativité du Seigneur (1935). (BIS-CD 410)

Vol 3: Messe de la Pentecôte; Livre d’orgue. (BIS-CD 441)

Vol 4: Les Corps glorieux; Verset pour la fête de la Dedicace. (BIS-CD 442)

Vol 5: Meditations sur le mystère de la Sainte Trinité. (BIS-CD 464)

Vol 6: Livre du Saint-Sacrement. (BIS-CD 491/492)

The Organ Music by Arnold Schönberg and György Ligeti (BIS-CD 509).

A Schönberg: Variations on a theme A Scönberg: Rezitativ G Ligeti: Harmonies G Ligeti Coulees G Frescobaldi G Ligeti: Hommaga a Frescobaldi

Organ Music from the U.S.A. ( BIS-CD 510) C Ives: Variations on ’America’ for organ (1891) C Ives: ’Adeste Fidelis’ In an Organ Prelude (1897) A Copland: Preamble (For a Solemn Occasion) A Copland: Episode M Feldman: Principal Sound J Cage: Some of ’The Harmony of Maine

20th Century Music for Trumpet and Organ (BIS-CD 565) Hans-Ola Ericsson, organ and Anthony Plog, trumpet. 1. P Eben: Okna (1980) 2. A Plog: Four Themes on Paintings of Edward Munch (1990) 3. A Hovhannes: Prayer of St Gregory, Op 62b (1946) 4. V Persichetti: The Hollow Men (1944) 5. A Jolivet: Arioso barocco (1968) 6. D Lowry: Suburban Measures (1991)

Baltic Organ Music (BIS-CD 561) A Pärt: Annum per annum M K Ciurlionis: Fugue in C sharp minor M K Ciurlionis: Chorale Fugue in A minor on ’Aus tiefer Not schrei ich zu dir’ P Süda: Prelude and Fugue in G minor I Zemzaris: Pastorales for Summer Flute P Vasks: Te Deum B Kutavicius: Sonata ’Ad Patres’

The Complete Organ Music by Beethoven and the Complete Works for a Musical Clock by Haydn (BIS-CD 609)

Kalevi Aho: Symphony no 8 (BIS-CD 646) Hans-Ola Ericsson, Organ, Lahti Symphony Orchestra, Osmo Vänskä, Conductor.

C P E Bach: The Complete Sonatas for Flute and Obbligato Keyboard (BIS-CD 755/756) Together with Lena Weman, Baroque Flute.

Royal Music for a Royal Instrument (BIS CD 1103) . Andreas Düben: Praeludium Pedaliter; Wo Gott der Herr nicht bei uns hält. Melchior Schildt: Gleichwie das Feuer; Paduana Lachrymae. Gustav Düben: [Suite]: Praeludium; Allemande; Courante; Sarabande. Andreas Düben/Martin Düben: Allein Gott in der Höh sei Ehr. Martin Düben: Praeludium; Erstanden ist der heilig Christ; Praeludium Pedaliter. Anonymous: Frantzösches Liedelein Ex. G. Johann Rudolph Radeck: Courant. Saraband Ex. A. Heinrich Scheidemann: Englische Mascarada oder Judentanz. (Gustav?) Düben: Nun lob, mein Seel, den Herren.

Symphonic Organ Music, Vol 1 (BIS CD 1101) Jean Sibelius: Intrada, Op.111a (1925); Surusoitto (Funeral Music), Op.111b (1931); Avaushymni (Opening Hymn) and Surumarssi (Marche funebre) (1927) from "Masonic Ritual Music", Op.113. Antonín Dvořák: Preludes and Fugues (1859). Alexander Glazunov: Prelude and Fugue in D major, Op.93 (1906–07); Prelude and Fugue in D minor, Op.98 (1914); Fantasy, Op.110 (1934-35).

Symphonic Organ Music Vol 2 (BIS-CD 1102) Ottorino Respighi: Preludio in re minore (1910); Preludio in la minore sopra un Corale di Bach "Ich hab mein Sach Gott heimgestellt"; Preludio in si bemolle minore sopra un Corale di Bach "In dich hab' ich gehoffet, Herr" Charles Gounod: Offertoire. Vincenzo Bellini: Organ Sonata in G major Bedrich Smetana: Sest Preludii pro varhany (Six Preludes for Organ) Sir Edward Elgar: Vesper Voluntaries, Op.14; Cantique, Op.3 No.1

Hans-Ola Ericsson - The Four Beasts´Amen (BIS-SACD 1486) The Four Beasts´ Amen. Mass for organ and electronics based on texts by Olov Hartman Melody to the Memory of a Lost Friend XIII, for organ and electronics Canzon del Principe. An intabulation on an intabulation for organ and electronics (Don Carlo Gesualdo) from Höga Visan (Song of Songs), a church opera (together with Susanne Rydén soprano and Tommy Björk, percussion) Flügeltüren, Vocalise

Bengt Hambraeus Apocalipsis cum figuris secundum Dürer 1498 (1987) Motetum Archangeli Michaelis (1967) (BIS-CD 1048) Olle Sköld, Bass Hans-Ola Ericsson, Organ Swedish Radio Choir Stefan Parkman, Conductor

Die Woehl-Orgel der Katharinenkirche zu Oppenheim (OBV CD001) Hans-Ola Ericsson spielt Werke von Johann Sebastian Bach, Dieterich Buxtehude, César Franck, Nicolas de Grigny, Oskar Lindberg und Torsten Nilsson. Anonymus: Batalha de 6. ton Dieterich Buxtehude: "Nun freut euch lieben Christen g’mein" Torsten Nilsson: Linguae tamquam ignis Nicolas de Grigny: Récit de tièrce en Taille Johann Sebastian Bach : Toccata in E Oskar Lindberg : Gammal fäbodspalm från Dalarna César Franck: Choral Nr 3, a-moll Johann Sebastian Bach/Virgil Fox: Komm, süsser Tod Anonymus: Batalla famossa

John Cage – Organ2/ASLSP (Organum Ogm 250085) As SLow aS Possible Christoph Bossert & Hans-Ola Ericsson, Organ

Joël-Francois Durand – La terre et le feu (mode 139) Les raisons des forces mouvantes Hans-Ola Ericsson, Organ

Messiaen — The Complete Music for Organ BIS-CD-1770/72 Including the posthumous works: Monodie Offrande au Saint Sacrement Prèlude

Ö Fahlström: "Animations", Concert for Organ and Big Band. (Phono Suecia PSCD 75) Hans-Ola Ericsson, Organ, Norrbotten Big Band, Örjan Fahlström, Conductor

Johann Sebastian Bach: Early Organ Works (EUCD 66, Euridice, Norway) Hans-Ola Ericsson, Organ

Johann Sebastian Bach: Complete Chorale Partitas (2 CD:s) (EUCD 67, Euridice, Norway) Hans-Ola Ericsson, Organ

Johann Sebastian Bach: Orgelbüchlein (2 CD:s) (EUCD 68, Euridice, Norway) Hans-Ola Ericsson, Organ

Johann Sebastian Bach: Trio Sonatas for organ in Chamber Ensemble Setting (EUCD 69, Euridice, Norway) Lena Weman, Flute and Viola da Gamba Anna Lindal, Violin Mikko Perkola, Viola da Gamba Hans-Ola Ericsson, Harpsichord and Organ

Johann Sebastian Bach: Complete Flute Sonatas (2 CD:s) (EUCD 70, Euridice, Norway) Lena Weman, Flute and Viola da Gamba Mikko Perkola, Viola da Gamba Hans-Ola Ericsson, Harpsichord and Organ

Johann Sebastian Bach: Late organ Works (2 CD:s) (EUCD 71, Euridice, Norway) Hans-Ola Ericsson, Organ

Johann Sebastian Bach: Dritter Teil der Clavierübung (2 CD:s) (EUCD 72, Euridice, Norway) Hans-Ola Ericsson, Organ

Johann Sebastian Bach: Musikalisches Opfer (EUCD 73, Euridice, Norway) Lena Weman, Flute and Viola da Gamba Anna Lindal, Violin Mikko Perkola, Viola da Gamba Hans-Ola Ericsson, Harpsichord and Organ

Laurentiusorgel, Frankfurt-Bergen-Enkheim Hans-Ola Ericsson plays works by: Bach, Messiaen, Olsson, Cage, Codex Robertsbridge, Steigleder, Mellnäs/Ericsson, Wagner/Liszt

Olivier Messiaen’s Complete Works for Organ (JADE) Hans-Ola Ericsson plays Livre du Saint-Sacrement.

Ericsson, Hans-Ola: Musik für Orgel und Tonband (Hochschule für Künste, Bremen) "De fyra varelsernas Amen" "Melody to the Memory of a Lost Friend XIII"

== Awards, memberships and artistically related positions ==
Member of the Swedish Royal Music Academy since 2000 Member of the Royal Skytteanska Samfundet, since 2008 Awarded Wine-knighthood 2009 in Oppenheim, Germany Member of ICSM (International Society for Contemporary Music) since 1984 Member of FST (The Swedish Composers Association) since 1984 Interpretation Prize of The Swedish Composers Association (1999) Karl Sczuka Price (1981) Kranichsteiner Musikpreis (1990) Artistic director of Piteå Kyrkoopera (Piteå Church opera) 1998-2005 Vice chairman Norrbottensmusiken (National music organization) 1994-1996. Member of the editorial board for Musik und Kirche, Germany 2004-2014.

== Consultant in Organ Building Projects ==
- Sibeliustalo (Sibelius concert Hall) - Lahtis, Finland (2007) 3 manuals/57 stops
- Tyska kyrkan (German church) - Stockholm, Sweden (2004) 3 manuals/35 stops, reconstruction, meantone tempered
- Jukkasjärvi Ice hotel - Kiruna, Sweden – organ built in ice (2004) 2 manuals/2 stops
- Mikaelskyrkan (Michaels church) – Åbo, Finland (2002) 3 manuals/52 stops
- Vist church - Linköping, Sweden (2001) 2 manuals/22 stops
- Övertorneå church, Sweden (1609/1999) restoration 2 manuals/25 stops
- Vreta kloster – Linköping, Sweden (1998) 2 manuals/17stops
- Jukkasjärvi church – Kiruna, Sweden (1997) 2 manuals/15 stops
- Norrfjärdens church – Piteå, Sweden (1996) 3 manuals/35 stops, reconstruction, meantone tempered
- Umeå landsförsamling – Umeå, Sweden (1996) 2 manuals/33 stops
- Örnästets cemetery – Luleå, Sweden (1996) 2 manuals/15 stops
- Nybro church – Nybro, Sweden (1994) 2 manuals/34 stops
- Björkskatakyrkan – Luleå, Sweden (1992) 2 manuals/15 stops
- Piteå School of Music – Piteå, Sweden (1989) 3 manuals/35 stops
- Studio Acusticum (Piteå School of music), Piteå Sweden (2013) 4 manuals/approx 200 stops
