= Christian Lindberg =

Swedish trombonist (born 1958)

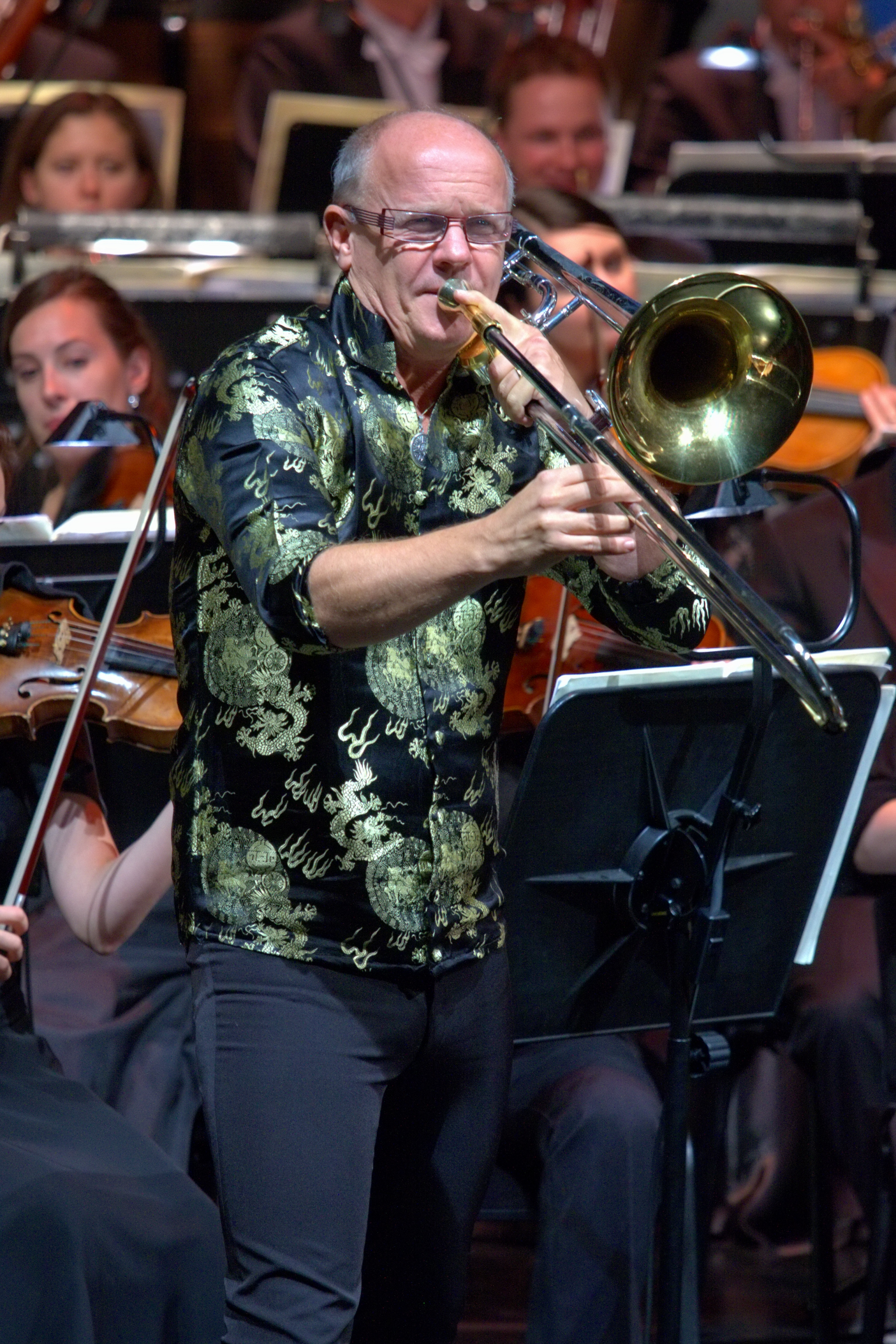
- Lindberg in Kraków, 2010

Background information
- Born: 15 February 1958 (age 68); Danderyd, Sweden
- Genre: Classical
- Occupations: Trombonist, conductor, composer
- Instrument: Trombone
- Years active: 1980–present
- Label: BIS Records
- Website: www.tarrodi.se/cl/

Christian Lindberg (born 15 February 1958) is a Swedish trombonist, conductor and composer.

== Biography ==
=== Early life and career ===
Lindberg was born in Danderyd. As a youth, he learned to play the trumpet, and subsequently began to learn the trombone at age 16. He originally borrowed a trombone to join his friends' Dixieland jazz group, inspired by records of Jack Teagarden. He attended the Royal Swedish Academy of Music, where his teachers included Sven-Erik Eriksson. By age 18, he had obtained a professional position in the Royal Swedish Opera Orchestra. At age 20, he left his orchestral career behind to study to become a full-time soloist. He studied with John Iveson at the Royal College of Music (1979–1980) and with Ralph Sauer and Roger Bobo in Los Angeles (1983).

=== Professional career ===
In 1981, Lindberg won the Nordic Soloists' Biennale competition. His concert debut was in 1984 with the Trombone Concerto by Henri Tomasi. That same year, he signed a 3-CD recording contract with BIS Records. His first solo recording was "The Virtuoso Trombone". Lindberg has recorded over 60 albums, for BIS and several other labels. His musical collaborators in Sweden have included pianist Roland Pöntinen and composer Jan Sandström.

Lindberg is noted for his performances of contemporary music, as well as expanding the repertoire of concerti for trombone. In 2006, he estimated that over the prior 25 years, composers wrote 82 works for him. On 7 September 2017, Lindberg gave his 100th trombone concerto premiere. Lindberg was the soloist in the premiere of Sandström's Motorbike Concerto. In addition to the Sandström, his repertoire includes Luciano Berio's Sequenza V, Fredrik Högberg's The Ballad of Kit Bones and Su ba do be.

Lindberg began to compose in the 1990s at the encouragement of Sandström. Lindberg's first-performed work was Arabenne for trombone and strings, recorded in 1997. Other compositions have included Mandrake in the Corner, Chick 'a' bone Checkout, from 2006 and written for Charles Vernon of the Chicago Symphony Orchestra, and Kundraan (2008).

Lindberg's patented trombone valve in default (A) and engaged (B) positions. Airflow 1. from mouthpiece, 2. to bell; 3. valve tubing; 4. valve casing; 5. internal rotor; 6. valve ports; 7. spindle.

Lindberg developed his own design of trombone F attachment valve rotor, which he patented in 1999 in collaboration with instrument manufacturer C.G. Conn. It features shallower curvature and only a 45° turn, for a more open-blowing valve register than a regular rotary valve. Conn produce a line of instruments built with this valve, which they market as the "CL2000".

In 2000, Lindberg made his conducting debut with the Northern Sinfonia in the UK. He has regularly conducted the Nordic Chamber Orchestra (chief conductor, 2004–2011) and the Swedish Wind Ensemble (2005–2012). He was principal conductor of the Arctic Philharmonic Orchestra, and was contracted to the orchestra until 2018. From 2016 to 2021, Lindberg was conductor and music director at the Israel Netanya Kibbutz Orchestra.

In 2011 Lindberg and the Norrköping Symphony Orchestra initiated the Allan Pettersson Project, the purpose of which is to record and issue all of Pettersson's symphonies on CD. The project was completed in 2023.

In 2019, Lindberg and Per Egland founded the recording label European Gramophone.

=== Personal life ===
Lindberg lives in Stockholm with his wife and four children. His daughter is composer Andrea Tarrodi. His elder brother is the lutenist Jakob Lindberg.

== Awards ==
- 1991 International Trombone Association Award
- 2004 Litteris et Artibus
- 2016 'Artist of the Year' at the International Classical Music Awards

== Discography ==
=== Recordings as trombonist ===
- The Virtuoso Trombone (BIS-258, 1984)
- The Romantic Trombone (BIS-298, 1985)
- The Burlesque Trombone (BIS-318, 1986)
- The Criminal Trombone (BIS-328, 1987)
- Romantic Trombone Concertos (BIS-378, 1988)
- The Solitary Trombone (BIS-388, 1988)
- The Winter Trombone (BIS-348, 1988)
- National Brass Band Championships Gala Concert 1990 (Heavyweight Records HR006, 1990)
- Trombone Odyssey (BIS-538, 1990)
- Lars-Erik Larsson: Twelve Concertinos, Op. 45 (BIS-473, 1991)
- Pär Lindgren: Fragments of a Circle (Phono Suecia PSCD 21, 1991)
- The Russian Trombone (BIS-478, 1991)
- The Sacred Trombone (BIS-488, 1991)
- Anders Hillborg: Clang & Fury (Phono Suecia PSCD 52, 1992)
- Trombone and Voice in the Habsburg Empire (BIS-548, 1992)
- 10 Year Jubilee (BIS-638, 1993)
- Aho: Symphony No.9; Cello Concerto (BIS-706, 1993)
- American Trombone Concertos (BIS-628, 1993)
- Paul Hindemith: Chamber Music (BIS-159, 1993)
- All the Lonely People (BIS-568, 1994)
- British Trombone Concertos (BIS-658, 1994)
- Folke Rabe: Basta (Phono Suecia PSCD 67, 1994)
- Hovhaness: Star Dawn (Delos DE 3158, 1994)
- Arabenne and other trombone concertos from the North (BIS-888, 1995)
- British Masters, Vol. 2 (Albany TROY093, 1995)
- Toru Takemitsu: Gémeaux; Dream Window; Spirit Garden (Denon CO-78944, 1995)
- American Trombone Concertos, Vol. 2 (BIS-788, 1996)
- Finn Arnestad: Chamber Interference (Aurora ACD 4987, 1996)
- Frank Martin: Vocal and Chamber Music (BIS-71, 1996)
- Hekas! (BIS-818, 1996)
- Songs for Sunset (BIS-808, 1996)
- Toru Takemitsu: Messages for the 21st Century, Vol. 4 (Deutsche Grammophon POCG-10053, 1996)
- Vagn Holmboe: Brass Concertos (BIS-802, 1996)
- Windpower (BIS-848, 1996)
- Lindberg Plays Sandström (BIS-828, 1997)
- Michael Nyman: Concertos (EMI 72435-564872-3, 1997)
- The Scandinavian Connection (Amstel 9701, 1997)
- Jan Sandström: Motorbike (Phono Suecia PSCD 87, 1998)
- Johan de Meij: Symphony No. 1 'The Lord Of The Rings'; T-Bone Concerto (World Wind Music WWM 500.034, 1998)
- Los Bandidos: The Criminal Trombone No. 2½ (BIS-988, 1998)
- Mozart: The Four Hornbone Concertos (BIS-1008, 1998)
- Unaccompanied (BIS-858, 1998)
- Bent Sørensen: Birds and Bells (ECM New Series 1665 465 135–2, 1999)
- Frank Martin: Concerto for 7 Wind Instruments; Ballades (Decca 444455, 1999)
  - re-released as Frank Martin: Concerto For Winds (Decca 4788352, 2015)
- Lindberg & Friends Play Lindberg (BIS-1148, 2000)
- Toru Takemitsu: How Slow The Wind (BIS-1078, 2001)
- Mandrake in the Corner (BIS-1128, 2002)
- Miklós Maros: Oolit (Caprice CAP 21670, 2002)
- Turnage: Fractured Lines (Chandos CHAN 10018, 2002)
- Classical Trombone Concertos (BIS-1248, 2004)
- Spanish Brass Luur Metalls: Absolute (Cascavelle VEL 3077, 2004)
- Christian Lindberg: A Composer's Portrait (BIS-1428, 2005)
- Christian Lindberg Plays Nathaniel Shilkret (BIS-1448, 2005)
- Hovhaness: The Rubaiyat (Delos DE 3352, 2005)
- Turnage: Scherzoid, Evening Songs, etc. (LPO 0007, 2005)
- Dedicated to Christian Lindberg (BIS-1638, 2007)
- Christian Lindberg: A Composers Portrait, Vol. 2 (BIS-1658, 2008)
- John Pickard: The Flight of Icarus; The Spindle of Necessity; Channel Firing (BIS-1578, 2008)
- Made in Sweden (Caprice CAP 21808, 2008)
- Takemitsu: Spirit Garden – Orchestral Works (Brilliant Classics 958469, 2008)
- The Baroque Trombone (BIS-1688, 2009)
- Stockholm Chamber Brass: Foliations (BIS-1438, 2009)
- The Swedish Radio Choir: Visions and Non Thoughts (Caprice CAP 21816, 2010)
- A Lindberg Extravaganza (BIS-1878, 2011)
- Ole Olsen: Symphony No. 1; Trombone Concerto; Asgaardsreien (BIS-1968, 2011)
- Trombone Fantasy (BIS-1888, 2011)
- Tangophoria (BIS-2108, 2014)
- Transformation (Genuin GEN 16431, 2016)

=== Recordings as conductor only ===
- Christian Lindberg Conducts the Swedish Wind Ensemble (BIS-1268, 2004)
- Nordic Spell – Concertos for Flute and Orchestra (BIS-1499, 2005)
- Nordic Showcase (BIS-1538, 2007)
- Ole Edvard Antonsen: Nordic Trumpet Concertos (BIS-1548, 2007)
- Øystein Baadsvik: Prelude, Fnugg and Riffs (BIS-1625, 2007)
- Allan Pettersson: Eight Barefoot Songs; Concertos Nos 1 & 2 for String Orchestra (BIS-1690, 2009)
- Allan Pettersson: Concerto No. 3 for String Orchestra (BIS-1590, 2010)
- Dvorák: Violin Concerto; Legends, Op. 59 (BIS-1708, 2010)
- Allan Pettersson: Symphonies Nos. 1 & 2 (BIS-1860, 2011)
- Christian Lindberg Conducts Jan Sandström (BIS-1748, 2011)
- Niels Marthinsen: Snapshot Symphony (DaCapo 8.226545, 2011)
- Allan Pettersson: Symphony No. 6 (BIS-1980, 2012)
- Brain Rubbish (BIS-1958, 2012)
- Allan Pettersson: Symphony No. 9 (BIS-2038, 2013)
- La Création du Monde (BIS-1640, 2013)
- Tchaikovsky: Symphony No. 5; Swan Lake Suite (BIS-2018, 2013)
- Allan Pettersson: Symphonies Nos. 4 & 16 (BIS-2110, 2014)
- Øystein Baadsvik plays Tuba Concertos (BIS-2005, 2014)
- Stenhammar: Serenade (BIS-2058, 2014)
- Allan Pettersson: Symphony No. 13 (BIS-2190, 2015)
- Tchaikovsky: Symphonies Nos. 4–6 (BIS-2178, 2016)
- Allan Pettersson: Symphony No. 14 (BIS-2230, 2017)
- Emil Jonason plays Lindberg and Golijov (BIS-2188, 2017)
- Allan Pettersson: Symphonies Nos. 5 & 7 (BIS-2240, 2018)
- Allan Pettersson: Violin Concerto No. 2 & Symphony No. 17 (fragment) (BIS-2290, 2019)
- Allan Pettersson: Symphony No. 12 'The Dead in the Square' (BIS-2450, 2021)
- Allan Pettersson: Symphony No. 15 & Viola Concerto (BIS-2480, 2022)
- Allan Pettersson: Symphonies Nos. 3 & 8 (BIS-2740, 2026)

== Notable concerto premieres ==
- Gunnar de Frumerie – Trombone Concerto (1987)
- Jan Sandström – Motorbike Concerto (1989)
- Iannis Xenakis – Troorkh (1991)
- Anders Hillborg – Trombone Concerto (1993)
- Toru Takemitsu – Fantasma / Cantos II
- Jan Sandström – Don Quixote (1994)
- Arvo Pärt – An den Wassern (1996)
- Dominic Muldowney – Trombone Concerto (1996)
- Pär Lindgren – Islands (1997)
- Michael Nyman – Trombone Concerto (1997)
- Luciano Berio – Solo for Trombone and Orchestra (1999)
- Anders Eliasson – Concerto per trombone (2000)
- Christian Lindberg – Helikon Wasp (2003)
- Mark Anthony Turnage – Yet Another Set To (2005)

Preceded by (no predecessor)	Principal Conductor, Arctic Philharmonic Orchestra; 2009–2018	Succeeded by Christian Kluxen
