= Charles Vernon =

American trombonist

Charles "Charlie" Gary Vernon is the bass trombonist for the Chicago Symphony Orchestra and serves as professor of trombone at DePaul University in Chicago, Illinois.

== Education ==
A native of Asheville, North Carolina, Vernon attended Brevard College and Georgia State University, where he studied with William "Bill" Hill and Gail Wilson. His principal teachers outside of university were bass trombonist Edward Kleinhammer and tubist Arnold Jacobs, both former members of the Chicago Symphony Orchestra. Vernon accredits much of his success to Kleinhammer and Jacobs in his book, The Singing Trombone.

== Previous positions ==
Vernon joined the CSO in 1986, coming from the Philadelphia Orchestra, where he had served since 1981. Prior to that, Vernon held identical posts with the Baltimore Symphony from 1971 to 1980 and the San Francisco Symphony from 1980 to 1981. Vernon is also a former faculty member of The Catholic University of America, Temple University, New School of Philadelphia, the Philadelphia College of Performing Arts (now University of the Arts (Philadelphia)), and the Curtis Institute of Music.

== Current ==
Vernon is a clinician for the Selmer Instrument Company and a frequent guest artist for the International Trombone Association, as well as the recipient of the 2021 ITA award. He has made numerous appearances as a soloist throughout the world. In April 1991, with the CSO under Daniel Barenboim, he gave the world premiere of Ellen Taaffe Zwilich's Concerto for Bass Trombone, which was commissioned by the CSO for its centennial. In 2006, Vernon and the CSO premiered "Chick 'a' Bone Checkout" a new concerto for alto, tenor and bass trombone and orchestra, written by trombonist and composer Christian Lindberg. In 2019, Vernon and the CSO under Riccardo Muti premiered Concerto for Bass Trombone by composer James Stephenson.

As a part-time athlete, Vernon is an avid swimmer and is a member of the Evanston Masters Swim Team. He states that "as time passes, I realize that I must keep doing it, so that I can keep doing it!"
