= Jan Sandström (composer) =

Swedish classical music composer (born 1954)

- Born: 25 January 1954 (age 72); Vilhelmina
- Education: Piteå School of Music; Royal College of Music, Stockholm
- Occupations: Composer; Academic teacher
- Organization: Piteå School of Music

Jan Sandström (born 25 January 1954) is a Swedish classical music composer. His compositions include the so-called Motorbike Concerto for trombone and orchestra and his choral setting of Es ist ein Ros entsprungen.

== Career ==
Born in Vilhelmina, Västerbotten County, Sandström grew up in Stockholm. He studied at the Luleå University of Technology's Piteå School of Music (1974–1976) and completed his music training at the Royal College of Music, Stockholm, studying music theory (1978–1982) and composition with Gunnar Bucht, Brian Ferneyhough and Pär Lindgren (1980–1984).

He joined the faculty of the Piteå School of Music in the 1980s and was appointed professor of composition in 1989.

In 1988 to 1989 he composed his first concerto for trombone and large orchestra, which became famous as the Motorbike Concerto, revised in 2002 to a Motorbike Odyssey. In 1990 he composed Es ist ein Ros entsprungen (Det är en ros utsprungen), placing the familiar Praetorius setting in slow motion in an eight-part a cappella setting.

In 1991 he completed Från Mörker till Ljus (From Darkness to Light) for reader, baritone and chamber orchestra, based on poems by Folke Isaksson, were inspired by an altarpiece from Antwerp in Gammelstad, with a focus on the Passion. The poems are partly spoken, partly sung, some accompanied by the orchestra; the tenth of 14 movements, Klarheten (Clarity), is purely orchestral. The work was recorded in 2002 with the singer of the premiere, Peter Mattei, speaker Sven Wollter and the Norrbotten Chamber Orchestra, conducted by Petter Sundkvist.

In 2008 his Rekviem (Requiem) on a Swedish text by Christine Falkenland was first performed at Stockholm's Hedvig Eleonora Church. A review summarised: "99% Pärt, 1% Bach".

In 2009 his ballet The Tale of a Manor was recorded on DVD by the Royal Swedish Ballet and the Swedish Radio Symphony Orchestra, conducted by Jonas Dominique.

In October 2013, a new choral work entitled Do what is fair was first performed in Uppsala Cathedral, as part of the Young Cathedral Voices festival. This new setting by Sandström of a text from Deuteronomy, for four choirs and four organs, was performed by choirs from Uppsala, Trondheim, Warsaw, Cologne, Llandaff, Riga and Solothurn.

== Selected works ==
=== Orchestra ===
==== Concertos ====
- A dance in the subdominant quagmire for soprano recorder and string orchestra, 1994
- Flute Concerto, 2008
- Clarinet Concerto, 2001
- My assam dragon, alto saxophone concerto, 1994 (for John-Edward Kelly)
- Trumpet Concerto No. 1, 1987 (for Håkan Hardenberger)
- Trumpet Concerto No. 2, 1993/96 (for Håkan Hardenberger)
- Trumpet Concerto No. 3, 2007 (for Ole Edvard Antonsen)
- Trombone Concerto No. 1, Motorcykelkonserten, 1988–89 (for Christian Lindberg)
  - shortened version: A short ride on a motorbike, 1989
  - revised version: A motorbike odyssey, 2002
- Trombone Concerto No. 2, Don Quixote, 1994 (for Christian Lindberg)
- Ecos de eternidad, concerto for two trombones, 2009
- The Lemon House, Tuba Concerto, 2004
- Piano Concerto No. 1, 1995
- Bona Spey, Piano Concerto No. 2, 2001

==== Orchestra ====
- Era, 1979–80
- Snowflakes for chamber orchestra, 1980/84
- Acintyas for string orchestra, 1986
- Indri, 1988/89
- Kejsarvisan, 1993
- Ocean child, 1999/2004

=== Vocal ===
==== Opera ====
- Bombi Bitt, 1991–92
- Macbeth², 1996
- K. Beskrivning av en kamp (K. description of a fight), 2005
- God Natt Madame!, 2009

==== Choral ====
- Det är en ros utsprungen (Praetorius/Sandström) for two mixed choirs a cappella, 1990
- Sanctus for male or female choir, 1990, version for mixed choir 1993
- Te Deum (1996) for choir and orchestra
- Biegga luohte for mixed choir, 1998
- Across the bridge of hope for soloist and for mixed choir, 1999
- Ett svenskt requiem for choir, soloists and small orchestra, 2007, text by Christine Falkenland
- The word became flesh, 2010
- Do what is fair for two mixed choirs, two treble choirs and four organs, 2012

=== Chamber music ===
- Wahlbergvariationer for cello and wind quintet, 1990
  - version for saxophone quartet, 1993
- Sång till Lotta for trombone and piano, 1990
