= Es ist ein Ros entsprungen =

Christmas carol and Marian hymn of German origin

- Christmas carol
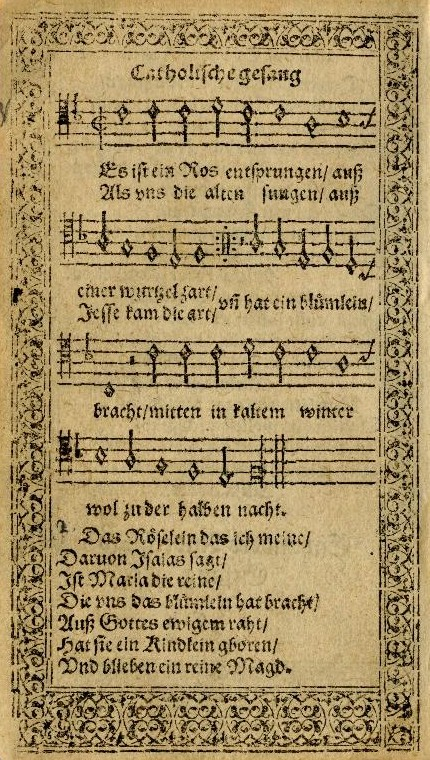
- First printed in the 1599 Speyer Hymnal
- English: Lo, how a rose e'er blooming; A Spotless Rose; Behold a Rose of Judah
- Genre: Hymn
- Occasion: Christmas
- Written: before the 17th century
- Language: German

"Es ist ein Ros entsprungen" (lit. 'A rose has sprung up') is a Christmas carol and Marian hymn of German origin. It is most commonly translated into English as "Lo, how a rose e'er blooming" and is also called "A Spotless Rose" and "Behold a Rose of Judah". The rose in the German text is a symbolic reference to the Virgin Mary. The hymn makes reference to the Old Testament prophecies of Isaiah, which in Christian interpretation foretell the Incarnation of Jesus, and to the Tree of Jesse, a traditional symbol of the lineage of Jesus. Because of its prophetic theme, the hymn is popular during the Christian season of Advent.

The hymn has its roots in an unknown author before the 17th century. It first appeared in print in 1599 in Cologne and has since been published with a varying number of verses and in several translations. It is most commonly sung to a melody harmonized by the German composer Michael Praetorius in 1609. The hymn's popularity endures in the 20th and 21st centuries.

== Meaning ==
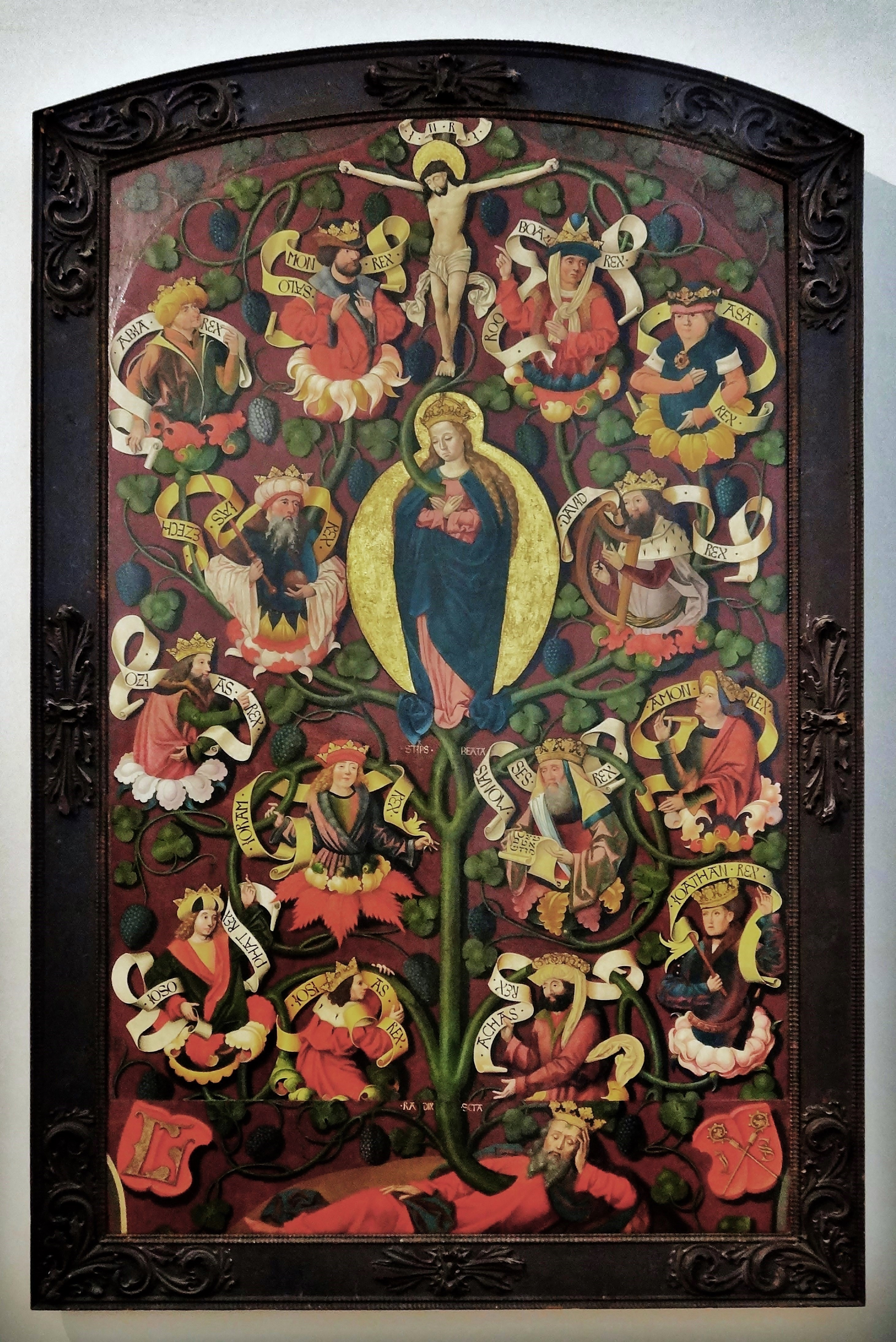
The hymn evokes the symbolic use of the rose to describe Mary sprouting from the Tree of Jesse as the Mother of God (altarpiece, Saint Lambert's Abbey)

The hymn was originally written with two verses that describe the fulfillment of the prophecy of Isaiah foretelling the birth of Jesus. It emphasizes the royal genealogy of Jesus and Christian messianic prophecies. The hymn describes a rose sprouting from the stem of the Tree of Jesse, a symbolic device that depicts the descent of Jesus from Jesse of Bethlehem, the father of King David. The image was especially popular in medieval times, and it features in many works of religious art from the period. It has its origin in the Book of Isaiah:

And there shall come forth a rod out of the stem of Jesse, and a Branch shall grow out of his roots.

— Isaiah 11:1

The second verse of the hymn, written in the first person, then explains to the listener the meaning of this symbolism: That Mary, the mother of Jesus, is the rose that has sprung up to bring forth the Christ child, represented as a small flower ("das Blümlein"). The German text affirms that Mary is a "pure maiden" ("die reine Magd"), emphasizing the doctrine of the Virgin birth of Jesus. In Theodore Baker's 1894 English translation, on the other hand, the second verse indicates that the rose symbolizes the infant Christ.

Since the 19th century, other verses have been added, both in German and in translation.

== History ==
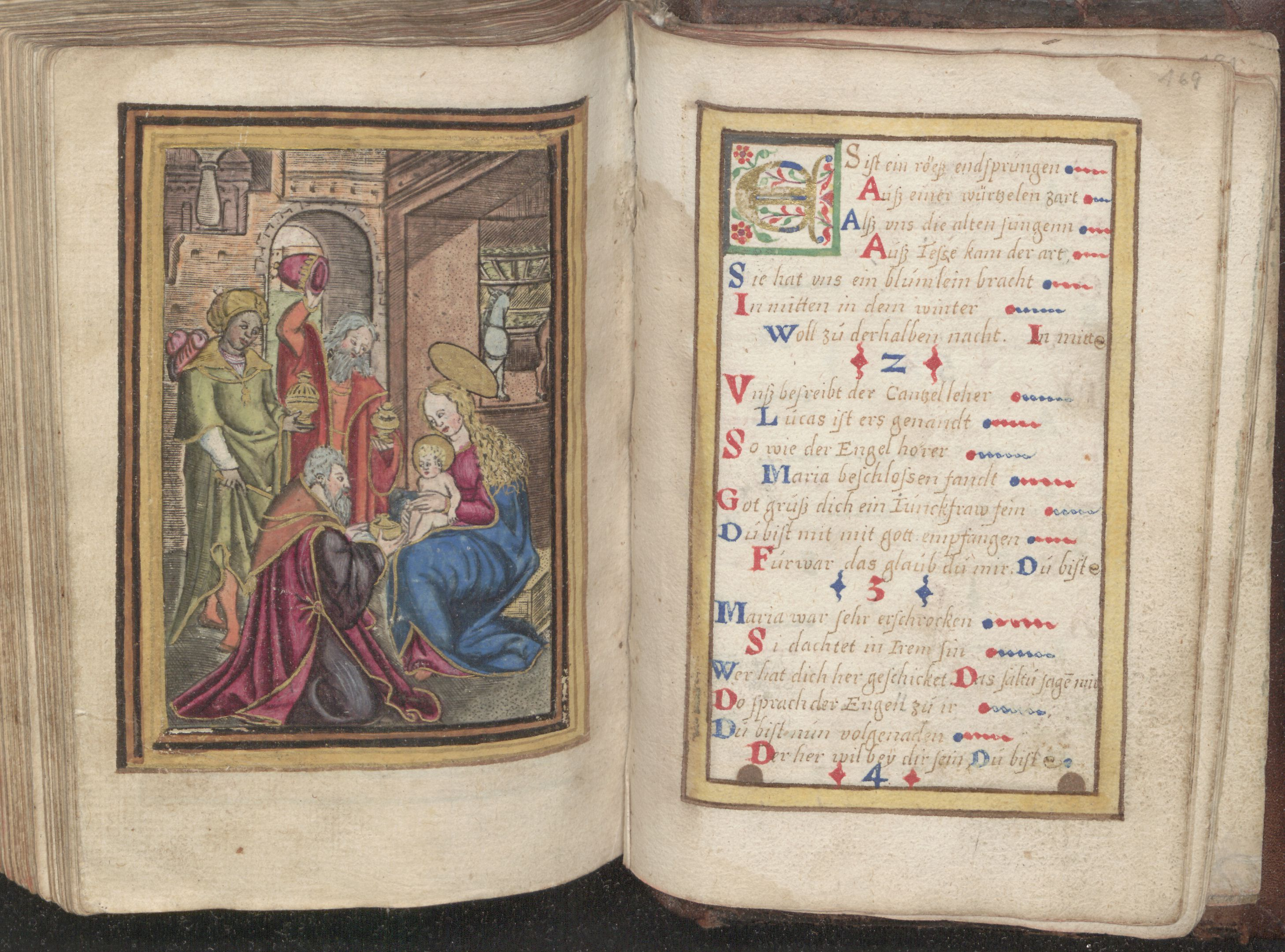
Oldest known version of the hymn, manuscript 2363/2304 8° in the Trier City Library

The poetry of Isaiah's prophecy has featured in Christian hymns since at least the 8th century, when Cosmas the Melodist wrote a hymn about the Virgin Mary flowering from the Root of Jesse, "Ῥάβδος ἐκ τῆς ῥίζης", translated in 1862 by John Mason Neale as "Rod of the Root of Jesse".

The text of "Es ist ein Ros entsprungen" dates from the 15th century. Its author is unknown. Its earliest source is in a manuscript from the Carthusian Monastery of St Alban, in Trier, Germany, that is now preserved in the Trier City Library and is thought to have been in use at the time of Martin Luther. The hymn first appeared in print in the late 16th century in the Speyer Hymnbook (1599). The hymn has been used by both Catholics and Protestants, with the focus of the song being Mary or Jesus, respectively. In addition, there have been numerous versions of the hymn, with varying texts and lengths. In 1844, the German hymnologist Friedrich Layriz added three more stanzas, the first of which, "Das Blümelein so kleine", remained popular and has been included in Catholic and Protestant hymnals.

The tune generally used for the hymn originally appeared in the Speyer Hymnal (printed in Cologne in 1599), and the familiar harmonization was written by German composer Michael Praetorius in 1609. A canon version for four voices also exists, based on Praetorius's harmony and sometimes attributed to his contemporary, Melchior Vulpius. The metre of the hymn is 76.76.676.

Praetorius harmonization

Lo, How a Rose E'er Blooming
Performed by the chorus of the U.S. Army Band, c. 2010

In 1896, Johannes Brahms used the hymn's tune as the base for a chorale prelude for organ, one of his Eleven Chorale Preludes Op. 122, later transcribed for orchestra by Erich Leinsdorf.

During the Nazi era, many German Christmas carols were rewritten to promote National Socialist ideology and to excise references to the Jewish origins of Jesus. During Christmas in Nazi Germany, "Es ist ein Ros entsprungen" was rewritten as "Uns ist ein Licht erstanden / in einer dunklen Winternacht" ("A light has arisen for us / on a dark winter night"), with a secularised text evoking sunlight falling on the Fatherland and extolling the virtues of motherhood.

The hymn's melody has been used by a number of composers, including Hugo Distler who used it as the base for his 1933 oratorio Die Weihnachtsgeschichte (The Christmas Story). Arnold Schoenberg's Weihnachtsmusik (1921) for two violins, cello, piano and harmonium is a short fantasy on Es ist ein Ros entsprungen with Stille Nacht as a contrapuntal melody. In 1990, Jan Sandström wrote Es ist ein Ros entsprungen for two a cappella choirs, which incorporates the setting of Praetorius in choir one.

=== English translations ===
Well-known versions of the hymn have been published in various English translations. Theodore Baker's "Lo, How a Rose E'er Blooming" was written in 1894 and appears in the Psalter Hymnal (Christian Reformed Church in North America) and The United Methodist Hymnal (American United Methodist Church).

The British hymn translator Catherine Winkworth translated the first two verses of the hymn as "A Spotless Rose". In 1919 the British composer Herbert Howells set this text as a motet for SATB choir. Howells stated that:

I sat down and wrote A Spotless Rose...after idly watching some shunting from the window of a cottage in Gloucester which overlooked the Midland Railway. In an upstairs room I looked out on iron railings and the main Bristol to Gloucester railway line, with shunting trucks bumping and banging. I wrote it and dedicated to my mother – it always moves me when I hear it, just as if it were written by someone else.

Howells' carol is through-composed, switching between 7/8, 5/4 and 5/8 time signatures, unconventional for a carol of this era. The plangent final cadence ("On a cold, cold winter's night"), with its multiple suspensions is particularly celebrated. Howells' contemporary, Patrick Hadley reportedly told the composer "I should like, when my time comes, to pass away with that magical cadence". Winkworth's translation was again set to music in 2002 by the British composer and academic Sir Philip Ledger.

A further English translation of the hymn, "Behold, a rose is growing", was written by the American Lutheran musician and writer, Harriet Reynolds Krauth Spaeth (1845–1925). Her four-verse version is often published with an additional 5th verse, translated by the American theologian John Caspar Mattes (1876–1948).

Another Christmas hymn, "A Great and Mighty Wonder", is set to the same tune as this carol and may sometimes be confused with it. It is, however, a hymn by Germanus of Auxerre, "Μέγα καὶ παράδοξον θαῦμα", translated from Greek to English by John Mason Neale in 1862. Versions of the German lyrics have been mixed with Neale's translation of a Greek hymn in subsequent versions such as Percy Dearmer's version in the 1931 Songs of Praise collection and Carols for Choirs (1961).

== Lyrics ==
German original	Baker's version	Winkworth's version	Spaeth's translation with Mattes' 5th verse
Es ist ein Ros entsprungen, (Note: 1599 Speyer version, in modern German) aus einer Wurzel zart, wie uns die Alten sungen, von Jesse kam die Art. Und hat ein Blümlein bracht mitten im kalten Winter, wohl zu der halben Nacht.	Lo, how a rose e'er blooming, From tender stem hath sprung. Of Jesse's lineage coming, As men of old have sung; It came, a flow'ret bright, Amid the cold of winter, When half spent was the night.	A Spotless Rose is blowing, Sprung from a tender root, Of ancient seers' foreshowing, Of Jesse promised fruit; Its fairest bud unfolds to light Amid the cold, cold winter, And in the dark midnight.	Behold, a Branch is growing Of loveliest form and grace, as prophets sung, foreknowing; It springs from Jesse's race And bears one little Flow'r; In midst of coldest winter, At deepest midnight hour.
Das Röslein, das ich meine, davon Isaias sagt, ist Maria die reine, die uns das Blümlein bracht. Aus Gottes ew'gem Rat hat sie ein Kind geboren und blieb ein reine Magd.(Catholic version) or: Welches uns selig macht.(Protestant Version)	Isaiah 'twas foretold it, The Rose I have in mind, With Mary we behold it, The virgin mother kind; To show God's love aright, She bore to men a Savior, When half spent was the night.	The Rose which I am singing, Whereof Isaiah said, Is from its sweet root springing In Mary, purest Maid; Through God's great love and might The Blessed Babe she bare us In a cold, cold winter's night.	Isaiah hath foretold it In words of promise sure, And Mary's arms enfold it, A virgin meek and pure. Thro' God's eternal will This Child to her is given At midnight calm and still.
			The shepherds heard the story, Proclaimed by angels bright, How Christ, the Lord of Glory, Was born on earth this night. To Bethlehem they sped And in a manger found him, As angel heralds said.
Das Blümelein, so kleine, (Note: Verses added by Friedrich Layriz in 1844) das duftet uns so süß, mit seinem hellen Scheine vertreibt's die Finsternis. Wahr Mensch und wahrer Gott, hilft uns aus allem Leide, rettet von Sünd und Tod.	O Flower, whose fragrance tender With sweetness fills the air, Dispel with glorious splendour The darkness everywhere; True man, yet very God, From Sin and death now save us, And share our every load.		This Flow'r whose fragrance tender With sweetness fills the air, Dispels with glorious splendor The darkness ev'rywhere. True Man, yet very God; From sin and death He saves us And lightens ev'ry load.
Lob, Ehr sei Gott dem Vater, dem Sohn und heilgen Geist! Maria, Gottesmutter, sei hoch gebenedeit! Der in der Krippen lag, der wendet Gottes Zorn, wandelt die Nacht in Tag.			
O Jesu, bis zum Scheiden aus diesem Jammerthal; Laß dein Hilf uns geleiten hin in der Engel Saal, In deines Vaters Reich, da wir dich ewig loben: o Gott, uns das verleih!			O Saviour, Child of Mary, Who felt our human woe; O Saviour, King of Glory, Who dost our weakness know, Bring us at length we pray, To the bright courts of Heaven; And to the endless day.

== See also ==
- Es ist ein Ros entsprungen (Sandström)
- List of Christmas carols
