= Porsön =

- Residential area
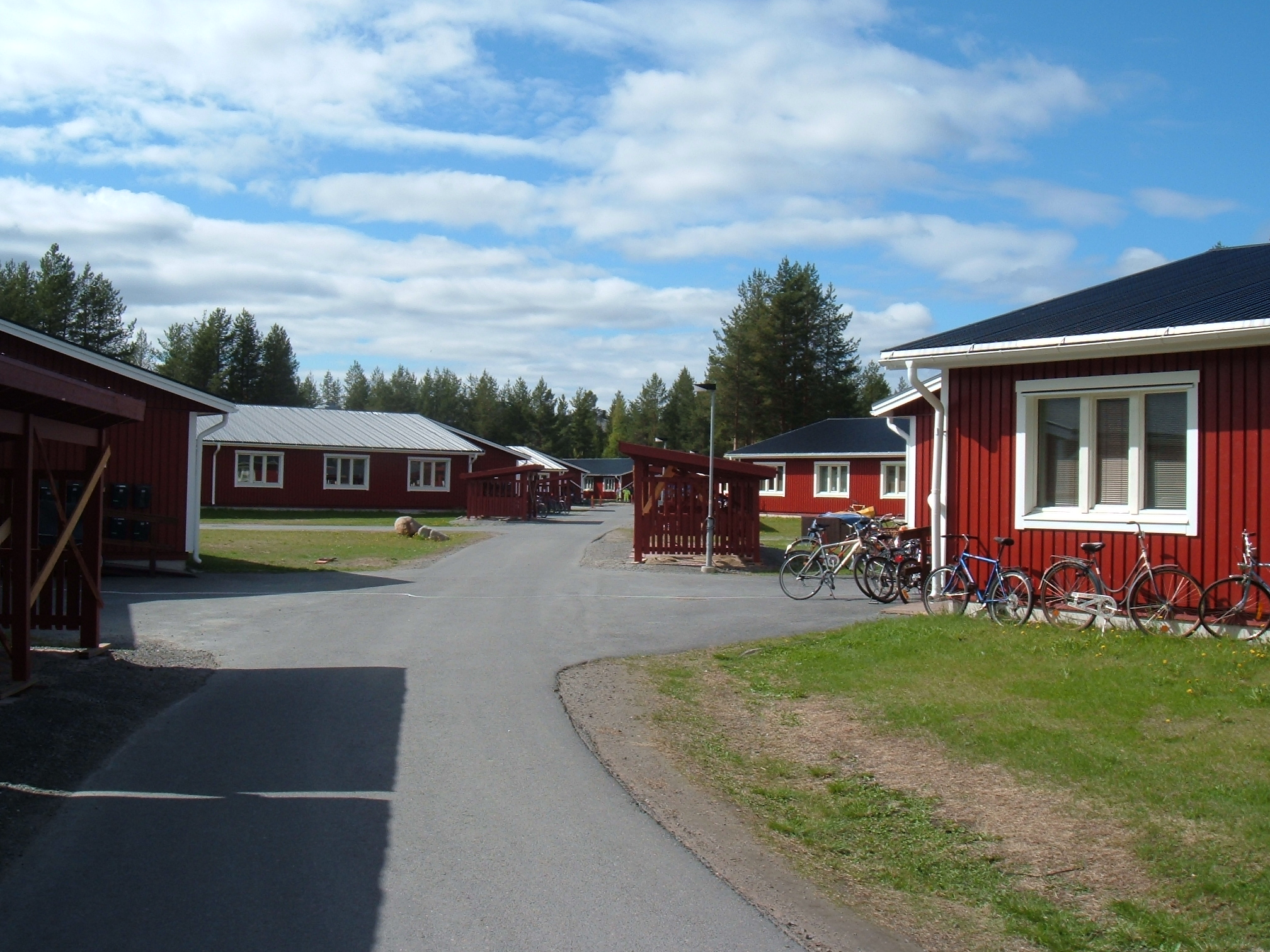
- Porsögården student residential buildings

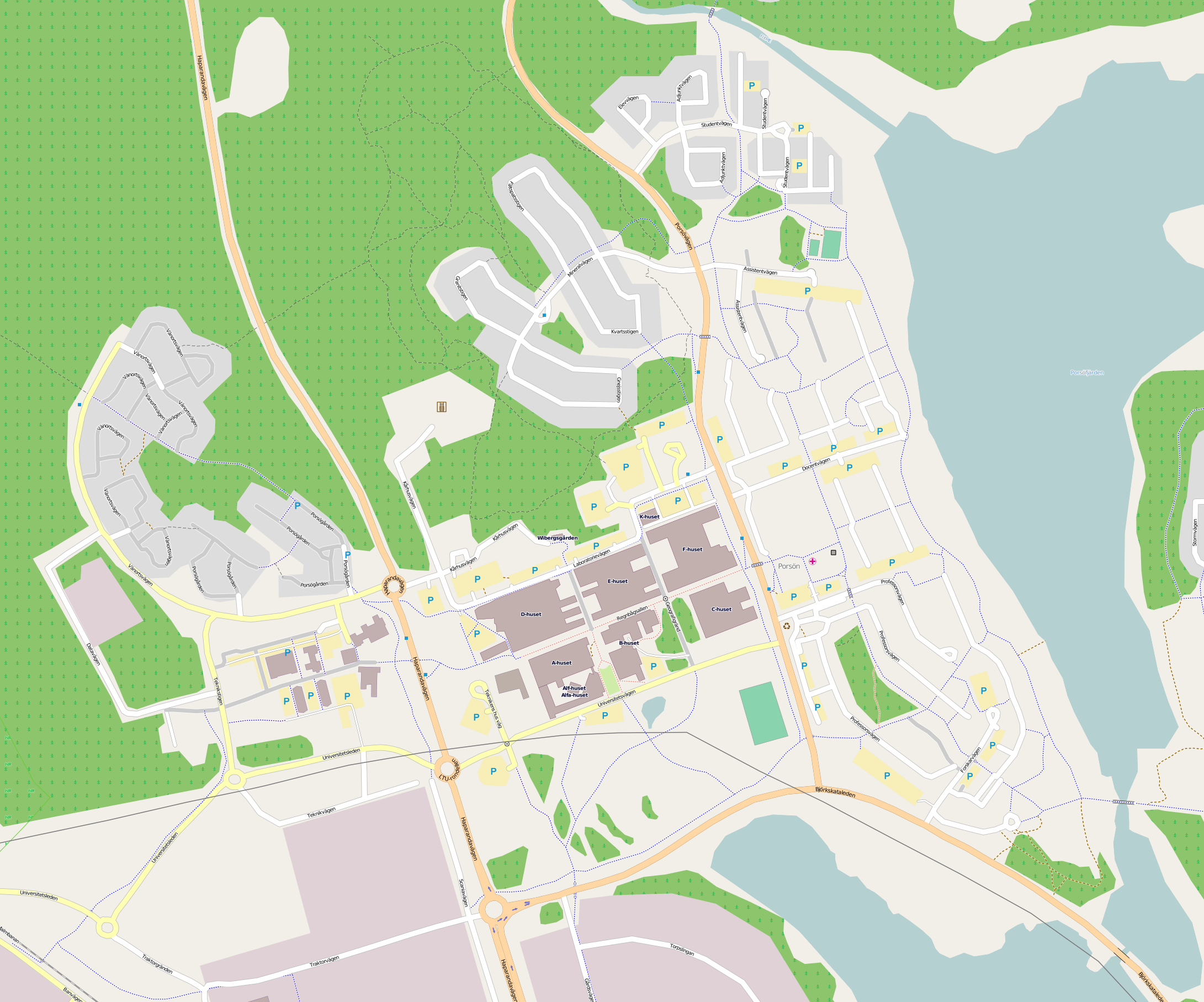
- Map of Porsön, from OpenStreetMap
- Coordinates: 65°37′N 22°08′E
- Country: Sweden
- Province: Norrbotten
- County: Norrbotten County
- Municipality: Luleå Municipality

Population (2010)
  - Total: 5,476
- Time zone: UTC+1 (CET)
  - Summer (DST): UTC+2 (CEST)

Porsön is a peninsula and residential area in Luleå, Sweden. It had 5,476 inhabitants in 2010 and is home to a large number of students. Luleå University of Technology and the business park Aurorum are located in the area.

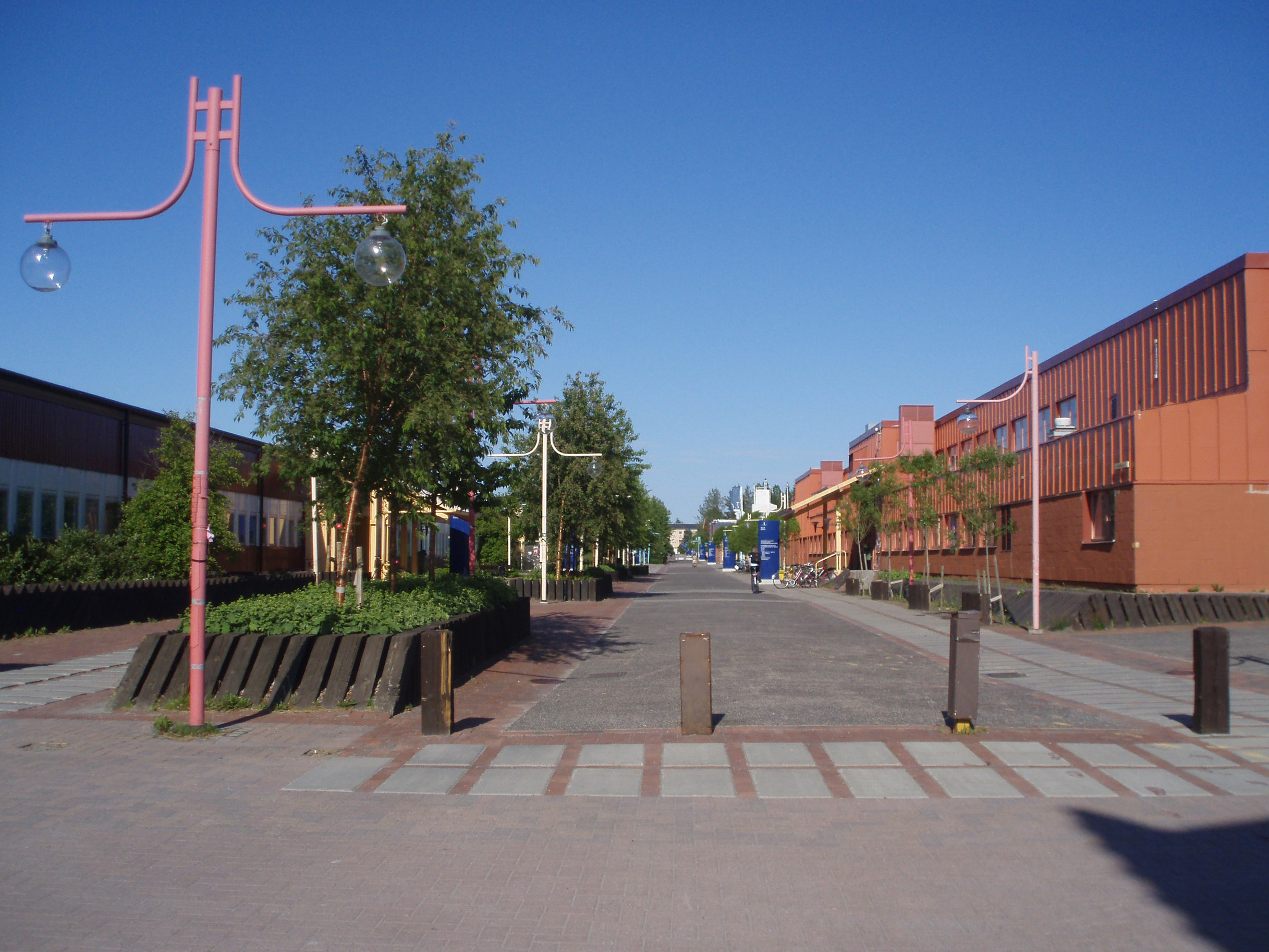
Luleå University of Technology
