= Birgitta Bergvall-Kåreborn =

Swedish academic

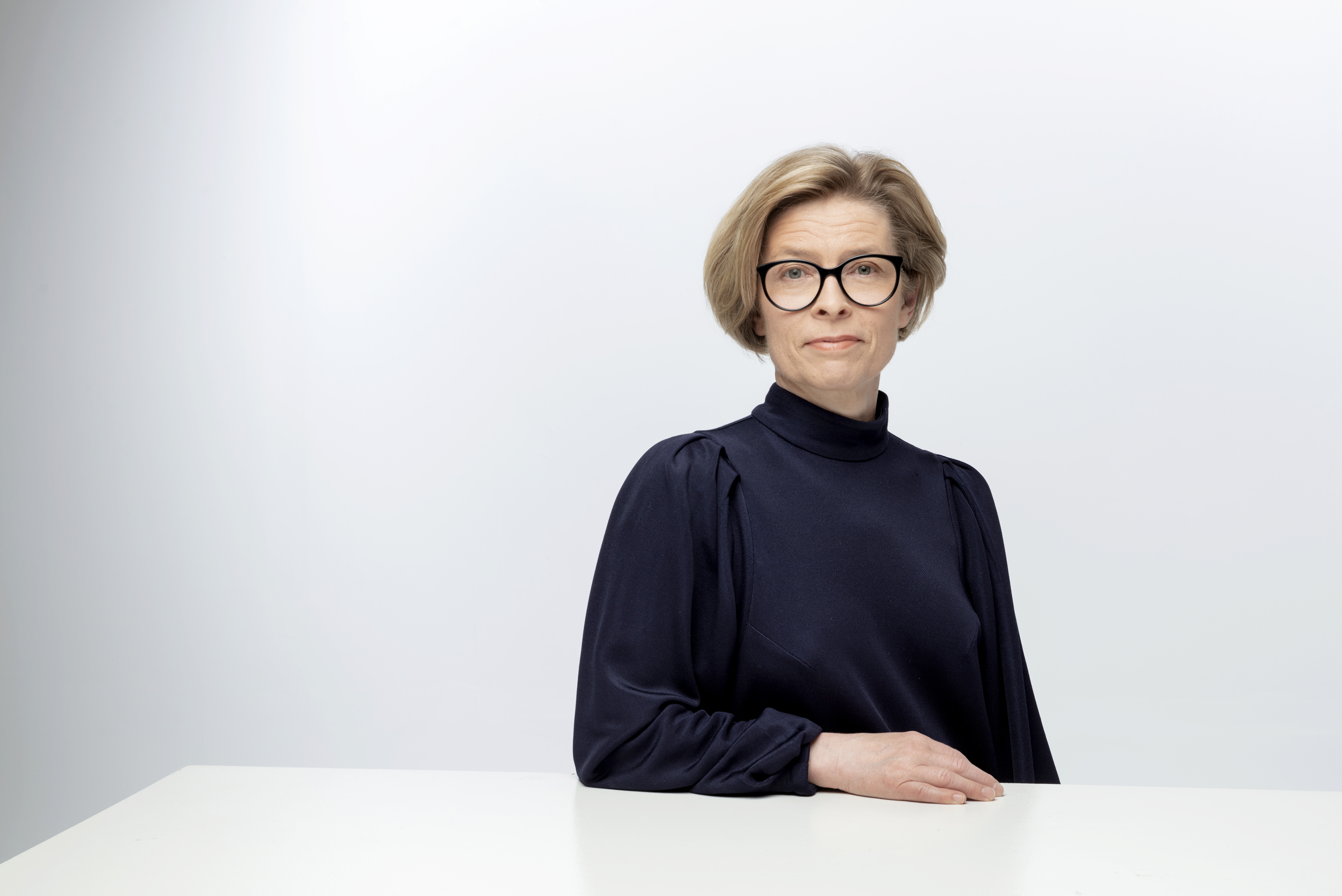
- Born: 18 February 1968 (age 58)
- Education: Luleå University of Technology
- Known for: Vice-chancellor at Luleå University of Technology
- Scientific career
- Fields: information systems
- Thesis: "A Multi-Modal Approach to Soft Systems Methodology" (2002)

Birgitta Bergvall-Kåreborn (born 18 February 1968) is a Swedish academic and professor of information systems. Since December 1, 2017 Bergvall-Kåreborn is the vice-chancellor at Luleå University of Technology.

Bergvall-Kåreborn defended her thesis ("A Multi-Modal Approach to Soft Systems Methodology") in 2002 at Luleå University of Technology. Since 2009, she is professor of information systems. She has also been the university's pro vice chancellor.
