= Die Weihnachtsgeschichte =

- Oratorio by Hugo Distler
- Opus: 10
- Occasion: Christmas
- Text: Nativity by Luke and Matthew; Es ist ein Ros entsprungen
- Language: German
- Composed: 1933
- Published: 2015
- Scoring: soloists, chamber choir a cappella

Die Weihnachtsgeschichte (The Christmas Story), Op. 10, is an oratorio by Hugo Distler, composed in 1933. He set Biblical texts about the nativity of Jesus in German, interspersed with different settings of stanzas of the hymn "Es ist ein Ros entsprungen", for soloists and choir a cappella. A critical edition was published by Carus-Verlag in 2015.

== History and text ==
Distler composed Die Weihnachtsgeschichte in 1933 as a Christmas oratorio for a chamber choir.

The text begins with the prophecy "Das Volk, so im Finstern wandelt, siehet ein Licht". The text related to the nativity is almost exclusively taken from the Bible in the translation by Martin Luther, quoting both Luke and Matthew. It includes the canticles of Mary and of Simeon. The Biblical narration is interspersed by stanzas of the hymn "Es ist ein Ros entsprungen". The biblical narration is based on Luke 2:1–21 and Matthew 2:1–23. The narrator is a tenor as the Evangelist, and other solo voices appear for Gabriel, Mary, Elisabeth, the angel of the annunciation to the shepherds, Herod and Simeon. The oratorio ends with a setting of "Also hat Gott die Welt geliebet, daß er seinen eingeborenen Sohn gab" from the Gospel of John. Carus-Verlag published a critical edition in 2015.

== Scoring and music ==
The work is scored for soloists and a chamber choir a capella, with soloists that can be drawn from the choir. The narrator is a tenor, the angels of the annunciation and the annunciation to the shepherds are sopranos, Mary and Elisabeth altos, and Herod and Simeon basses. Other characters are portrayed by choral singing: the hosts of angels, the shepherds, the wise men, and priests and scribes. The choir is in four part (SATB), and at times divided in two choirs. The stanzas of the hymn are set as different chorale variations. The narration is framed by motets, that can be performed individually, as also the chorale variations.

Distler described the work as an oratorio of chamber music character (Oratorium mit kammermusikalischem Charakter). Formally it is inspired by a cappella works by Heinrich Schütz. Distler's expressive music still uses features of the 20th century, with characteristic quarts, pentatonic melodies and an often polymetric setting. The work takes about 43 minutes to perform.
