= Anja Daniela Wagner =

German opera singer

Anja Daniela Wagner (born 11 March 1969, in Halle/Saale) is a German operatic mezzo-soprano and photographer.

== Life and work ==
After a training in picture retouching, Wagner, the daughter of the artist couple Heidi Wagner-Kerkhof and Hannes H. Wagner, studied singing at the University of Music and Theatre Leipzig with Jitka Kovarikova. With Cornelia Melian from Munich, she also received training in "historical singing" in early music. After graduating, she completed postgraduate studies at the Hochschule für Musik Carl Maria von Weber in Dresden. Her teacher there was Hartmut Zabel. This was followed by master classes with Jessica Cash, Hermann Christian Polster and chamber music singer Brigitte Fassbaender.

Wagner gave her debut on the opera stage during her studies as Hansel in E. Humperdinck's Hänsel und Gretel at the Zwickau theatre.

In 2003 she was engaged at the Theater Nordhausen and is active there until today (2017). In 2004 she took part in the world premiere of the opera The Legend of Paul and Paula (after the same name film) by Ludger Vollmer as Paula / Laura. As in the film, the opera is based on the novel by Ulrich Plenzdorf. She sang a.o. Carmen in Carmen, Dorabella in Così fan tutte, Olga in Eugene Onegin, Flora Bervoix in La Traviata, Anita in West Side Story, Nehebka in Aida and the Countess in Der Wildschütz by Albert Lortzing at the Nordhausen and Meiningen theatres.

Her activity in the singing of oratorios is manifold.

In the CD production of the liturgical movements by Hugo Distler she was awarded the German Record Prize "Echo Klassik" as soloist for the alto voice in 2001.

In 2017 she received the 11th Nordhäuser Theater Prize, an award for special artistic achievements. It is a foundation of the Kreissparkasse Nordhausen.
