= Cathrine Winnes =

Norwegian conductor (born 1977)

Cathrine Winnes, born 1977, is a Norwegian music conductor.

== Career ==
Winnes studied music pedagogy and classic saxophone at Norwegian Academy of Music (2000) and conducting at Royal College of Music, Stockholm (2002) under the Professor Jorma Panula, and Norwegian Academy of Music (2004) with teachers Ole Kristian Ruud and Per Sigmund Thorp among others. She has graduated with a master's degree in orchestral conducting. She has conducted several of the Norwegian professional orchestras: Oslo Philharmonic, Norwegian Radio Orchestra, Trondheim Symphony Orchestra, Norwegian Arctic Philharmonic Orchestra in Tromsø and all of Norway's professional military orchestras.

She has been guest conductor in Odense Symphony Orchestra in Denmark, Helsingborg's Symphony Orchestra in Sweden, the National Opera Orchestra of Estonia and in August 2013 she became the principal conductor at Östgöta Blåsarsymfoniker.

Winnes is the artistic director at the Symphony Orchestra at the University of Oslo and in 2008 she started to work as a lecturer in conducting at the Norwegian Academy of Music.

In 2015, she conducted the world premiere of Cecilie Ore’s opera Adam and Eve at the Bergen International Festival and the Ultima Oslo Contemporary Music Festival. She has also took part in the Ultima Festival in 2016, where she conducted for the Oslo Philharmonic Orchestra, in the world premiere of Trond Reinholdsens Piano Concerto. In 2016 she led the Swedish Radio Symphony Orchestra choirs Christmas Concert, broadcasting on Swedish television SVT. In Autumn 2017, she made her debut with the Royal Philharmonic Orchestra in Stockholm.
