= Piteå School of Music =

Music school in Sweden

Coordinates: 65.3280°N 21.4652°E

The Piteå School of Music School is a part of the Department of Music and Media at Luleå University of Technology, and located at its Piteå campus in northern Sweden.

The school was founded in 1978. Well-known professors at the school include composer Jan Sandström and organist Hans-Ola Ericsson. Since 2007, the music school offers a 3-year bachelor's and 2-year master’s program.

Studio Acusticum, located at Piteå Science Park, is part of the music school and since 2012, has been home to Orgel Acusticum, a 9,000-pipe organ.
