= Motorbike Odyssey =

Motorbike Odyssey is the Trombone Concerto No. 1 by Swedish composer Jan Sandström. The concerto for solo tenor trombone and large orchestra, written in 1989, is sometimes called Motorbike Concerto. It was dedicated to the trombone virtuoso Christian Lindberg. The piece is meant to be a musical telling of a modern Odysseus, traveling the world with his trombone.

== Orchestration ==
The orchestration is complex, calling for a large orchestra with additional piano, harp, full percussion section and virtuoso bell plate striker. The solo part, at almost 24 minutes in length, is highly complex, spanning the bass, tenor, and treble clefs and calling for considerable extended technique.

== The performance ==
Lindberg's world premiere serves as the guideline for how the piece should be performed. The audience sits facing the stage and the orchestra tuning. Suddenly, there is a loud engine sound, and a white motorcycle rolls onto the stage, driven by Lindberg. He is dressed in full, light red leathers and generally makes a very impressive sight. Wasting no time, the orchestra begins with haunting chords, shrieking lower and lower, and the concerto begins.

In the first movement, the soloist imitates the sound of a motorcycle changing gears. The extended trombone technique of flutter tonguing is used in combination with a plunger mute to create this effect. As the trombone section takes over this sound, the soloist shifts into a complicated passage of very high, and very fast notes. This eventually subsides into the cessation of the soloist's playing, as he physically draws out the parts of the globe with his trombone slide.

Movement two is an evocation of the Florida Everglades. The soloist begins by playing the "crocodile chorus", a multiphonic passage that requires the soloist to produce chords with the trombone, as well as sing. This section also includes growling sounds, and other various extended trombone techniques.

Movement three suggests a motorcycle race through French Provence during a Christian procession. It includes more motorcycle sounds, this time with the soloist playing along with the entire trombone section. Eventually the upper winds start playing a religious-sounding melody, and the soloist plays very lightly in the background, the sound of a motorcycle. Though it is the sound of a distant machine, the tones harmonize with the procession music. Eventually the soloist plays a countermelody against the processional music. The movement ends with the soloist playing a very high and loud note until his air is gone. Then he sucks in with a deathly sound and begins the next movement.

Movement four is based on the sounds of aboriginal tribes and the desert of Australia. It is essentially a long, virtuoso trombone solo played in imitation of the didgeridoo. The soloist plays a pedal B-flat, and sings an F, a twelfth higher. This, combined with different articulations, screams and occasional harmonic changes, creates a sound resembling didgeridoo. The movement ends with another gasp for air.

Movement five is the finale. It begins with a slightly altered version of the "Crocodile Chorus", and recaps the various other movements of the piece. It ends with the soloist flutter tonguing a very loud note while spinning around in circles. This creates a sinusoidal sound effect, with a rising and falling volume. The soloist takes one last gasp for air and harmonizes with the orchestra on a final note that fades into silence.
