= Hugo Distler =

German organist, conductor, teacher and composer

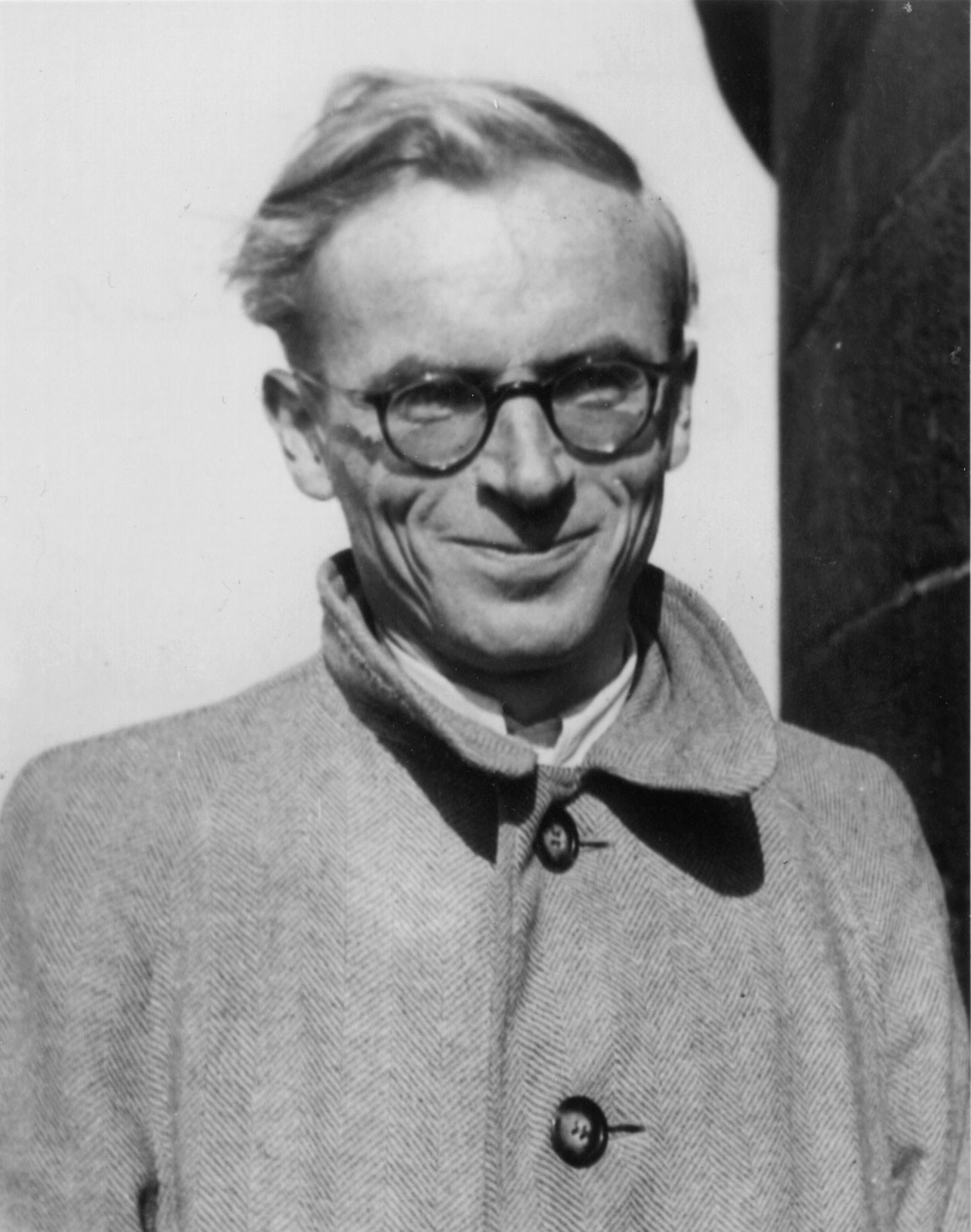
- The composer in 1941
- Born: 24 June 1908; Nürnberg, German Empire
- Died: 1 November 1942 (aged 34); Berlin, Nazi Germany
- Education: Leipzig Conservatory
- Occupations: Organist; Choral conductor; Composer; Academic teacher
- Organizations: Lübeck Conservatory; Spandauer Kirchenmusikschule; Musikhochschule Stuttgart; Berliner Hochschule für Musik

August Hugo Distler (24 June 1908 – 1 November 1942) was a German organist, choral conductor, teacher and composer.

== Life and career ==
Born in Nuremberg, Distler attended the Leipzig Conservatory from 1927 to 1931, first as a conducting student with piano as his secondary subject, but changing later, on the advice of his teacher, to composition and organ. He studied there with Martienssen (piano), Günther Ramin (organ) and Grabner (harmony).

He became the organist at St. Jacobi in Lübeck in 1931. In 1933 he married Waltraut Thienhaus. That same year he joined the NSDAP (National Socialist German Workers' Party), reluctantly, as his continued employment depended on his doing so. In October 1933 Distler was appointed head of the chamber music department at the Lübeck Conservatory, and at about the same time he began teaching at the Spandauer Kirchenmusikschule (Spandau school of church music).

In 1937 Distler was appointed as a lecturer at the Württemberg Hochschule für Musik in Stuttgart, where he also directed its two choirs. In 1940 he moved to Berlin to teach and conduct at the Hochschule für Musik there, and in 1942 he was named the conductor of the State and Cathedral Choir.

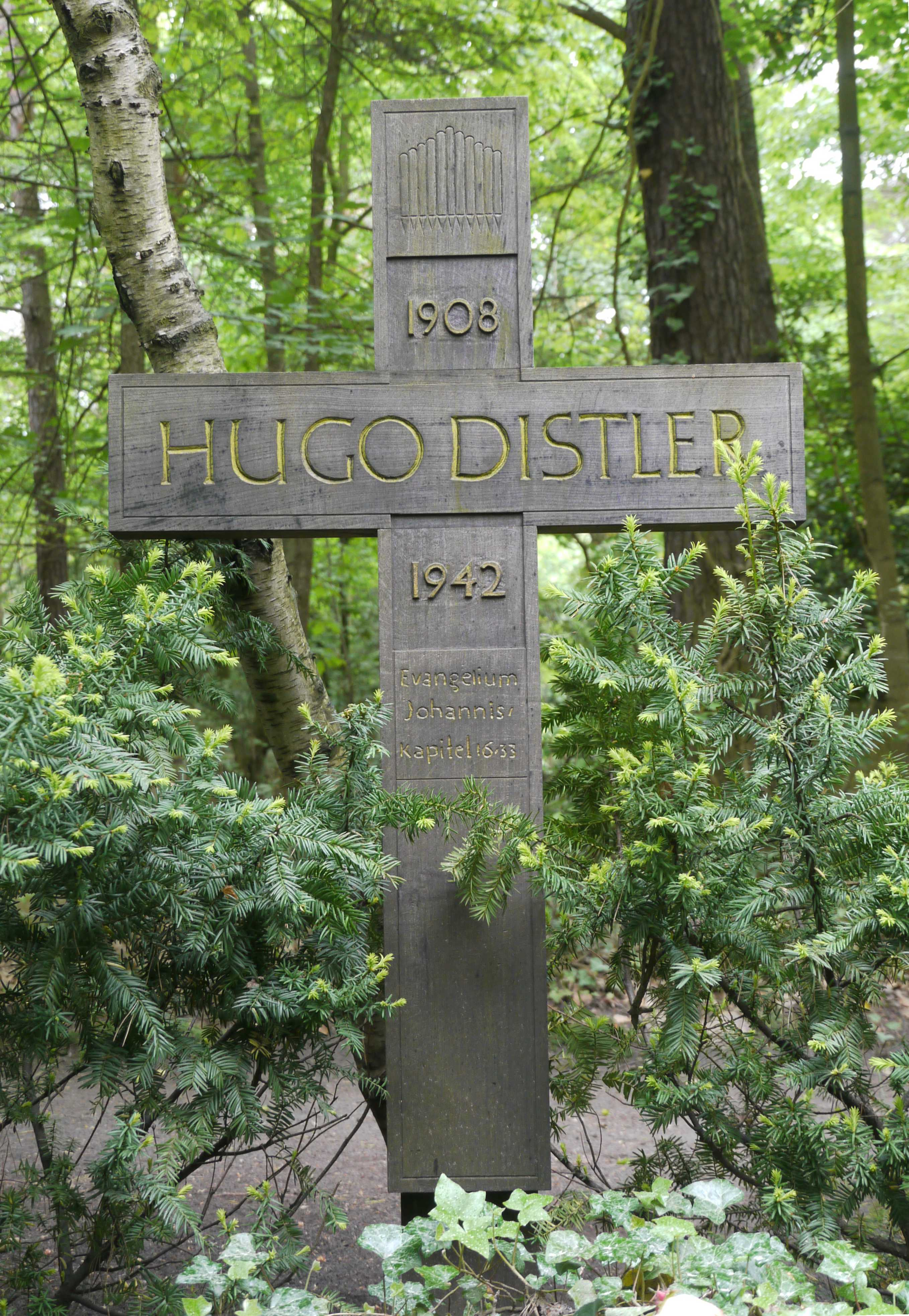
Hugo Distler's grave at the Stahnsdorf South-Western Cemetery near Berlin

He became increasingly depressed owing to the deaths of friends, aerial attacks, restrictions placed upon his teaching, a sense of isolation, and the constant threat of conscription into the German Army, all of it culminating in his suicide in Berlin at the age of 34. However, his suicide was probably not a direct result of antagonistic government pressure; "rather, it appears that he saw the futility of attempting to serve both God and Nazis, and came to terms with his own conscience unequivocally." He is buried in the Stahnsdorf South-Western Cemetery.

== Music ==
Distler enjoyed his first success in 1935 at the official Kassel Music Days (Kasseler Musiktage). He achieved his greatest public success in 1939 at the German Choral Music Festival in Graz, when the Stuttgart Hochschule choir gave the première of sections from the Mörike-Chorliederbuch; the event was regarded as the climax of the festival, but the dissemination of the work took place only after the war. His Mörike-Chorliederbuch is now recognized as "the most important German secular a cappella collection of the 20th century."

He composed chamber pieces, works for solo piano and two concertos (one for harpsichord in 1935 and 1936 and one for piano in 1937), but he is known mostly for his sacred choral music and as a champion of Neo-Baroque music. His works are a re-invention of old forms and genres, rich with word painting, based on the music of Heinrich Schütz and other early composers.

His music is polyphonic and frequently melismatic, often based on the pentatonic scale. His works remain "tonally anchored", while at the same time they "reveal an innovative harmonic sense". Because of these characteristics, his music was stigmatized by some Nazis as "degenerate art".

He is now recognized as "one of the most significant German composers of his generation". He is often associated with other German neo-Baroque choral composers, including Johann Nepomuk David, Ernst Pepping and Wolfgang Fortner. Distler's style was spread by choirs in Germany and abroad during the years after World War II, stimulating and influencing other later composers.

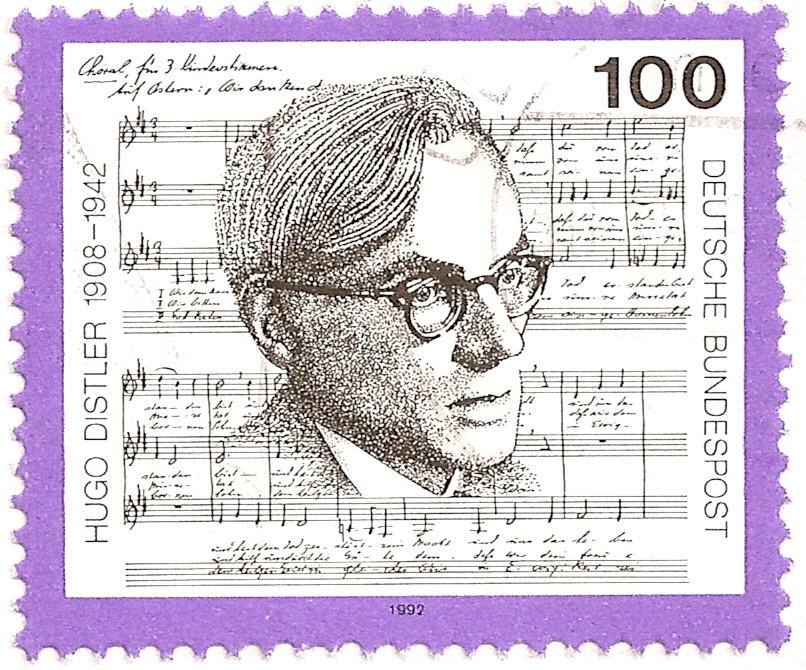
The composer on a German stamp of 1992

In 1953 a choir in Berlin was named for the composer, the Hugo-Distler-Chor, an ensemble that is still active today. In 1992 a German stamp was designed honouring him. Distler's style and importance spread to the United States through the influence of organists including Larry Palmer, who wrote the first important book on the composer in the English language, and subsequently by organist and composer Justin Rubin, who performed the entire cycle of Distler's keyboard works in New York City in 1995.

== Writings ==
- Postulat eines neuen musikalischen Lebens- und Gestaltungsprinzips, Der Wagen (1933), 77–84
- Neue Unterrichtswege in der Berufsausbildung des praktischen Kirchenmusikers, Lübeckische Blätter, lxxvi (1934), 147–48
- with E. Thienhaus: Die beiden Orgeln in St Jakobi zu Lübeck (Lübeck, 1935)
- Gedanken zum Problem der Registrierung alter, speziell Bachscher Orgelmusik, Musik und Kirche, xi (1939), 101–06
- Funktionelle Harmonielehre (Kassel, 1941)
- Harmonielehre früher und jetzt, Zeitschrift für Hausmusik, x (1941), 41–46

== Compositions and discography ==
- Opus 1 – Konzertante Sonate für 2 Klaviere (Concerto sonata for two pianos)
- Opus 2 – Choralmotette "Herzlich lieb hab’ ich dich, o Herr", on Schalling's hymn "I love you, O Lord"
  - Hugo Distler Ensemble Lüneburg, cond. Erik Matz, Thorofon CTH 2551, Chorwerke (2008)
- Opus 3 – Eine deutsche Choralmesse (a German choral mass)
  - Hugo Distler Ensemble Lüneburg, cond. Erik Matz, Thorofon CTH 2551, Chorwerke (2008)
- Opus 4 – Kleine Adventsmusik (Little Advent Music)
- Opus 5 – Der Jahrkreis (The Circle of the Liturgical Year)
  - Westfälische Kantorei (Westphalian Chorale), Wilhelm Ehmann cond., Cantate C 57620 (1968) (this may be the only recording of all 25 movements on a single disc)
  - Frederike Urban, Anja Daniela Wagner, Leipziger Universitätschor, Pauliner Kammerorchester, cond. Wolfgang Unger, Thorofon Classics CTH 2420, Liturgische Sätze (2001) (six of 25 movements)
  - Hugo Distler Ensemble Lüneburg, cond. Erik Matz, Thorofon CTH 2551 Chorwerke (2008)
  - Sjaella (women), Ensemble Nobiles (men), Rondeau ROP 6068 (2012) – Op. 5 Nr. 12, 15, 38, 39, 51
- Opus 5a
  - Op. 5a Nr. 2 Aus tiefer Not (Liedsatz für gemischten Chor) (Out of the depths), song set for mixed choir
  - Op. 5a Nr. 3 Christe, du bist der helle Tag (Liedsatz für gemischten Chor) (Christ, you are the light of day), song set for mixed choir
    - Hugo Distler Ensemble Lüneburg, cond. Erik Matz, Thorofon CTH 2551, Chorwerke (2008) – Op. 5a Nr. 2 and 3
- Opus 6/I – Kleine geistliche Abendmusik (Small sacred evening music)
- Opus 6 Nr. 2 – Drei kleine Choralmotetten (Three little chorale motets)
  - Frederike Urban, Anja Daniela Wagner, Leipziger Universitätschor, Pauliner Kammerorchester (Leipzig University Choir, Paulist Chamber Orchestra), cond. Wolfgang Unger, Thorofon Classics CTH 2420, Liturgische Sätze (2001)
- Opus 7 – Choralpassion (Choral Passion)
  - Musica Vocalis, Beekman, Schoonenboom, Noordam, cond. Harm Jansen, NED Sound NS-CS 230501 (1993)
  - Kammerchor der Universität Dortmund (Chamber Choir of the University of Dortmund), Kooy, Jochens, Miehlke, cond. Willi Gundlach, Thorofon Classics CTH 2185 (1993)
  - Netherlands Chamber Choir, cond. Uwe Gronostay, Globe GLO 5175 (1996)
  - Hugo-Distler-Chor Berlin, cond. Klaus Fischer-Dieskau, Andre Cardino, tenor (Evangelist), Jahannes Richter, bass (Jesus), ebs 6117 (2003)
- Opus 8 Orgelwerke (Organ Works)
  - Op. 8 Nr. 1 – Orgelpartita "Nun komm, der Heiden Heiland"
  - Op. 8 Nr. 2 – Orgelpartita "Wachet auf, ruft uns die Stimme" (Organ partita, "Sleepers awake, the voice is calling") (3 movements: Toccata, Bicinium, Fuge)
  - Op. 8 Nr. 3 – Kleine Orgelchoral-Bearbeitungen (Little organ chorale arrangements) (7 movements)
    - Rudolf Innig, Organ, Thorofon Classics CTH 2215, Totentanz (1994) – Op. 8 Nr. 2
    - Armin Schoof / Kleine Jakobi-Orgel Lübec (The Small Jakobi Organ in Lübeck), Thorofon Classics CTH 2293, Orgelwerke Vol. 1 (1995) – Op. 8, Nr. 1, 2, 3
- Opus 9 Nr. 1 – Das Lied von der Glocke (Song of the Bell) after Schiller's poem
- Opus 9 Nr. 2 – An die Natur (Weltliche Kantate) (On Nature (Secular cantata))
- Opus 10 – Die Weihnachtsgeschichte (The Christmas Story) (for 4-part a cappella choir and four soloists)
  - Thomanerchor, Hans-Joachim Rotzsch, Berlin Classics Eterna 0092462BC (1979)
  - Kammerchor der Hochschule der Künste Berlin (Chamber Choir of the University of the Arts Berlin), Stephanie Petitlaurent, Silvia Fricke, Klaus Thiem, Rudolf Preckwinkel, cond. Christian Grube, Thorofon Classics CTH 2281, Die Weihnachtsgeschichte (1997)
- Opus 11 Choralkantaten (Chorale cantatas)
  - Opus 11 Nr. 1 – Wo Gott zum Haus nit gibt sein Gunst (If the Lord does not give the house his favor)
  - Opus 11 Nr. 2 – Nun danket all und bringet Ehr (Now thank all, and bring honour)
    - Frederike Urban, Anja Daniela Wagner, Leipziger Universitätschor, Pauliner Kammerorchester (Leipzig University Choir, Paulist Chamber Orchestra), cond. Wolfgang Unger, Thorofon Classics CTH 2420, Liturgische Sätze (2001) – Op. 11 Nr. 1 and 2
- Opus 12 – Geistliche Chormusik (Sacred Choral Music)
  - Op. 12 Nr. 1 – Singet dem Herrn ein neues Lied (Sing to the Lord a new song) (3 movements)
  - Op. 12 Nr. 2 – Totentanz (Dance of Death) (14 movements with dialogue)
  - Op. 12 Nr. 3 – O Gott, in deiner Majestät (O God, in your Majesty) (7 movements)
  - Op. 12 Nr. 4 – Singet frisch und wohlgemut (Sing freshly and cheerfully) (3 movements)
  - Op. 12 Nr. 5 – Ich wollt, dass ich daheime wär (I wish that I were home)
  - Op. 12 Nr. 6 – Wachet auf, ruft uns die Stimme (Motette) (Awake, the voice calls us (motet)) (3 movements)
  - Op. 12 Nr. 7 – In der Welt habt ihr Angst (In the world ye shall have tribulation)
  - Op. 12 Nr. 8 – Das ist je gewißlich wahr (That is indeed ever true)
  - Op. 12 Nr. 9 – Führwahr, er trug unsere Krankheit (Truly, he bore our sickness)
    - Kammerchor der Universität Dortmund, Krämer, Heesche-Wagner, Innig, Sprecher: Will Quadflieg, cond. Willi Gundlach, Thorofon Classics CTH 2215, Totentanz (1994) – Op. 12 Nr. 2, 6
    - Berliner Vokalensemble, cond. Bernd Stegmann, Cantate Reflections C 57007 (1994), Cantate C 58007 (1995) – Op. 12 Nr. 2, 5, 6, 7, 8, 9
    - Netherlands Chamber Choir, cond. Uwe Gronostay, Globe GLO 5175 (1996) – Op. 12 Nr. 2, 14
    - MonteverdiChor München, cond. Konrad von Abel, Thorofon Classics CTH 2463, Geistliche Chormusik (2005), Op. 12 Nr. 1, 2, 5, 6, 7, 9
    - Sajella (women), Ensemble Nobiles (men), Rondeau ROP 6068 (2012) – Op. 12 Nr. 1, 2, 5, 7, 8, 9
- Opus 13 – Liturgische Sätze über altevangelische Kyrie- und Gloriaweisen (Liturgical pieces On the High Church Kyrie- and Gloria melodies) (3 movements)
  - Frederike Urban, Anja Daniela Wagner, Leipziger Universitätschor, Pauliner Kammerorchester, cond. Wolfgang Unger, Thorofon Classics CTH 2420, Liturgische Sätze (2001); also on the Adora label
- Opus 14 – Konzert für Cembalo und Streichorchester (Concerto for Harpsichord and String Orchestra)
  - Martin Haselböck (harpsichord and conducting), Wiener Akademie, Thorofon Classics CTH 2403, Cembalokonzert (1999)
  - Huguette Dreyfus (harpsichord), Deutsche Bachsolisten (German Bach Soloists), cond. Martin Stephani, Musicaphon M 56860 (2003)
- Opus 15a – Sonate für zwei Geigen und Klavier (Sonata for Two Violins and Piano)
- Opus 15b – Elf kleine Klavierstücke für die Jugend (11 Little Piano Pieces for Young People)
  - Annette Töpel Piano, Musicaphon (2008)
- Opus 16 – Neues Chorliederbuch
  - Op. 16 Nr. 1 Kalendersprüche I (6 movements)
  - Op. 16 Nr. 2 Kalendersprüche II (6 movements)
  - Op. 16 Nr. 3 Kalendersprüche III (6 movements)
  - Op. 16 Nr. 4 Kalendersprüche IV (7 movements)
  - Op. 16 Nr. 5 Minnelieder I (3 movements)
  - Op. 16 Nr. 6 Minnelieder II (3 movements)
  - Op. 16 Nr. 7 Bauernlieder (Peasant Songs) (3 movements)
  - Op. 16 Nr. 8 Fröhliche Lieder (3 movements)
    - Carmina Mundi, Aachen, cond. Harald Nickoll EBS 6076 (1996–97) – Op. 16 Nr. 1–8
- Opus 17 – Drei geistliche Konzerte für Sopran und Orgel (Three Sacred Concertos for Soprano and Organ)
- Opus 18
  - Opus 18 Nr. 1 – Dreißig Spielstücke für die Kleinorgel oder andere Tasteninstrumente (Thirty Pieces for Small Organ or Other Keyboard Instruments)
  - Opus 18 Nr. 2 – Orgelsonate (Organ Sonata) (Trio)
    - Armin Schoof / Restaurierte Hausorgel von Hugo Distler (Hugo Distler's house organ, restored), Thorofon Classics CTH 2294, Orgelwerke Vol. 2 (1996) – Op. 18 Nr. 1 and 2
    - Annette Töpel, Piano, Musicaphon (2008) – Op. 18, Nr. 1, 2, 3, 4, 5, 8, 10, 12–17, 25–30
- Opus 19 – Mörike-Chorliederbuch (Eine Auswahl) (Choral song book on poems by Mörike)
  - Berliner Vokalensemble, Bernd Stegman, Musicaphon M 51820 (1993)
  - Kammerchor d. Hochschule d. Künste Berlin, cond. Christian Grube, Thorofon Classics CTH 2231, Mörike-Chorliederbuch (1994) (24 songs)
  - Carmina Mundi, Nickoll, EBS 6074, Mörike-Chorliederbuch, Vol. 1 (1995)
  - Carmina Mundi, Nickoll, EBS 6077, Mörike-Chorliederbuch, Vol. 2 (1995)
  - John Brock, Organ, Complete Recordings Ltd. 022 (1997) (the organ movements from op. 19 and 22, with works of Bach, Buxtehude, and Scheidt)
- Opus 20 Nr. 1 – Streichquartett a-moll (String Quartet in A minor)
- Opus 20 Nr. 2 – Konzertstück für 2 Klaviere (Concert Piece for 2 Pianos)
- Opus 20 (D-WD 40) - Im Munde des Drachen (In the Mouth of the Dragon) (SATB Standalone piece) (1935)
- Opus 21 Nr. 1 Lied am Herde (Kantate, Gedicht von Fritz Dietrich) (Song at the Hearth (cantata poem by Fritz Dietrich))
- Opus 21 Nr. 2 – Kleine Sing- und Spielmusik (Little Music for Young Players)
- Opus 22 – Orgelwerke (Organ Works)
  - John Brock, Organ, Complete Recordings Ltd. 022 (1997) (the organ movements from op. 19 and 22, with works of Bach, Buxtehude, and Scheidt)

Works without opus number

- Orchestra and/or concerto
  - Stage Music to "Knight Bluebeard" by Ludwig Tieck
    - Katharina Wingen, Stefan Livland, Neubrandenburger Philharmonie (New Brandenburg Philharmonic Orchestra), cond. Stefan Malzew, Musicaphon M 56860 (2008)
  - Konzert für Cembalo und 11 Solo-Instrumente (Concerto for Harpsichord and 11 Solo Instruments) (1930–32)
    - Martin Haselböck (harpsichord and conducting), Wiener Akademie, Thorofon Classics CTH 2403, Cembalokonzert (1999)
- Organ works
  - Erhalt uns, Herr, bei deinem Wort (manuscript, on Luther's hymn), Keep us Lord) (2 movements)
    - Armin Schoof / Kleine Jakobi-Orgel Lübeck, Thorofon Classics CTH 2293, Orgelwerke Vol. 1 (1995)
  - Wie schön leucht uns der Morgenstern (handschriftl. überliefert) (How Beautifully Luminous Is the Morning Star (from handwritten manuscript)
    - Armin Schoof / Kleine Jakobi-Orgel Lübeck (Small Jakobi organ in Lübeck), Thorofon Classics CTH 2293, Orgelwerke Vol. 1 (1995)
    - Armin Schoof / Restaurierte Hausorgel von Hugo Distler (Hugo Distler's house organ, restored), Thorofon Classics CTH 2294, Orgelwerke Vol. 2 (1996)
  - Vom Himmel hoch, da komm ich her (From Heaven high I come)
    - Armin Schoof / Restaurierte Hausorgel von Hugo Distler (Hugo Distler's house organ, restored), Thorofon Classics CTH 2294, Orgelwerke Vol. 2 (1996)
- Piano works
  - Three-Part Invention, for piano
  - Largo for piano
  - Piano Sonata in C ("Kleine Sonate") Work
    - Annette Töpel Piano, Musicaphon (2008)
- Choral works
  - Die Sonne sinkt von hinnen (Liedsatz für gemischten Chor) (The sun goes down from here) (hymn setting for mixed choir)
  - Der Tag hat sich geneiget (Liedsatz für gemischten Chor)
  - Ach Herr, ich bin nicht wert (Motette) (Oh Lord, I am not worthy (motet)
    - Hugo Distler Ensemble Lüneburg, cond. Erik Matz, Thorofon CTH 2551, Chorwerke (2008)
  - Wacht auf, es tut Euch not! (1936)
    - MonteverdiChor München, cond. Konrad von Abel, Thorofon Classics CTH 2463, Geistliche Chormusik (2005)
  - Liedmotetten zur Weihnacht (Song motets for Christmas)
    - Kammerchor der Hochschule der Künste Berlin (Chamber Choir of the University of the Arts Berlin), Stephanie Petitlaurent, Silvia Fricke, Klaus Thiem, Rudolf Preckwinkel, cond. Christian Grube, Thorofon Classics CTH 2281, Die Weihnachtsgeschichte (1997)
