= Luleå University of Technology =

University in Sweden

- Luleå tekniska universitet
- Former name: Luleå tekniska högskola
- Motto: Forskning och utbildning i världsklass
- Type: Public university
- Established: 1971; 55 years ago as Luleå University College, 1997; 29 years ago as University
- Affiliations: EUA, UArctic
- President: Birgitta Bergvall-Kåreborn
- Academic staff: 611 Full-Time Equivalents (FTEs) (2024)
- Administrative staff: 534 Full-Time Equivalents (FTEs) (2024)
- Students: 18,740 (2024)
- Doctoral students: 395 Full-Time Equivalents (FTEs) (2024)
- Location: Luleå, Sweden; 65°37′05″N 22°08′20″E
- Campus: Luleå, Kiruna, Skellefteå, Piteå
- Website: www.ltu.se

Luleå University of Technology is a public research university in Norrbotten County, Sweden. The university has four campuses located in the Arctic Region in the cities of Luleå, Kiruna, Skellefteå, and Piteå.

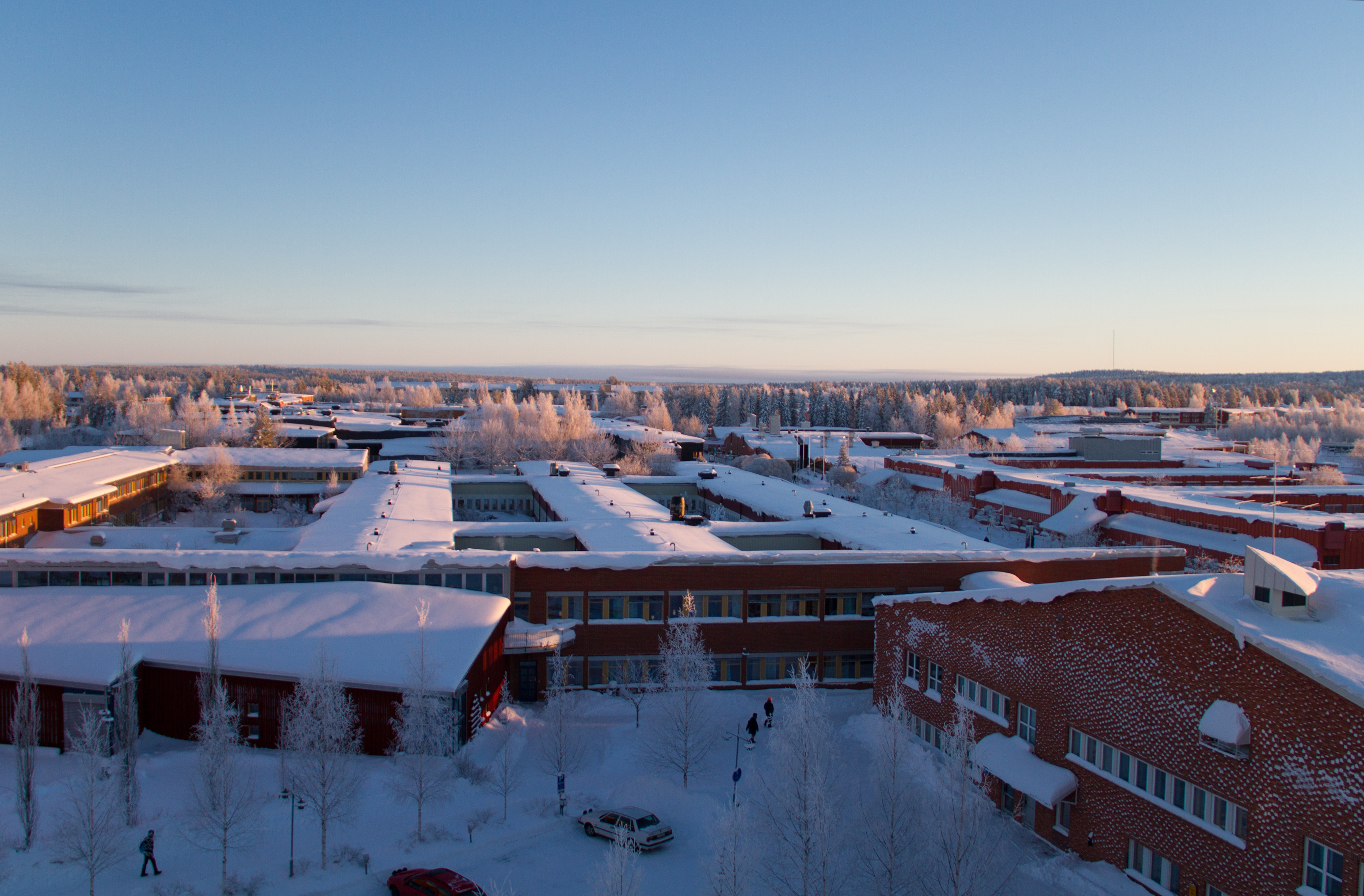
Campus Luleå on Porsön

With more than 19,000 students and about 1,500 employees, Luleå University of Technology is a middle-sized academic institution in Sweden and Scandinavia's northernmost Institute of technology.

The university was originally established in 1971 under the name Luleå University College and had its first campus in the suburbs of Porsön in Luleå. But was a couple of years later merged with the Teacher's Training College of Luleå and the School of Music of Piteå. In 1997, the institution was granted full university status by the Swedish government and became then thereafter renamed as Luleå University of Technology.

== Research ==
Since 2023 research at Luleå University of Technology has been organized into 11 research areas:

- Built Environment and Infrastructure
- Architecture and Design
- Mines and Minerals
- Mechanical Engineering and Materials
- Energy
- Digitalisation, Automation and Artificial Intelligence
- Space
- Business Administration and Social Sciences
- Health
- Education
- Music and Theatre

The University's strategic research foundation lies within the technical field, but most areas are interdisciplinary. A significant part of the research is applied and conducted in close collaboration with industry, other universities, and organizations at regional, national, and international levels.

== International collaboration ==
The University is an active member of the University of the Arctic. UArctic is an international cooperative network based in the Circumpolar Arctic region, consisting of more than 200 universities, colleges, and other organizations with an interest in promoting education and research in the Arctic region.

The University also participates in UArctic's mobility programme north2north. The aim of the programme is to enable students of member institutions to study in different parts of the North. Luleå University of Technology is the Swedish National Funding Agency for the north2north programme.

Additionally, Luleå University of Technology is part of the European University Alliance UNIVERSEH, which was established in 2020. UNIVERSEH focuses on space and the space sector, but is interdisciplinary in nature engaging students and staff from all areas of the university.

Outside of the European Union, Luleå University of Technology participates in three strategic networks: MIRAI (with Japanese universities); SASUF (with South African universities); and ACCESS (with Chilean universities).

Luleå University of Technology has a permanently-staffed office in Brussels - the LTU European Office.

== Campuses ==
=== Campus Kiruna ===
Campus Kiruna is part of Umeå University and Luleå University of Technology. It is home to space-related research conducted by the Division of Space Technology in close collaboration with the Swedish Institute of Space Physics.

=== Campus Luleå ===
The university campus in Luleå is located in the Porsön area and consists of several main buildings.

- A Building houses education and research in computer science, economics, and social sciences.
- B Building contains the university library, main reception, and administrative offices.
- C Building serves as a central meeting place for students, hosting student union offices and student sports facilities.
- E Building is dedicated to research and education in physics and mechanical engineering.
- F Building accommodates activities in geosciences, civil engineering, and work sciences.

D Building was dismantled in 2024, and according to the university’s future campus plan, a new building will be constructed on the site. Currently, parts of the teacher education and health sciences programs are housed in temporary pavilions due to ongoing renovations.

Nearby, there are amenities such as a grocery store, dental care services, housing, and the science center Teknikens Hus.

=== Campus Piteå ===
Campus Piteå focuses on research and education in music and media. Located at the Piteå campus, Orgel Acusticum was built by the renowned European firm Orgelbauwerkstatt Woehl under the direction of Gerald Woehl. The organ consists of 9,000 pipes distributed across 140 registers, with plans to expand to a total of 206 registers.

During its inauguration in October 2012, Luleå University of Technology’s honorary doctor Benny Andersson premiered a specially composed piece, En skrift i snön (A Writing in the Snow), with lyrics by Kristina Lugn. The organ is owned by the university and partially funded by donors, with the Kempestiftelserna foundation being the largest contributor.

=== Campus Skellefteå ===
Campus Skellefteå is a center for higher education, offering research and education in areas such as wood technology, computer graphics, game development, electrical power engineering, nursing, and social work.

=== Theatre Academy in Luleå ===
The Theatre Academy in Luleå is the acting program at Luleå University of Technology. The program is based in the same building as Norrbottensteatern in central Luleå and was established in 1996 as a collaboration between the university and the theater. It educates actors for theater, television, film, and radio.

University rankings

Global – Overall
- ARWU World: 801–900 (2020)
- CWTS World: 990 (2023)
- USNWR Global: 710 (2022-2023)

Global – Science and engineering
- ARWU Electrical & Electronic Engineering: 201-300 (2023)
- ARWU Computer Sciences & Engineering: 201-300 (2023)
- QS Engineering & Tech.: 401-450 (2023)

Regional – Overall
- USNWR Europe: 289 (2022-2023)

National – Overall
- ARWU National: 13-14 (2020)
- CWTS National: 11 (2023)
- USNWR National: 12

National – Science and engineering
- ARWU Electrical & Electronic Engineering: 5 (2023)
- USNWR Engineering: 5

== Notable alumni ==
- Katherine Bennell-Pegg, Australian astronaut

== See also ==
- List of universities in Sweden
- List of forestry universities and colleges
- Piteå School of Music
