= List of classical trombonists =

This list presents an overview of notable classical trombonists, including their primary affiliations and active years of playing.

== Orchestral trombonists ==
Name	Orchestral Timespan	Primary Affiliation
Susan Addison		Orchestra of the Eighteenth Century
Jonas Bylund	Since c.1987	professor Hochschule für Musik, Theater und Medien Hannover (HMTMH), former Solo Trombone Oslo Philharmonic Orchestra, Royal Stockholm Philharmonic Orchestra and Bamberger Symphoniker
Joseph Alessi	Since 1985	New York Philharmonic
Ian Bousfield	2000–2012	Vienna Philharmonic Orchestra
Gordon W. Bowie	1985–1997	Bangor Symphony Orchestra
Dudley Bright	2001–2018	London Symphony Orchestra
Peter Moore	2014–2025	London Symphony Orchestra
Abbie Conant	1980–1993	Munich Philharmonic Orchestra
Eric Crees	Retired	Royal Opera House, Covent Garden
Jay Friedman	Retired	Chicago Symphony Orchestra
Byron Fulcher	Since 2001	Philharmonia Orchestra
Robert Gale		Chamber Orchestra of Philadelphia, Opera Company of Philadelphia
Nitzan Haroz	Since 2012	Philadelphia Orchestra
Megumi Kanda	Since 2002	Milwaukee Symphony Orchestra
Mark Kellogg	Since 1989	Rochester Philharmonic Orchestra
Mark Lawrence	Since 1979	San Francisco Symphony
Robert Marsteller	?–1975	Los Angeles Philharmonic
James Olin	Since 1976	Baltimore Symphony
Jörgen van Rijen	Since 1997	Royal Concertgebouw Orchestra
Charles Vernon	Since 1986	Chicago Symphony Orchestra
Helen Vollam	Since 2004	BBC Symphony Orchestra
Helen Vollam	Since 2011	Chamber Orchestra of Europe

== Retired orchestral trombonists ==
Vladislav Blazhevich	1906–1928	Bolshoi Theatre
James DeSano	1970–2003	Cleveland Orchestra
Mark Lawrence	1974–2007	San Francisco Symphony Orchestra
Aline Nistad	1979–2016	Oslo Philharmonic Orchestra
Maisie Ringham	1944–1955	The Hallé
Ralph Sauer	1974–2006	Los Angeles Philharmonic
Douglas Yeo	1985–2012	Boston Symphony Orchestra
Dorothy Ziegler	1944–1958	St. Louis Symphony Orchestra
Denis Wick	1957–1988	London Symphony Orchestra

== Soloists and chamber trombonists ==
Name	Recording Timespan	Primary Affiliation
Abbie Conant	Since 1980	Munich Philharmonic
Stuart Dempster	Since 1964	University of Washington
Vinko Globokar	Since 1965	IRCAM
Mark Hetzler		Empire Brass Quintet
Achilles Liarmakopoulos	Since 2011	Canadian Brass
Christian Lindberg	Since 1984	Soloist
Alain Trudel	Since 1990	Soloist

== See also ==
List of jazz trombonists
