= Doc Souchon =

American jazz musician

Edmond "Doc" Souchon (October 25, 1897, New Orleans – August 24, 1968, New Orleans) was an American jazz guitarist and writer on music. He was a pivotal figure in the historical preservation of New Orleans jazz in the middle of the 20th century.

Souchon received schooling to become a physician in Chicago, though he was playing regularly in groups such as the Six and Seven Eighths Band in the 1910s. He helped oversee a reconstitution of this band in 1945 as a four-piece, and made many recordings of early string band tunes through the early 1960s. Alongside this, Souchon recorded with many noted New Orleans jazz mainstays, such as Johnny Wiggs, Sherwood Mangiapane, Papa Jack Laine, Raymond Burke, and Paul Barbarin.

Souchon was involved early on in the management of the New Orleans Jazz Club, and served as president of the organization early in its existence. He had his own radio program on WWL, and edited the journal Second Line from 1951 until his death in 1968. Aside from his contributions to jazz journals such as Jazz and Jazz Report, Souchon compiled a photo book with Al Rose entitled New Orleans Jazz: A Family Album, first published in 1967 and subsequently revised in 1978 and 1984.

He helped establish the National Jazz Foundation in 1942, as well as the New Orleans Jazz Museum about a decade later. His record collection, which included some 2,000 recordings of New Orleans jazz, was bequeathed to the New Orleans Public Library, and many other music-related materials he collected are now in the possession of the William Ransom Hogan Jazz Archive at Tulane University.

== Discography ==
- Doc Souchon and His Milneburg Boys (1969)
