= Thierry Caens =

French classical trumpeter

Thierry Caens (born 1958) is a French classical trumpeter.

== Life ==
Born in Dijon (Burgundy), Caens began studying the trumpet at the age of six with his father Marcel Caens (also father of the saxophonist Jean-Pierre Caens). He was a pupil of Robert Pichaureau, Pierre Pollin and Maurice André.

In 1997, he obtained the first prize for trumpet and the first prize for cornet in 1978 at the Conservatoire de Paris in Maurice André's class.

A sought-after soloist, he is a guest of the world's greatest venues, from Victoria Hall in Geneva to Tokyo Bunka Kaikan, the United States, China, Italy and Paris (Salle Pleyel, Salle Gaveau, Radio France, Théâtre des Champs-Élysées, Théâtre du Châtelet, etc.). With Jean-François Paillard, he has recorded the main pages of J.S Bach, G.F Handel and J. Haydn.

Caens is also known for his many participations with other musicians, including Manuel Rocheman, Yves Jamait, Daniel Fernandez, Vladimir Cosma, William Sheller (on the album Les Machines absurdes issued in 2000), Jean Ferrat, Richard Galliano and many others.

He also played the solo trumpet part of more than 50 soundtracks, including Jean-Paul Rappeneau's Cyrano de Bergerac.

A great soloist, Caens is at the origin of many projects and arrangements.

== Career ==
- Solo trumpet with the Orchestre National de Lyon in 1975.
- Founder of the "Arban Qunitet" with Jean-Paul Leroy (trumpet teacher at the Orléans Conservatory) in 1976.
- Solo cornet at the Opéra Garnier in 1982.
- Professor at the Dijon Conservatory since 1985.
- Artistic director of the Camerata de Bourgogne, Burgundy Chamber Orchestra, since 1987.

He also played with Yves Henry and founded a trio with Michel Becquet and André Cazalet, soloist with the Orchestre de Paris.
