= Valeriy Pisigin =

Russian writer, historian and musicologist

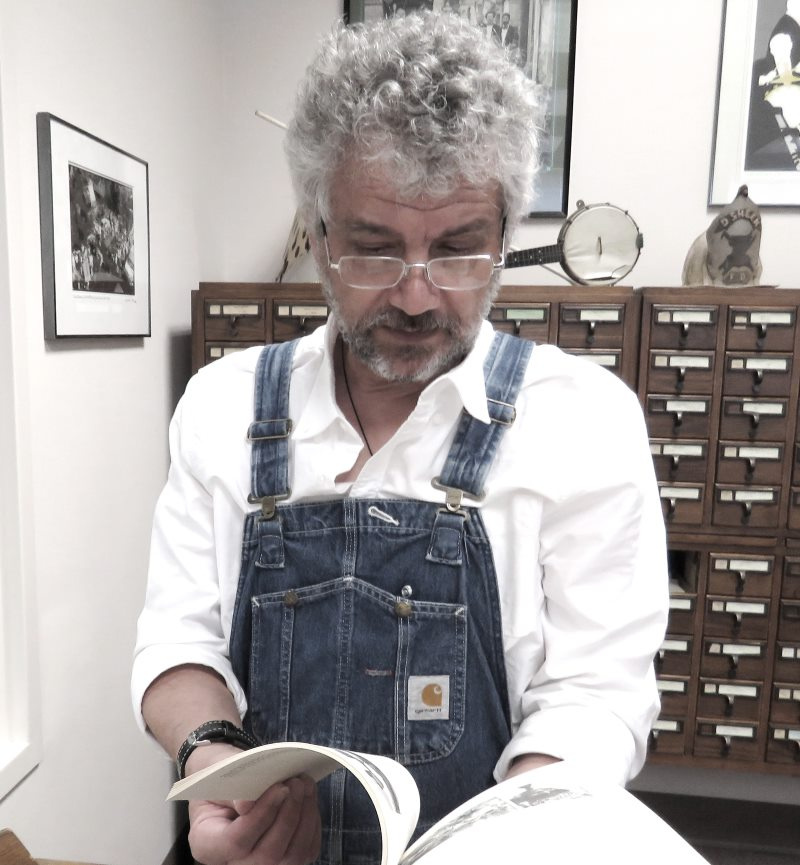
- Valeriy Pisigin at Hogan Jazz Archive, Tulane University, New Orleans, LA, April 2016
- Born: September 21, 1957 (age 68); Chelyabinsk, USSR
- Education: Kazan State University
- Occupations: writer, historian
- Spouse: Svetlana Brezitskaya (b. 1977)
- Website: pisigin.ru

Valeriy Fridrikhovich Pisigin (Russian: Вале́рий Фри́дрихович Писи́гин; born September 21, 1957) is a Russian writer; historian; blues, British and American folk music researcher; and former political activist.

== Biography ==
Valeriy Pisigin was born in Chelyabinsk, USSR.

In 1990, he graduated from Kazan State University with specialization of history and social science teaching.

In 1982, created a political club which later was named after Nikolai Bukharin. The major mission of N.I.Bukharin's Political Club was building democracy in Russia.

Pisigin was one of the young informal political leaders in the period of so-called Perestroika launched by Mikhail Gorbachev.

From 1988 to 1990, he took part in some international scientific conferences in Germany, France, and Brazil giving presentations.

From 1988 to 1993, remained president of the Interregional Cooperative Federation of USSR (ICF) which was defending interests of the small and the middle business of the province.

From January 1991 to January 1993, founded The Provincial Weekly Newspaper «Continent» (Провинциальный еженедельник «Континент») and was functioning as its editor in chief.

In February 1992, became a member of Council of Constitutors of weekly newspaper Moskovskiye Novosti (The Moscow News), which was supporting the democratic processes in Russian society.

In April 1992, Pisigin joined the Presidential Consultative Council of Russian Federation.

In November 1992, he repeatedly gave presentations and talks on reforms and problems of the development of enterprise in Russia at universities of USA (New York University, Princeton University, University of Dallas and Duke University in Northern Carolina). In January 1993 Pisigin shared his perspectives on the future of democracy in Russia at the conference "America and Russia in the Future", Washington, USA ("The Future of the Democracy in Russia".

Starting from autumn 1996 to date, Valeriy Pisigin has been primarily focusing on literary work.

From 1995 to 2001, he was working on book series about modern Russia, in which he described painful transformations in people's lives and severe economic depression after the collapse of USSR in the 1990s. Pisigin's books on Russia have been published in monthly literary "thick" magazines Novy Mir and Oktyabr.

Beginning in 2001, has been researching English and American folk music. By the present moment five volumes of "The Stories on English-American Music of 50s and 60s of the 20th Century" and five volumes of the series devoted to the blues "The Coming of the Blues. Vol. 1-5" have been published.

Working on the books about music Pisigin would repeatedly meet and communicate with key figures of American and British folk revival of the 1950s–1960s, such as Pete Seeger, Shirley Collins, Bert Jansch, Izzy Young, Samuel Charters.

Collecting source materials writer travels frequently across USA and Europe.

From autumn 2004, Pisigin has been living in Finland.

== Books ==
- Political Conversations. Poland in 1989 (Политические беседы. Польша 1989). — М.: — 2014. — C.176. — ISBN 978-5-9902482-8-1
- Free Enterprise: Obstacles and Hopes (Свободное предпринимательство: препоны и надежды). Сборник статей. Предисл. М. Я. Гефтера. — Ульяновск: Симбирская книга, 1992. — ISBN 5-8426-0085-4
- Experience of the Failed Counselor (Опыт несостоявшегося советчика). — Пятигорск, 1993.
- Chronicles of Hard Times (Хроники безвременья). — М.:Рудомино, 1995. — C.199. — ISBN 5-7380-0039-0
- Voyage from Moscow to Saint Petersburg (Путешествие из Москвы в Санкт-Петербург). — М.: ЭПИЦентр, 1997. — C.207.— ISBN 5-89069-005-1
- Echo of Pishkin's Line (Эхо пушкинской строки). — М.: ЭПИЦентр, 1998. — C.207. — ISBN 5-89069-006-X
- Two Roads (Две Дороги). — М.: ЭПИЦентр, 1999. — C.268. — ISBN 5-89069-006-X
- Posolon’ / Letters from Chukotka (Посолонь / Письма с Чукотки). — М.: ЭПИЦентр, 2001. — C.460. — ISBN 5-89069-052-3
- The Stories on English-American Music of 50s and 60s of the 20th Century. Vol.1. (Очерки об англо-американской музыке 50-х и 60-х годов XX века. Т.1.) — М.: ЭПИЦентр, 2003. — C.264. — ISBN 5-89069-073-6
- The Stories on English-American Music of 50s and 60s of the 20th Century. Vol.2. (Очерки об англо-американской музыке 50-х и 60-х годов XX века. Т.2.) — М.: ЭПИЦентр, 2004. — C.408. — ISBN 5-89069-091-4
- The Stories on English-American Music of 50s and 60s of the 20th Century. Vol.3. (Очерки об англо-американской музыке 50-х и 60-х годов XX века. Т.3.) — М.: Сельцо Михайловское, 2005. — C.279. — ISBN 5-98179-013-X
- The Stories on English-American Music of 50s and 60s of the 20th Century. Vol.4. (Очерки об англо-американской музыке 50-х и 60-х годов XX века. Т.4.) — М.: Империум Пресс, 2006. — C.328. — ISBN 5-98179-040-7
- The Stories on English-American Music of 50s and 60s of the 20th Century. Vol.5. (Очерки об англо-американской музыке 50-х и 60-х годов XX века. Т.5.) — М.: Империум Пресс, 2007. — C.384. — ISBN 5-98179-040-7
- The Coming of the Blues (Пришествие блюза). Vol.1. Country Blues. Delta Blues. — М.: Империум Пресс, 2009. — C.464. — ISBN 978-5-9622-0024-8
- The Coming of the Blues (Пришествие блюза). Vol.2. Country Blues. Delta Blues. — M.: 2010. — C.320. — ISBN 978-5-9902482-1-2
- The Coming of the Blues (Пришествие блюза). Vol.3. Country Blues. Delta Blues. On Charley Patton's Trails (По следам Чарли Пэттона). — M.: 2012. — C.400. — ISBN 978-5-9902482-4-3
- The Coming of the Blues (Пришествие блюза). Vol.4. Country Blues. Blind Lemon Jefferson. — M.: 2013. — C.320. — ISBN 978-5-9902482-7-4
- The Coming of the Blues (Пришествие блюза). Vol.5. Country Blues. Great Blind Musicians. Blind Willie Johnson (Великие слепые. Блайнд Вилли Джонсон).

== Articles ==
- A Word about M.Y.Gefter (Слово о М. Я. Гефтере). (Co-authored with Len Karpinsky.) «Московские Новости», № 13, 19-26 февраля, 1995 г.
- Len Karpinsky - a Resistant Citizen (Гражданское сопротивление Лена Карпинского). «Московские Новости», № 42, 18-25 июня, 1995 г.
- Resurrected Apprentice in Nest of Sweet Thoughts. Essay on John Ruskin and Marcel Proust (Оживший Подмастерье в гнезде отрадных мыслей. Очерк о Джоне Рёскине и Марселе Прусте). 2001 г.
- In Search of Russian Alternative. Essay on American Historian Stephen F. Cohen (В поисках русской альтернативы. Очерк об американском историке Стивене Коэне). 2007.
- A Life with Pushkin. Remembering V.F.Kashkova (Жизнь пред ликом Пушкина. Памяти В. Ф. Кашковой). 2012 г.
- Story on A.M.Larina-Bukharina's Brief Return to Kremlin after 55-Year Absence (Очерк о том, как А. М. Ларина-Бухарина спустя 55 лет ненадолго вернулась в Кремль). 2014.
- Gennady Golshtein's Alto Saxophone (Альт-саксофон Геннадия Гольштейна). 2015.
- Richter's Autograph. Reminiscing about Sviatoslav Teofilovich Richter's Concert in Naberezhnye Chelny Held on August 21, 1986 ( Автограф Рихтера. Воспоминание о концерте Святослава Теофиловича Рихтера в Набережных Челнах 21 августа 1986 года). 2015.
- The History of One Invisible Sabotage. In Memory of Artist Mikhail Pavlovich Smorodkin (К истории одной неочевидной диверсии. Памяти художника Михаила Павловича Смородкина). 2016 г.
- Vladimir Chekasin's Soprano Saxophone (Сопрано-саксофон Владимира Чекасина). 2016.
- A City and a Museum. Saint Petersburg and Vladimir Deryabkin's Museum of Phonographs and Gramophones (Город и Музей. Санкт-Петербург и Музей граммофонов Владимира Дерябкина). 2016.

== Photo essays on the history of the blues ==
- «Deep South». Photo Essays on the History of the Blues (photo series consisting of 120 parts).

== Sources ==
- Andrei Pankratov. "In the Beginning Was the Word..." (Андрей Панкратов. "Вначале было слово...") // Комсомольская правда.– 1988. – 7 окт.
- Anthony Mason's report for CBS News. Naberezhnye Chelny, USSR, February–March 1989.
- Kuron le Polonais Face a Pissiguine le Russe: Jusqu'ou Liberaliser? // Politis le Citoyen (France). –1989. –N85. Du 21 Décembre –3 Janvier. –P.66-69.
- Jorge Altamira. El Simposio Internacional Sobre Leon Trotsky. Realizado en San Pablo // Prensa Obrera (Argentina). – 1990. – 11 de Octubre. -N 315. -P.14-15.
- Неформальная Россия / О "неформальных" политизированных движениях и группах в РСФСР /Опыт справочника. М.: Мол. Гвардия. - 1990. - С.157.
- Mary Kate Smiley. Yeltsin Supporter Addresses Future of Russian Businesses // The Daily Princetonian. –1992. –Vol.CXVI, №112. –November 11. –P.4 and 9.
- Mikhail Y.Gefter. "The Alternative Economy - the Alternative Individual". Foreword in V.Pisigin's book "Free Enterprise: Obstacles and Hopes" (М.Я.Гефтер. "Альтернативная экономика - альтернативный человек". Предисловие к книге Валерия Писигина "Свободное предпринимательство: препоны и надежды"), 1992.
- Valentina F.Kashkova. Rethinking V.Pisigin's Book "Voyage from Moscow to Saint Petersburg" (В.Ф. Кашкова. Размышления о книге "Путешествие из Москвы в Санкт-Петербург"), 1997.
- Н.Н.Моисеев. С мыслями о будущем России. —М:. —1997. —С.72–73.
- Alexander M.Borschagovsky. "Generations Detached" (А.М. Борщаговский. "Порвалась связь времен"), 1997.
- Andrei Sinyavsky. The Russian Intelligentsia. N.Y., Columbia University Press, 1997, pp. 50–51.
- Valentin Lykyanin. Review of V.Pisigin's Book "Echo of Pishkin’s Line" (Валентин Лукьянин. О книге Валерия Писигина "Эхо пушкинской строки"), 1999.
- Valentin Kurbatov. Presentation of V.Pisigin's Book "Two Roads" (В.Я.Курбатов. Выступление на представлении книги "Две дороги"), 2000.
- Valentin Kurbatov. "This is Where the Sun Comes from". Review of V.Pisigin's Book "Posolon’" (Letters from Chukotka) (В.Я. Курбатов. "Откуда приходит солнце". Рецензия на книгу "Посолонь" (Письма с Чукотки)), 2001.
- Valentin Kurbatov. Foreword in V.Pisigin's book "The Coming of the Blues", Volume II (В.Я. Курбатов. Предисловие к Второму тому "Пришествие блюза"), 2010.
- Vladimir Ryzhkov. "That's Why Poland Succeeded". Review of V.Pisigin's Book "Political Conversations. Poland in 1989" (Владимир Рыжков. "Почему у поляков получилось". Рецензия на книгу Валерия Писигина "Политические беседы: Польша, 1989"), 2015.
