= Hogan Jazz Archive =

Jazz music archive in the United States

Coordinates: 29°56′22″N 90°7′16″W

Hogan Archive of New Orleans Music and New Orleans Jazz
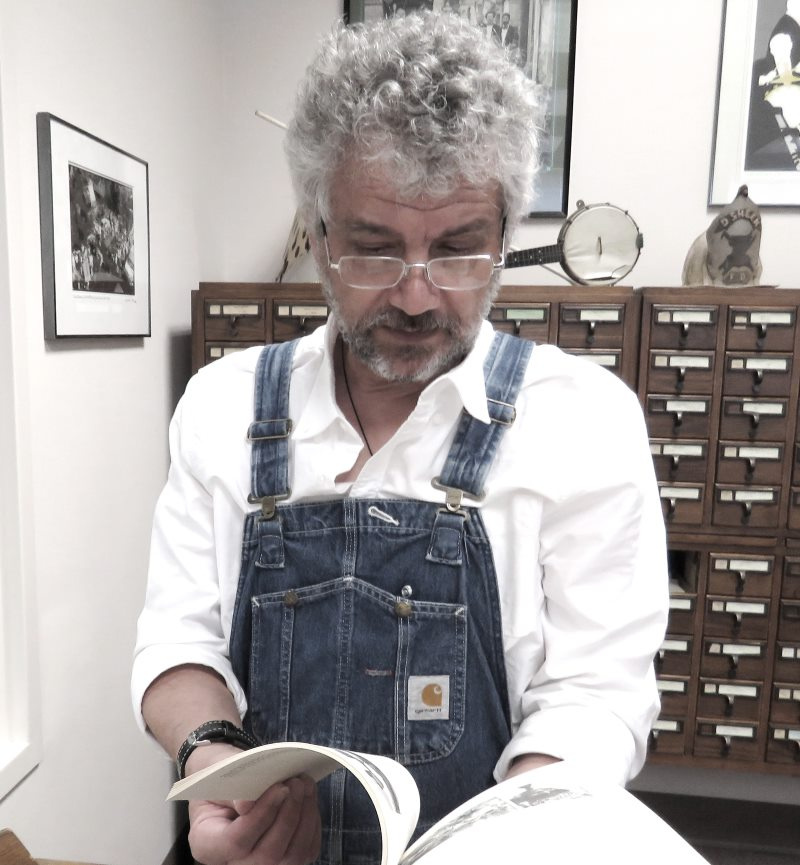
- Researcher Valeriy Pisigin at the Hogan Jazz Archive in 2016
- Location: 6801 Freret Street, Jones Hall, Tulane University, New Orleans, Louisiana 70118, United States
- Type: Research library and archive
- Established: 1958

Collection
- Items collected: Oral histories, recordings, sheet music, images, research notes
- Size: approx. 140,000 holdings as of 2009

Other information
- Website: jazz.tulane.edu

The Hogan Archive of New Orleans Music and New Orleans Jazz is an academic repository located at Tulane University in New Orleans, Louisiana. The archive specializes in Dixieland Jazz, gospel, blues, rhythm and blues, Creole songs, and related musical genres. Its collection includes oral histories, audio and video recordings, photos and other images, sheet music, personal papers, and teaching aids.

Originally named the Archive of New Orleans Jazz and later renamed the William Ransom Hogan Jazz Archive, it is often simply referred to as the Hogan Jazz Archive. As of 2001, the archive was the world's largest jazz archive, with oral histories of more than 500 musicians of the genre.

== Founding ==
In 1958, then Tulane University graduate student Richard B. "Dick" Allen started a project on the oral history of New Orleans jazz. William Ransom Hogan (1908-1971) was a professor in the history department at Tulane University from 1947 until his death in 1971. Hogan obtained grants from the Ford Foundation to develop much of the original collection at the archive and to support Allen's graduate thesis project.

Allen was adept at interviewing jazz musicians, and he emphasized musicians that were active early in the history of New Orleans-style jazz. His interviews resulted in a collection of oral histories occupying more than 2000 reels of audio tape, which form a core part of the Hogan Jazz Archive.

At the time of its founding in 1958, the original goal of the Hogan Jazz Archive was to record the history of the local form of jazz music. The original name of the archive was the "Archive of New Orleans Jazz".

== Development ==
The Department of History at Tulane University had responsibility for management of the archive until the archive was moved to Jones Hall Library of Tulane University in 1965, which houses the special collections of the Howard-Tilton Memorial Library.

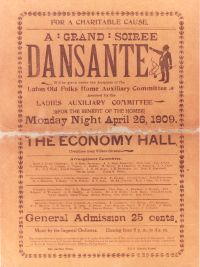
Flyer held by the Hogan Jazz Archive of the 1909 Grand Soiree Dansante at Economy Hall in New Orleans

Music historian and composer William Russell was the first curator of the Archive. He was succeeded by Richard B. "Dick" Allen served as curator of the Hogan Jazz Archive from 1965 to 1980. Allen was then succeeded by Curt Jerde, and then by Bruce Boyd Raeburn (Wikidata). In December 2019 musicologist Melissa A. Weber became curator.

Under Russell's direction as curator, the archive emphasized documenting the heritage of older jazz musicians, and so an early history of was Papa Jack Laine who had performed as early as the 1884 World Cotton Centennial. Another early musician emphasized at the outset of the oral history project was the oral history of Dominic LaRocca who in 1917 founded the Original Dixieland Jazz Band. From the beginning of the archive, it strived to document the extensive influence of African-Americans and Creoles of color in the early development of New Orleans jazz.

The scope of the archive expanded as the archive developed. By 2022, the archive's collection went beyond oral histories, to include most types of media related to documenting the people important in the musical heritage of the jazz genre, the history of the business of jazz, and the culture that surrounded the musical genre. Some areas of emphasis have included, but are not limited to: post-Civil War military music, African-American jazz funerals, African-American second-line parades, as well as Italian-American influences such as Sicilian open-air brass performances, funeral corteges, and Catholic Saints' Day processions.

Over the years, the name of the archive has changed. William Ransom Hogan died in 1971, and, in 1974, the archive was re-named the William Ransom Hogan Jazz Archive. In 2020, the name of the archive was changed to the Hogan Archive of New Orleans Music and New Orleans Jazz.

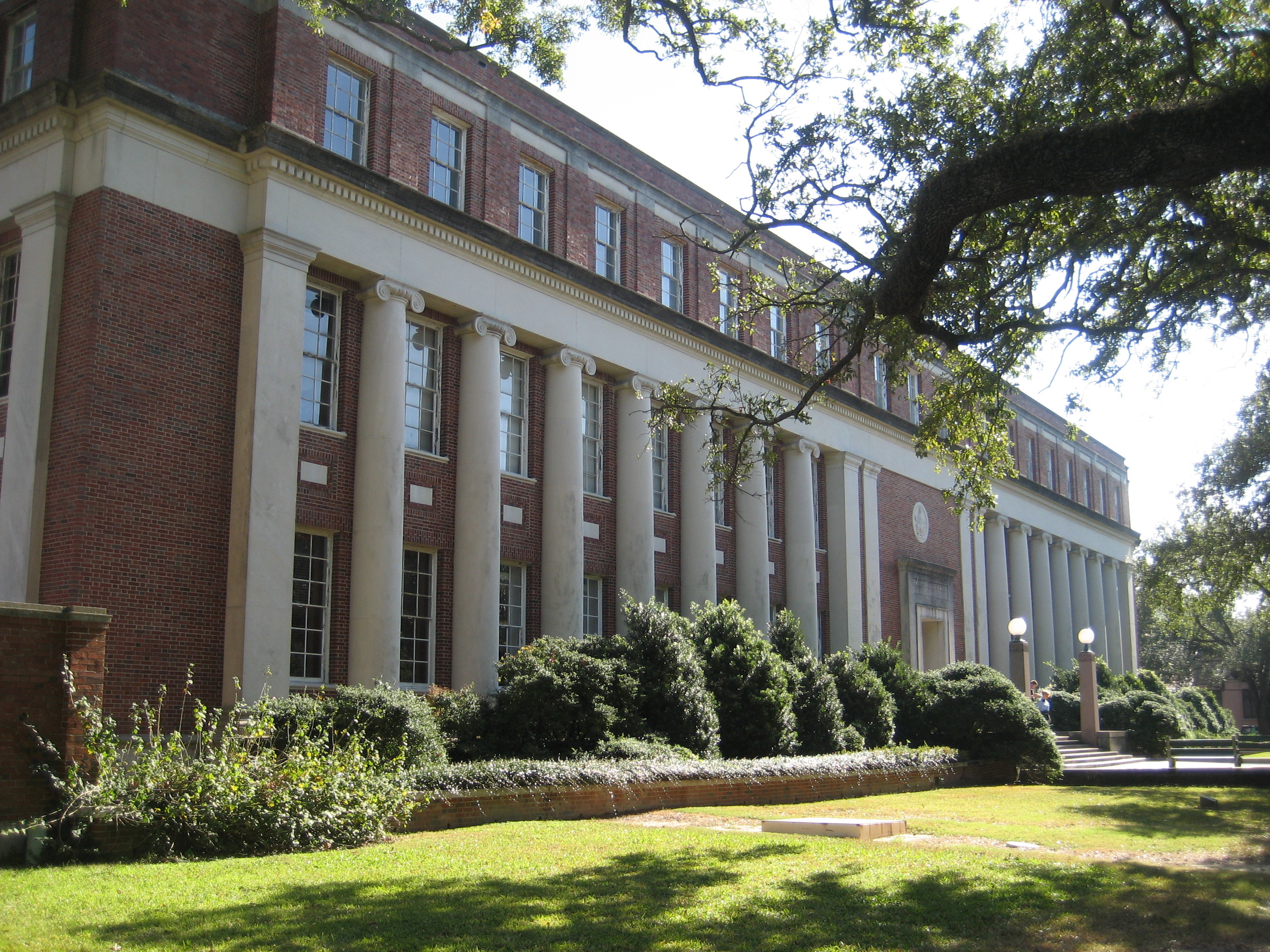
Jones Hall houses the special collections of the Howard-Tilton Memorial Library, including the Hogan Jazz Archive

Jazz musician Paul Crawford was associate curator of the archive. Music historian and jazz specialist Fred Ramsey served as a consultant to the Hogan Jazz Archive.

Through the archive's history, it has relied on donations of archival material by musicians and others active in the music industry. At times, the archive has received grants, an example being a 2006 grant from the Grammy Foundation. Grants have included financial backing to support the digitization of the archive's holdings. The archive includes a digitized sheet music collection dating to 1838.

At times, the Hogan Jazz Archive provides fellowships to visiting scholars to conduct research at the archives. These include the Louis Prima Research Fellowship and the Björn Bärnheim Research Fellowship, among others.

== Collection ==
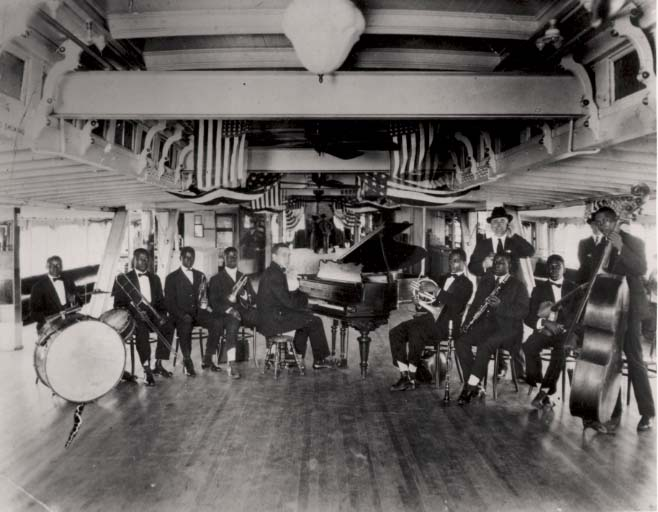
Photograph of Fate Marable's New Orleans Band on the S. S. Sidney in the early 20th century, on the Wikimedia Commons from the Hogan Jazz Archive

The collection of the Hogan Jazz Archive continued to expand through its development. As of 2009, the collection included recordings of more than 700 jazz musicians. There were approximately 80,000 jazz recordings and 60,000 sheets of early jazz music.

By early 2022, the collection of the archive included more than 2000 oral histories of jazz musicians and others important in the musical genre, these histories dating to the late 19th century. Many of these are digitized and available on-line. The collection includes sheet music covering the period 1838 to 1938, as well as rare books and thousands of photographs, ephemera, and personal papers of Jazz musicians and others involved in the art form. More recent oral histories are often in video format. The scope of the collection by that time also encompassed the full range of popular music of the New Orleans metropolitan area.

== The Jazz Archivist ==
The Hogan Jazz Archive had its own journal and newsletter, known as The Jazz Archivist, which was published from 1986 to 2019. The articles were written by members of the archive's staff and also independent music scholars. The complete set of issues of The Jazz Archivist is available on-line as of early 2022 (ISSN 1085-8415).

== See also ==
- Institute of Jazz Studies
- New Orleans Jazz Museum (collection on display at the New Orleans Mint as of 2015)
- New Orleans Jazz National Historical Park
- The Smithsonian Collection of Classic Jazz
- National Jazz Archive
- Victorian Jazz Archive
