= Michel Becquet =

- Born: 4 February 1954 (age 72); Limoges, France
- Genres: Classical
- Instrument: Trombone
- Website: www.michelbecquet.fr

Michel Becquet (born 4 February 1954 Limoges) is a French trombonist and professor at the Conservatoire de Lyon.

== Life ==
From a young age he played piano and horn, taught by his father, a professional horn player, until he turned to the trombone, aged 10. After several years of studies at the Limoges Conservatory, aged 15 he entered the Conservatoire de Paris where he quickly obtained his diploma.

He went on to win all the international contests open to his instrument (Geneva, Munich, Prague and Toulon). At 18, he became solo trombone of the Orchestre de la Suisse Romande, under the direction of Wolfgang Sawallisch, before some years later joining the orchestra of Opéra National de Paris.

In 1989 he left the Paris Opera for the Hochschule für Musik (Cologne) where he spent time teaching and composing.

In 1990 Gilbert Amy invited him to become Head of Brass at the Conservatoire National Supérieur de Musique where he directed the 18-strong ensemble Cuivres Français.

In 1991, Alexander Arutiunian dedicated his Concerto for trombone and symphony orchestra in 3 movements to Becquet.

Since then he has joined the Conservatoire de Lyon where he is Professor of Trombone and Head of Brass.

== Discography ==
=== Solo recordings ===
- 2010 (Pro Arte Musicae PAMP-1039)
- Michel Becquet et la musique de l'air - with Orchestre d'Harmonie de la Musique de l'Air; Claude Kesmaeker, conductor (DistriClassic Musique de l'air ma002)
- Trombone Recital 'Blue Bells of Scotland' (Bellwood BW-1003D)

=== Recordings as featured soloist ===
- Alla Francese: Works for Brass - with Les Cuivres Français (Arion Pierre Verany PV 793041)
- Arthur Honegger: The Chamber Music, Vol. 3 (Timpani 1C1010)
- Canzon - with Ensemble de Cuivres de Belgique; Jean-Pierre Haeck, conductor (Meister Music MM-3059)
- 50 Jahre Internationaler Musikwettbewerb der ARD München - with Symphonieorchester des Bayerichen Rundfunks; Martin Turnovsky, conductor
- Joseph & Michael Haydn: Concertos pour Trompette, Cor et Trombone - with Orchestre de Chambre National de Toulouse; Alain Moglia, conductor (Arion Pierre Verany PV 730029)
- Jost Meier - with Orchestergesellschaft Biel; Jost Meier, conductor (Musiques suisses Grammont Portrait MGB CTS-P 42–2)
- La Belle Epoque - with Thierry Caens, trumpet (Arion Pierre Verany PV 798041)
- Landowski: Concertos - with Philharmonie de Lorraine; Jacques Houtmann, conductor (Koch Schwann 311175)
- Leopold Mozart: Concertos pour Cuivres - with Les Cuivres Français; Orchestre de Chambre National de Toulouse; Alain Moglia, conductor (Arion Pierre Verany PV 730070)
- Leopold Mozart: Serenade in D - with RIAS-Sinfonietta Berlin; Ernö Sebestyen, conductor (Koch Schwann 311127)
- Luur Metalls & Friends - with Spanish Brass (Cascavelle VEL 3039)
- Marius Constant: 4 Concertos - with Orchestre symphonique de Nancy; Jérôme Kaltenbach, conductor (Erato 2292-45527-2 / 4509–94815–2)
- Masterpieces for Band 3 - with Harmonieorkest Brabants Conservatorium; Jan Cober, conductor (Molenaar Edition MBCD 31.1016.72)
- Rimsky-Korsakov - with Symphonic Band of the Belgian Guides; Norbert Nozy, conductor (Rene Gailly 87075)

=== Ensemble recordings ===
- Carmen - with Le Quatuor de Trombones de Paris (Bellwood BW-1008D) - 1996
- French Bel Canto Trombone - with Le Quatuor de Trombones de Paris and Benny Sluchin (ADDA 581247)
- Just for Fun - World Trombone Quartet with Joseph Alessi, Jörgen van Rijen, and Stefan Schulz (arcantus arc 16004) - 2016
- La Sacqueboute - with Les Saqueboutiers de Toulouse (Ambroisie AMB 9929) - 2007
- La Vie Parisienne - with Le Quatuor de Trombones de Paris (Bellwood BW-1007D) - 1992
- l'Ensemble de Trombones de Paris (Crystal Records CD 223) - 1977
- Les Quatre Virtuoses - with Le Quatuor de Trombones de Paris (Bellwood BW-1001D) - 1987
- Les Quatre Virtuoses II - with Le Quatuor de Trombones de Paris (Bellwood BW-1004D) - 1989
- Les trombonistes Antoine Courtois, Paris jouent Jean-Michel Defaye (Ligia) - 2015
- Live in Tokyo '90 - with Le Quatuor de Trombones de Paris (Bellwood BW-1005D) - 1990
- Octobone - with l'Ensemble Octobone (Octavia Records Cryston OVCC-00020) - 2005
- Octobone II - with l'Ensemble Octobone (Octavia Records Cryston OVCC-00055) - 2007
- Ragtime - with Le Quatuor de Trombones de Paris (Hérisson vert CD 6800)
- Tournée d'adieu an Japon - with Le Quatuor de Trombones de Paris (Bellwood BW-1009D)
- 20th anniversaire - with Le Quatuor de Trombones de Paris (Pluriel 9204)
