= Doc Souchon and His Milneburg Boys =

Doc Souchon and his Milneburg Boys

Studio album by Doc Souchon and his Milneburg Boys
- Released: 1969
- Recorded: late 1950s - early 1960s, New Orleans
- Genre: jazz
- Label: G.H.B.

Doc Souchon and his Milneburg Boys is an album released by Doc Souchon in 1969 by G.H.B. Records. Recording took place in New Orleans in the late 1950s or possibly the early 1960s.

== Personnel ==
- Edmond Souchon - guitar/banjo/vocals
- Armand Hug - piano
- Monk Hazel - drums
- Raymond Burke - clarinet (side 1)
- Mike Lala - trumpet (side 1)
- Chink Martin - tuba/bass
- Jack Delaney - trombone (side 1)
- Pinky Vidacovich - clarinet (side 2)
- Bill Crais - trombone (side 2)
- Sharkey Bonano - trumpet (side 2)
- Sherwood Mangipane - bass (side 2)
- Sister Elizabeth Eustis - vocal (Down by the Riverside)

== Track listing ==
1. "Since My Best Gal Turned Me Down" (Quicksell - Lodwig)
2. "That's Why I Like New Orleans" (Mares - Hug)
3. "Down by the Riverside" (trad.)
4. "Smiles" (Callahan - Roberts)
5. "You Cooked Your Goose With Me" (Armand Hug)
6. "Gone" (Andy Lockhart)
7. "I'm Heading Down South" (Joe Mares - Armand Hug)
8. "How Come You Do Me Like You Do"
9. "Angry"
