= Marcel Caens =

French trumpeter

Marcel Caens (1919 – November 2006) was a French classical trumpeter.

== Early life ==
Born in Honfleur, Caens began studying the cornet at Villedieu-les-Poêles with Michel Havard.

== Career ==
In 1937, he joined the army and met Bourvil and Louiguy (composer of La Vie en rose). He entered the Conservatoire de Paris with Eugène Foveau where he won the 2nd Prize for cornet in 1939.

From 1940 to 1943, he was a prisoner in Germany. In 1944, he won the 2nd Trumpet Prize and the First Prize in 1945.

In 1946, he was hired by the Moroccan Radio Orchestra in Rabat and at the Théâtre municipal de Casablanca where he also taught at the Conservatory. In 1954, he became a professor at the Conservatoire National de Région de Dijon as well as principal trumpet of the Orchestre du Théâtre.

Marcel Caens is violinist Maurice Caens' nephew. He is the father of trumpeter Thierry Caens, saxophonist Jean-Pierre Caens, Hervé Caens, a music teacher, and Joëlle Caens (épouse Guidot).

== Sources ==
- Article de Jean-Pierre Mathez pour le magazine international des cuivres BRASS BULLETIN No. 93 -I/1996, pages 68 to 78.
