= Joseph Alessi =

American classical trombonist (born 1959)

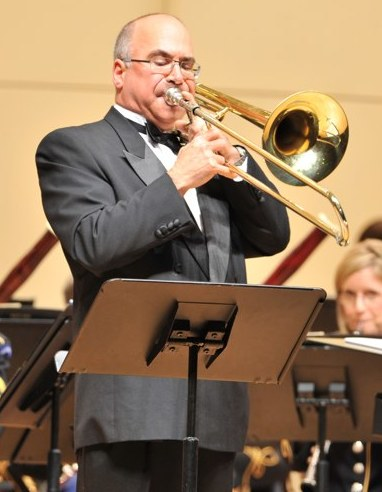

Background information
- Born: Joseph Norman Alessi; September 20, 1959 (age 67); Detroit, Michigan, U.S.
- Genres: Classical; jazz
- Occupation: Musician
- Instrument: Trombone
- Years active: 1976–present
- Member of: New York Philharmonic
- Website: josephalessi.com

Joseph Norman Alessi (born September 20, 1959) is an American classical trombonist with the New York Philharmonic. He is also on the faculty of the Juilliard School.

== Life ==
Joseph Norman Alessi was born in Detroit, Michigan and attended high school in San Rafael, California. His father, also named Joseph Alessi, was a professional trumpet player, and his mother, Maria (née Leone) sang in the Metropolitan Opera chorus. His younger brother Ralph Alessi is a jazz trumpeter. Displaying notable talent himself from an early age, Alessi graduated early from high school at age 16 and successfully auditioned to join the San Francisco Ballet Orchestra. During this time he appeared as a soloist with the San Francisco Symphony. In 1976-77, following a previously unsuccessful audition, Alessi gained entry to the Curtis Institute of Music in Philadelphia, where he studied until 1980.

== Career ==
During his third year at Curtis, Alessi joined the Philadelphia Orchestra as interim Second Trombone; he later won the job permanently and performed with the orchestra for four seasons. Following one season as principal trombone at the Montreal Symphony Orchestra, Alessi joined the New York Philharmonic as principal trombone in the spring of 1985.

Alessi made his solo debut with the New York Philharmonic in 1990 when he performed the Fantasy for Trombone by Paul Creston. In 1992, he performed with the New York Philharmonic in the world premiere of the Trombone Concerto by Christopher Rouse, which later received the 1993 Pulitzer Prize for Music. Alessi has since developed an increasingly active solo career, performing throughout the United States and internationally. His discography consists of over 14 full-length albums, in addition to guest appearances on albums by other artists. The New York Philharmonic has released recordings of the Rouse Concerto and the Colorado Symphony, featuring Alessi as soloist. His 1999 recording of Star-Child, by George Crumb, was voted Best Classical Contemporary Composition at the 43rd Grammy Awards in 2001.

Alessi joined the faculty of the Juilliard School in 1986, shortly after joining the New York Philharmonic. The Juilliard trombone studio has since furthered its international reputation as one of the most exemplary trombone college programs, and the Juilliard Trombone Choir has regularly performed with Alessi on his recording projects. Since 1999 Alessi has conducted the Alessi Seminar; a biennial trombone workshop that attracts trombonists from around the world to spend time with him in lessons, masterclasses, and recitals. Several of his past students now occupy senior positions in major orchestras throughout the world.

In recognition of Alessi's immense contributions to the trombone community, he was awarded the 2002 ITA Award, the most prestigious award offered by the International Trombone Association.

== Playing style ==
Joseph Alessi's playing is often noted for refined musicianship, an extraordinarily rich sound quality and complete technical control. The music he chooses to play is mainly romantic, classical, and modern (but mainly tonal) music, while occasionally adding in some jazz playing.

== Discography ==
=== Solo recordings ===
- Beyond the End of the Century - with Jonathan Feldman, piano (Summit Records DCD-309)
- Bone-A-Fide Brass - with Imperial Brass (Summit Records DCD-480)
- Illuminations - with the University of New Mexico Wind Symphony (Summit Records DCD-367)
- New York Legends (Cala Records CACD0508)
- Nicola Ferro: Caliente - Latin music (CD Baby)
- Return to Sorrento (Naxos Records 8.570232)
- Slide Area - with Jonathan Feldman, piano (Summit Records d'Note DCD-130) - 1992
- Slide Partners - 100 Years of American Trombone Virtuosity (Dillon Music CD004)
- Trombonastics (Summit Records DCD-314)
- Trombone Recital Tour in Japan 2011 (Pro Arte Musicae PAMP-1047)
- Visions - with Columbus State University Wind Ensemble; Robert Rumbelow, conductor (Summit Records DCD-486)

=== Recordings as featured soloist ===
- An American Celebration; Volume II - includes live recording of Rouse Concerto with the New York Philharmonic (New York Philharmonic Special Editions)
- Christopher Rouse: Gorgon - with Colorado Symphony Orchestra; Marin Alsop, conductor (RCA 09026-68410-2)
- Eric Nathan: Multitude Solitude (Albany Records TROY1586)
- Fandango - with Philip Smith, trumpet; University of New Mexico Wind Symphony (Summit Records DCD-271)
- French Wind Band Classics - with Royal Northern College of Music Wind Orchestra; Timothy Reynish, conductor (Chandos Records CHAN 9897)
- Hora Decima Brass Ensemble (Summit DCD 363)
- Maestro - with Foden's Band; Bramwell Tovey, conductor (Egon CD-SFZ136)
- Melinda Wagner: Concerto for Trombone and Orchestra; Four Settings; Wick - with New York Philharmonic; Lorin Maazel, conductor (Bridge Records 9345)
- Passaggi: Music for Wind Band - with The Hartt School Wind Ensemble; Glen Adsit, conductor (Naxos 8.572109)
- Rock Stars - with University of Florida Wind Symphony; David A. Waybright, conductor (Mark Masters 9409-MCD)
- Song of Exuberance - with Metro Brass; Charles Baker, conductor (Dillon Music DILLONCD001) - 2001
- The 66th Annual Midwest Clinic - In Honor of Our Mentors - 2012 - with Senzoku Gakuen College of Music Blue Tie Wind Ensemble; Masato Ikegami, conductor (Mark Records 50306-MCD)

=== Ensemble recordings ===
- Four of a Kind: Music for Trombone Quartet - with Blair Bollinger, Scott Hartman, and Mark Lawrence (Summit Records DCD-123) - 1991
- Four of a Kind 2: Take me out to the ball game - with Blair Bollinger, Scott Hartman, and Mark Lawrence (Summit Records DCD-345) - 2003
- Trombones Under the Tree - with Mark Lawrence, Carl Lenthe, and M. Dee Stewart (Summit Records DCD-146) - 1993
- Collage, the New York Trombone Quartet Plays! - with Edward Neumeister, James E. Pugh, and David Taylor (TNC CD 1441) - 2013
- Just for Fun - World Trombone Quartet with Michel Becquet, Jörgen van Rijen, and Stefan Schulz (arcantus arc 16004) - 2016
- Slide Monsters- with Eijiro Nakagawa, Marshall Gilkes, and Brandt Attema - 2018

=== Orchestral recordings ===
- George Crumb: 70th Birthday Album - The Complete Works, Volume 3 - with Warsaw Philharmonic Orchestra (Bridge 9095)
- Mahler: Symphonie No. 3 in d minor - with New York Philharmonic, Leonard Bernstein, conductor (Deutsche Grammophon 427 328-2)
- Charles Wuorinen: Choral Works - with Minnesota Orchestra (Koch 37336-2)
