= Emory Remington =

American trombonist (1892–1971)

- Born: December 22, 1892; Rochester, New York
- Died: December 10, 1971 (aged 78)
- Occupations: Trombonist and music teacher
- Years active: 1922-1971

Emory Brace Remington (1892–1971) was a trombonist and music teacher. He was a member of the Rochester Philharmonic Orchestra from 1923 to 1949, and on the faculty of the Eastman School of Music in Rochester, NY from 1922 until his death in 1971.

== Early life ==
Born in Rochester, New York on December 22, 1892, Remington began his musical studies in the boys' choir of an Episcopal church. His Father, Fred Remington, a brass instructor who played cornet and trumpet, presented young Remington with a trombone at the age of 14. By the age of 17 he was a member (and regular soloist) with the Rochester Park Band.

As a young trombonist, Remington studied with Gardell Simons, principal trombonist of the Philadelphia Orchestra.

In 1917 Remington joined the United States Navy and was assigned to the orchestra at a training station near Chicago. One of his bunkmates in the Navy orchestra was comedian/violinist Jack Benny whom he spoke of with admiration.

== Professional career ==
Upon returning from the Navy, Remington joined the Eastman Theater Orchestra in Rochester, also becoming a faculty member at the Eastman School of Music in 1922. His performing career was marked by tenure as principal trombonist with both the Rochester Philharmonic and the Eastman-Rochester Orchestra, an amalgamation of the philharmonic and the Eastman School of Music. He remained on faculty there for the rest of his life. As a trombone teacher, he was known to his students as "The Chief". He developed a system of legato warm-up exercises (mentioned by Donald Hunsberger in his book, The Remington Warm-Up Studies (ISBN 0-918194-10-5)).

Remington was fond of singing, and during his lessons, he would sing along with the student's trombone sound. He also encouraged his students to look for music to play that was outside of the common literature for trombone, especially music that would improve the singing characteristics of their trombone playing. His emphasis, whether in warm-up or in practice, was on relaxation and playing in a "conversational" and "singing" manner. This was quite different from the more traditional trombone methods of the time which focused on more marcato and regimented technical studies such as the Arban Method.

Another of Remington's contributions was the Eastman Trombone Choir formed in 1941. A large ensemble of trombonists would gather to play music written for multiple trombones or transcribed from other sources, such as the chorales and fugues of Johann Sebastian Bach. Separating the different musical parts (i.e. SATB: soprano, alto, tenor, bass) into sections of trombonists, and transposing the music into the proper registers for the trombone. Remington encouraged his students to transcribe music for this ensemble, amassing a large library of "new" works for it. The music of J. S. Bach became the backbone of the ensemble. Remington used this music as a tool to train his students in the art of ensemble performance.

Selected sections from his method include exercises designed around sustained long tones, security in the high register, legato tonguing, flexibility or "lip-slurs", and "pattern scales".

In 1954, Remington completed work in conjunction with C.G. Conn in developing the C.G. Conn 88H tenor trombone. The tone color and dynamic range of the instrument have made it popular amongst trombonists and contributed to its continuous production from its debut in 1954 to the present. Conn also manufactured a "Remington" tenor trombone mouthpiece which was available in either silver or gold plate. Remington encouraged his first-year students to switch to this mouthpiece, as it produced a beautiful clear sound with moderate effort. The effect of the 88H combined with the Remington mouthpiece produced a very uniform sound in the Trombone Choir and trombone sections in the large ensembles. As students progressed, they would be encouraged to switch to other mouthpieces to refine their sounds depending on performance conditions.

Remington taught at the Eastman School for 49 years, and died on December 10, 1971. On October 20, 1979, Room 310 at the Eastman School of Music was formally named the Emory B. Remington Rehearsal Room.

Remington (band) was named after Remington's son, David Remington (1926–2007). His daughter, Janet Remington was Principal Harpist with the Pittsburgh Symphony Orchestra for many years.

== Personal life ==
Remington was married to Laura W. (née Wilbur) Remington (1891–1966) a professional organist and pianist. They had three children.

== Partial list of students and their principal career positions ==
<!-Please maintain alphabetical order by surname-->

Trombonists who studied with Emory Remington at the Eastman School of Music:

- Early Anderson – Jazz artist; New York City Broadway productions and recordings
- Edwin Anderson – Cleveland Orchestra, Indiana University
- Herbert (Sonny) Ausman – Los Angeles Philharmonic, recording engineer
- Ed Bahr – Delta State University, Erie Philharmonic, Montgomery Symphony (AL), and the Great Lakes Chamber Orchestra (MI)
- Charles Baker – New Jersey Symphony Orchestra
- James Bates – U.S. Army Band arranger, National Gallery Orchestra, L.A. freelance arranger, AMTRAK troubleshooter
- Thomas Beversdorf – Indiana University, Saddler Well Ballet, Pittsburgh Symphony, Houston Symphony, Rochester Philharmonic.
- Roger Bobo – Rochester Philharmonic, Royal Concertgebouw, Los Angeles Philharmonic (Bobo studied briefly with Remington at Eastman)
- Alan Bomwell – District Manager (retired) Conn-Selmer, New York music teacher
- Fred Boyd – Syracuse Symphony Orchestra, South Carolina Philharmonic, Chautauqua Symphony (Bass Trombone & Tuba), Private Low Brass Teacher
- Robert Boyd (BM '43) – Cleveland Orchestra
- Robert Brawn –
- Ken Bruce –
- Douglas Burden (BM '75) – National Arts Centre Orchestra, McGill University, University of Ottawa, Queen's University, Capital BrassWorks
- Larry Campbell – United States Coast Guard Band (Ret.) and Louisiana State University (Ret.)
- Gordon Cherry (BM '71) – Vancouver Symphony Orchestra, CBC Radio Orchestra, University of British Columbia, National Arts Center Orchestra, Cherry Classics Music publishing
- M. Dale Clark – Rochester Philharmonic, followed Remington at principal trombone, later with Xerox
- Doug Courtright – Syracuse Symphony Orchestra
- Gregory Cox (BM '71) – Vancouver Symphony Orchestra, CBC Radio Orchestra, North Carolina Symphony, Eastern Music Festival
- Terry Cravens – University of Southern California
- Paul Crawford – New Orleans jazz musician
- Chuck Dalkert – Taught at the University of Wisconsin, University of Western Ontario and Ithaca College
- Jim Daniels – New York and Pocono Mountains freelance bass trombonist
- Tony Dechario – Rochester Philharmonic
- Bill Dengler – Rochester freelance, recording engineer
- James DeSano – Cleveland Orchestra, Oberlin Conservatory, Syracuse Symphony
- Paul Droste – Director of the Ohio State University Marching Band, founder of the Brass Band of Columbus
- Tom Eadie – Victoria Symphony, University of Western Ontario, Up With People
- Edward Erwin – New York Philharmonic, retired
- Thomas G. Everett – Taught at Harvard, New England Conservatory, Brown University, International Trombone Workshop, Indiana University Summer School, freelance with the Boston Symphony, Boston Pops, Boston Ballet
- Bob Fanning – U.S. Coast Guard Band
- David Fetter – Baltimore Symphony, Cleveland Orchestra, Peabody Conservatory
- Reginald Fink – Oklahoma City Symphony, Assistant Professor West Virginia University, Ithaca College, Ohio University
- Dr. Richard Fote – Crane School of Music of SUNY Potsdam, State College Fredonia New York, Erie Philharmonic. PA
- Bob Gillespie – New Orleans Symphony, Oklahoma City Symphony, Metropolitan Opera Orchestra, Goldman Band, National Symphony Orchestra of the South African Broadcasting Corporation (1974–2000), West Point Band
- Dennis Good – Nashville Symphony Orchestra
- Gary Good – Music administration
- Robert Gray (MM '50, DMA '57) – University of Illinois
- Gary Greenhoe – Milwaukee Symphony Orchestra, North Carolina Symphony manufacturer: Greenhoe trombones
- Paul Gregory –
- Lewis Van Haney – New York Philharmonic, Indiana University
- Wesley Hanson – Ball State University
- Bill Harris – Syracuse Symphony
- David Hart – North Carolina Symphony
- Charles (Chick) Herman – Principal Trombone Atlanta Wind Symphony, taught public school music
- Nelson Hinds –
- Dr. Neill Humfeld – East Texas State University
- Dr. Donald Hunsberger – Eastman Wind Ensemble Music Director
- Hal Janks – Metropolitan Opera Orchestra
- Robert Jones – Rochester Philharmonic, followed M. Dale Clark
- Bob Kalwas – Public school music teacher, freelance Rochester New York
- David Kanter – Symphony of the Potomac
- Simon Karasick (BM '33) – Mannes College of Music, NYC freelance
- Jeremy Kempton – Band Director at North Shore High School NJ, music director of the Island Chamber Symphony, Brooklyn Symphony Orchestra, Massapequa Philharmonic
- Don King – Kennedy Center Opera House Orchestra, National Ballet Orchestra
- Dale Kirkland – Freelance artist, Buddy Rich band
- William Peter Kline – Teaches music theory, music appreciation, low brass, and directs the brass ensemble at San Antonio College
- Donald Knaub – Rochester Philharmonic, Eastman School of Music faculty, Professor of Trombone at the University of Texas at Austin
- Kenneth Knowles – Memorial University Newfoundland Canada
- Stephen Kohlbacher – San Francisco Bay Area Freelance tenor trombonist
- Joseph Lalumia – Director of Orchestras, Bridgewater-Raritan High School, New Jersey (1980–2015) retired.
- Bob Leech –
- Lance Lehmberg – Freelance Rochester New York
- Lester Lehr –
- Dick Lieb – New York recording artist, composer
- Art Linsner – Chicago Freelance bass trombonist
- Harry Lockwood –
- Ernest Lyon (MA '38) – University of Louisville
- Robert Marsteller – Los Angeles Philharmonic, U. of Southern California
- Jim Martin – North Carolina Symphony
- Patrick McCarty – Composer, arranger
- William McCauley – Composer, conductor, arranger, Director Seneca College, North York Symphony Orchestra conductor
- Byron McCulloh (BM '49, MM '51) – Pittsburgh Symphony
- John McMurray –
- Dominick (Meco) Monardo – NYC freelance Broadway artist, pop music arranger
- Donald Miller – Buffalo Philharmonic, founder of Ensemble Music
- Robert E. Moran – United States Navy Dance Band, Monroe County (NY) Parks Band, Union Musician, RCSD Music Teacher
- Audrey Morrison – soloist, freelance artist
- Richard Myers – Buffalo Philharmonic, arranger
- Mark Narins – San Francisco area conductor and composer
- George Osborn – Rochester Philharmonic, faculty Eastman School of Music
- Allen Ostrander – bass trombone: National Symphony, NBC Orchestra, Pittsburgh Symphony, New York Philharmonic
- Alvin Parris – Minister and Gospel Choir Director, Rochester NY
- Porter Poindexter – New York freelance artist, Broadway performer, recording artist
- Raymond Premru – Philharmonia Orchestra (London), Oberlin Conservatory, Philip Jones Brass Ensemble
- Bernard O. (Bernie) Pressler – Ball State University
- James E. Pugh – New York recording artist, University of Illinois
- Gordon Pulis (BM '35) – New York Philharmonic, Philadelphia Orchestra, Toronto Symphony, Metropolitan Opera Orchestra
- J. Richard Raum – Regina Symphony Orchestra, University of Regina
- Bill Reichenbach Jr. – Los Angeles studio trombonist, soloist, arranger, composer
- Dave Richey – Rochester Philharmonic
- Janice Robinson – NYC recording and freelance performer, educator, composer and consultant in jazz, popular, modern and classics
- Jim Robinson – Choral conductor, SF Bay Area. UNLV Community Band
- Henry Romersa – formerly Peabody College, founder of the International Trombone Workshop (now Festival)
- Dr. William Runyan – musicologist, conductor, and low brass teacher in Colorado
- John Russo – Jazz Artist, North Carolina Symphony Bass Trombone
- Bob Saine – Recording engineer
- Dr. Russ Schultz – Memphis Symphony Orchestra, Central Washington University, Dean of Fine arts at Lamar University
- Ralph Sauer – Los Angeles Philharmonic, Toronto Symphony
- Howard Scheib – California Army National Guard 59th Army Band, U. S. Army Reserve 91st Division Band (retired)
- Jim Shake –
- Merrill Sherburn – Professor of Trombone, Michigan State University, Lansing Symphony
- Stanley Shumway – Arranger
- Ron Stanton – Adjunct Professor of Brass at Long Island University, Freelance New York City Bass Trombone artist, Public High School Band program
- Rick Starnes – Conductor, Birmingham Community Concert Band
- Harold Steiman – Pittsburgh Symphony
- David Stout – Freelance Los Angeles artist, toured with Clyde McCoy
- Pete Vivona – Northern Arizona University
- Dr. Irvin Wagner – Oklahoma City Philharmonic, University of Oklahoma
- Norm Wilcox – arranger and principal trombonist of the Finger Lakes Orchestra, Elmira Orchestra
- Elwood Williams – San Francisco Ballet, Williams Music Publishing
- Jim Willis – Author, professor of low brass at Daytona Beach College
- Anne Witherell – Private Trombone Teacher, Stanford University
- John Witmer – Freelance western New York trombonist. Taught all levels of instrumental music in public schools and adjunct professor at Niagara County Community College
- Robert Wrasman – 2nd Trombonist Rochester Philharmonic Orchestra 1950's
- Ray Wright (BM '43) – Glenn Miller Orchestra, Co-director Radio City Music Hall, Professor of Jazz Studies at Eastman School of Music
- Larry Yagodzinski –
- Dorothy Ziegler – National Symphony Orchestra, St. Louis Symphony, Indiana University

== Sources ==
- The Remington Warm-Up Studies, prepared and edited by Donald Hunsberger (ISBN 0-918194-10-5)
- Douglas Yeo's website has some quotes about Remington:
- The International Trombone Association has a small history and award in his name:
- Biography at Eastman School of Music
