= Paul Crawford (jazz musician) =

Jazz musician and music historian

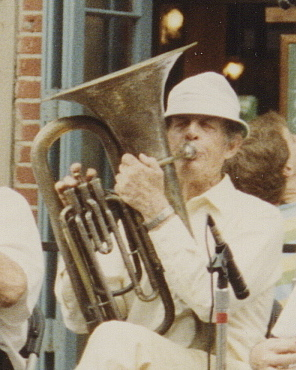

Background information
- Born: February 16, 1925; Atmore, Alabama USA
- Died: July 31, 1996 (aged 71) New Orleans, Louisiana USA
- Genres: Jazz
- Occupations: Jazz musician Music historian
- Instruments: Trombone, Baritone horn

Paul Crawford (1925 - 1996) was an American jazz musician, music arranger, and music historian. He specialized in Dixieland jazz.

== Early life and education ==
Crawford was born in Atmore, Alabama, to parents who were a Baptist minister and a music teacher. He served in the U.S. Navy during World War II and was stationed in Wilmington, North Carolina.

Crawford graduated from the Eastman School of Music in Rochester, New York, USA, where he studied trombone in a classical style. He studied under trombonist and teacher Emory Remington. Crawford also pursued for a time graduate studies at the University of Alabama. He then moved to New Orleans in 1951, at which time he became a specialist in the Dixieland style of Jazz.

== Career as a performer ==
Crawford initially took up residence in the French Quarter of New Orleans where he became acquainted with people in the local arts and music scene. These included jazz historian Dick Allen and artist Johnny Donnels. He also started performing at the New Orleans Jazz Club. Crawford learned the Dixieland Jazz genre through these personal connections and experiences.

Soon after his arrival in New Orleans, Crawford became co-bandleader of the Crawford-Ferguson Night Owls, with Leonard Ferguson. The band frequently performed on the steamboat President. He made his first recordings in 1957 with the Lakefront Loungers. During this time, Crawford's principal musical instrument was the trombone. Many of his gigs at that time were non-paying. Crawford participated in jam sessions at the New Orleans Jazz Club. He also performed at times with Sharkey Bonano. He obtained a regular paying position with bandleader Paul "Doc" Evans.

In the 1950s, various laws being enforced in the Deep South prohibited white musicians from performing with African-American musicians. As these laws were struck down in the 1960s, opportunities opened up for Crawford to perform with various notable jazz musicians in New Orleans who were of African-American ethnicity. In 1964, Crawford was approached by Allan Jaffe, who was the owner of Preservation Hall, about performing at the Preservation Hall venue. With Punch Miller, he became a part of the Preservation Hall Jazz Band.

Shortly thereafter, Crawford became a part of the Olympia Brass Band. His tenure with the Olympia Brass Band included three European tours. Crawford marched in many New Orleans Jazz Funerals as a member of the Olympia Brass Band, often marching just behind Matthew "Fats" Houston, who served as grand marshal of the band. Although trained with the trombone as his instrument, Crawford often performed with the baritone horn.

Crawford was a founding member of the New Orleans Ragtime Orchestra. As a member of this group and others, he helped make the soundtrack for the movies "Pretty Baby" and "Live and Let Die", as well as many other recording sessions. Crawford played the baritone horn in many performances of the musical "One Mo' Time".

With various bands, Crawford performed at the New Orleans Jazz and Heritage Festival a significant number of times, occasionally with several acts in the course of a single day.

== Career as a music historian ==
Crawford was an associate curator at the Tulane University Hogan Jazz Archive. As curator, conducted numerous interviews for an oral history of jazz.

In this role, Crawford resurrected many forgotten pieces of jazz music and developed arrangements of them. He also developed a significant number of photos of jazz musicians and performances, in a private collection.

== Personal life ==
Crawford's wife's given name was Mary, and they had three children including first-born Elyse, daughter Amy, and Crawford's stepson Samuel Charters. He resided on Joliet Street in New Orleans much of the latter part of his life. He acquired a significant collection of jazz recordings, including of artists that he personally knew or performed with.

Crawford died in July 1996 of lung cancer. He had been living in a skilled nursing facility at the time of his death.
