= Megumi Kanda =

Japanese trombonist (born 1975)

- 神田めぐみ
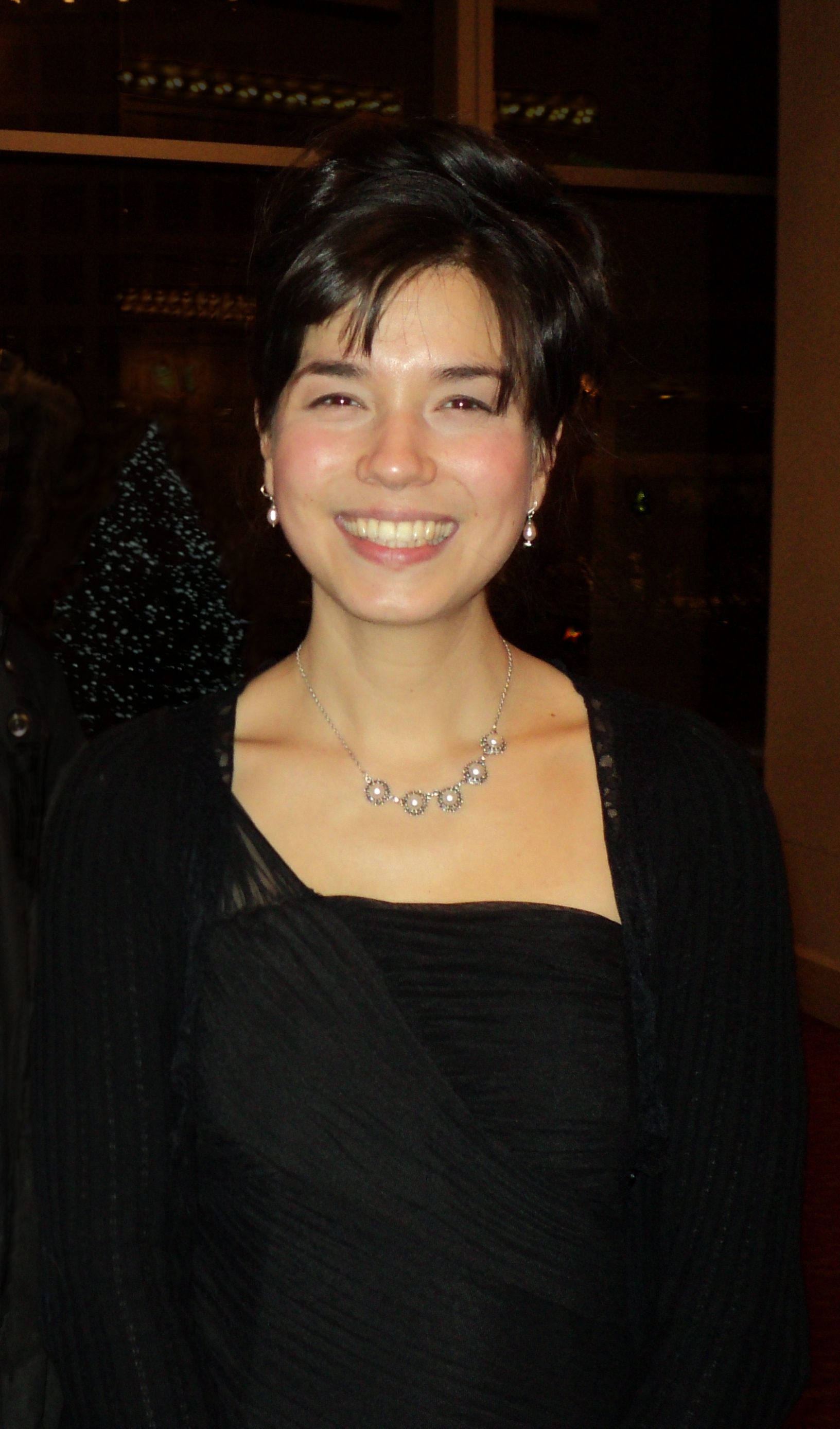
- Megumi Kanda after an MSO performance in 2011
- Born: November 9, 1975 (age 50); Tokyo, Japan
- Education: Cleveland Institute of Music
- Occupation: Musician
- Years active: 1997 – present
- Organization: MSO
- Spouse: Dietrich Hemann
- Children: 3

Megumi Kanda (神田めぐみ) (born November 9, 1975) is a Japanese trombonist.

== Early life ==
Kanda began playing trombone at the age of 10 in Tokyo, Japan. She attended the Toho High School of Music, where she won first prize in a Japanese national competition. After high school, she moved to the United States and earned a Bachelor of Music from the Cleveland Institute of Music where she studied with James DeSano, principal trombone of the Cleveland Orchestra. She was first hired as a professional trombonist by the Albany Symphony Orchestra in 1997, and then worked for the Rochester Philharmonic. From 2004 to 2008, she served on the board of directors for the International Trombone Association.

== Career ==
Kanda is currently the principal trombonist with the Milwaukee Symphony Orchestra (MSO) in Milwaukee, Wisconsin, a position she won in 2002 (out of a field of 76 applicants for the position, only seven of whom were female). Andreas Delfs was the music director of the MSO at the time.

Megumi Kanda is a Greenhoe Trombones Artist and Clinician. The Greenhoe Trombones company was founded by her (retired) colleague in the Milwaukee Symphony Orchestra, Gary Greenhoe. Kanda plays a Greenhoe GC4-1R Tenor Trombone.

== Important performances ==
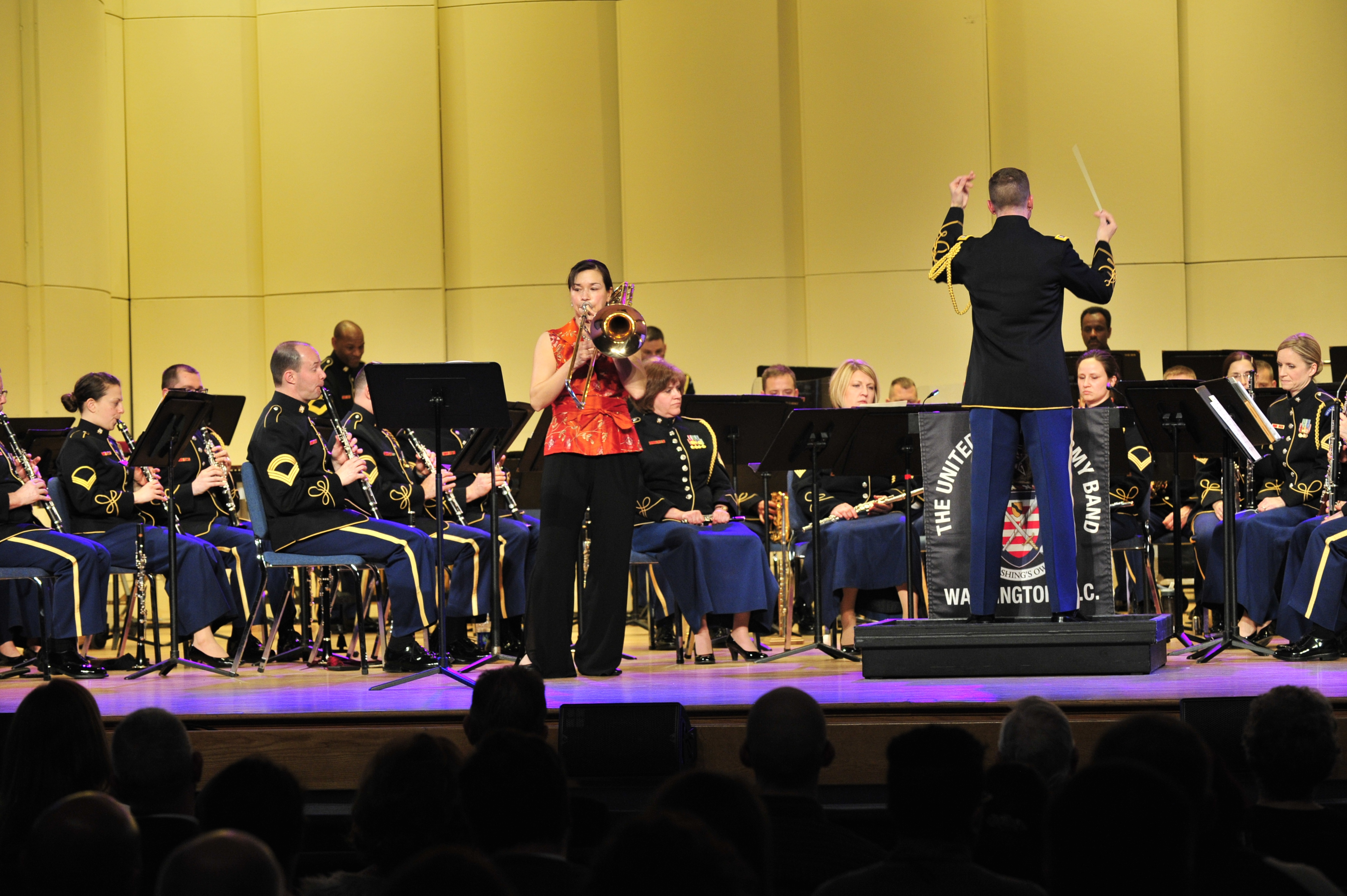
Megumi Kanda performing Amy Mills’ Red Dragonfly with the United States Army Band.

Kanda has performed as a featured soloist with the following ensembles: Milwaukee Symphony Orchestra, Pershing's Own Army Band, the US Army Field Band, and the Prague Chamber Orchestra.

Kanda has also appeared as a soloist at the International Trombone Festival, American Trombone Workshop, and countless other festivals.

Kanda has premiered works that were written for her by the composers Amy Mills, Bruce Stark, and Geoffrey Gordon.

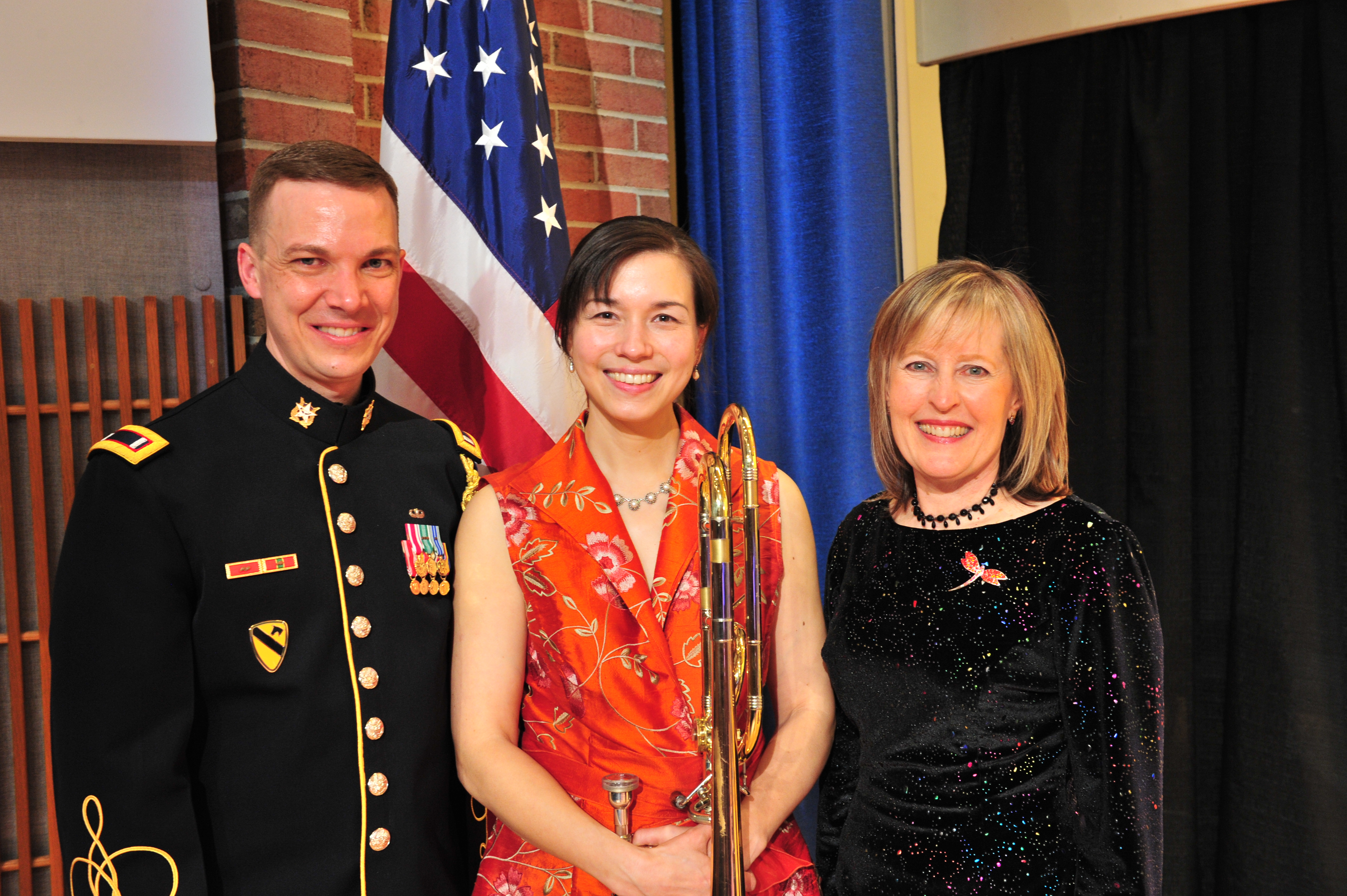
Megumi Kanda with conductor 1LT Joel DuBois and composer Amy Mills.

== Books ==
Kanda has published two trombone method books, The One Hundred (2015), and Trombone Unlimited (2020). Her first book, The One Hundred, is an extensive book of common trombone excerpts. She also includes her own commentary on these excerpts. Her second, and most recent book, Trombone Unlimited, is a detailed method book that aids in technical and musical studies.

== Teaching ==
Kanda has served as a guest faculty member at music institutions including the New World Symphony, National Youth Orchestra, Interlochen Arts Academy, and many more. She has also served as a faculty member at the Eastman School of Music Community Education Division.

== Personal life ==
Kanda is married to Dietrich Hemann, with whom she has three children.

== Awards and recognition ==
- Consul General of Japan at Chicago — Certificate of Commendation, recognized for her contribution to the friendship between the United States and Japan
- Arion Foundation (Tokyo, Japan) — 2006 Recognition as one of the most influential Japanese classical artists
- Milwaukee Business Journal — 2017 Woman of Influence, Education Leadership
- International Trombone Association — 2020 International Trombone Association Award

== Discography ==
Kanda has released three solo albums: Amazing Grace, Gloria, and Mona Lisa.

Kanda is featured on the following albums (all tracks of each album, unless otherwise noted).

Release date	Album	Label	Notes
2 December 2002	Amazing Grace	JVC Victor	originally released in Japan
24 March 2004	Amazing Grace	Victor	apparently same tracks released on DVD audio in Japan
29 June 2004	Amazing Grace	Albany Records	re-released in US
21 May 2003	Mirai: Brilliantly Classical Young Maestros of Our Time	Victor	released in Japan (Kanda is only featured on track 16)
23 September 2003	Gloria	Victor	originally released in Japan
31 August 2004	Gloria	Albany Records	re-released in the US
1 November 2004	Mona Lisa	Victor	released in Japan
22 June 2005	Best of Ave Maria	Victor	released in Japan (Kanda is only featured on track 5)
21 April 2006	Magnifique Live	Victor	released in Japan recorded live (3 September 2005) at Tokyo Opera City Concert Hall (Kanda is only featured on tracks 7, 9, and 13)
