= Dorothy Ziegler =

American musician

- Dorothy Ziegler, from a 1963 newspaper
- Born: Dorothy Miriam Ziegler; July 20, 1922; Muscatine, Iowa
- Died: March 1, 1972 (aged 49); South Miami, Florida
- Occupation(s): Musician, music educator, conductor, vocal coach

Dorothy Ziegler (July 20, 1922 – March 1, 1972) was an American musician, a trombonist with the St. Louis Symphony Orchestra. She also taught piano at St. Louis Institute of Music, and conducted operas.

== Early life and education ==
Dorothy Miriam Ziegler was born in Muscatine, Iowa, the daughter of Elmer Ziegler and Wilma Busch Ziegler. Her parents and brother were also musicians. In 1940, she toured South America and the Caribbean in the All-America Youth Orchestra, conducted by Leopold Stokowski. In 1943, she graduated from the Eastman School of Music, where she studied with Emory Remington.

In 1946 Ziegler earned a master's degree in piano from the University of Southern California. 1947 she went to France for a summer of piano studies with Robert Casadesus and Gaby Casadesus. She attended the Juilliard Institute for Opera Conductors in 1957, and studied conducting with Nadia Boulanger, Felix Waldman, Max Rudolph, and Boris Goldovsky.

== Career ==
Ziegler played trombone at the Hollywood Bowl, in the National Symphony under Hans Kindler, and in the Tanglewood Music Center Orchestra, conducted by Serge Koussevitsky. She was first trombone with the St. Louis Symphony Orchestra from 1944 to 1958. At the time of her hiring, she was one of the only women trombonists performing with a major American orchestra. She also taught piano at the St. Louis Institute of Music, worked in a music therapy program, and was full-time conductor of the Kirkwood Symphony in Illinois.

From 1955 to 1964 she was director of the St. Louis Grand Opera Guild. She led the guild in bringing adapted opera productions to high school and college audiences. From 1964 to 1966 she conducted for the Indiana University Opera Theater. From 1966 to 1971, she was director of the University of Miami Opera Theater. In her Florida years, she played principal trombone with the Miami Beach Symphony and the Fort Lauderdale Symphony.

In 1962, Ziegler's recording Your Rehearsal Accompanist was produced by her St. Louis colleague, trumpeter Robert Weatherly. In 1970, she accompanied three opera contestants at the International Tchaikovsky Competition in Moscow.

== Personal life ==
Ziegler died from cancer in 1972, aged 49 years, in a hospital in South Miami, Florida. In 2012, she was honored as a Brasswoman Pioneer at the International Women's Brass Conference meeting in Kalamazoo, Michigan.

Donald H. White's Tetra Ergon (1972), a composition for bass trombone and piano, features a movement titled "In Memory of Dottie", in memory of Dorothy Ziegler.
