= Jörgen van Rijen =

Dutch classical trombonist (born 1975)

- Born: February 20, 1975 (age 51); Dordrecht, Netherlands
- Genres: Classical
- Occupation: Trombonist
- Instrument: Trombone
- Years active: 1997-present
- Website: http://www.jorgenvanrijen.com/

Jörgen van Rijen (born 20 February 1975, Dordrecht) is Principal Trombone (jointly with Bart Claessens) at the Royal Concertgebouw Orchestra (RCO) in Amsterdam. He is also a founding member of the Dutch trombone ensemble, New Trombone Collective, and Professor of Trombone at the Amsterdam Conservatory.

== Biography ==
Jörgen van Rijen started playing trombone at age 8, and at the age of 16 began studying at the Rotterdam Conservatory under George Wiegel. During his studies, Jörgen spent three months studying with Michel Becquet, solo trombonist and teacher at the Conservatoire National Supérieur de Musique de Lyon, where he also studied baroque trombone with Daniel Lassalle. After briefly playing principal trombone with the Rotterdam Philharmonic Orchestra, he joined the Royal Concertgebouw Orchestra in the same position in 1997.

In March 2001 van Rijen made his solo debut with the Royal Concertgebouw Orchestra performing Henri Tomasi's trombone concerto. A recording of this performance was released on van Rijen's first solo album on Channel Classics Records in March 2005.

Since 2003 he has been a founder and leading member of the New Trombone Collective. Based in the Netherlands, the group has so far released three CD recordings and been invited to perform throughout the world.

In 2006 van Rijen received a Borletti Buitoni Trust Award which has allowed him to commission new works from composers such as Kalevi Aho, and to make a series of recordings.

In 2007 Dutch composer Theo Verbey was commissioned by the Royal Concertgebouw Orchestra to write a trombone concerto with Jörgen van Rijen as soloist. The premiere performance of the new work, LIED, was given in September 2007, and released on RCO's own record label, RCO Live.

A frequent guest soloist with a number of orchestras, van Rijen was also invited to perform for several months in 2014 as a member of the trombone section of the New York Philharmonic. He has also performed for several seasons as principal trombonist with the Lucerne Festival Orchestra.

On April 20, 2017, van Rijen premiered James MacMillan's Trombone Concerto with the RCO conducted by Iván Fischer.

van Rijen is an endorsing artist for Antoine Courtois trombones.

== Awards ==
- 1994 - first prize, National Soloist Contest for young music talents
- 1997 - first prize, Holiday-Inn/ClassicFM Competition
- 1999 - first prize, International Trombone Competition, Guebwiller, France
- 2001 - first prize, International Trombone Competition, Toulon, France
- 2004 - awarded the Netherlands Music Prize, the highest distinction awarded by the Dutch Ministry of Culture
- Also laureate of the International Brass Competition of Nizhny Novgorod, Russia

== Discography ==
=== Solo recordings ===
- First Chairs of the Concertgebouw Orchestra, Vol. 1 (Channel Classics CCS SA 22305) - 2005
- Sackbutt - Trombone in the 17th and 18th Century (Channel Classics CCS SA 26708) - 2008
- I was like WOW! (Channel Classics CCS SA 26909) - 2009

=== Recordings as featured soloist ===
- WMC 1997: The Winning Concert - Royal Dutch Windorchestra of Thorn (World Wind Music WWM 500.033) - 1998
- In Concert: Fanfare Orchestra of the Netherlands (MuziekGroep Nederland NM EXTRA 98022) - 2001
- The Golden City - The Music of Jan Bosveld (Gobelin Music 04.002) - 2004
- Brass a la Carte - Brassband Rijnmond (MBCD 31.1079.72) - 2005
- Horizon 1 - Premieres 2007 - Royal Concertgebouw Orchestra (RCO Live RCO 08003) - 2008
  - contains Theo Verbey's "LIED" for trombone and orchestra
- Mythic Themes for Symphonic Windorchestra (World Wind MusicWWM 500.152) - 2008
- Haydn: Concertos for Horn - Jasper de Waal, horn (Channel Classics CCS SA 30210) - 2010
- Horizon 4 - Royal Concertgebouw Orchestra (RCO Live RCO 11001) - 2011
  - contains Luciano Berio's "SOLO" for trombone and orchestra
- Tintomara - Wim van Hasselt, trumpet (Channel Classics CCS SA 36315) - 2015
- Harald Genzmer: Concertos (Capriccio C5330) - 2017
- Horizon 8 - Royal Concertgebouw Orchestra (RCO Live) - 2018
  - contains James McMillan's Trombone Concerto

=== Ensemble recordings ===
- Collective - New Trombone Collective (Etcetera KTC 1354) - 2003
- Trombone - New Trombone Collective (Etcetera KTC 1284) - 2005
- Brass - Royal Concertgebouw Orchestra (RCO Live RCO 07002) - 2007
- New - New Trombone Collective (Etcetera KTC 1353) - 2007
- Niels Marthinsen: Snapshot Symphony (DaCapo 8.226545) - 2011
- Brass Too - Royal Concertgebouw Orchestra (RCO Live RCO 14010) - 2014
- Just for Fun - World Trombone Quartet with Joseph Alessi, Michel Becquet, and Stefan Schulz (arcantus arc 16004) - 2016
- Pitch Black - Brass United (Channel Classics CCS SA 38717) - 2017
