= James DeSano =

James DeSano is a retired orchestral trombonist. He served as associate principal trombone of the Cleveland Orchestra from 1970 to 1989 and as principal trombone from 1989 to his retirement in 2003. As a soloist with the Cleveland Orchestra, he performed Henri Tomasi's Trombone Concerto. Prior to his tenure in Cleveland, DeSano was principal trombone of the Syracuse Symphony Orchestra from 1964 to 1970.

== Education ==
DeSano attended the Eastman School of Music as a graduate student, where he studied with Emory Remington. He received his bachelor's degree in music education from Ithaca College.

== Teaching ==
DeSano was Professor of Trombone at the Oberlin Conservatory of Music from 1999 to 2013. During his time with the Cleveland Orchestra, he taught at the Cleveland Institute of Music. He has also served on the faculties of Kent State University, Syracuse University, and the University of Akron.

Notable pupils include Megumi Kanda, principal trombone of the Milwaukee Symphony Orchestra, James Box, principal trombone of the Montreal Symphony Orchestra, and Jeremy Buckler of the Atlanta Symphony Orchestra

== Recordings ==
- Brahms' Complete Symphonies, Vladimir Ashkenazy
- Schumann's 3rd and 4th Symphonies, Christoph von Dohnanyi
- Ravel's Boléro, Christoph von Dohnanyi
- Mahler's Symphony No. 7, Pierre Boulez
- Stravinsky's The Rite of Spring, Pierre Boulez
- Shostakovich's Symphony No. 15, Kurt Sanderling

DeSano can also be heard in many Telarc recordings under the baton of Lorin Maazel.
