= Robert Marsteller =

American musician

Robert Loren Marsteller (1918–1975) was a prominent American symphonic trombonist and music educator.

He went to the Eastman School of Music, where he studied under Emory Remington. Marsteller was the first trombonist with the National Symphony Orchestra, performed in a Navy Band during World War II, and then served as principal trombonist for 25 years with the Los Angeles Philharmonic Orchestra and the Hollywood Bowl Orchestra. He was a member of the faculty of the University of Southern California from 1946 until his death. He premiered many major works, including the Paul Creston Fantasy for Trombone and Orchestra (commissioned for him by Alfred Wallenstein and the Los Angeles Philharmonic Orchestra and first performed in 1948) and Sonata by Halsey Stevens (1967). Like Remington, Marsteller was a master teacher, and many of his students hold chairs in major symphony orchestras around the country and in Europe.
