= New Orleans Jazz Museum =

Music museum in New Orleans, Louisiana

Coordinates: 29.9612°N 90.0578°W

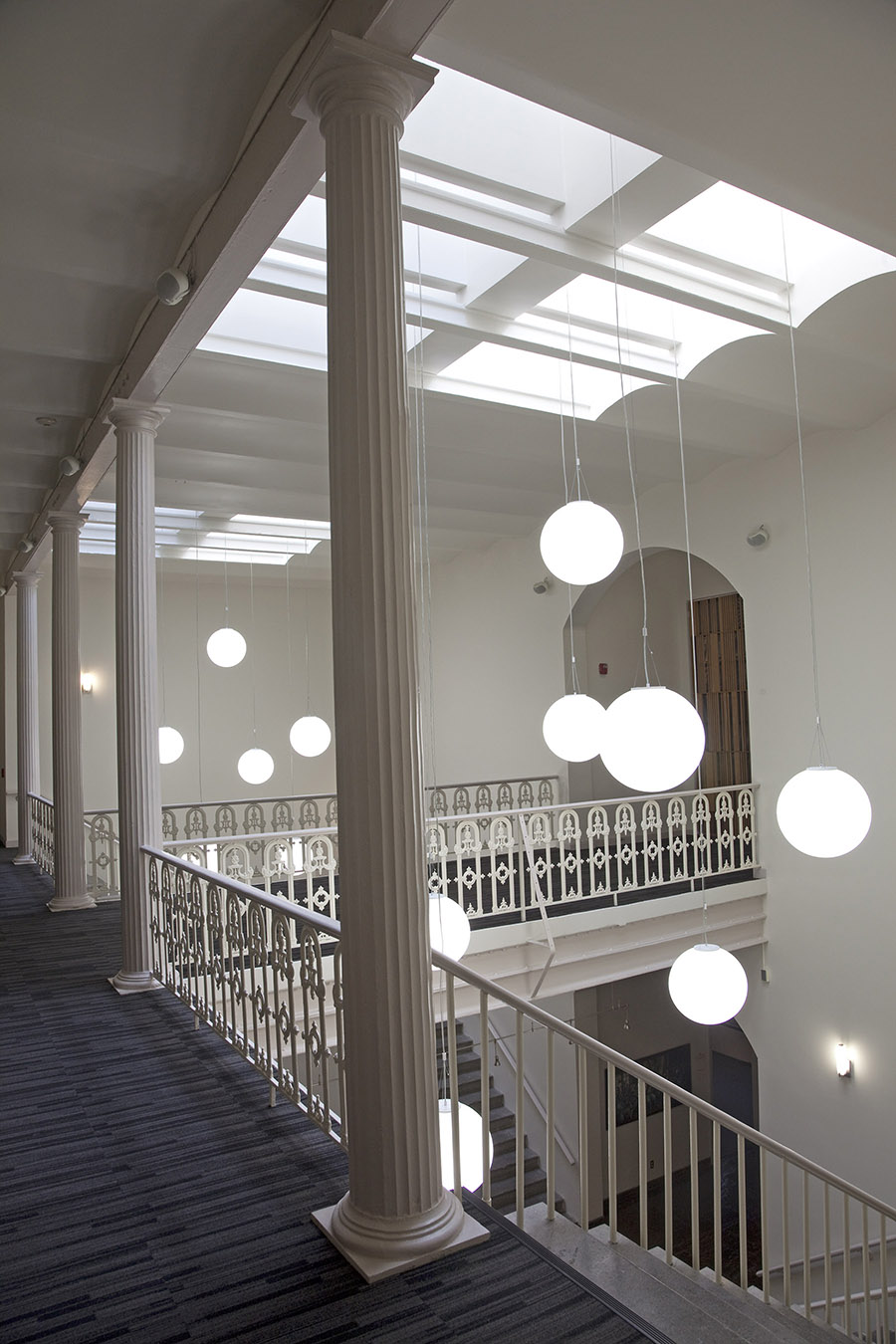
- Established: 1961
- Location: 400 Esplanade Avenue; New Orleans, Louisiana 70116
- Type: Jazz music
- Founders: Doc Souchon, Danny Barker
- Owner: Louisiana State Museum
- Public transit access: 49 French Market
- Website: nolajazzmuseum.org

The New Orleans Jazz Museum is a music museum in New Orleans, Louisiana, U.S., dedicated to preserving and celebrating the history of jazz music. Originally a separate museum, the collection is now affiliated with the Louisiana State Museum. The New Orleans Jazz Museum is located in the Old U.S. Mint building on 400 Esplanade Avenue, bordering the historic French Quarter neighborhood.

== History ==
Plans for a museum commemorating New Orleans jazz began in the 1950s by a collaborative group of New Orleans jazz collectors and enthusiasts of the New Orleans Jazz Club, which was founded in 1948. Key movers were Edmond "Doc" Souchon, Myra Menville, and Helen Arlt. The museum opened in 1961, at 1017 Dumaine Street in the French Quarter, with Clay Watson as curator. Though the collection has since moved, the original location is maintained today as part of the Hotel St. Pierre, including commemorative plaques on the property.

In 1969, the museum relocated to the Royal Sonesta Hotel. In the early 1970s, the Sonesta changed ownership, and the museum subsequently relocated to 833 Conti Street in 1973. Soon after its relocation, the museum closed again due to bankruptcy. On September 15, 1977, the entire collection of the New Orleans Jazz Museum was donated to the people of Louisiana and became The New Orleans Jazz Club Collections of the Louisiana State Museum. In the early 1980s, the Louisiana State Museum's Jazz Collection exhibit opened on the second floor of the Old U.S. Mint building under the curatorship of Don Marquis. The New Orleans Jazz Museum now resides permanently at the Old U.S. Mint.

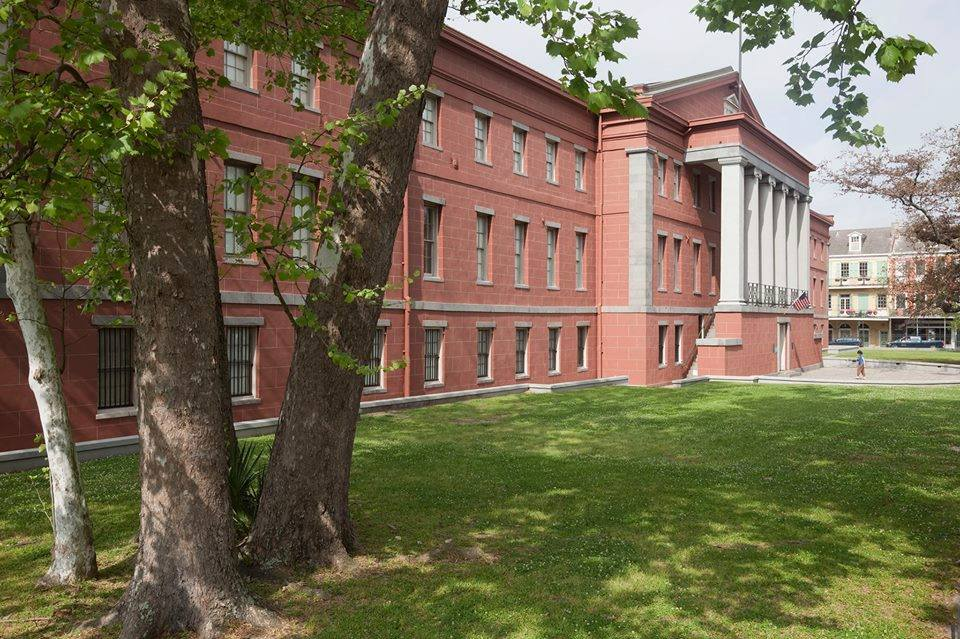
The facade of the Old U.S. Mint building as viewed from Esplanade Avenue. This is the current location of the New Orleans Jazz Museum.

In 2005, both the U.S. Mint and the jazz collection sustained damage during Hurricane Katrina. The New Orleans Jazz Museum collections have been displayed in a number of exhibits since the Mint reopened in 2008. In 2015, efforts were underway to transform most of the Mint building into the New Orleans Jazz Museum.

The mission of The New Orleans Jazz Museum is to celebrate the history of jazz in the city it was born in through interactive exhibits, educational programming, research facilities, and musical performances.

== Current use ==
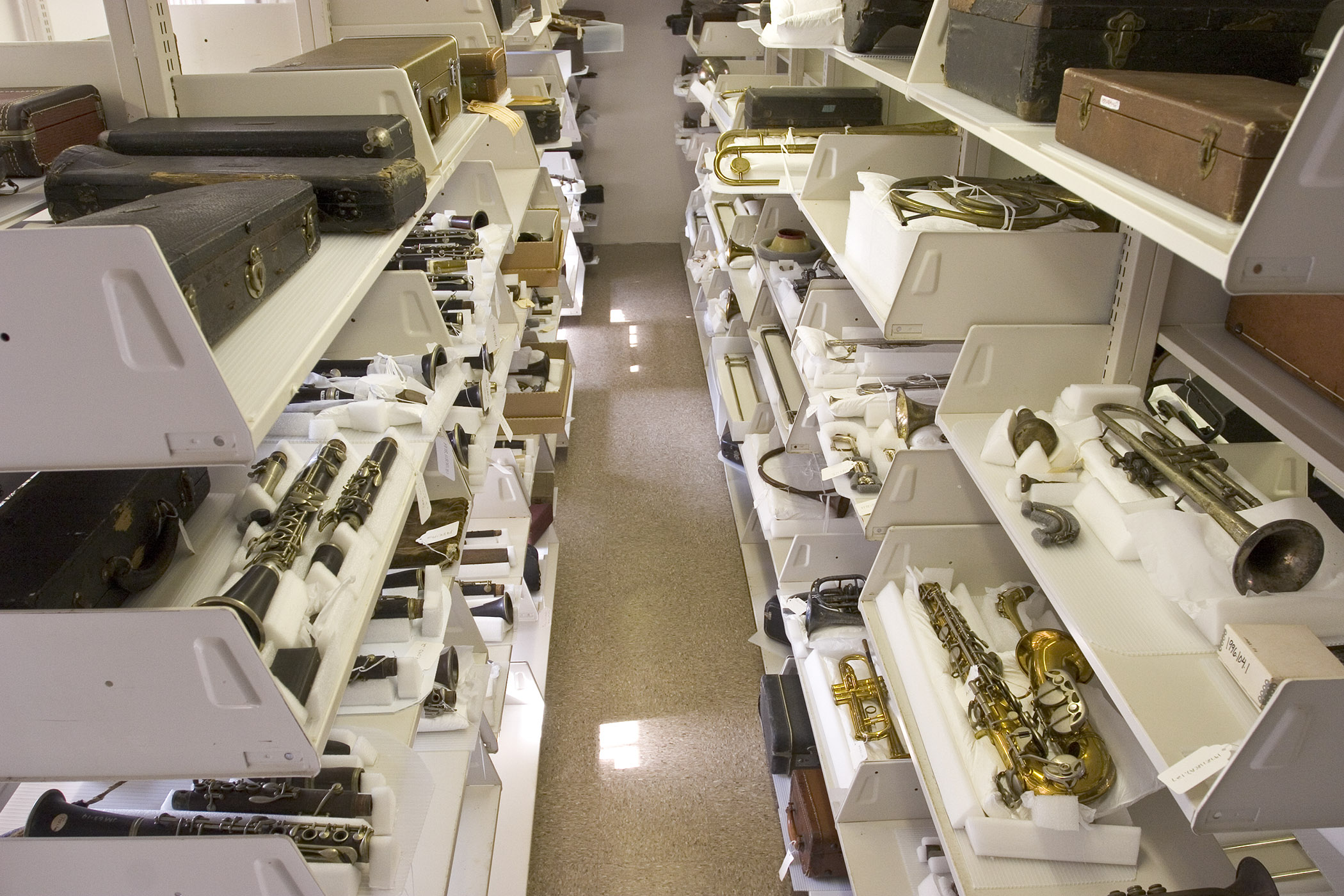
Part of the New Orleans Jazz Museum's instrument collection.

=== Collections ===
The museum’s collection includes the world-renowned New Orleans Jazz Club Collection, which was gathered over several decades by the New Orleans Jazz Club. The collection includes the world’s largest collection of jazz instruments, prized artifacts, photographs, and ephemera. Examples of artifacts within the collection range from Louis Armstrong's first cornet to a 1917 disc of the first jazz recording ever made. It includes the world's largest collection of instruments owned and played by important figures in jazz- trumpets, cornets, trombones, clarinets and saxophones played by jazz greats such as Bix Beiderbecke, Edward "Kid" Ory, George Lewis, Sidney Bechet, and Dizzy Gillespie. Other artifacts in the collection include some 12,000 photographs from the early days of jazz; recordings in a wide variety of formats, including over 4,000 78 rpm records that date from 1905 to the mid- 1950s, several thousand 12-inch LPs and 45 rpm records, and approximately 1,400 reel-to-reel tapes; posters, paintings and prints; hundreds of examples of sheet music from late 19th-century ragtime to popular songs of the 1940s and 1950s - many of them first editions that became jazz standards; several hundred rolls of film featuring concert and nightclub footage, funerals, parades, and festivals; hundred of pieces of relevant ephemera; and architectural fragments from important jazz venues.

In addition, the collection includes research materials such as letters, photographs, and interviews, which are available to researchers by appointment.

=== Exhibits ===
The New Orleans Jazz Museum focuses on the birth and history of jazz in New Orleans, its legacy, and continuing relevance. The museum is currently producing a series of changing exhibits and is in the process of expanding its exhibit space. The future exhibit space will total approximately 8,000 square feet and include a visitor orientation center, a main exhibit space for permanent displays, classrooms for youth and family education, a rotating special exhibits gallery, and four interactive technology spaces for guests to create and share their own forms of jazz music.

=== Live performances ===
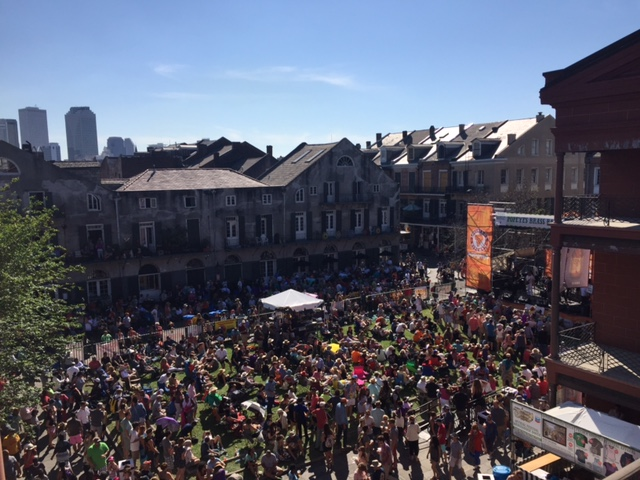
Visitors enjoying a public event hosted by the New Orleans Jazz Museum. View of Barracks Street courtyard.

The New Orleans Jazz Museum hosts performances in its performance venue located on the third floor. These performances educate audiences about the depth and breadth of jazz and give a live, vibrant significance to the museum’s ongoing work. The New Orleans Jazz Museum is also the site of a number of annual festivals, including French Quarter Fest, Satchmo Fest, Downriver Fest, Creole Tomato Fest, International Guitar Fest, Danny Barker Fest, etc.

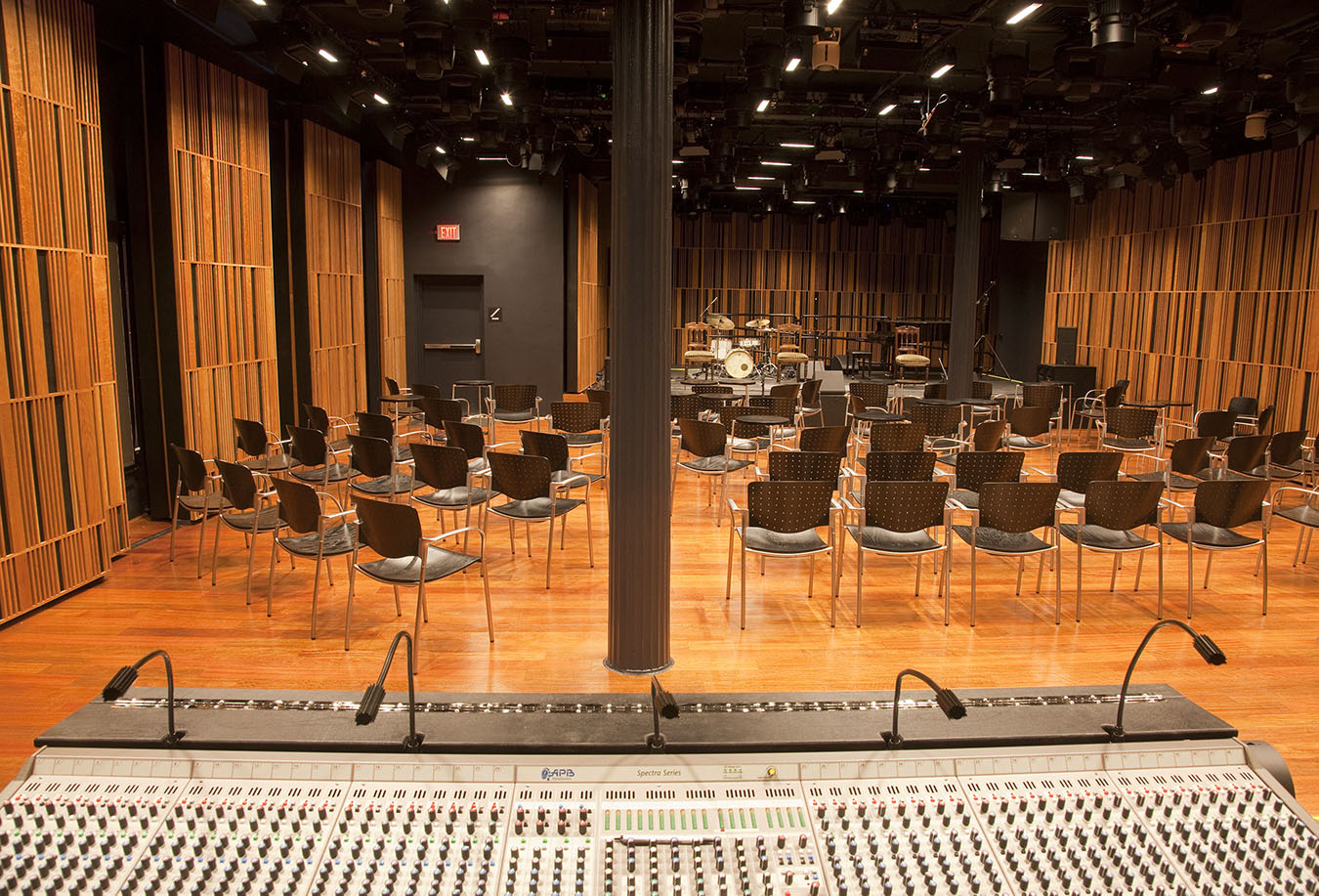
New Orleans Jazz Museum's live performance venue.

=== Education ===
The New Orleans Jazz Museum at the Old U.S. Mint is home to multi-generational educational programming. For scholars, the New Orleans Jazz Museum provides access to its world-class collection and research facilities through the Louisiana Historical Center. Additionally, the New Orleans Jazz Museum links the audio collections to its website, providing access to its internationally recognized Jazz Collection. For youth and families, the museum’s education programs include music lessons, instrument building workshops, appearances from guest musicians, and instruction in recording technologies. These educational initiatives align frequently with established learning objectives of the museum and include performance and composing camps and retreats. Many of these educational activities are conducted in partnership with the New Orleans Jazz National Historical Park.

== See also ==
- List of music museums
