= Mark Lawrence (musician) =

American musician

Mark H. Lawrence is an American classical musician and academic who was the principal trombonist of the San Francisco Symphony Orchestra from 1974 to 2007.

== Education ==
Lawrence was educated at the University of Michigan and the Curtis Institute of Music.

== Career ==
Lawrence is an active soloist, clinician, chamber musician, and teacher. He has performed at the International Brass Conference, the International Trombone Association Conference, and is a frequent recitalist in the United States and abroad. He has been featured as a soloist with the San Francisco Symphony Orchestra on several occasions, and has been guest artist with many other orchestras as well. He is a founding member of Summit Brass, an ensemble composed of outstanding brass players from across America. In addition he is a frequent performer with Chicago's Music of the Baroque.

He has taught at the San Francisco Conservatory of Music, the Colburn School and the Rafael Mendez Brass Institute. He has been on the faculty of Boston University, the Tanglewood Institute, and the Music Academy of the West, and has given master classes worldwide. Many of his former students have gone on to successful orchestral careers in the U.S. and in Europe.
