= C. G. Conn =

American musical instrument manufacturer

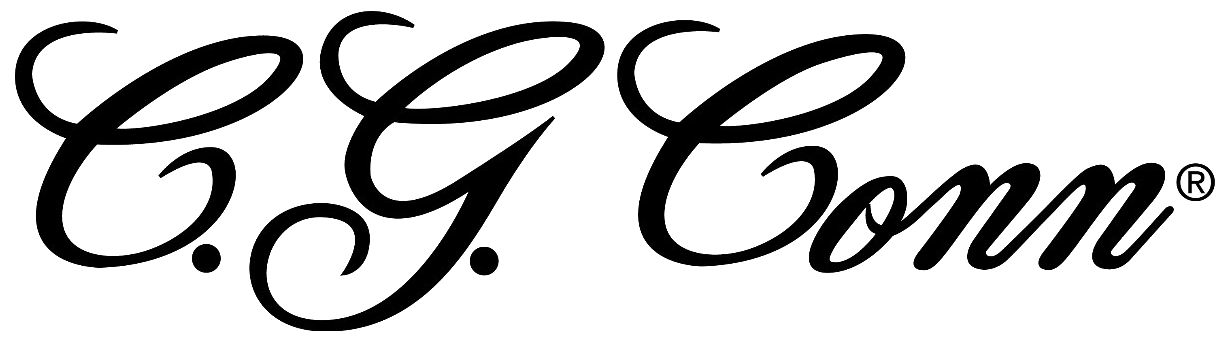
- Type: Private (1876–1915); Public (1915–1969); Subsidiary (1969–1980); Private (1980–1985); Subsidiary (1986–2003); Brand (2003–present)
- Founded: 1876; 150 years ago
- Founder: Charles Gerard Conn
- Fate: dissolved and name relegated to Brand status after multiple ownership changes and structures, 2003
- Headquarters: Elkhart, Indiana, United States
- Key people: Charles Gerard Conn, founder
- Products: Brass instruments
- Owner: Conn-Selmer
- Parent: Crowell-Collier-MacMillan (1969–80); United Musical Instruments (1986–2000); Steinway Musical Instruments (2000–03); Conn-Selmer (2003–present)

C. G. Conn Ltd., Conn Instruments or commonly just Conn, is a former American manufacturer of musical instruments incorporated in 1915. It bought the production facilities owned by Charles Gerard Conn, a major figure in early manufacture of brasswinds and saxophones in the USA. Its early business was based primarily on brass instruments, which were manufactured in Elkhart, Indiana. During the 1950s the bulk of its sales revenue shifted to electric organs. In 1969 the company was sold to the Crowell-Collier-MacMillan publishing company, who closed its Elkhart production facility in 1970, leaving remaining production in satellite facilities and contractor sources.

The company was sold in 1980 and then again in 1985, reorganized under the parent corporation United Musical Instruments (UMI) in 1986. The assets of UMI were bought by Steinway Musical Instruments in 2000 and in January 2003 were merged with other Steinway properties into a subsidiary called Conn-Selmer. C. G. Conn survived as a brand of musical instruments manufactured by Conn-Selmer, retaining several instruments for which it was known: the Conn 8D horn, 88H trombone, 62H bass trombone, 52BSP trumpet and the 1FR flugelhorn.

== History ==
=== Company origins ===
Charles G. Conn was a Civil War veteran of the U.S. Army who, after the war, established a grocery and baking business in Elkhart, Indiana. He also played cornet in the local community band. Conn's entrance into the musical instrument manufacturing business was the result of a split lip. There are three existing stories of how this occurred, but the popularly accepted version is that Del Crampton slugged him in the mouth outside a saloon where both of them had been drinking. Conn's upper lip was severely lacerated, and it pained him so to play his cornet that he thought his playing days were over. In addition to running his store, Conn also made rubber stamps and re-plated silverware. He decided to try adhering rubber stamp material to the rim of a mouthpiece which he hoped would conform to his lips. After he showed his friends his idea, he realized that there was tremendous demand for his invention. Conn then began to contemplate manufacturing his new mouthpiece. He needed a rim with a groove which the rubber cement would adhere to more easily. It was in 1874 when Conn converted a discarded sewing machine frame into a simple lathe and started to turn out his mouthpieces and was soon in full production (Subsequently, Conn and Del Crampton became best of friends, and when Conn embarked on his political career, he was a staunch advocate of temperance). Conn patented his rubber-rimmed mouthpiece in 1875 (with patents to follow through 1877) described as "an elastic face [i.e., a rubber rim] where the mouthpiece comes in contact with the lips, the object being to prevent fatigue and injury to the lips."

=== Growth of Conn's musical instrument business ===
Conn met Eugene Victor Baptiste Dupont, a brass instrument maker and designer and a former employee of Henry Distin of London. In January 1876, Conn joined with Dupont under the name of Conn & Dupont, and Dupont created Conn's first instrument, the Four-in-One cornet, with crooks allowing the horn to be played in the keys of E♭, C, B♭, and A. By 1877, Conn's business had outgrown the back of his grocery store, and he purchased an idle factory building on the corner of Elkhart Avenue and East Jackson. Conn's partnership with Dupont was dissolved by March 1879, but he was successful in attracting skilled craftsmen from Europe to his factory, and in this manner he expanded his operation so that by 1905, Conn had the world's largest musical instrument factory producing a full line of wind instruments, strings, percussion, and a portable organ. Conn partnered with Albert T. Armstrong, Joseph Jones, and Emory Foster to manufacture a twin-horn disc phonograph called the 'Double-Bell Wonder' that was produced in two iterations briefly in early 1898 before a lawsuit by the Berliner Gramophone Company caused production to cease. Brick-red 'Wonder' records were also pressed for the 'Double-Bell Wonder' talking machine by the Scranton Button Works from pirated Berliner masters. Fewer than fifty 'Double-Bell Wonders' were produced of both iterations combined.

Conn's first factory was destroyed by fire on January 29, 1883 (his thirty-ninth birthday), and he erected a new building on the same site. In 1886 rumors began to circulate that Conn wanted to move his business to Massachusetts. Conn was induced to stay after the public raised a large sum of money by popular subscription and gave it to him. In 1887 Conn purchased Isaac Fiske's brass instrument manufactory in Worcester, Massachusetts, upon Fiske's retirement. Fiske's operation was considered to be the best in its time. Conn operated it as a company subsidiary, and in this way he achieved his objectives. The company's product line now centered on the 'Wonder' cornet, but in 1885 Conn began importing French clarinets and flutes. Conn prototyped the first American-made saxophone in 1888, after being shown an Adolphe Sax saxophone by his employee Ferdinand August Buescher and agreeing to produce a copy of it. That instrument belonged to Edward A. Lefebre, a well known soloist with both Patrick Gilmore's and John Philip Sousa's bands. After working on prototypes with advice from Lefebre, Conn settled on production models of saxophones and started regular production around 1892. Conn's instruments were endorsed by several leading band directors, including Sousa. In 1898, on the suggestion of Sousa, Conn developed the first commercially successful bell-up sousaphone ("the rain-catcher"). Conn phased out the Worcester operation (closed in 1898), and Conn established a store in New York City (1897–1902) that sold a large variety of merchandise under the 'Wonder' label, including Conn-made woodwind, brass and percussion instruments, violins, mandolins and portable reed organs. The business also distributed American-made and imported guitars, banjos and zithers.

Conn's marketing included not only sales of instruments but promotion of brass bands. He founded the Conn Conservatory to train the brass instrument teachers who would be a vital component in the growth of the musical instrument industry. During the 1890s E.A. Lefebre started teaching saxophone at the Conservatory, which provided a boost to the availability of saxophone instruction and the following growth of saxophone sales into the twentieth century.

Conn's company was a source of competitors as well as instruments. Notable employees who left the firm to pursue their own businesses were composer W. Paris Chambers, the founder of the Seidel Band Instrument Company William F. Seidel, the founder of the Buescher Band Instrument Company Ferdinand A. Buescher, the founder of the F.E. Olds Company Frank E. Olds, the founder of the Martin Band Instrument Company Henry Charles Martin, and William Gronert and Harry Pedler, who would go on to form AMC (American Manufacturing Company) in 1916, which re-organized as Harry Pedler & Co., after Gronert's death in 1919.

Conn's second factory burned on 22 May 1910, a loss estimated between $100,000 and $500,000. Conn was en route from California to Elkhart when his factory burned, and upon arriving home he was met with a public demonstration, a way of showing popular sympathy. Conn then announced his intentions to build a third factory on the corner of East Beardsley and Conn Avenues. Construction began 15 August 1910, and by the following 12 December it was fully operational.

=== Conn's other enterprises ===
Conn's career grew well beyond the realm of musical instrument manufacturing. In 1892 he was elected to the United States Congress, in 1908 he ran for Governor of Indiana and lost, and in 1910 he ran for Senator. In 1889, Conn founded the Elkhart Daily Truth, published the monthly Trumpet Notes and a scandal sheet called The Gossip, and purchased The Washington Times, which he later sold. After a failed entry into the utilities business, the building of his third factory (and its loss to fire), and his loss of a costly lawsuit filed against him by a former company manager, Conn had amassed significant debts. In 1911, in an effort to bond Conn's debts and secure working capital, Conn and his wife executed a trust deed for $200,000 covering not only the horn factory, but all their possessions, with the longest bond to mature in ten years. Conn's growing debt crisis forced him to seek a buyer for his assets, and in 1915 all of Conn's holdings, including the horn factory, were bought by a group of investors led by Carl Dimond Greenleaf, whom Conn had met during his years in Washington, D.C.

=== Carl D. Greenleaf and C. G. Conn, Ltd., 1915–1949 ===
Carl Greenleaf was president of Conn from 1915 to 1949. The new company was incorporated with public stock offerings under the name C. G. Conn, Ltd. and the Conn trademark was updated to the official name of the new company. Greenleaf was an astute businessman, sensitive to the market trends of the industry. While president, Greenleaf noted the gradual decline of the small town brass band, and of the big touring bands such as the Sousa band. To shore up the future market for band instruments, he undertook to promoting band programs in schools and colleges. He proceeded to develop a close relationship and communications between the industry and music educators. His collaboration with educators such as Joseph E. Maddy and T.P. Giddings helped introduce band music into public schools. Greenleaf organized the first national band contest in 1923 and helped make possible the founding of the National Music Camp at Interlochen, Michigan. In 1928 he founded a Conn National School of Music which trained hundreds of school band directors, and this in turn helped spur the development of music programs in schools and communities across the United States.

Under Greenleaf's leadership the company converted distribution from mail-order to retail dealers and expanded its product line through acquisitions. C. G. Conn founded the Continental Music retail subsidiary in 1923 which, at the height of its success, included a chain of over 30 music stores. During the 1920s C. G. Conn owned the Elkhart Band Instrument Company (1923–27), the Leedy Company (1929–55), a manufacturer of percussion, and 49.9% of the stock of the retailer H. & A. Selmer (1923–27). Conn purchased the drum manufacturer Ludwig and Ludwig, the instrument import/retail operation of the Carl Fischer company, and accordion manufacturer Soprani in 1929. From 1940 to 1950 the company owned the Haddorff Piano Company, and from 1941 to 1942 the Straube Piano Company.

Greenleaf expanded and upgraded C. G. Conn's plant to increase production and developed new lines of wind instruments to sell. By 1917, using a new hydraulic expansion process which Greenleaf introduced to the plant, the assembly-line work force had increased to 550 employees who were turning out about 2500 instruments a month. In 1917 C. G. Conn introduced the Pan American brand for its second-line instruments, forming the Pan American Band Instrument Company subsidiary in 1919 and moving production of second-line instruments to the old Angledile Scale factory, which had been transferred to the new company among Conn's other assets, later that year. In 1930 the Pan American company was absorbed by C. G. Conn, with Conn retaining and utilizing the Pan American brand for its second-line instruments until 1955.

By 1920 C. G. Conn was producing a complete line of saxophones. In this area they had competition from other big saxophone makers such as Buescher and Martin. Around 1917 C.G. Conn introduced drawn tone holes (a feature patented by W.S. Haynes in 1914) eliminating the process of soldering tone holes onto the bodies of the instruments. Around 1920 C. G. Conn introduced rolled tone hole rims, a feature that enhanced the seal of the pads and extended pad life. Rolled tone holes remained a feature of Conn saxophones until 1947. By the late 1920s the success of Conn's latest "New Wonder" model saxophones with dance orchestras was gaining widespread attention, leading European manufacturers to produce horns closer to the deeper, richer, bolder "American" sound. Selmer (Paris) introduced the American-sounding "New Largebore" model in 1929 and the new Julius Keilwerth Company in Czechoslovakia produced saxophones influenced by the C. G. Conn design, including rolled tone holes and microtuners. As sax sales plateaued in 1928, Conn introduced a mezzo-soprano saxophone in the key of F and the "Conn-o-sax", a saxophone-English horn hybrid, but these instruments were soon discontinued after disappointing sales.

In 1928, under the direction of Carl Greenleaf's son Leland Burleigh Greenleaf, C. G. Conn opened its Experimental Laboratory, which was unique in the industry. Under Leland Greenleaf's directorship, the department developed the first short-action piston valves (1934), and the 'Stroboconn' (1936), the first electronic visual tuning device. It also developed the "Vocabell" (1932), a bell with no rim, which C. G. Conn described as "vibrat[ing] freely and in sympathy with the vibrating column of air in the instrument," C. G. Conn also developed the "Coprion" bell (1934), a seamless copper bell formed by directly electroplating it onto a mandrel. Under Greenleaf's saxophone specialists Allen Loomis and Hugh Loney, C. G. Conn's research and development resulted in the designs of the 6M alto (1931), 10M tenor (1934), 12M baritone (1930), and 14M bass (1930). The 12M baritone and 14M bass were the first saxophones to have both bell keys on the right side. The 6M alto featured an innovative double socket neck that eliminated the large collar on the body tube at the neck joint for a more positive seal and even response, later adopted by some other manufacturers. From 1935 through 1942, C. G. Conn produced the 26M and 30M "Connqueror" alto and tenor saxophones, featuring screw-adjustable keywork and improved mechanisms for the left hand cluster. The keywork was the most fully adjustable of any saxophone during that period. C. G. Conn's laboratory was expanded into the Division of Research, Development and Design in 1940, directed by Earle Kent. C. G. Conn's combined abilities in close-tolerance manufacturing and electronic devices made them a valuable resource for wartime production.

From mid-1942 to 1945, C. G. Conn ceased all production of musical instruments for civilian use to manufacture flat & mounted compasses, altimeters, gyro-horizon indicators, and other military instrumentation. A special application of C. G. Conn's "Coprion" process—creating seamless brass bells by depositing copper on a mandrel—was to manufacture silver bearing inserts for the Wright Cyclone airplane engines. In winter 1946–47, production was again interrupted, this time by a 15-week labor strike. The loss in sales from those disruptions and increased competition from other manufacturers such as Selmer (Paris) and King (H. N. White) caused a decline in C. G. Conn's status as a major band instrument manufacturer. The company first responded by expanding their lines of electronic musical products, developing the "Connsonata" electronic organ in 1946. They later introduced the "Connstellation" model wind instruments to revitalize those product lines (28M alto saxophone with help from Santy Runyon, 1948, and brass instruments, mid-1950s). The Connstellation brasswinds remained a premium line through the 1960s.

=== The Paul Gazlay – Lee Greenleaf era, 1949–1969 ===
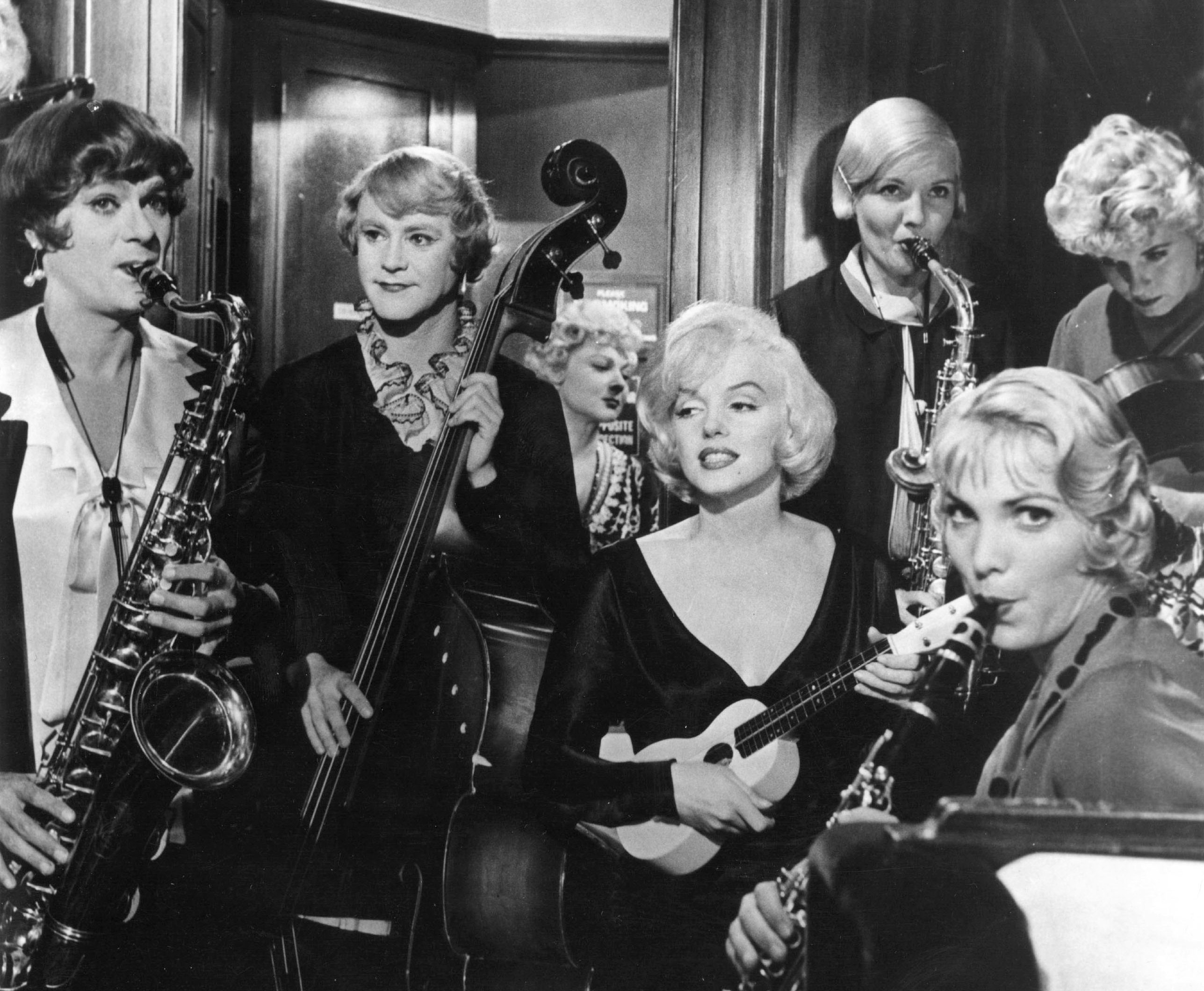
Tony Curtis with a Conn 16M tenor in the movie Some Like It Hot (1959)

Carl Greenleaf retired in 1949 but remained a member of the C. G. Conn board of directors until his death in 1959. He was succeeded by Paul Gazlay. In 1958, Lee Greenleaf succeeded Gazlay as company President. C. G. Conn briefly returned to the manufacture of military instrumentation during the Korean War, while continuing production of musical instruments. Priorities changed under Gazlay, with the high-quality wind instruments on which the company had built its reputation becoming an increasingly marginal interest. The 28M saxophone was discontinued after 1952 and cost-cutting measures were incorporated into the manufacturing process and designs of Conn's 6M, 10M, and 12M "Artist" series saxophones. C. G. Conn shifted their emphasis to the expanding market for school band instruments and to diversifying their instrument lines. In 1956, C. G. Conn sponsored a film to promote school bands entitled Mr. B Natural. To diversify their product line, C. G. Conn acquired as subsidiaries the New Berlin Instrument Company (1954) of New Berlin, New York which took over production of clarinets, oboes, and bassoons for Conn, the Artley Company (1959), a manufacturer of flutes and piccolos, the Janssen Piano Company (1964), and the Scherl & Roth Company (1968), a manufacturer of stringed instruments. C.G. Conn divested itself of Leedy and Ludwig in 1955, Carl Fischer retail in 1959, and New Berlin Instrument in 1961. By 1958, over half of C.G. Conn's sales revenue was from their electric organs. In 1959 C. G. Conn built a new organ factory in Madison, Indiana. The Janssen Piano assets were merged with C. G. Conn's organ division to form Conn Keyboards in 1964.

In 1960, C. G. Conn acquired the Art Best Manufacturing Company facility that built saxophones in Nogales, Arizona. They continued manufacturing saxophones of the Vito design that were produced there, marketed as the Conn 50M alto. Production of other wind instruments remained in Elkhart.

The late 1960s saw trends in the keyboard, wind, and stringed instrument markets that undermined C. G. Conn's position. The growing popularity of portable electronic keyboards was cutting into C. G. Conn's niche of home organs and pianos. The market for student instruments was becoming increasingly competitive, with newcomers from Japan offering products more efficiently produced, with higher quality standards, and more tailored to students' needs. Conn saxophones had ceased to be competitive in the professional market during the 1950s due to outdated designs and declining quality. By the late 1960s, their student line instruments were in competitive decline for similar reasons. In an effort to respond to the rise of electronics in music, Conn tried to also explore market possibilities in these areas and released in 1967 the Conn Multi÷Vider, an electronic device for using on saxophones similar to an octaver. The device achieved some popularity with Jazz artists, like e.g. Tom Scott using it on some of his early recordings. By 1969, C. G. Conn, Ltd. was facing insolvency. Late that year, John N. Latter assumed Conn's presidency, replacing Leland B. Greenleaf (who became chairman of the board).

=== Company from 1969 to 2003 ===
In 1969, C. G. Conn, Ltd. was sold under bankruptcy to the Crowell-Collier MacMillan Company. In 1970, the corporate offices were moved to Oak Brook, Illinois, Conn Keyboards was moved to Carol Stream, Illinois and their piano manufacturing operation sold. The same year, G. C. Conn's Elkhart manufacturing facilities were sold to Selmer (USA) and Coachmen Industries. Brasswind manufacturing moved to Abilene, Texas and saxophone production moved to Nogales, Mexico. Clarinet design and production was shifted to the Artley division, now in Nogales, Arizona. A precipitous drop in product quality followed those moves, initiated as cost-cutting measures by executives not familiar with instrument production, and destroyed whatever was left of Conn's reputation in the wind instrument market. Conn introduced the modernized 7M alto saxophone; it soon acquired the same reputation for poor quality as the other "MexiConns," sold poorly, and was discontinued. In 1970, Conn also started the Conn Guitar Division, operating out of Oak Brook, Illinois, contracting the manufacture of a new line of acoustic guitars to Tokai Gakki in Japan. G. C. Conn's acoustic guitar business ended in 1978. In 1979, G. C. Conn tried to enter the highly competitive electric guitar market, introducing a line of some original model electric guitars, and some copies of existing popular brands. (see History of Conn Guitars).

In 1980, the company was sold to Daniel Henkin, who had served the company as an advertising manager during the 1960s. Henkin moved C. G. Conn's corporate offices back to Elkhart and moved to refocus the company on wind instruments. The failing electric guitar venture was discontinued and Conn Keyboards sold to Kimball. Henkin hired Tonight Show trumpeter and bandleader Doc Severinsen as Vice President of Product Development, and introduced the Conn Severinsen trumpet and Henkin student clarinet. In 1981, Henkin bought the W.T. Armstrong Company, a manufacturer of flutes and marketer of H. Couf branded saxophones made by the Julius Keilwerth company of West Germany. After that acquisition, the Keilwerth instruments were also sold as "Conn DJH Modified" models. The company introduced a student line of oboes and bassoons under the Artley brand in 1983. The same year, Henkin acquired King Musical Instruments of Eastlake, Ohio from the defunct Seeburg Corporation's creditors.

By 1985, Henkin was seeking a buyer for his companies, first selling the Conn Strobotuner division to Peterson Electro-Musical Products. Peterson continues to service the Conn line of tuners. The Swedish investment firm Skåne Gripen bought Henkin's other companies and merged them in 1986 to create a new parent corporation, United Musical Instruments (UMI), headquartered in Nogales, Arizona. UMI closed the Conn Brasswind facility in Abilene, Texas (1986), moving brass instrument production to the King plant in Eastlake. All operations were moved out of Mexico in 1987. Production of Artley flutes was moved to the W. T. Armstrong facility in Elkhart, and reed instrument production was moved back from Nogales, Mexico to Nogales, Arizona.

In 1990, UMI was sold to Bernhard Muskantor, one of the Skåne Gripen partners. Muskantor, with family roots in the musical instrument business, desired a return of the Conn name to respectability, but its arrangement with Keilwerth had recently fallen apart and the increasingly tough market with new low-cost Asian competitors kept Conn's position marginal. In 2000, UMI was purchased by Steinway Musical Instruments, and in January 2003, Steinway merged the UMI assets with their subsidiary The Selmer Company to create the Conn-Selmer division.

== Conn Res-o-Pads ==
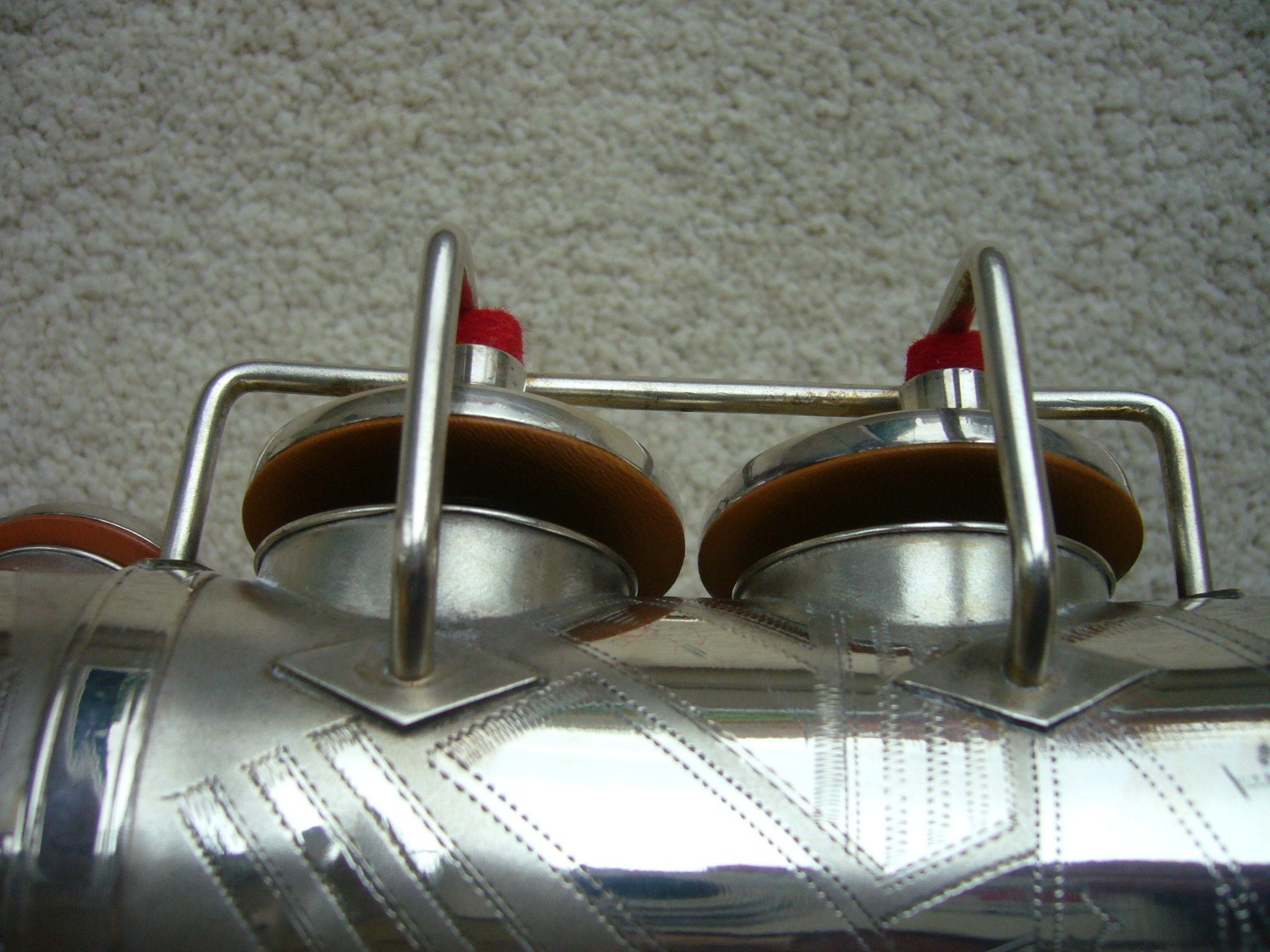
Conn "Res-O-Pads" fitted to the bell-keys on a Selmer 'Pennsylvania Special' alto saxophone, made by Kohlert (Czechoslovakia) in 1938. Note that this instrument has rolled toneholes and that the edge of the pad extends over the rim of the key-cup

Between 1920 and 1947, all professional-grade saxophones manufactured by C. G. Conn had rolled toneholes. In the early 1930s, C. G. Conn developed a unique type of saxophone pad called "Conn Res-o-Pads", which were specifically designed for use on saxophones with rolled toneholes. Conn Res-O-Pads have an internal metal reinforcing ring which is hidden under the leather covering around the circumference of the pad. Their most notable feature is that the diameter of the pad extends over the rim of the key-cup, thereby giving a slightly wider surface area for the rolled tone-hole to seal onto. Rim impressions from Res-o-Pads are minimal and unlike standard pads they cannot be "floated" in. Though designed to fix into key-cups purely via friction, most saxophone repairers glue them in place using shellac or hot melt adhesive. Res-o-Pads can be challenging to size correctly because (unlike modern saxophone pads which come in 0.5 mm size steps) they are only available in 1/32nds of an inch sizes which may not always correspond closely to key-cup diameters. Newly produced Conn Res-o-Pads are still available from specialist suppliers and are favored by some saxophone collectors because they give a fully authentic look and feel to vintage saxophones with rolled toneholes e.g. those made by Conn, Kohlert and Keilwerth. However, it is possible to fit standard pads to any saxophone with rolled toneholes (and many people do) without any noticeable disadvantage regarding the quality of sound produced.

== The Conn Microtuner ==
From 1922 to 1950 Conn manufactured alto and c-melody saxophones with a unique tuning device on the neck known as the "Conn Microtuner." The feature was devised to allow the saxophone to be tuned while maintaining optimal volume in the chamber of the mouthpiece, thus avoiding disturbance to intonation. The device adjusts the length of the neck, controlled by a threaded barrel near the mouthpiece end. To lower the pitch, the barrel was rotated to the left. To raise the pitch the barrel was rotated to the right. The benefits of the microtuner to intonation have been shown to be more theoretical than practical, with the drawbacks that the internal mechanism requires extra cleaning and maintenance and is a potential source of leaks.

Some repair technicians who have play-tested large numbers of Conn altos (cf. Les Arbuckle) report that the microtuner necks lend a different sound quality from those without one. Early Keilwerth and other German-made saxophones also featured microtuners. Since the 1950s, all new saxophones use the traditional tuning method of pulling out or pushing in the mouthpiece on the cork until the pitch is correct.

== Gallery ==
A "Transitional" Conn New Wonder 'Series II' tenor saxophone made in 1934

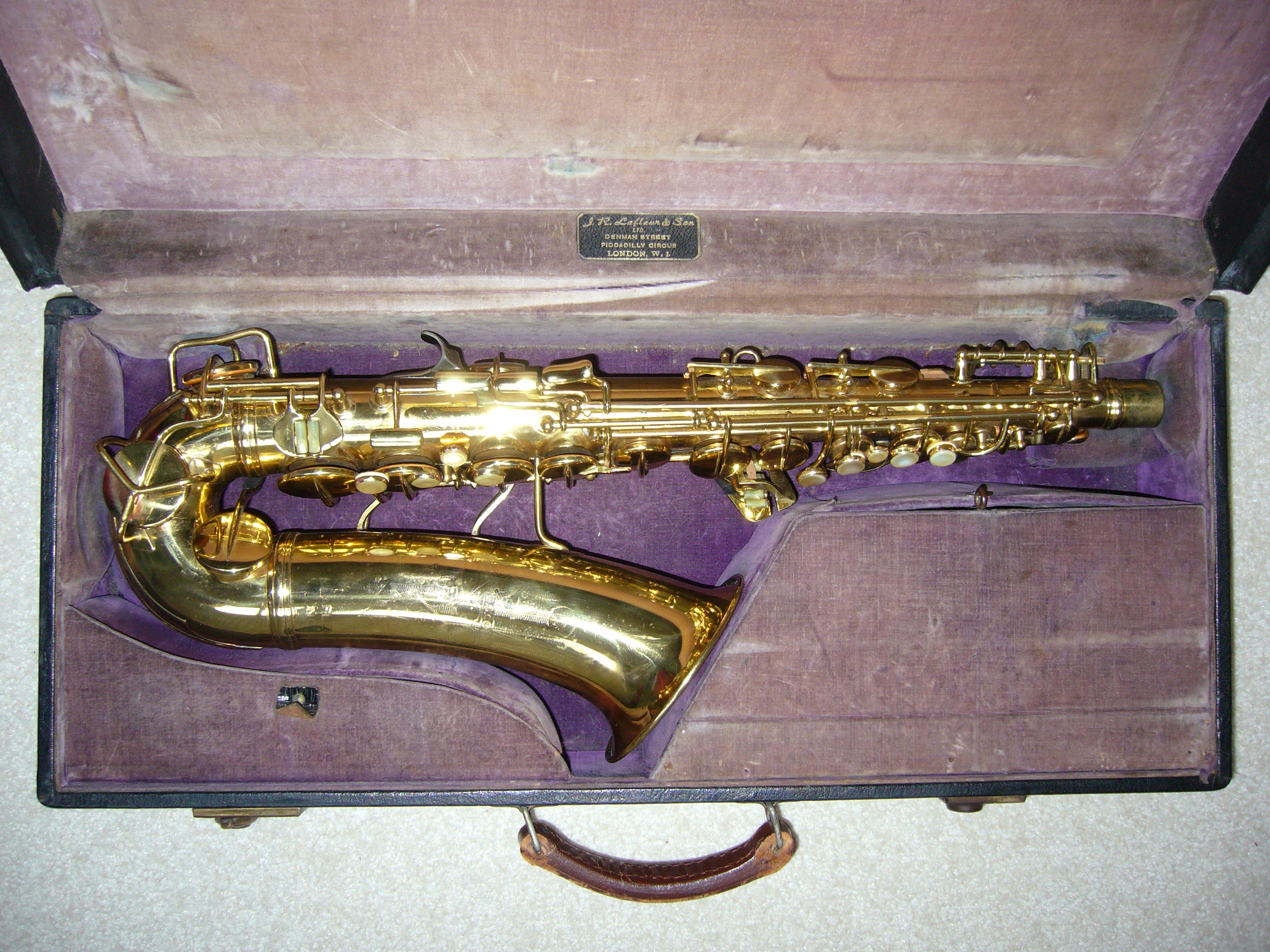
Conn 6M "Lady Face" (dated 1935) in its original case

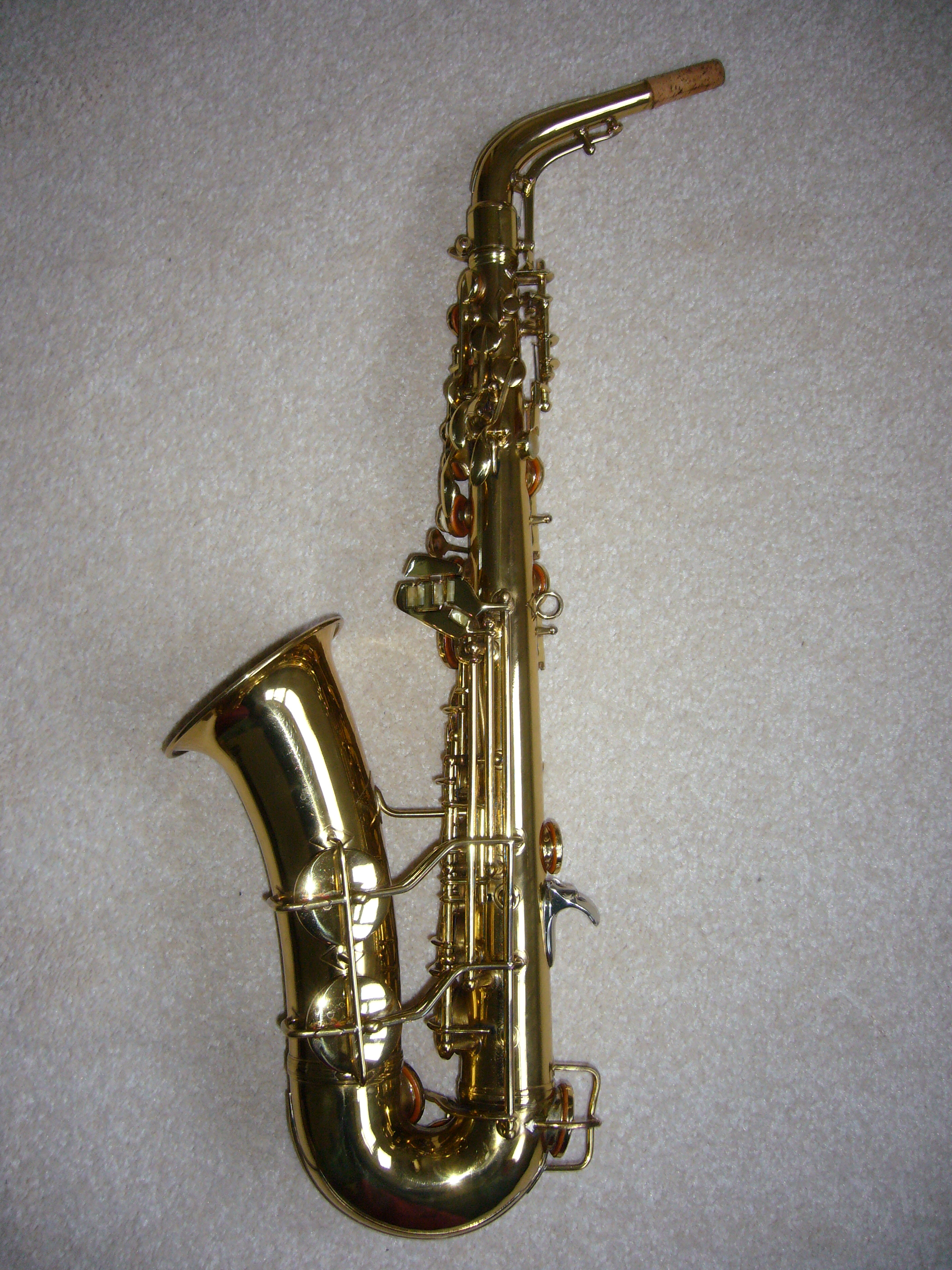
Left side view of Conn 6M "Lady Face" alto saxophone showing distinctive underslung octave key

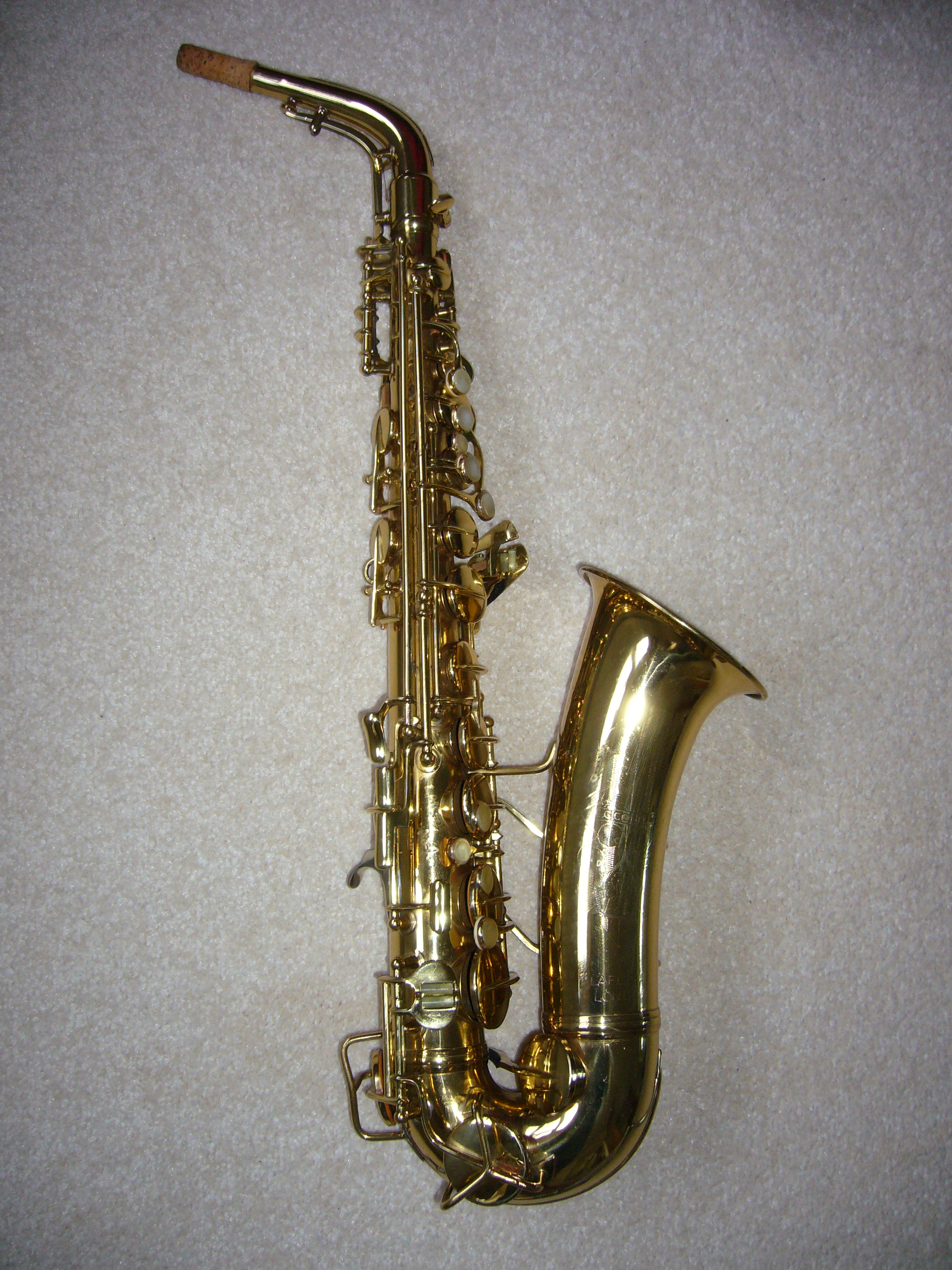
Right side view of Conn 6M "Lady Face" alto saxophone

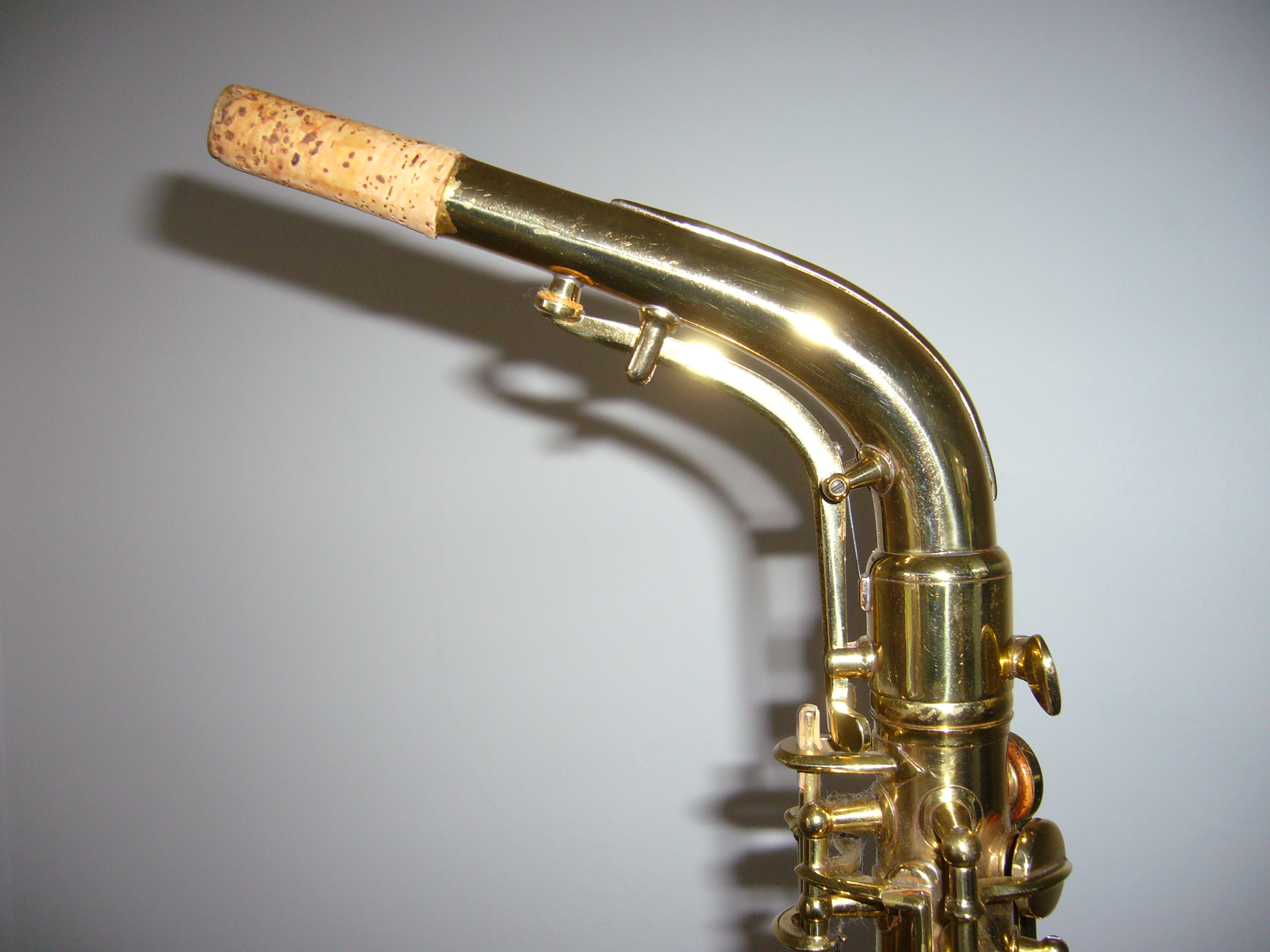
Close-up view of neck with underslung octave key mechanism (no microtuner) on a Conn 6M "Lady Face" alto saxophone

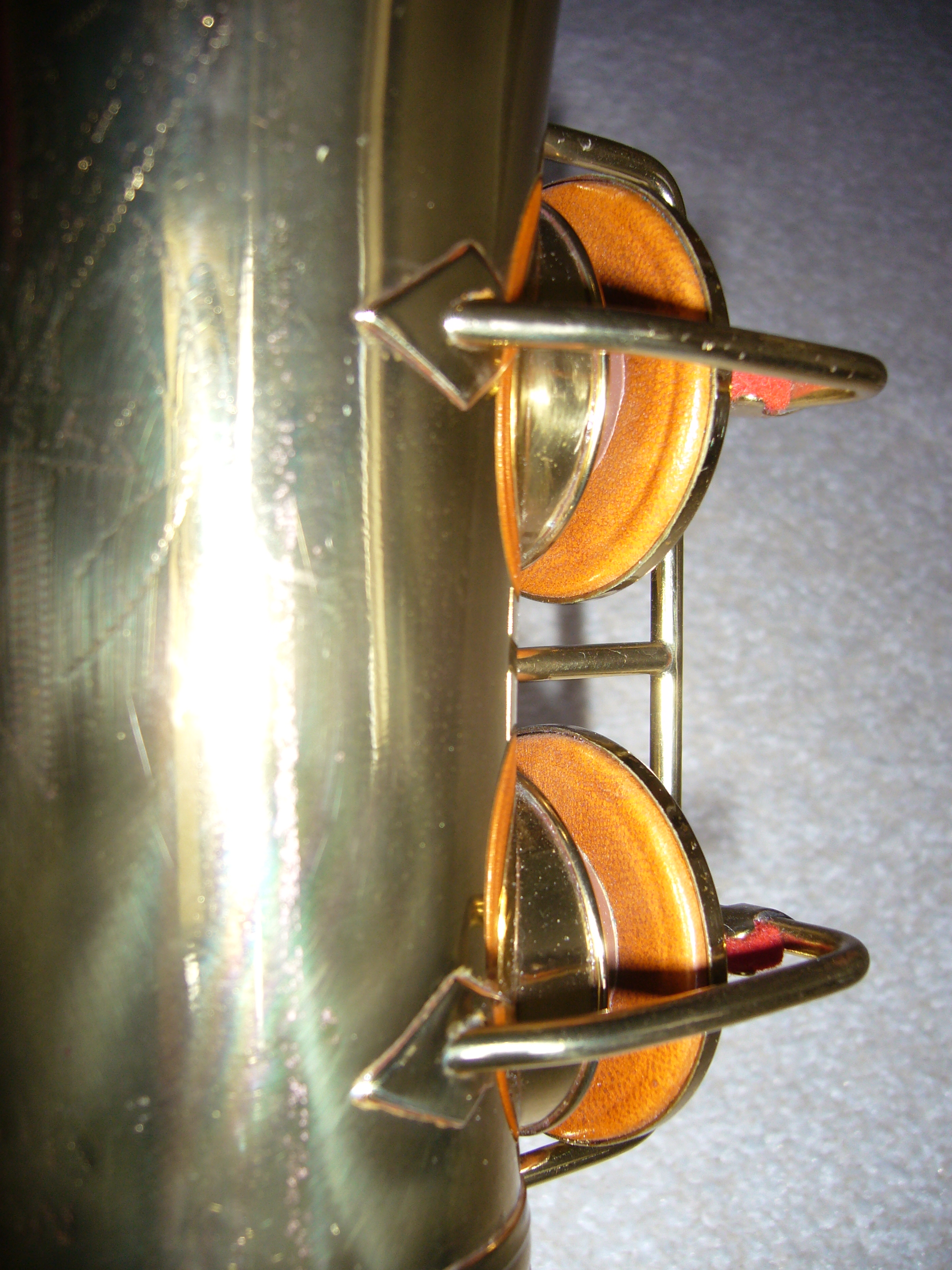
Detail of Conn 6M alto saxophone (dated 1935) showing distinctive pre-1947 rolled saxophone tone holes. Note that Conn Res-o-Pads have not been fitted

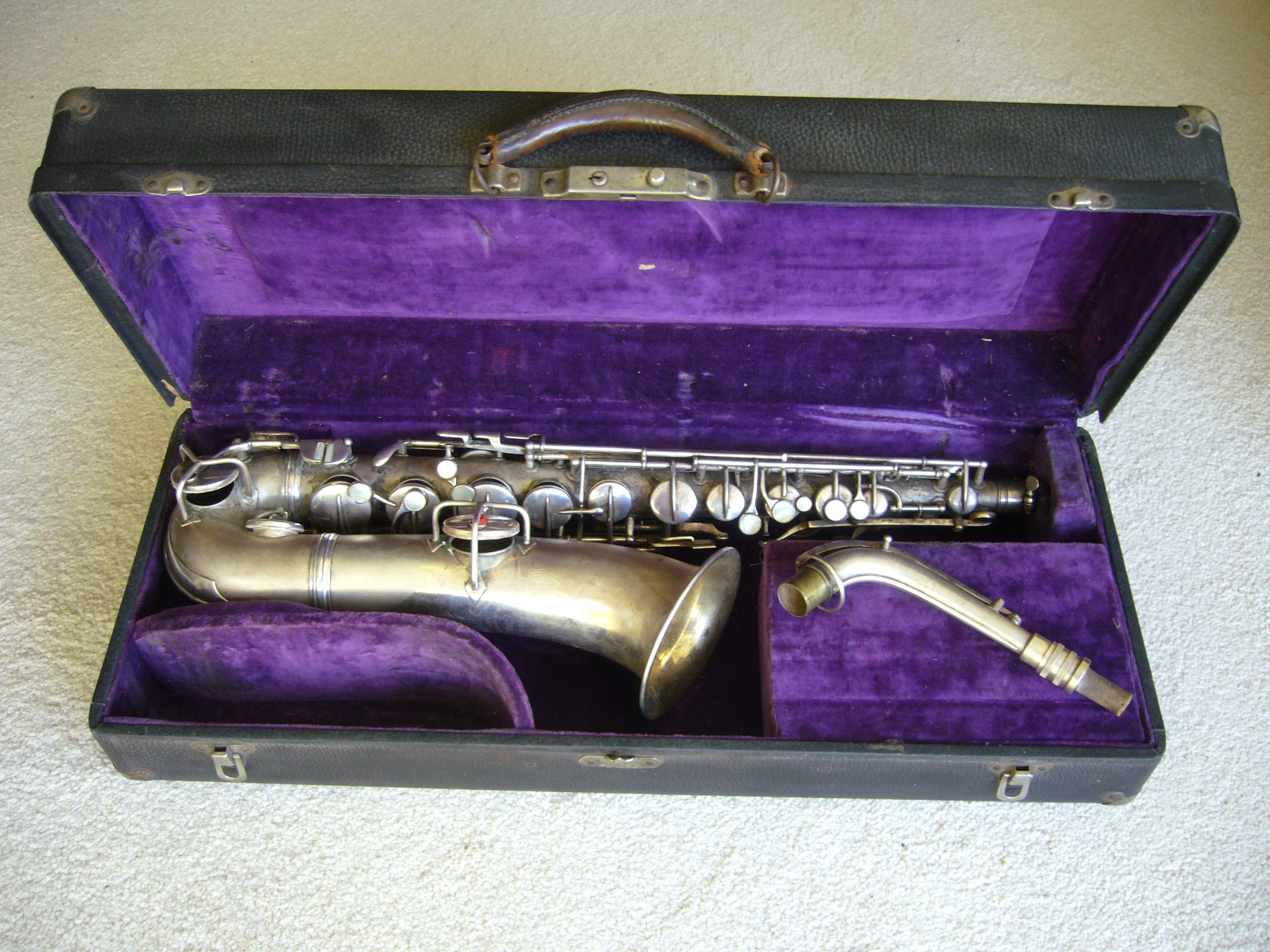
A straight-necked Conn C melody saxophone (New Wonder Series 1) dated 1922. The neck has a Conn micro-tuner on the end.

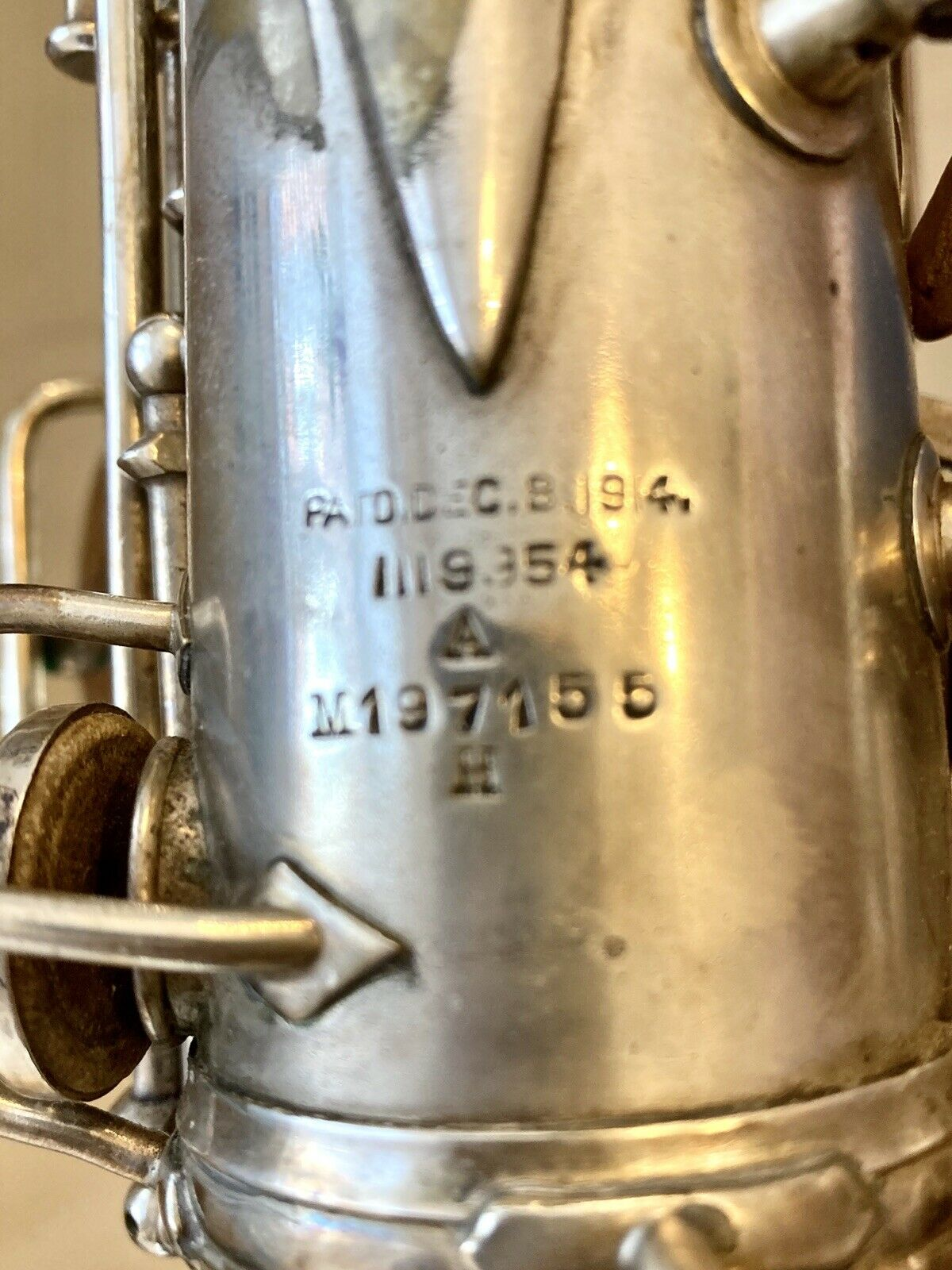
A Conn New Wonder Series 2 alto saxophone (dated 1927). The 'H' below the serial number indicates that it is a "High Pitch" (A=456 Hertz) instrument. A "Low Pitch" saxophone would have 'L' below the serial number.

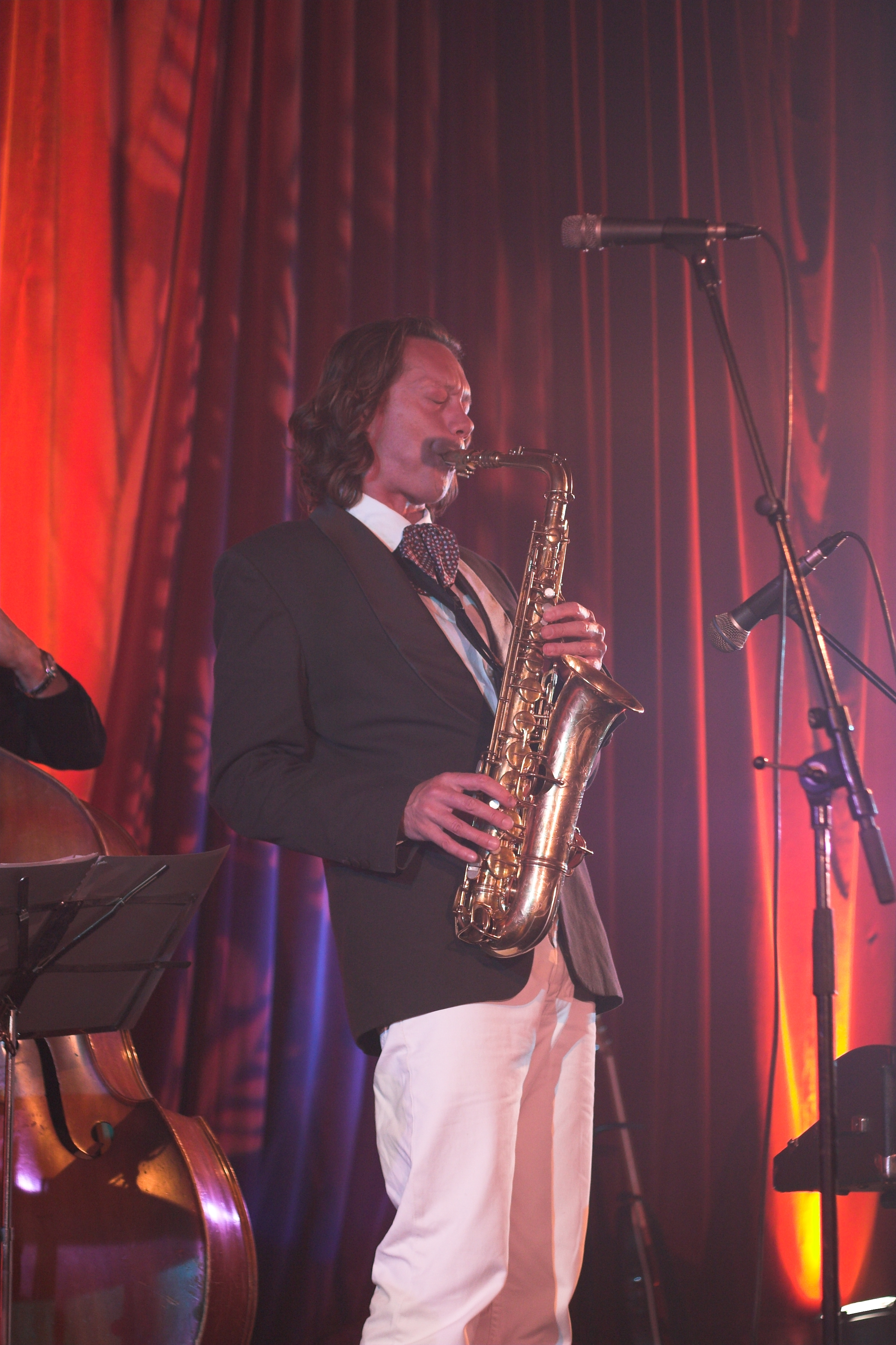
A straight-necked Conn C-melody saxophone (New Wonder Series 2 dating from circa 1926) played by Nathan Haines

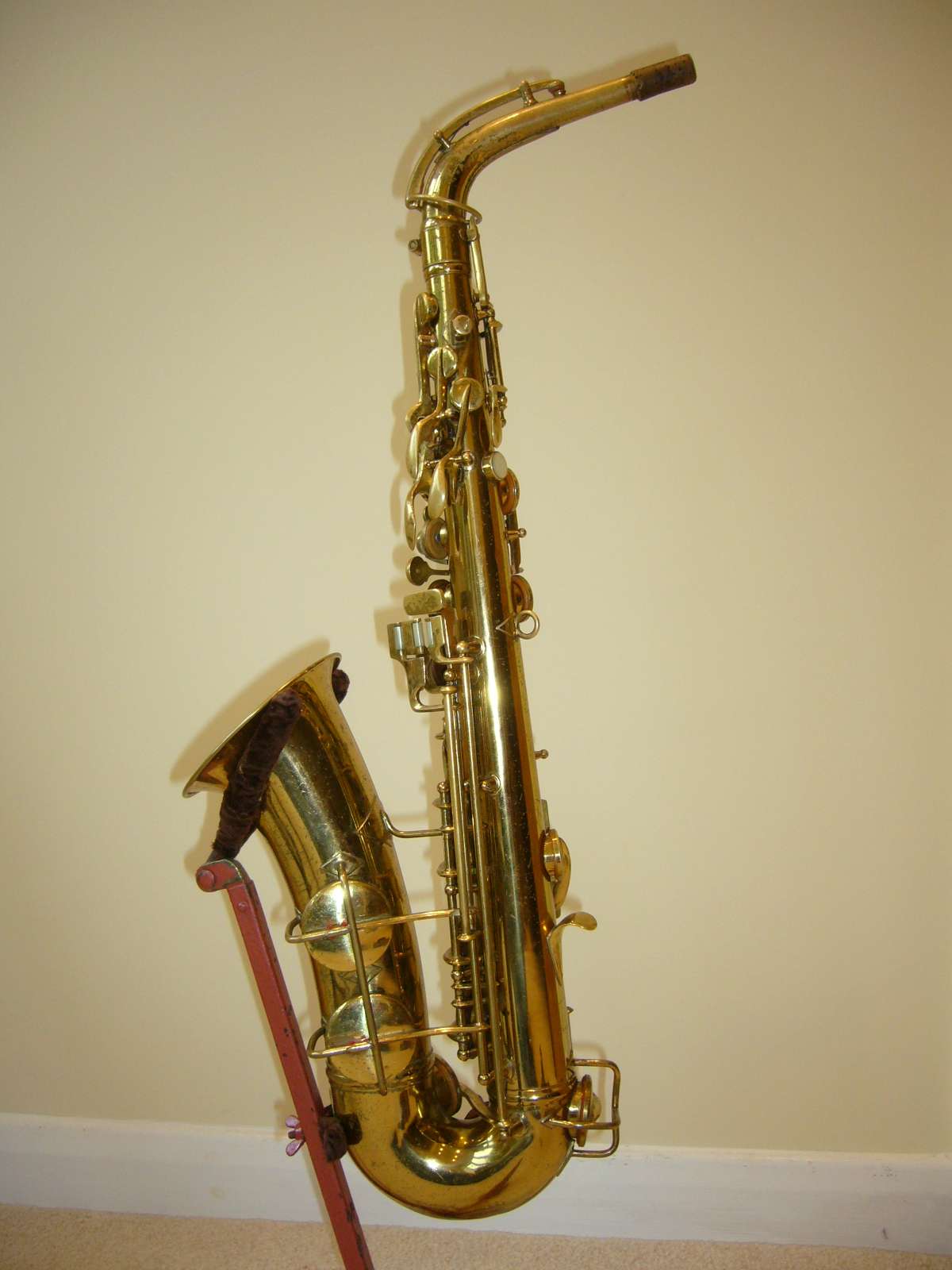
A Conn 'Pan American' alto saxophone, manufactured circa 1948. Has a similar body to a Conn 6M and keywork which is reminiscent of a Conn New Wonder Series 1 and 2

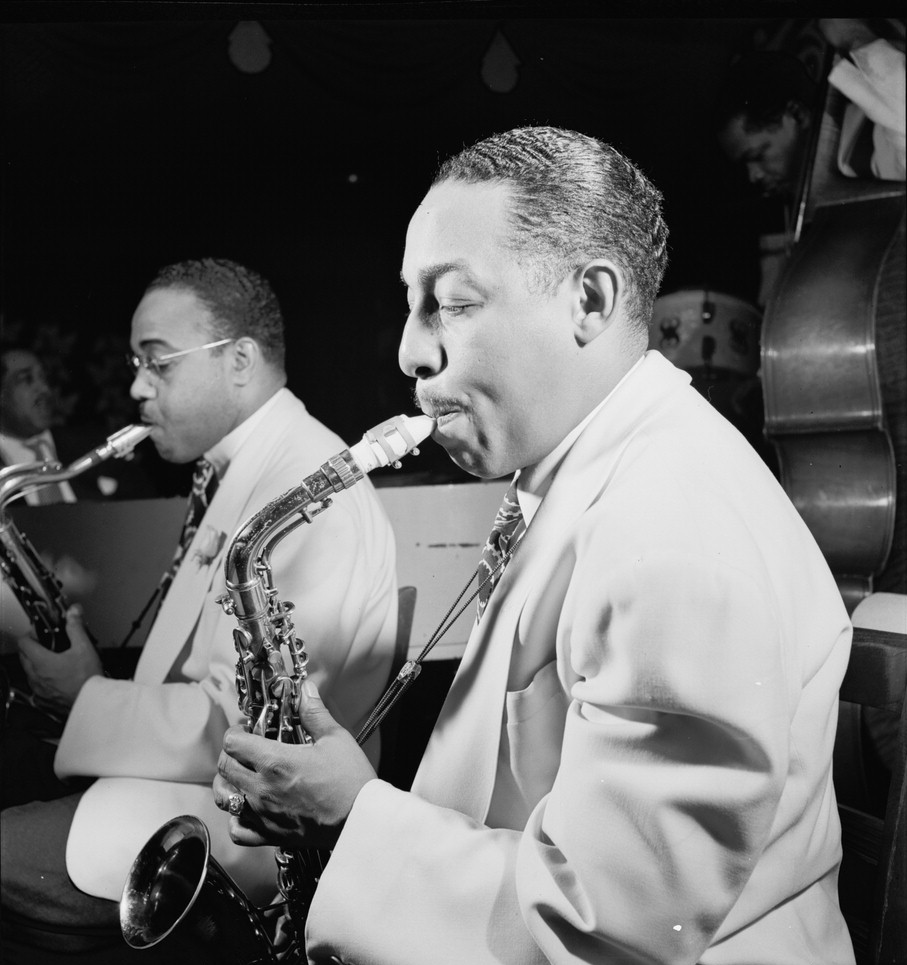
Johnny Hodges in 1946, playing a Conn 6M alto sax

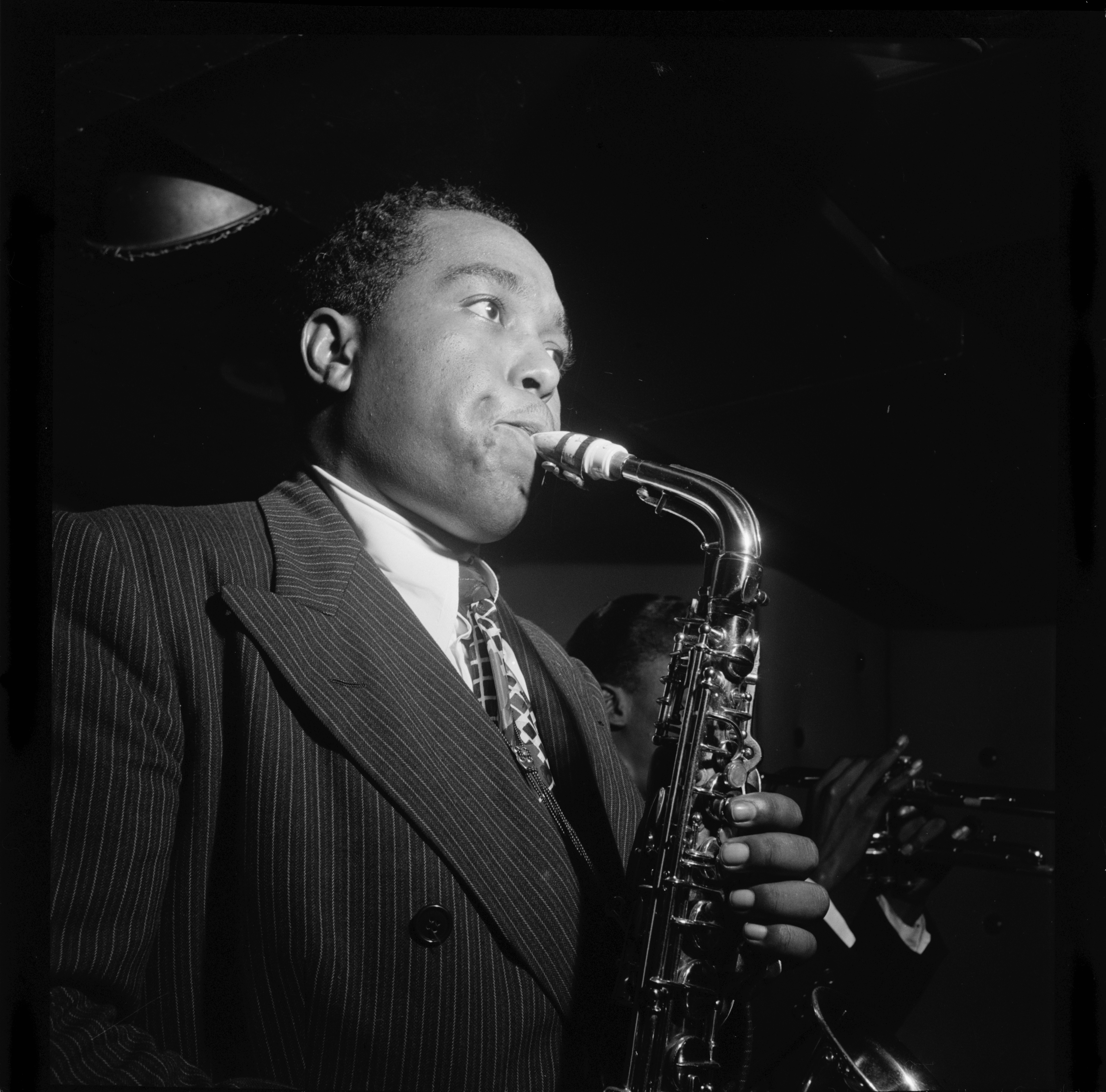
Charlie Parker in 1947, playing a Conn 6M alto saxophone
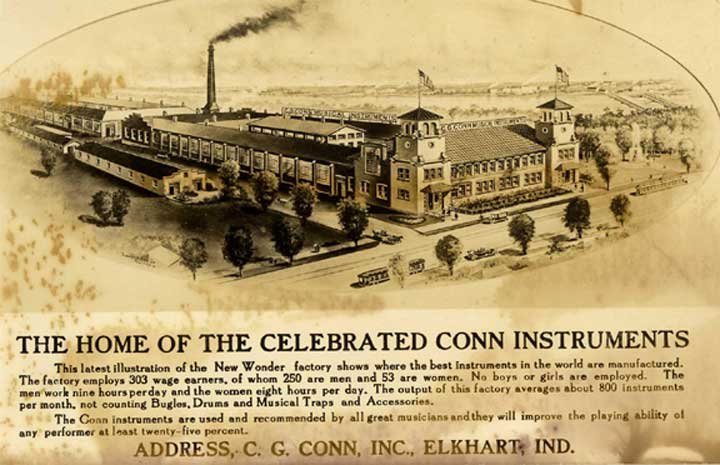
1911 Brochure Cover Illustration

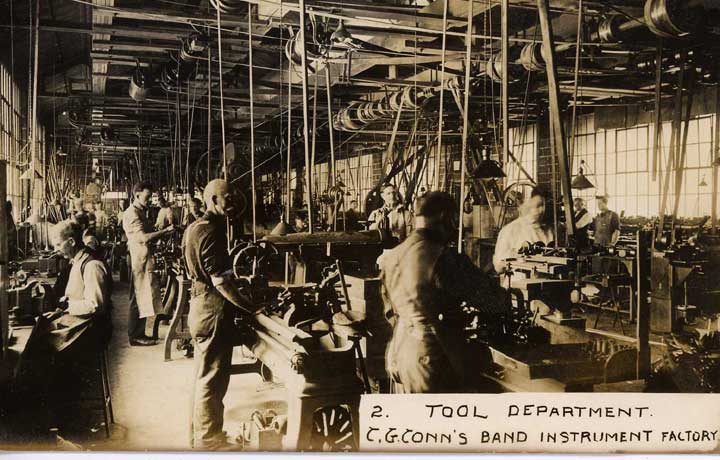
Tool department

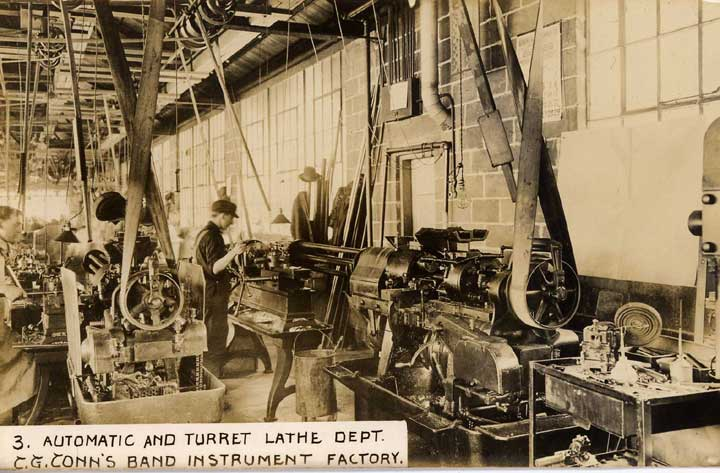
Automatic and turret lathe department

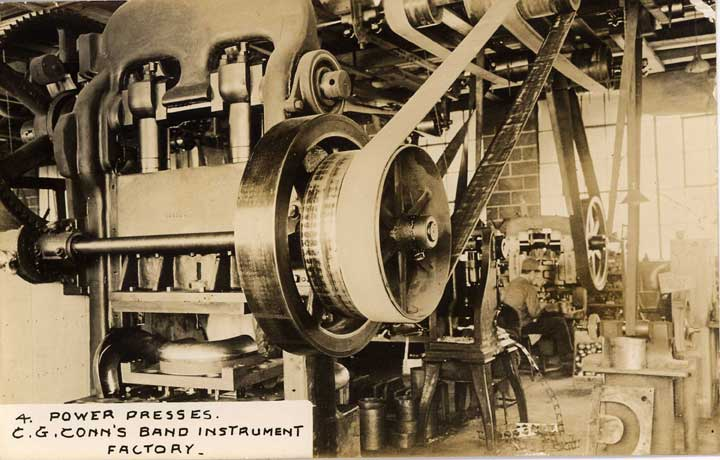
Power Press

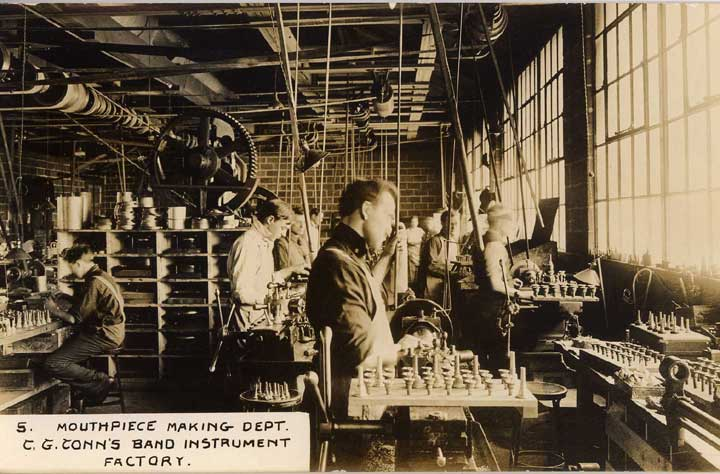
Mouthpiece making department

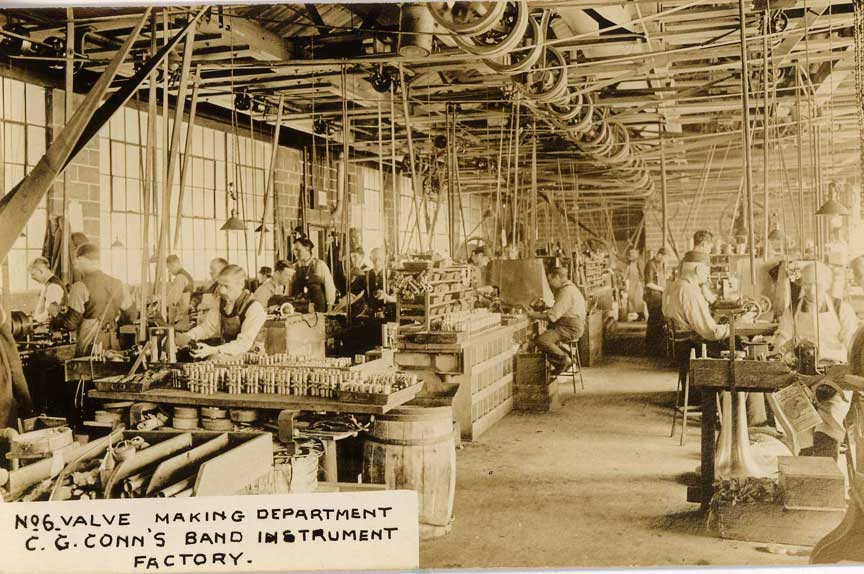
Valve making department

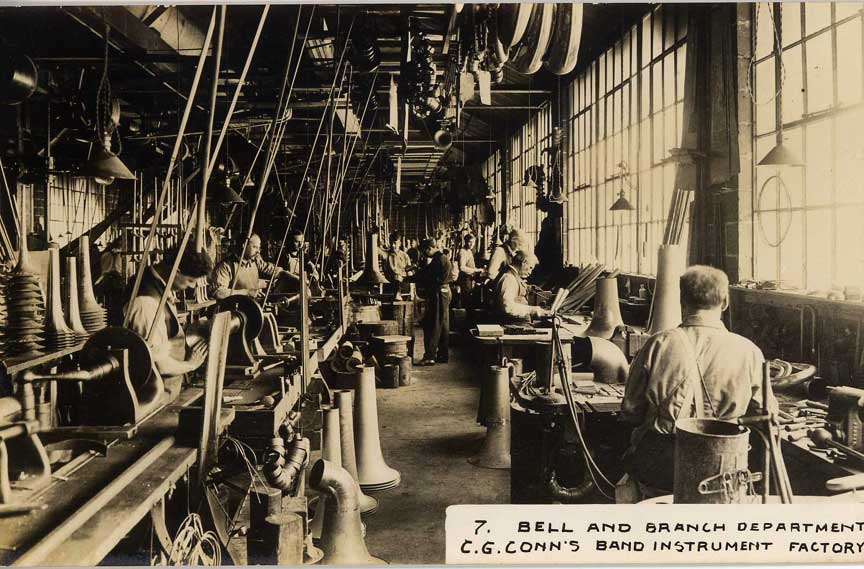
Bell and branch department

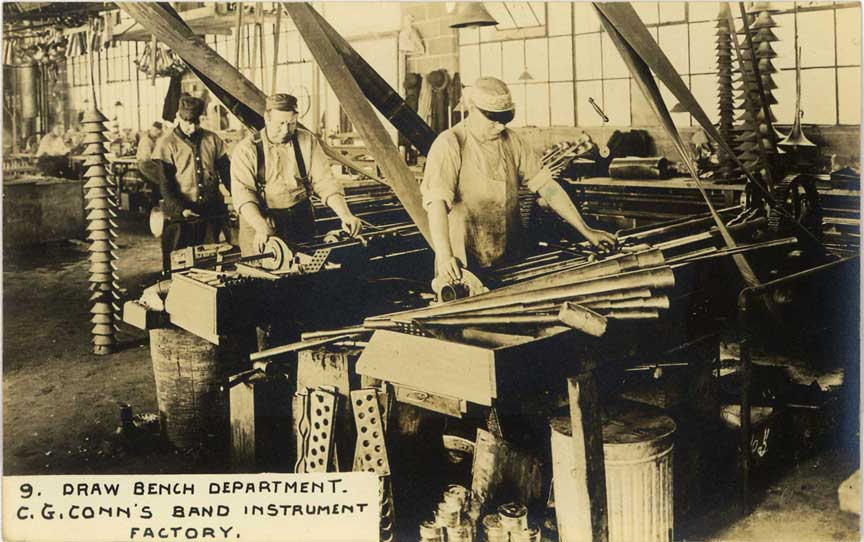
Draw bench department

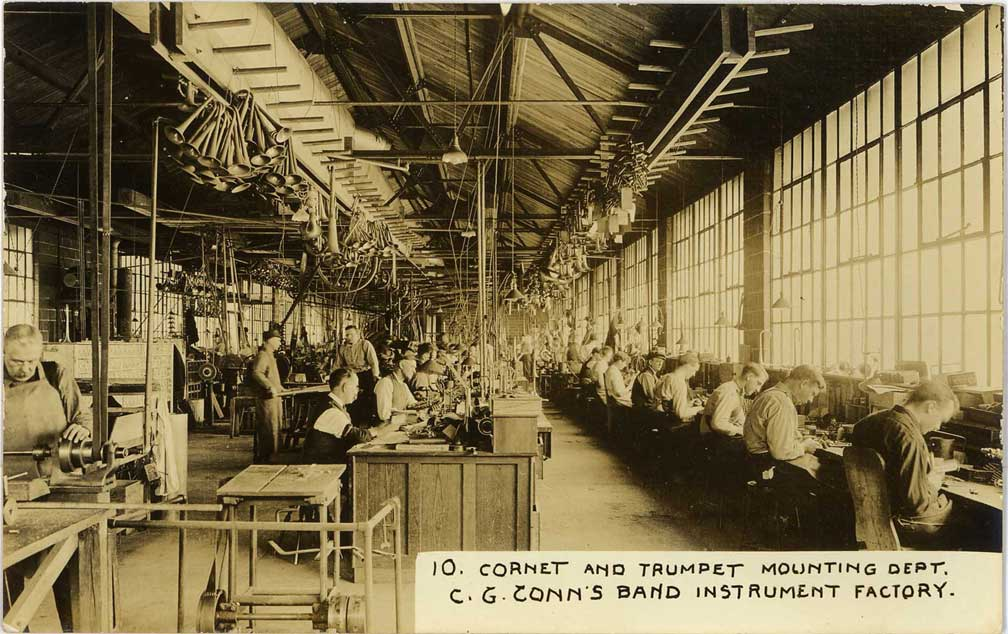
Cornet and trumpet mounting department

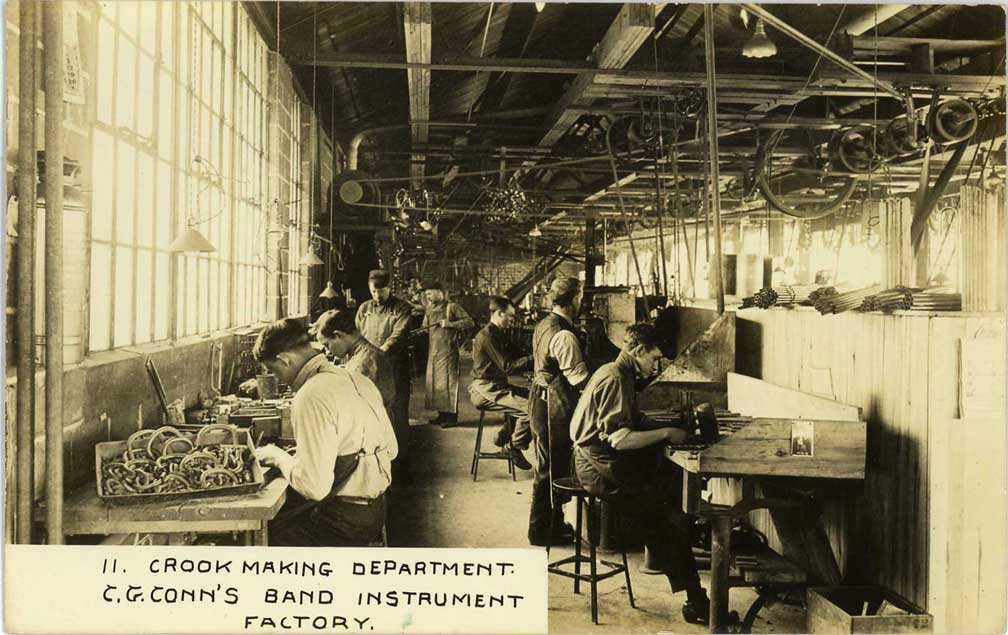
Crook making department

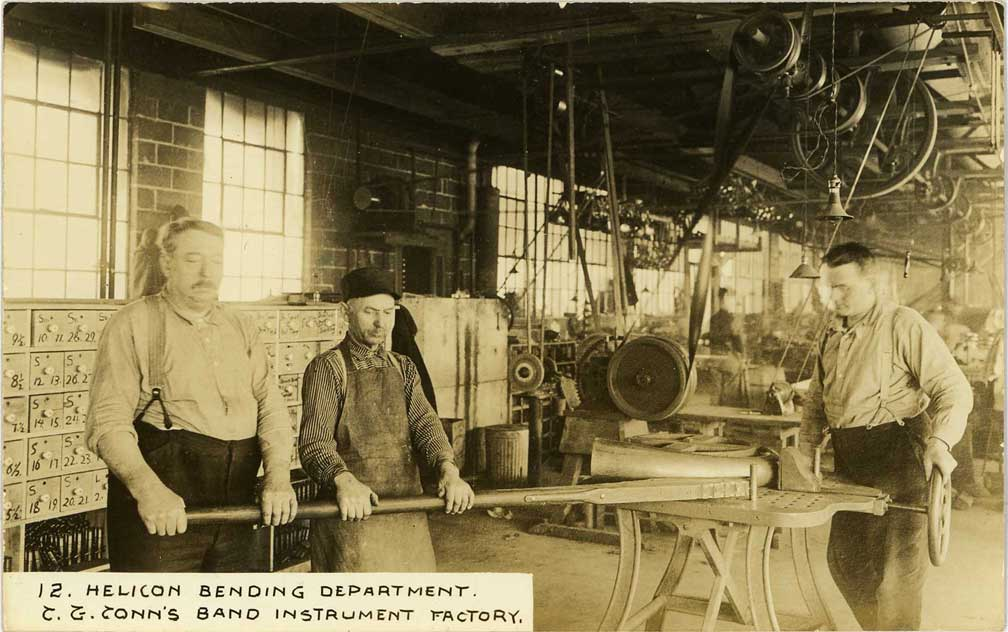
Helicon bending department

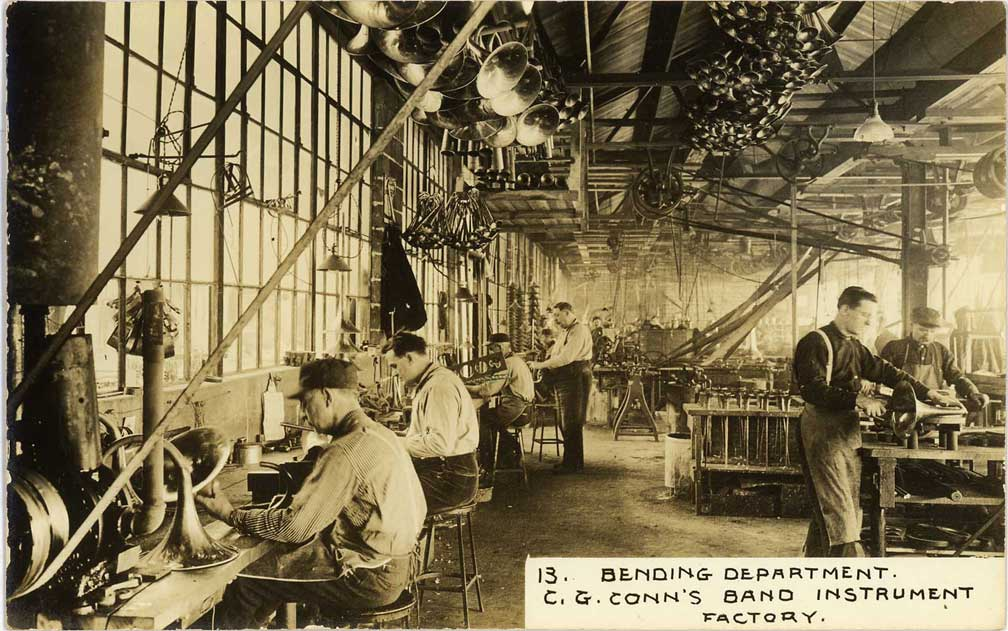
Bending department

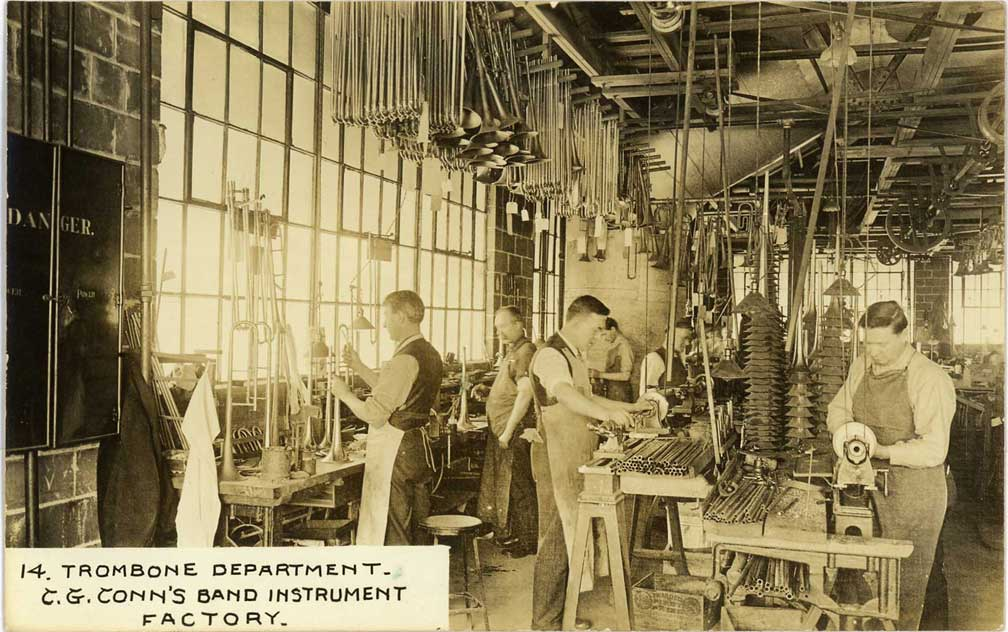
Trombone department

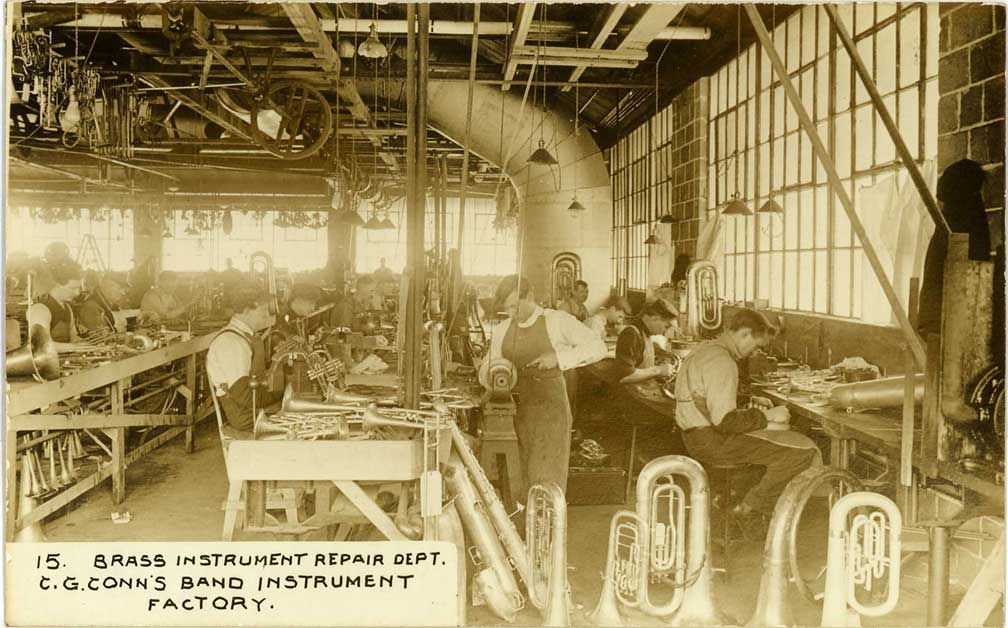
Brass instrument repair department

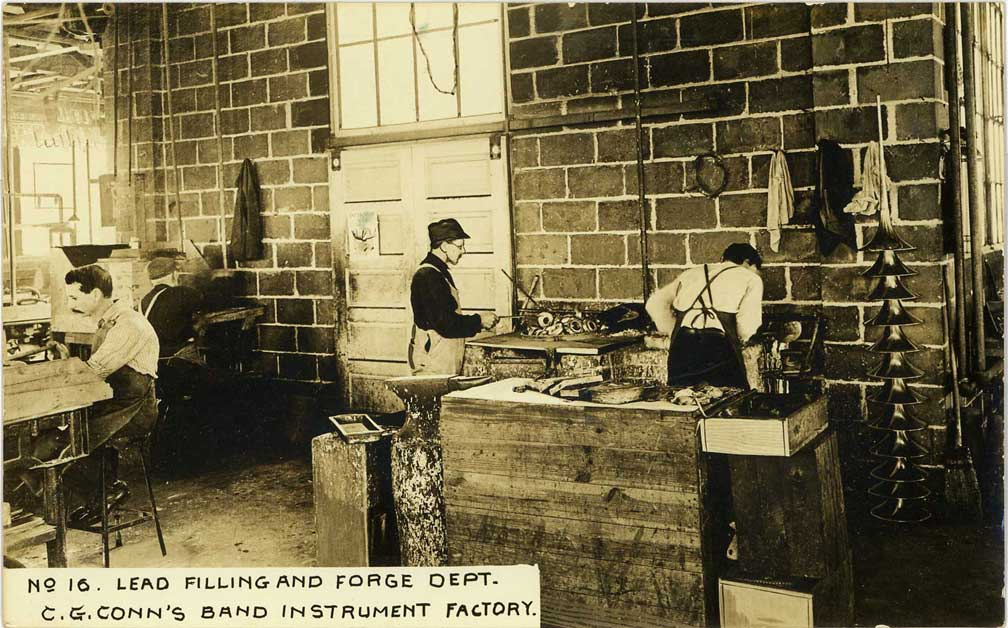
Lead filling and forge department

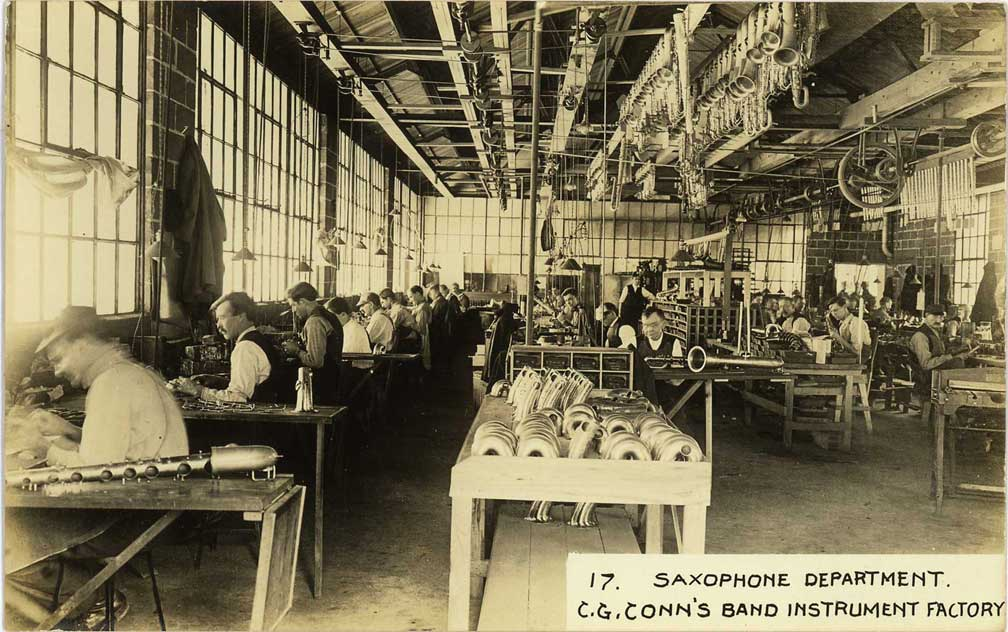
Saxophone department

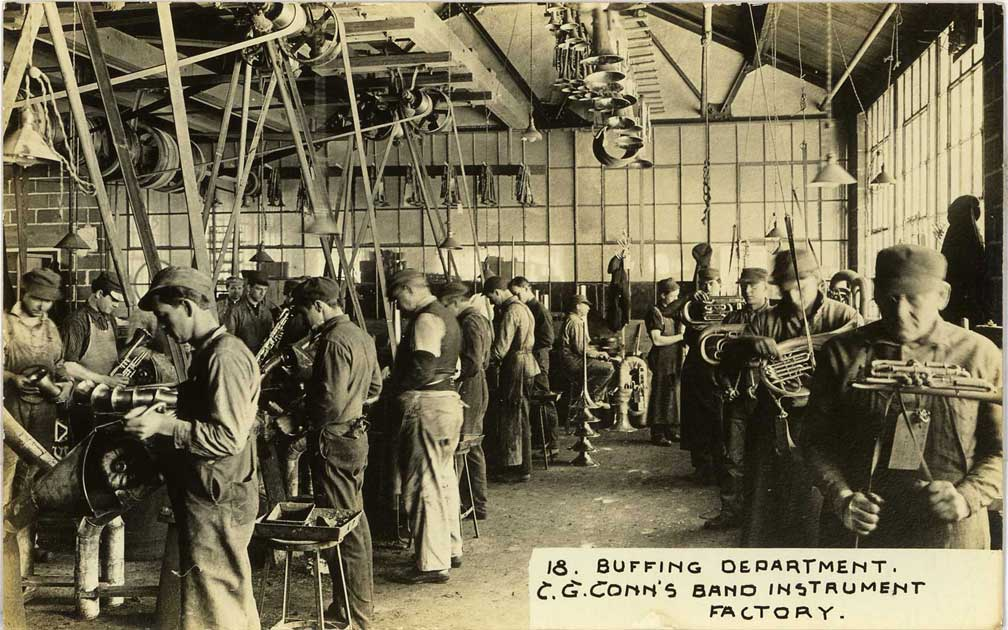
Buffing department

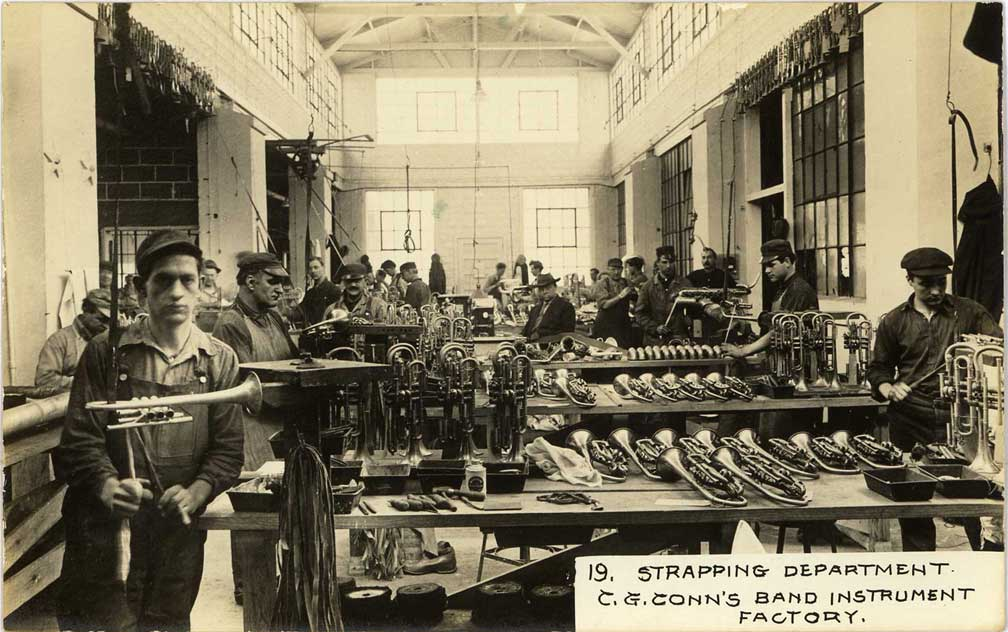
Strapping department

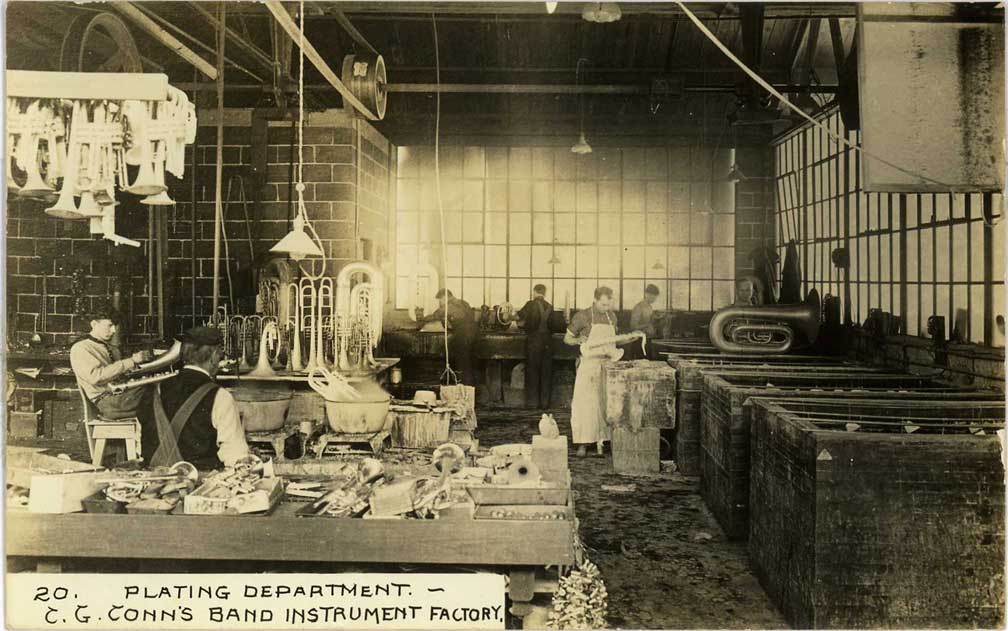
Plating department

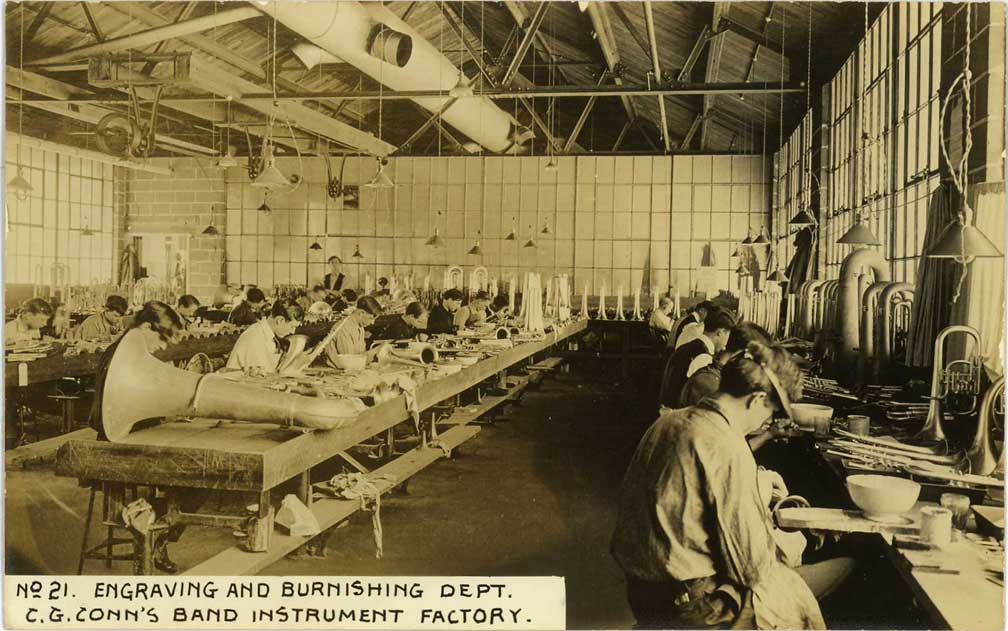
Engraving and burnishing department

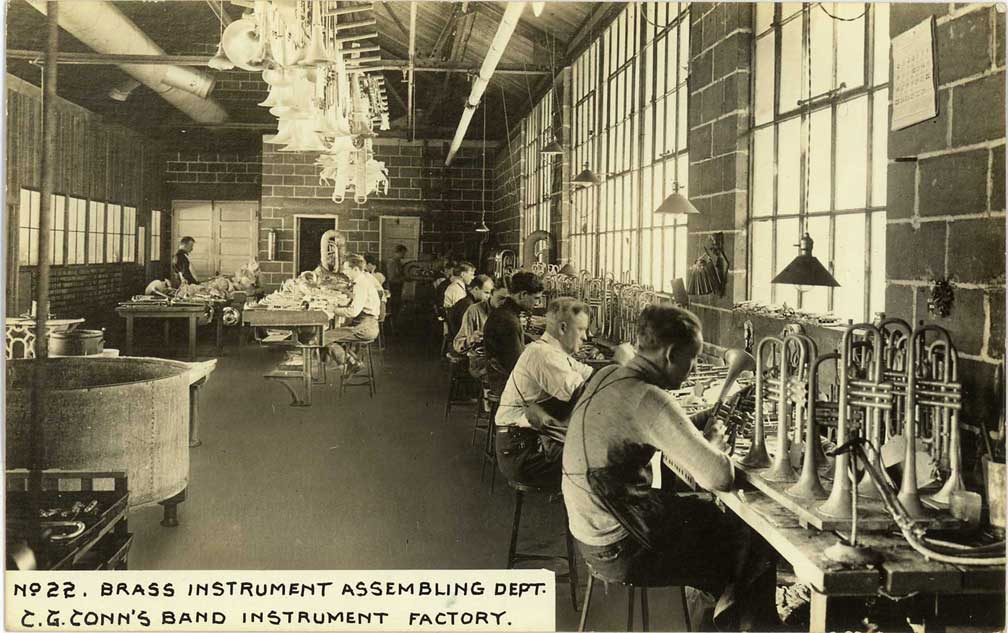
Brass instrument assembling department

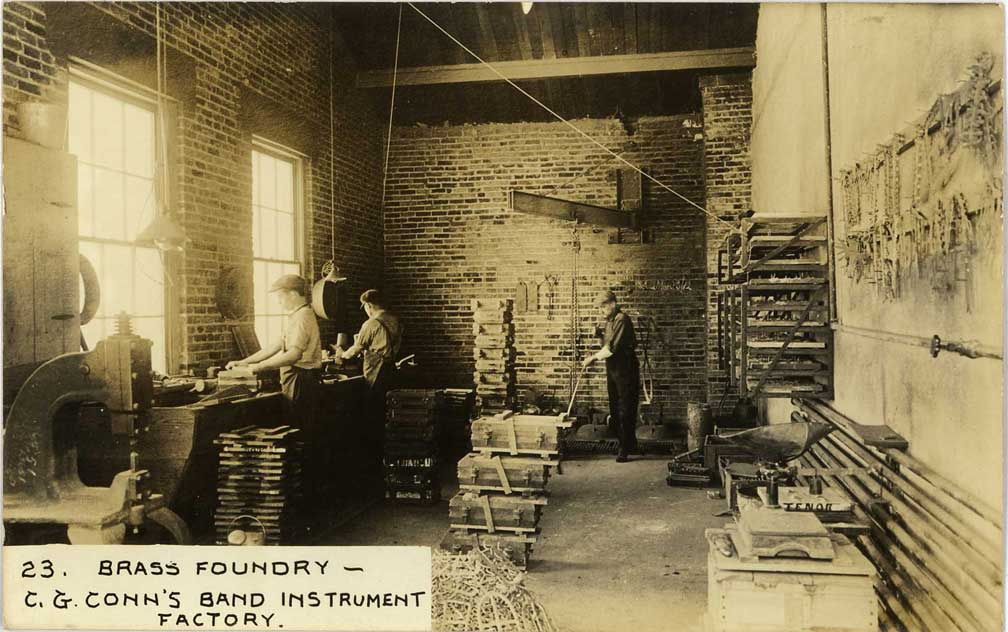
Brass foundry

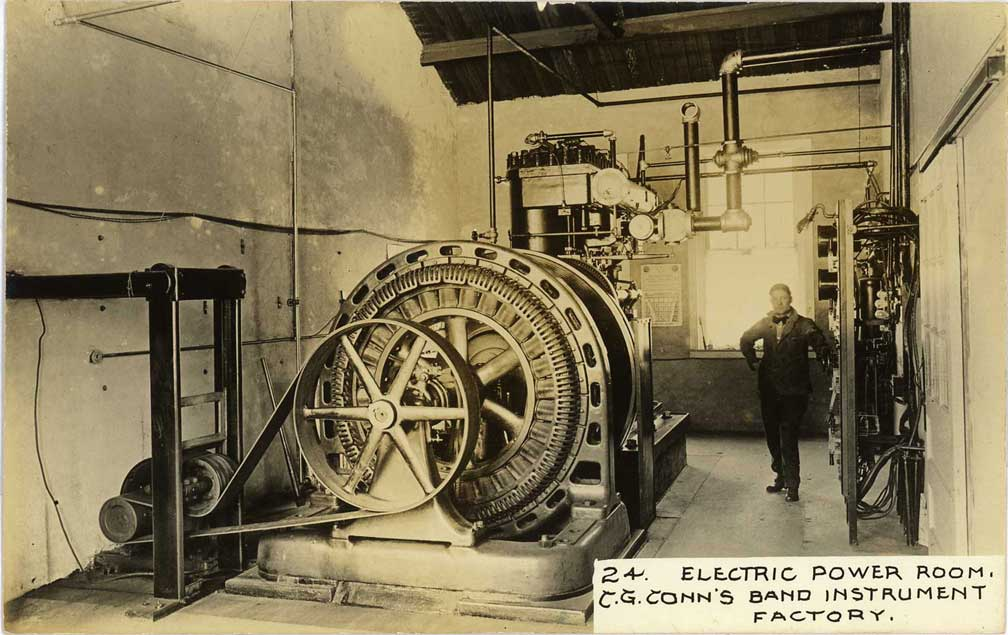
Electric power room

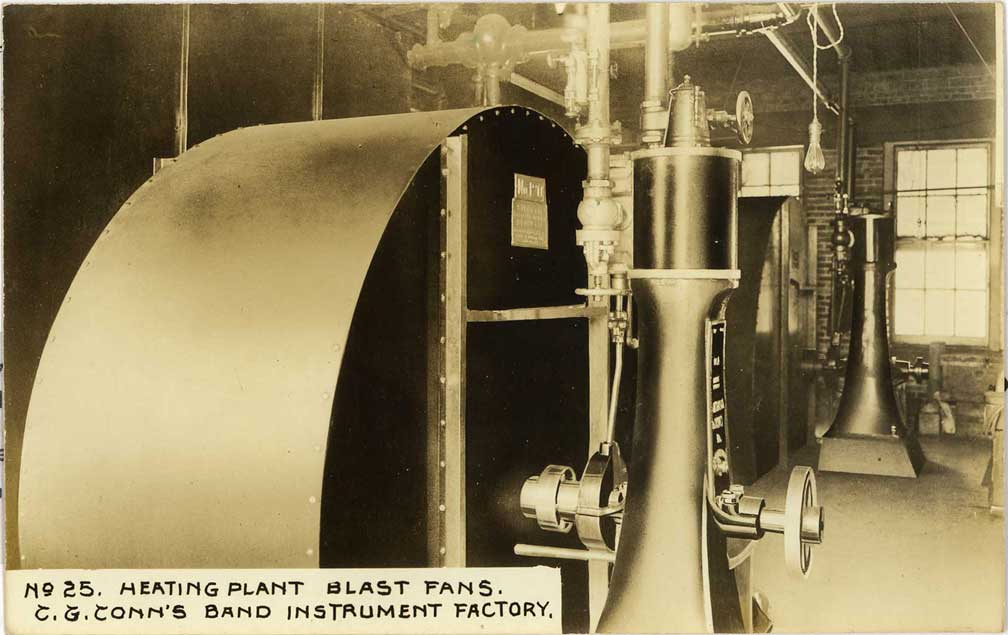
Heating plant blast fans

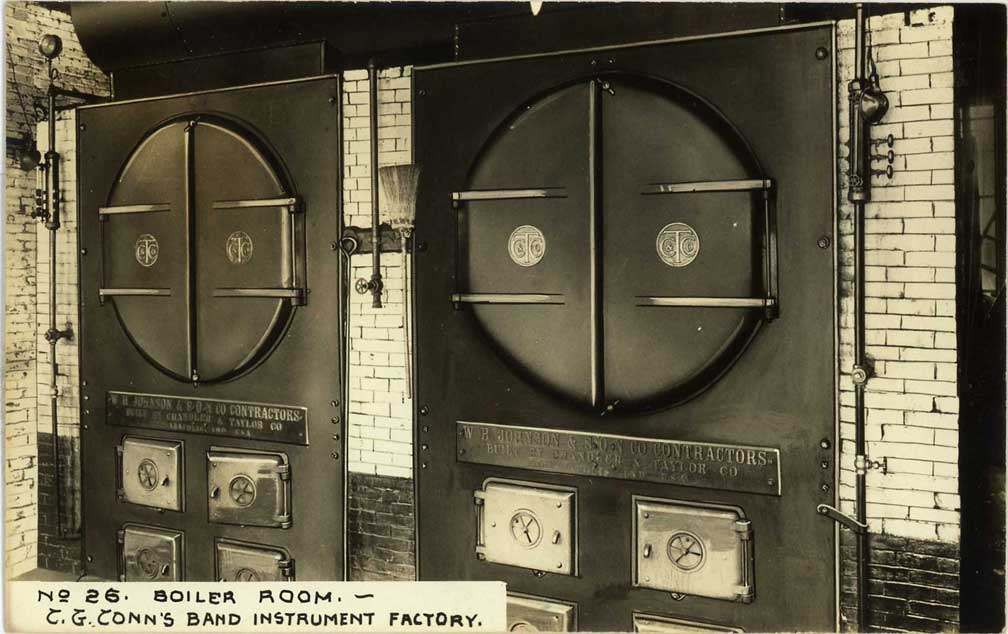
Boiler room

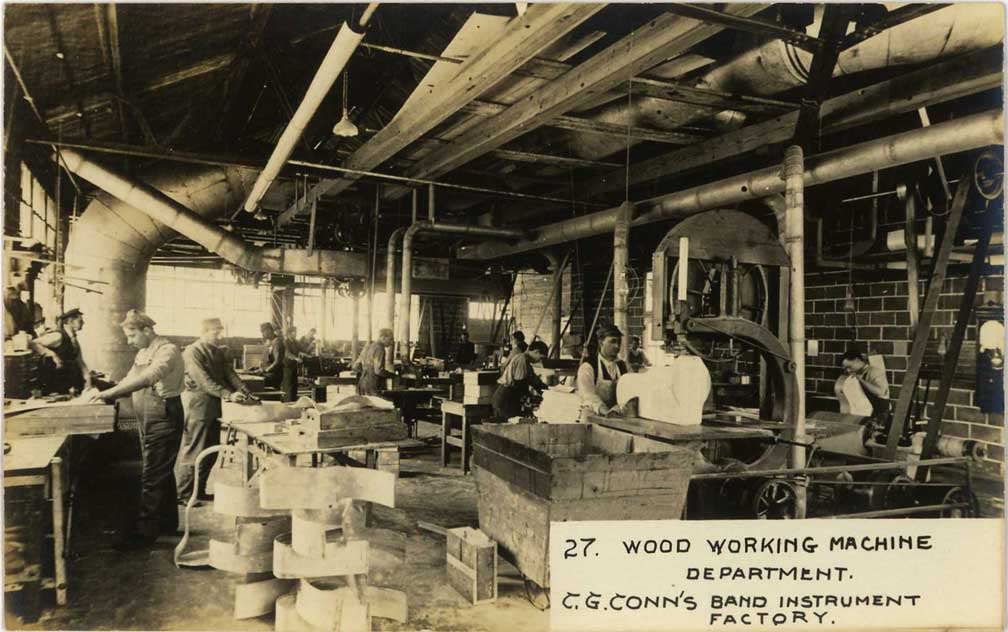
Wood working machine department

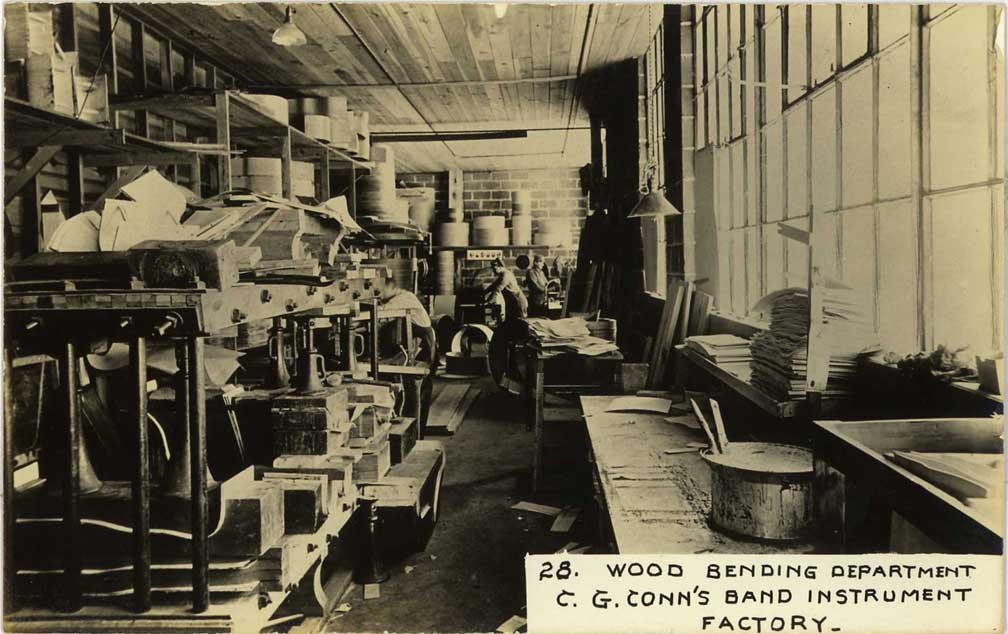
Wood bending department

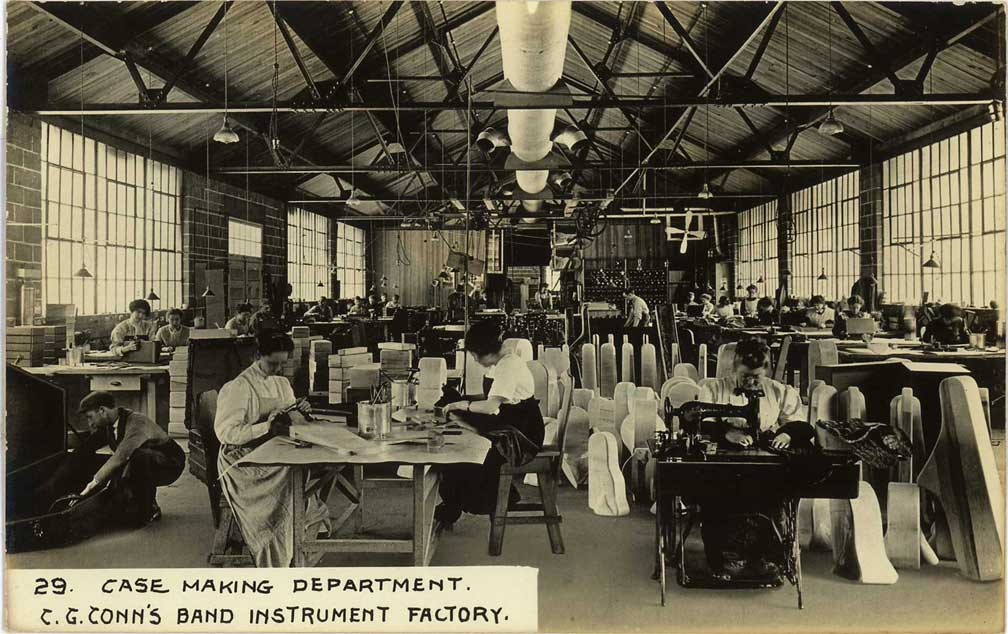
Case making department

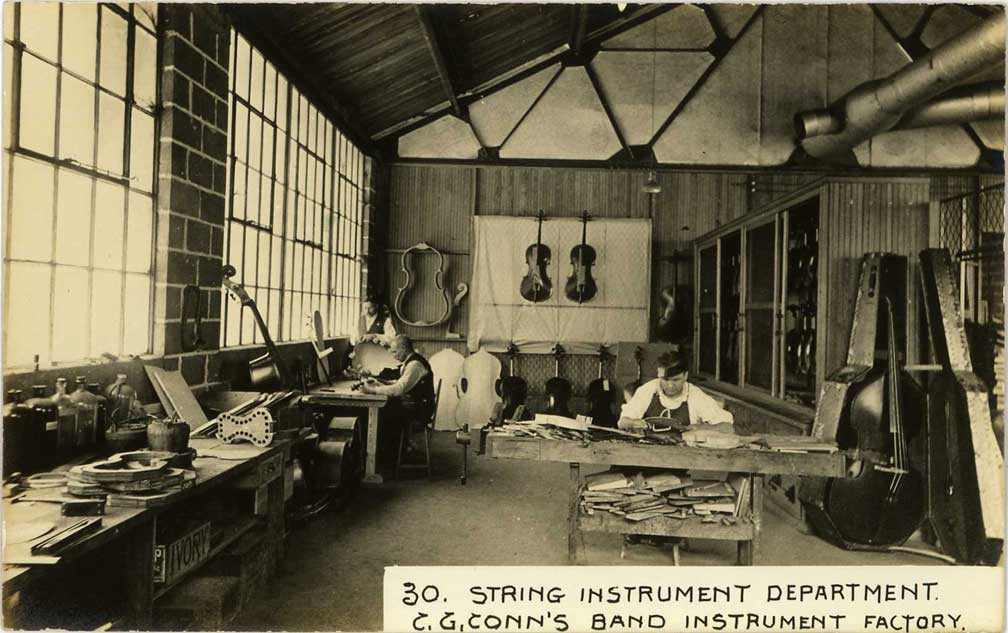
String instrument department

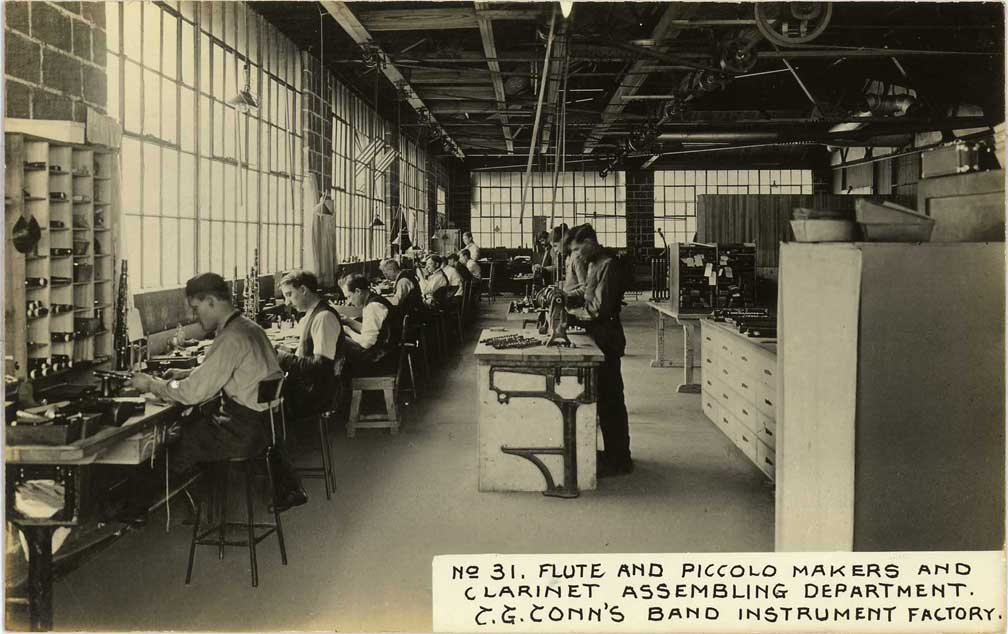
Flute and Piccolo makers and clarinet assembling department

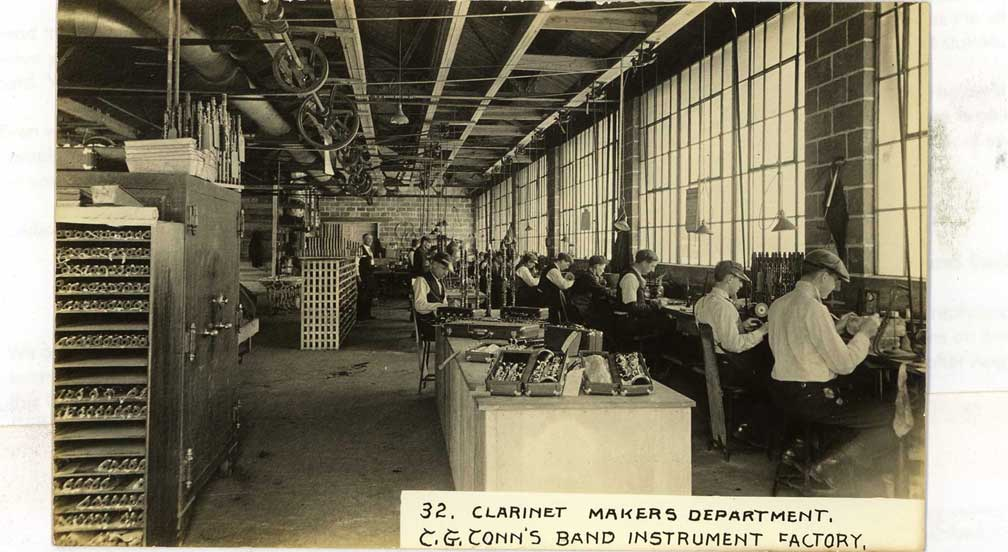
Clarinet makers department

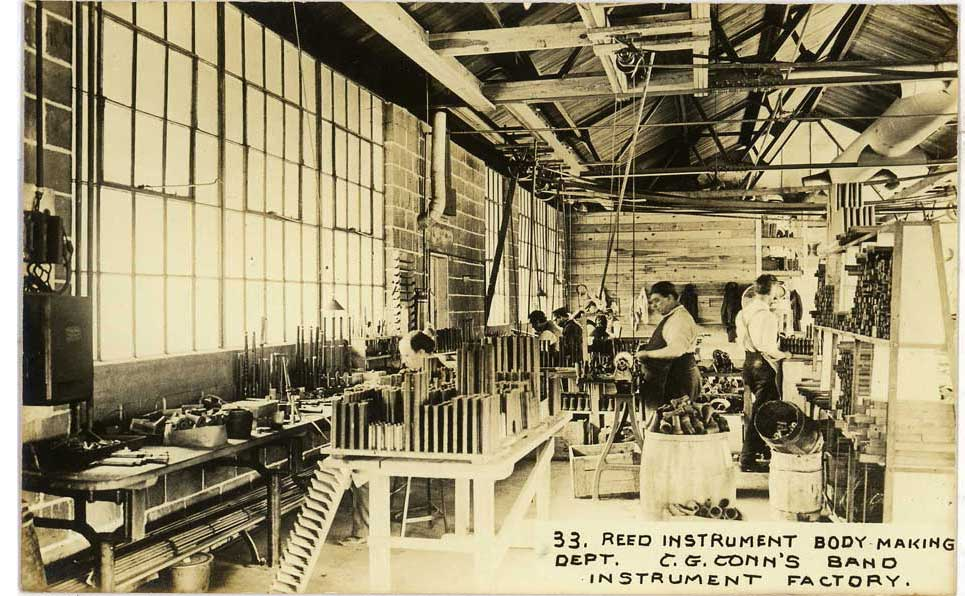
Reed instrument body making department

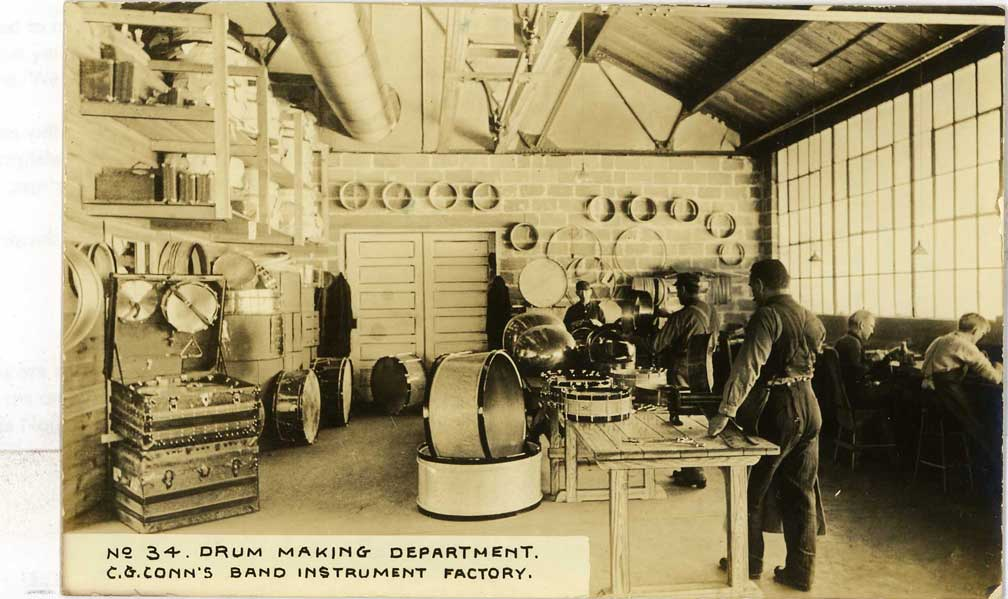
Drum making department

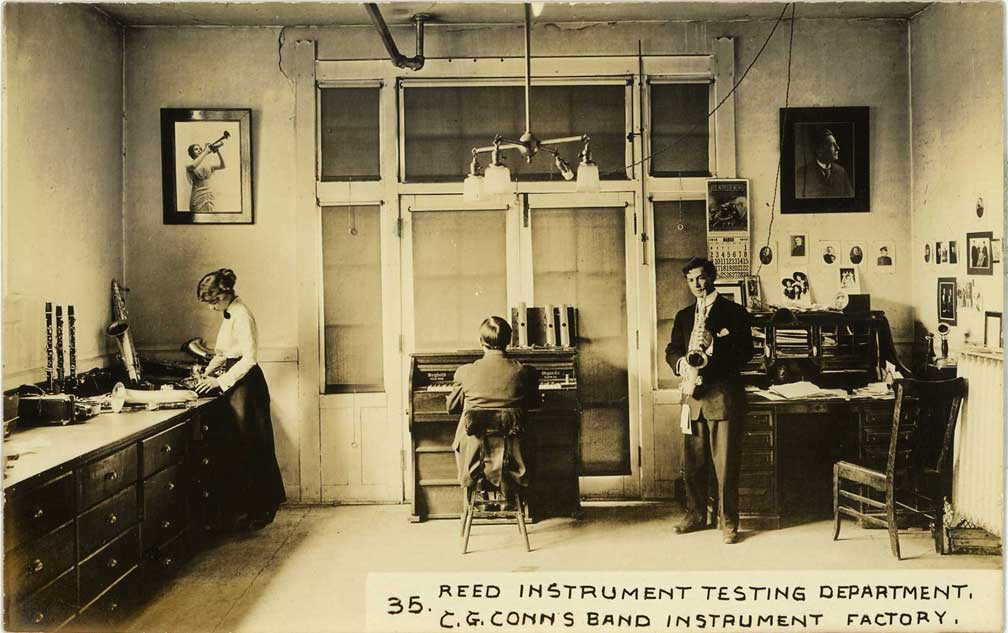
Reed instrument testing department

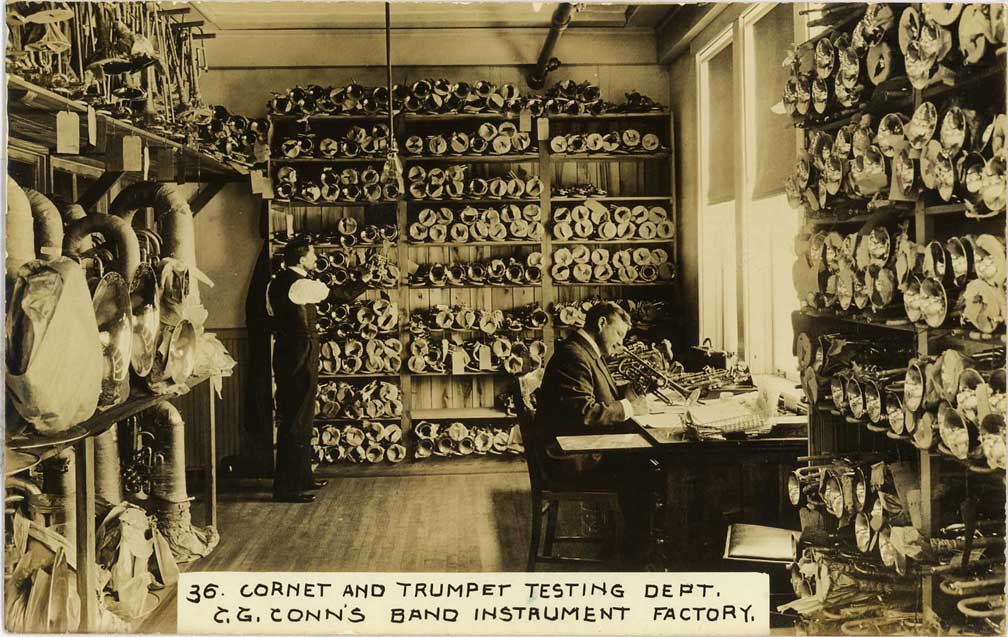
Cornet and trumpet testing department

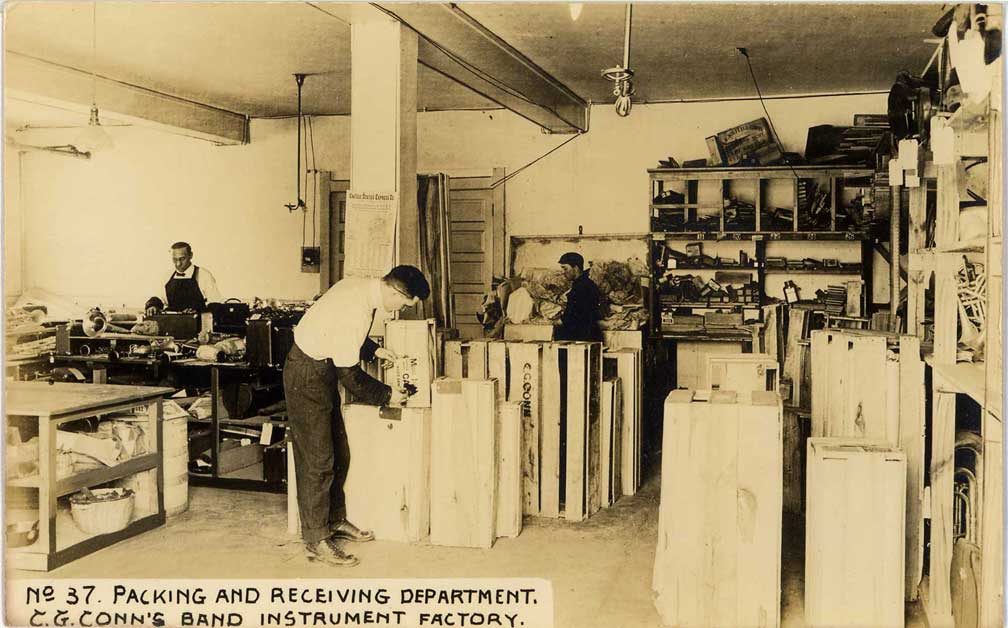
Packing and receiving department

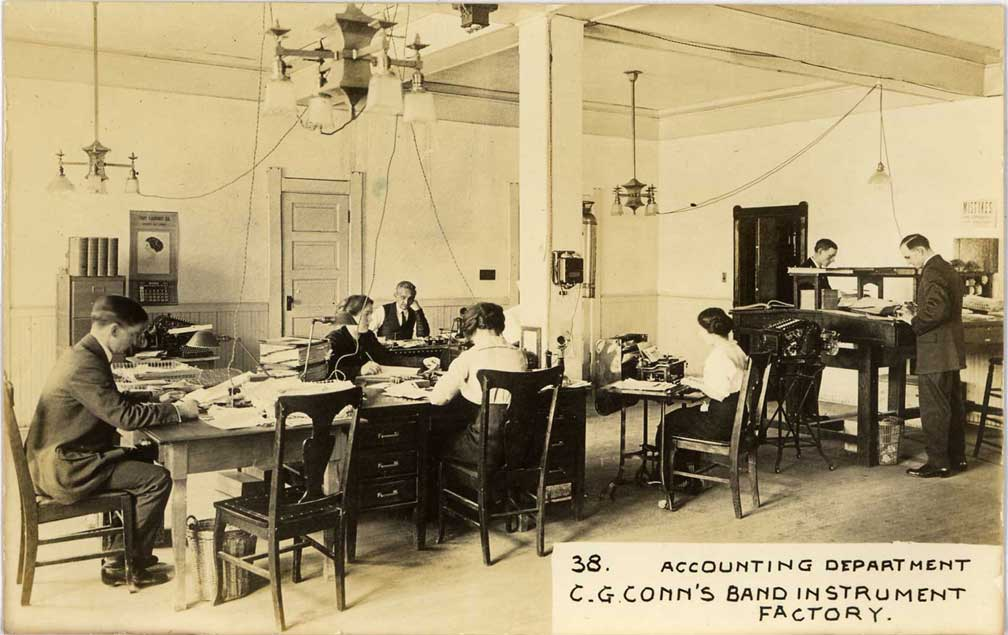
Accounting department

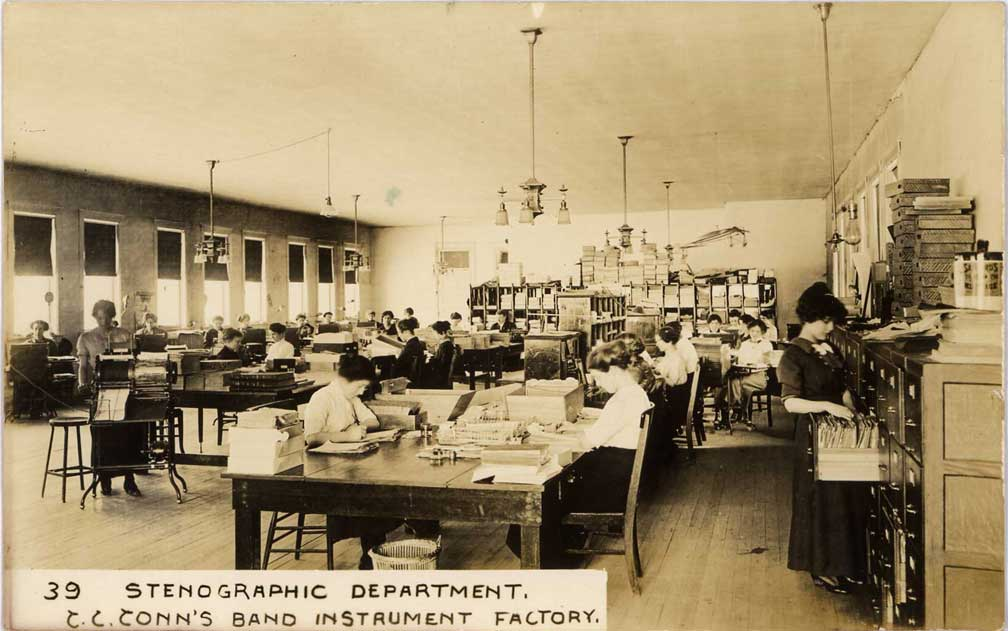
Stenographic department

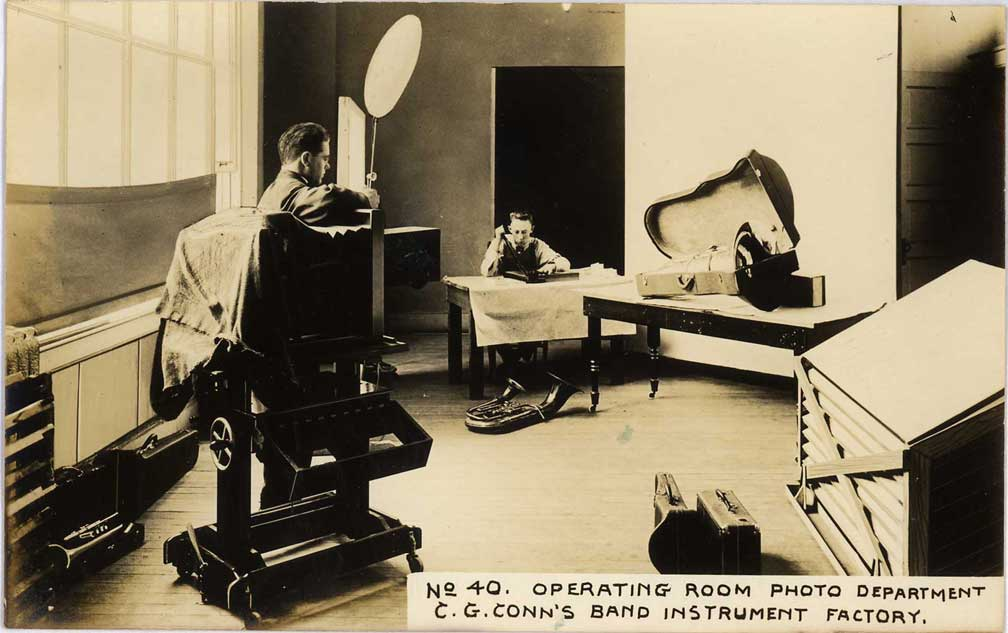
Operating room photo department

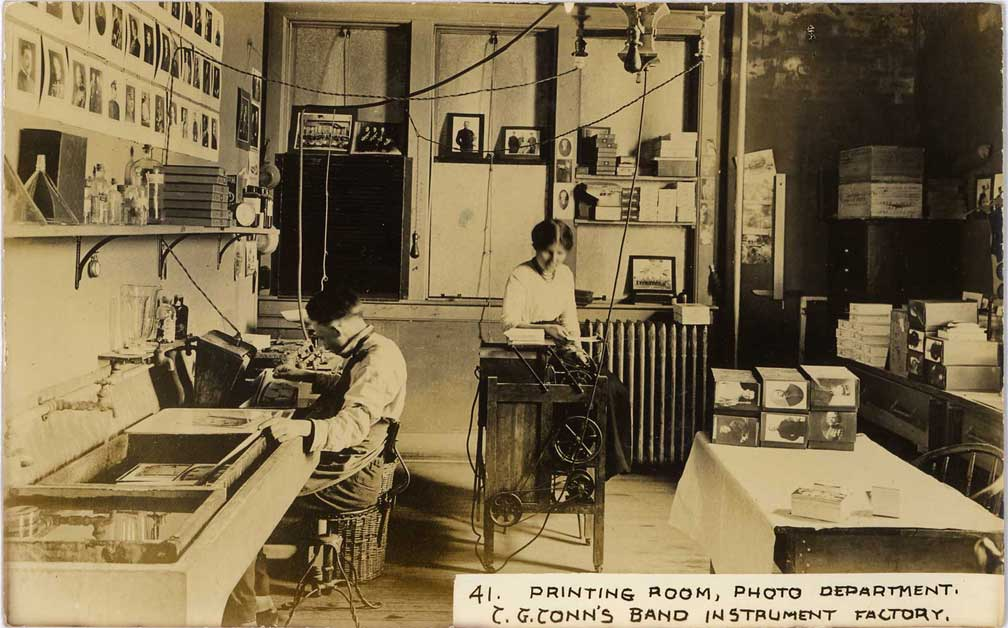
Printing room, photo department

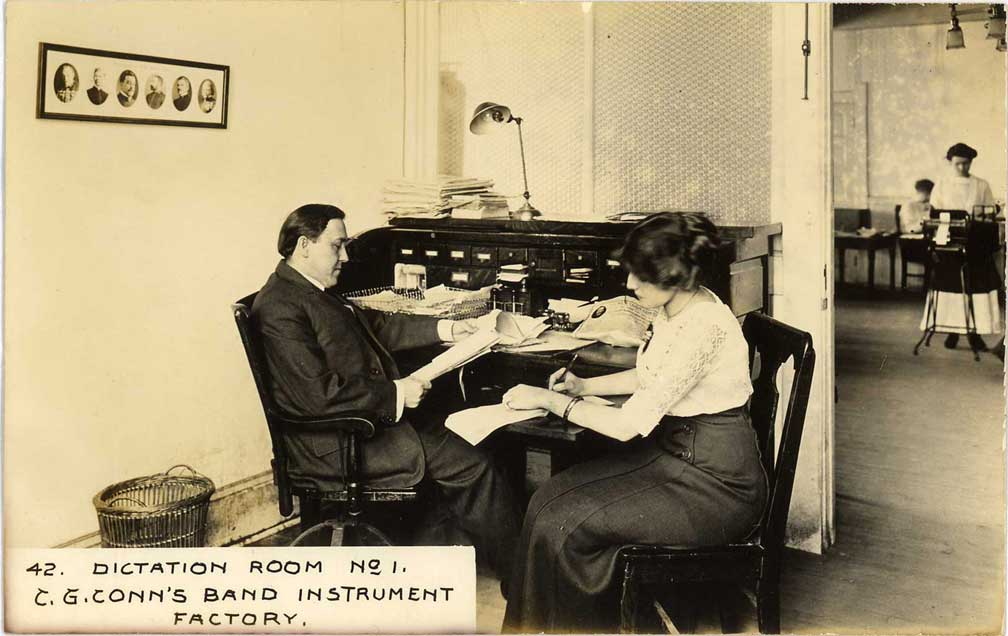
Dictation room number one

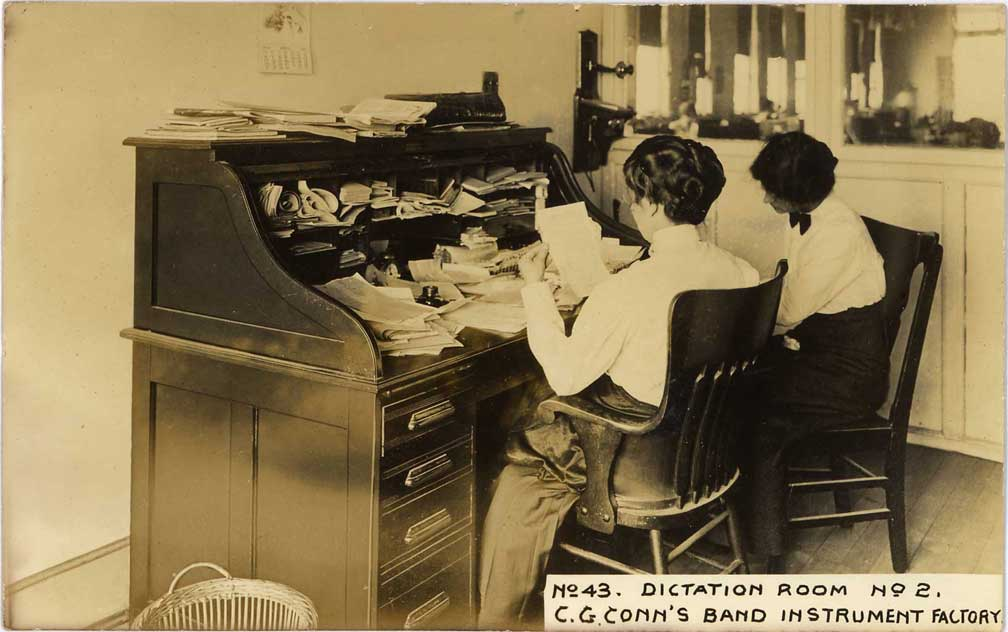
Dictation room number two

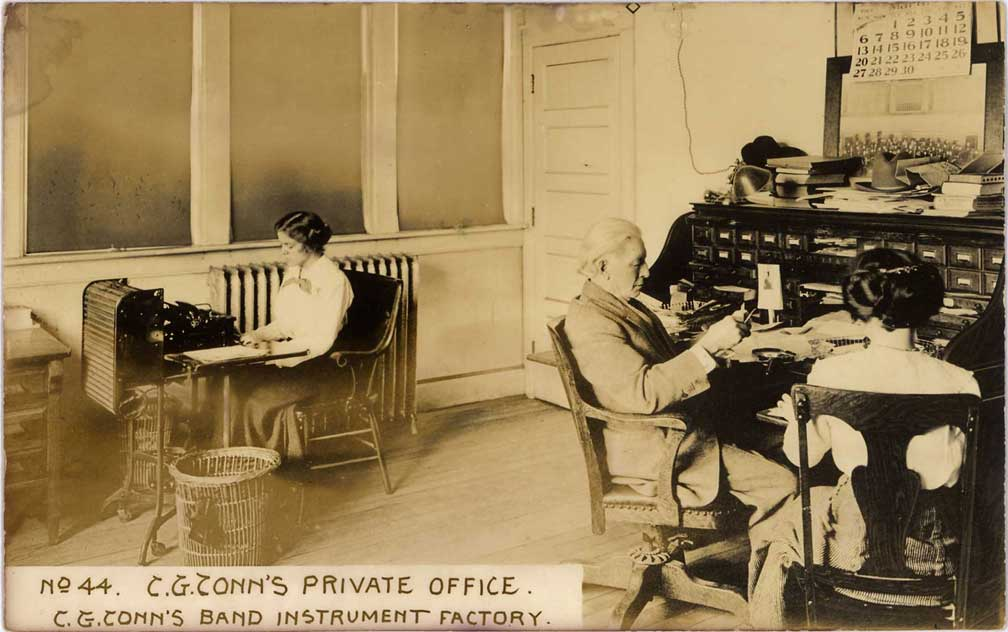
C.G.Conn's Private Office

== See also ==
- Buescher Band Instrument Company
- Martin Band Instrument Company
- York Band Instrument Company
- Mr. B Natural
