= E. A. Couturier =

E.A. Couturier
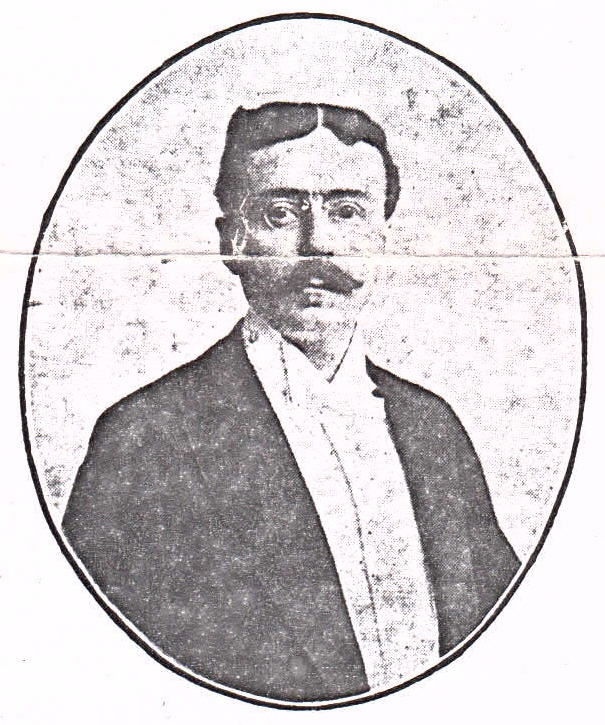
- EA Couturier as pictured above his endorsement in the Frank Holton Company's Summer 1909 Harmony Hints

Background information
- Also known as: EA Couturier
- Born: Ernst Albert Couturier; September 30, 1869; Poughkeepsie, New York, United States
- Died: February 28, 1950 (aged 80) Wingdale, New York, United States
- Genres: Concert Band
- Occupations: Cornetist, inventor
- Instrument: Cornet
- Years active: 1883 - 1940
- Label: Edison

Ernst Albert Couturier (September 30, 1869 in Poughkeepsie – February 28, 1950 in Wingdale) was best known as a cornet player who toured as a "virtuoso" performer on the concert programs of bands of the day. He promoted the Holton Band Instrument Company for a decade in that capacity before applying his own unique inventions to the production of his own line of brass band instruments between 1918 and 1923.

== Life ==
E.A. Couturier was born September 30, 1869, in Poughkeepsie, New York to a family with three other children. At the age of fourteen, he began playing the cornet. He entered the New England Conservatory of Music in 1885, but withdrew and took a job repairing watches in his uncle's shop. He began playing professionally in various bands in the 1880s and in 1890 began composing for band. In 1892, he became director of his first band and, in 1907, took a job at Frank Holton Company as a promoter of their instruments. He received his first patent (U.S. patent 1,073,593) on September 23, 1913, for a more conical bore cornet. In 1916 he opened his own manufacturing concern with two other partners to produce brass band instruments. That firm failed after Couturier lost his eyesight in 1923, was bought by Lyon and Healy, and ceased operations in 1929. Couturier suffered a mental breakdown and died on February 28, 1950, in the Harlem Valley Psychiatric Center in Wingdale, New York.

== Solo career ==
Couturier began as a piano and violin student, choosing cornet in 1883. By 1885, he was playing well enough to be accepted to the New England Conservatory. He was a student of Theodor Hoch, a proponent of placing all pressure on the lower lip, for four years. In the 1880s he began playing professionally in bands such as the Twenty-first Regiment Band, the Eastman Business College Band, Innes Band, and the Gilmore band. At age 17, he was able to play Herbert L. Clarke's Variations on Carnival of Venice, which is noted as a virtuoso piece with seemingly insurmountable technical difficulties, and developed a six octave range. In 1902, he made his first tour as a feature act soloist playing a Conn Wonder cornet across several Midwestern states. In 1906, he toured Europe where he also demonstrated multiphonics, the production of more than one note at the same time on an airophone, which according to The American History and Encyclopedia of Music is not possible on cornet. The Frank Holton Company then hired Couturier to perform on, consult in the development of, and promote Holton cornets. The Holton New Model cornet was sold under the name "Couturier New Model" in the 1910s. Business matters were distracted from Couturier's playing for several years. Still, after the loss of his own company in 1923, he began playing again in Los Angeles until 1929 when he returned to Mt. Vernon New York.

== Composer and Conductor ==
Couturier did not devote much of his career to composition, but did author several works. Among these are The Maine's Avenger March, The First Commander March, and The Van der Veer Two Step. In 1882, he directed a band of his own, and he also stepped in as director of the Gilmore Band in 1898.

== E.A. Couturier Co., Ltd. ==
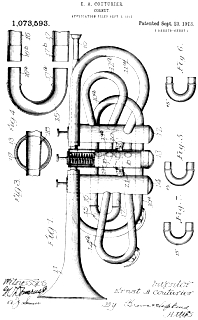
1913 patent referenced on #3939.

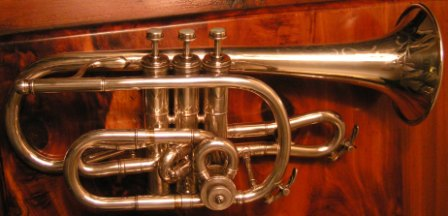
Couturier cornet #3939 built in 1919 with a York-inspired predecessor to his 1922 patented quick-change Bb/A rotary valve and adjustable valve slides.

After resigning from Holton in 1913, achieving his first patent, and seeing that patent built by the J.W. York company as the Couturier Wizard Model, Ernst Albert Couturier bought the derelict William Seidel Band Instrument Company and renamed it. He did so with two partners, Melvin G. Lathrop and William N. Barlow. His company built a full line of brass band instruments in the conical bore style as well as a saxophone. In 1918 the firm moved from New York City to La Porte, Indiana where the bulk of the instruments bearing the company name were made. In 1923 Couturier's eyesight failed and shortly after the company went into receivership and was sold to Lyon & Healy. In 1928 Lyon & Healy sold the band instruments division to the Frank Holton Company which halted production of Couturier instruments in 1929. Instruments built under Couturier's control between 1918 and 1923 can be identified by serial numbers ranging from 1000 to 9500.

Couturier was known to say, "After training for breath control and technical perfection, why must we remain at the mercy of inferior instruments?” Couturier turned to instrument design to address that problem, as did Vincent Bach, Elden Benge, Renold Schilke and Jerome Callet.

The continuous conical bore construction patented by Couturier was a core principle in his designs. E.A. Couturier company was known for the unique shape of the valve tubing, which, in its original and purest form did not support any tuning slide for fine pitch adjustment. This design was to support the most continuously conical bore possible and also offered less resistance to air flow through the horn. Slides, when present, continued a conical progression by varying the wall thickness in order to achieve a movable cylindrical exterior. Those instruments built without valve slides tasked the players to bend some notes using their lips and also to rotate the horn to free the instrument of condensation during rests. The Couturier cornet was typically available in a Bb/A model with a rotary valve for selecting the key of the horn while other makers of the era such as H.N. White used interchangeable tuning slides. Couturier and the company received numerous patents for conical bore instruments, a phonograph, the A/B-flat "quick change valve", and a mute design.
