= Ethel Merker =

American freelance and orchestral horn player

- Born: Kathryn Ethel Merker; 1923; Chicago, Illinois, United States
- Died: 2012 (aged 88–89)
- Genres: Classical; jazz; pop
- Occupation: Musician
- Instrument: Horn

K. Ethel Merker (1923–2012) was a prominent freelance and orchestral horn player in Chicago, who collaborated with the Frank Holton Company on the design and development of the Merker-Matic line of horns.

== Early life and education ==
Kathryn Ethel Merker, known as Ethel, grew up in Chicago Heights, Illinois. She studied piano when she was young. In the third grade, Merker began playing horn. She studied horn with Max Pottag throughout high school, and later with Philip Farkas and Arnold Jacobs, all members of the Chicago Symphony Orchestra. Merker earned two degrees from Northwestern University: a bachelor of music education in 1946 and a master of music in 1947.

== Career ==
Merker performed as an orchestral horn player as well as in jazz, pop, and commercial settings. Beginning at age eighteen, she played principal horn in the Chicago NBC Radio Orchestra from 1941 to 1950, where she was the only woman. She held this position while attending Northwestern University. Merker later played with the Chicago Symphony, where she played alongside her teacher Philip Farkas. She also played with the Chicago Pops, Chicago Lyric Opera, Milwaukee Symphony, Berlin Radio Orchestra, New York City Ballet, New York City Opera, and the Boston Pops orchestras.

Merker performed with popular artists including Barbra Streisand, Ramsey Lewis, Quincy Jones, the Jackson Five, and John Denver. She recorded on popular albums including those released by the Rolling Stones, Smothers Brothers, and Diana Ross and The Supremes. Vocalist Peggy Lee insisted on including Ethel in her backing orchestra, which Lee termed her "20-man-and-Ethel-band." Singer-songwriter Johnny Mathis called Merker his favorite horn player.

Commercially, Merker recorded jingles for Marlboro, Coca-Cola, McDonald's, Budweiser, and United Airlines. At Chicago's Universal Studios, a band set-up that became known as the "Ethel Merker Flying Wedge" arranged Merker on horn in the front of the band, with additional rows behind her of two trombones, three trumpets, four woodwinds, five rhythm, six violins, and seven low strings.

Merker is the only woman to have her embouchure featured in the book Photo Study of 40 Virtuoso Horn Players' Embouchures, published in 1970 by Philip Farkas.

In the early 1990s, Merker worked on the design and development of new models of horns with the Frank Holton Company, resulting in Holton's release of the Ethel Merker "Merker-Matic" series of horn models. The Merker-Matic was a Kruspe-wrap dual bore double horn that offered a variety of bell options and featured mechanical valve linkages. The Merker series horns are now discontinued.

Merker taught at Indiana University, DePaul University, the VanderCook College of Music, Northwestern University, and Valparaiso University. Her students included Former Professor of Horn at the University of Cincinnati College Conservatory of Music and Former Second Horn of the Philadelphia Orchestra Randy Gardner, American horn player and historical horn maker Lowell Greer, and Associate Principal Horn of the Minnesota Orchestra Herbert Winslow.

== Awards ==
- Honorary Doctor of Music degree, Vandercook College of Music, 1995
- Pioneer Award, International Women's Brass Conference, 2000
- Elected Honorary Member, International Horn Society, 2009

== See also ==
- Holton-Farkas Horns
