= Seidel Band Instrument Company =

The Seidel Band Instrument Company was a short-lived manufacturer of musical instruments located in Elkhart, Indiana.

== History ==
The company was founded by William Seidel (b Markneukirchen, Germany 30 Nov 1848; d Elkhart 5 Aug 1922). Markneukirchen, lying on the border of the Czech Republic is one of the leading centers of musical instrument manufacturing in Europe. At the age of fourteen Seidel apprenticed as a horn maker in accordance with German custom. Four years later he received his papers as a master workman and then worked in many places in Germany, France and Switzerland before moving to London in 1870.

In 1881 C.G. Conn visited London and induced Seidel to join his business in Elkhart. Seidel was Conn's shop foreman through 1913. In that year he became too ill to work and left the company. Previous to 1913 he must have been tooling for his own operation, because in 1914 he founded the Seidel Band Instrument Company. The company did not perform to his expectations, and in 1918 he sold it to the cornet virtuoso Ernest A. Couturier.

Couturier had patented his own cornet design in 1913. His first horns were built by Frank Holton of Chicago and later by the J.W. York Band Instrument Company in Grand Rapids. In 1916 he opened his first factory in New York. When he bought Seidel's operation, he moved the New York operation to Elkhart combining the two operations together and was known as the E. A. Couturier Band Instrument Company. Late in 1918 Couturier moved his company to Laporte, Indiana but retained the finishing department in Elkhart.

For a few months Seidel worked in Laporte but soon returned to Elkhart. He was working for Buescher in 1920 as a repairman and in early 1922 as a horn maker for Conn. Then his health began to deteriorate, and he began to lose his eyesight. Depressed with his physical state and his inability to retain employment, he went to a park near his home and took his own life. In 1923 Couturier lost his eyesight, and his company was sold to Lyon & Healy of Chicago who closed that operation in 1929.
