= Victor Salvi =

American-Italian musician

- Born: March 4, 1920; Chicago, Illinois, U.S.
- Died: May 10, 2015 (aged 95); Milan, Italy
- Occupation(s): Harpist, harp maker
- Years active: 1941–2015
- Children: Marco Salvi; Nicoletta Salvi; Victor Salvi Jr. Ana Salvi

Victor Salvi (\ˈvik-tər\ \ˈsal-vē \); (March 4, 1920 – May 10, 2015) was an American-born Italian harpist, harp maker, and entrepreneur. Salvi, who has been called "harpmaker of the world". Born in Chicago, Illinois, he immigrated back to Italy several years into his professional career. Credited for transforming the harp industry, he began his career as a musician, and turned to building harps.

As a musician, Victor Salvi played under some of the best known conductors of the twentieth century, including Dimitri Mitropoulos, Arturo Toscanini, and Bruno Walter. As a businessman, Salvi merged markets between his Europe-based Salvi Harps and the United States company Lyon & Healy, which he acquired in 1987. As an engineer, Salvi is responsible for the largest modern progressions of the instrument. Philanthropically, he has sponsored multiple competitions, concerts, as well as commissioning harp compositions. Salvi has expanded the harp's notoriety worldwide, raising the instrument's profile, and heightening its importance musically.

== Early life ==
Victor Salvi was born into an Italian family and was the youngest child of Rodolfo Salvi and Apollonia Paoliello. Rodolfo was himself a musician and an instrument maker from Venice, who moved to the small Southern village of Viggiano, Basilicata, land of travelling musicians who brought their music and traditions all over the world, as well as known for the construction of harps.

Rodolfo married his second wife Apollonia, the granddaughter of Vincenzo Bellizia, a well known harp maker of the Kingdom of the Two Sicilies. Rodolfo left Viggiano and brought the family to the United States in 1909, and once based in Chicago, Victor was born. Victor’s siblings were Livia, Aida, Giovanni, and his half-brother, Alberto, the oldest.

The Salvis were a musical family, and Alberto was a distinguished concert harpist in the 1920s. Victor’s older sister, Aida, was also an active musician in Chicago, including with the Civic Opera. Aida learned the instrument from Alberto, and Aida passed her knowledge on to Victor. Victor Salvi attended Marshall High School in Chicago. While there, he won a national harp competition and a scholarship to the Interlochen Center for the Arts.

Salvi enlisted in the U.S. Navy during World War II. He was inducted at the Naval Air Station Glenview in 1942. There, he was the harpist in the U.S. Navy Band until 1946.

== Career ==
=== Early career ===
After the war, Salvi returned to Chicago and joined conductor Paul Schreiber's St. Louis Sinfonietta orchestra, with whom Salvi toured the country as a soloist from 1948 to 1950. Described by Columbia Artist Management as having been founded with "... the purpose of bringing symphonic music to audiences everywhere", Sinfonietta was a distinctively unique ensemble, "... a chamber orchestra which would have not only the delicacy and refinement of the stringed instruments, but a reasonable degree of the extended tonal altitude, color variety and sonority of the symphony orchestra – an ensemble whose instrumentation would permit equally authoritative presentation of the classic symphonies ...." While touring with the orchestra, Salvi, following in his father's footsteps, taught himself harp repair and set up a workshop in Chicago, beginning his work as a mechanic and engineer.

In 1950, Salvi secured a New York-based job playing in Gian Carlo Menotti's Consul, which ran on Broadway for nearly a year. He continued playing in Menotti's next work, The Saint of Bleecker Street, in 1954, also on Broadway.

Once established in New York, Salvi took a job with the New York Philharmonic, conducted by Dimitri Mitropoulos, and the NBC Symphony Orchestra under Arturo Toscanini. He played under several other acclaimed conductors including Bruno Walter, Leopold Stokowski, and George Szell. Salvi recorded Debussy La Mer with the NBC Symphony Orchestra in 1950, produced by RCA.

As in Chicago, Salvi opened a harp workshop business in New York City, first in the West 40s, later moving to West 54th Street. In 1954, he built his first harp in New York – a small, orchestral model. "Playing the harp in orchestras you get a lot of measures of rest, time to think about how the instrument is constructed and how it could be improved", Salvi told the New York Times in a 2005 interview. Ultimately, Salvi had to choose between either performing or the building of harps. He chose the latter, and moved to Europe where he knew he would have more affordable and skilled craftsmanship.

=== Salvi Harps ===
In 1955, Salvi moved to Italy, and established a harp business in Genoa. There, he recruited a staff of twelve cabinetmakers and other similar craftsmen, and "... a workshop was set up in a fifteenth century villa, reputedly once owned by the famed Genoese Admiral Andrea Doria." The harps went on public sale that same year. "The finishing of a new harp," Mr. Salvi comments, "... is always an event, no matter how many times it has happened. Everyone gathers round to admire and inspect the completed task, and we all are happy and proud that another harp has been made." In 1965, the company acquired a larger working space in Vignole Borbera. In 1969, Salvi opened two additional locations: a shop for distribution and repairs in Covent Garden, London, named Holywell Music; and a factory in Sainte Croix, Switzerland, called Les Arts Mecaniques, for mechanics, strings, and other instrument improvements, "... where craftsmen trained in making watches, mechanical music boxes and automatons took over the mechanical aspects of the harp’s construction." Slowly, "... more and more harpists in Europe and the United States became aware of the new Salvi harp and it started making appearances in symphony orchestras, schools and private studios alike." In fact, in the 1970s, the Paris National Opera Orchestra played with five Salvi harps.

In 1974, Salvi moved the Italian-based factory to Piasco, where Salvi Harps remains in business today. Salvi chose Piasco, part of the Piemonte area, for the quality of the local craftsmen. To this day, Salvi Harps is the leading manufacturer in the European market. Each harp is still individually handcrafted. The factory is a focal point of the region, and attracts many visitors each year, and regularly opens itself for tours to schoolchildren to learn about harp making.

=== Acquisition of Lyon & Healy ===
In 1987, Salvi acquired his main competition, the American-based harp company Lyon & Healy. In an interview with Jane B. Weidensaul in American Harp Journal, Salvi said:

I heard around June 1987 on the 'grapevine' that Lyon & Healy was again on the market and, after great deliberation and consultation with my advisors, made a bid on behalf of Les Arts Mecaniques, which I am happy to say was accepted. As to the motivation, Lyon & Healy was always a formidable company with its many years of making fine quality harps. However, I do believe that L & H suffered in the past from these various take-overs by companies which did not fully understand the harp and its problems. Salvi Harps will benefit greatly in that we will be distributed by Lyon & Healy – a well-established and prestigious company – in the USA. By the same token, L & H will benefit by being available through the Salvi outlets in Europe. Therefore, this ‘marriage’ between Salvi and L & H seemed the most sensible solution since the two companies can help each other out to make one complete and strong whole.

=== Innovations to the Instrument and Harp Technology ===
Throughout his career, Salvi devoted his time to perfecting the sound and mechanics of the harp through innovative technologies, paving the way for profound advancements for the instrument. While the basic harp structure has not changed in the past several thousand years, "Salvi's artisans and technicians have spent half a century trying to remedy that problem: making the sound stronger, bigger, but still focused; making changes to the pedal mechanism, to the balance of the frame ... At the same time there have been design changes: new, sleeker, sharper-looking models with less decoration, and a lot less gilding." His approach to harp making has ushered in harp innovations including "... nylon bearings, stainless steel action, and polyurethane finish: and novel engineering has produced a method to strengthen the comparatively delicate neck, which had a tendency to warp and/or break." This is what makes the "neck" a unique feature of Salvi harps, "... costing about four times that of a conventional neck to manufacture. Each neck has inner core of many laminations impregnated with resins and compressed to size by a two-story-high press ...." Salvi regularly collaborates with scientists to revolutionize the harp. After many years of research with scientists at University of St. Andrews in Scotland, he developed the electronic harp, which first showcased at the Third World Harp Congress in Vienna, Austria, in 1987. For the past decade and a half, Salvi has been very involved in conducting studies with sounds and sounding boards. His most recent harp innovations further improved the instrument's sound, using MSC Nastran and SimXpert technologies. "Salvi uses numerical simulations and experimental data for their evaluation and calibration designs. Due to the large internal loads seen within the harp, simulations have led to increased structural integrity of the design while correlating to experimental data."

== Philanthropy ==
Salvi has dedicated himself to the promotion of the harp, and its recognition as a solo instrument. He has sponsored several harp competitions, first in Italy and then internationally, throughout his career. He promoted young harpists with recordings by Egan Records and sponsored concerts. In 2005, he built a concert hall on the top floor of the Lyon & Healy factory.

Salvi has commissioned much work for the harp, and has promoted harp music with publishing, as well as commissioning a Sonata for the harp, violin and violincello by Valeri Kikta, called "Venetian Trio", published by Salvi publications. In 2006, he created a harp for Charles, Prince of Wales. The instrument has since been played by the official royal harpist at many imperial functions, including the wedding of Prince William and Catherine Middleton in 2011.

He has collected antique harps from around the world, which he assembled into one of the most important collections in the world. In a 2006 Economist article, Salvi said, "I never thought about having a collection. I bought harps because they were so beautiful."

== Personal life ==
Salvi lived in Chateauneuf-Grasse, France, from 1987 to 2012, during which time he traveled extensively. He lived in Italy in his final years and died in 2015.

== Awards ==
- First prize at the Mostra del Artigianato, held in Florence in 1970.
- The World Harp Congress’s Award of Recognition for Service to the International Harp Community (1996), the Premio Flamalgal from the city of San Remo (1997), and Honorary Citizenship of the City of Viggiano (1999).
- Honorary member of the Royal College of Music, London 2004
- Cavaliere deel'Ordine al Merito della Repubblica Italiana, Italy 2014.
