= Vincent Bach Corporation =

American brass instrument manufacturer

Vincent Bach Corp.
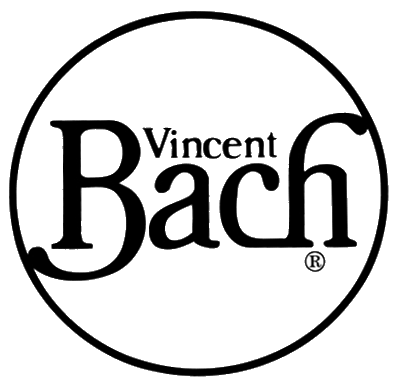
- Company type: Subsidiary
- Industry: Musical instruments
- Founded: 1918; 108 years ago in New York City, US
- Founder: Vincent Bach
- Headquarters: Elkhart, Indiana, U.S.
- Area served: Worldwide
- Key people: Scott M. Gervais (general manager)
- Products: Trumpets; trombones
- Brands: Stradivarius; Bach; Prelude
- Number of employees: 175
- Parent: Conn-Selmer
- Website: bachbrass.com

The Vincent Bach Corporation is an American brass instrument manufacturer based in Elkhart, Indiana, as a subsidiary of Conn-Selmer. The company was founded in 1918 by Austrian-born trumpeter Vincent Bach.

== Vincent Bach ==
Vincent Schrottenbach was born in Baden near Vienna in 1890. As a child he received training on violin, trumpet and bugle. By age 12 he had concentrated on the trumpet. After he graduated from Maschinenbauschule (Mechanical Engineering School, Ansbach) with an engineering degree, he entered into compulsory military service in the Imperial Navy, worked as an elevator operator, and then was re-conscripted during which time he served as a military musician in the Austrian Marine Band.

When he left the military the second time, Vincent decided to defy his family's wishes and pursued a career as a solo cornetist touring Europe. At the outbreak of World War I, he was in England and was forced to flee to the United States in order to escape detention as an enemy alien. He resumed his career as a performer, interrupted by another term of compulsory military service, this time in the US military as a musician.

While Bach was on tour in Pittsburgh in 1918, a repairman destroyed his mouthpiece, and Bach began experimenting with mouthpiece repair and fabrication.

== Vincent Bach Corporation ==
=== New York Period ===
Beginnings

- Time frame: 1916 - 1928
- Products: Mouthpieces
- Brand names: Vincent Bach
- Location:
- Serial Numbers: N/A

The Vincent Bach Corporation began when Vincent purchased a $300 foot-operated lathe and began producing mouthpieces in the back of the Selmer music store in New York. He established his shop across the street from the musicians' union. He ran an advertisement that read "How to become a wizard on cornet without practicing" and accumulated $500 in orders in a short time and began his career as a manufacturer. This period came to an end when Bach was drafted into the US military where he served as bandmaster and bugle instructor during WWI.

Start-up

- Time frame: 1918 - 1919
- Products: Mouthpieces
- Brand names: Vincent Bach
- Location: 11 East 14th Street, Selmer Music, New York, New York
- Serial Numbers: N/A

Start-up continued

- Time frame: 1919 - 1922
- Products: Mouthpieces
- Brand names: Vincent Bach
- Location: 204 East 85th street, New York, New York
- Serial Numbers: N/A

Bach resumed his mouthpiece business and started selling how-to guides and music.

Incorporated

- Time frame: 1922 - 1928
- Products: Mouthpieces, Cornets, Trumpets
- Brand names: Stradivarius, Apollo, Mercury
- Location: 237 E. 41st Street, New York, New York
- Serial Numbers: 2-900 (approximate)

By 1922 the company incorporated, had 10 employees and moved into a small factory at 237 E. 41st Street in New York. In 1924 Bach began producing cornets and trumpets under the Stradivarius by Vincent Bach Corporation name. In 1928, tenor and bass trombones were added to the product line as the company expanded and relocated.

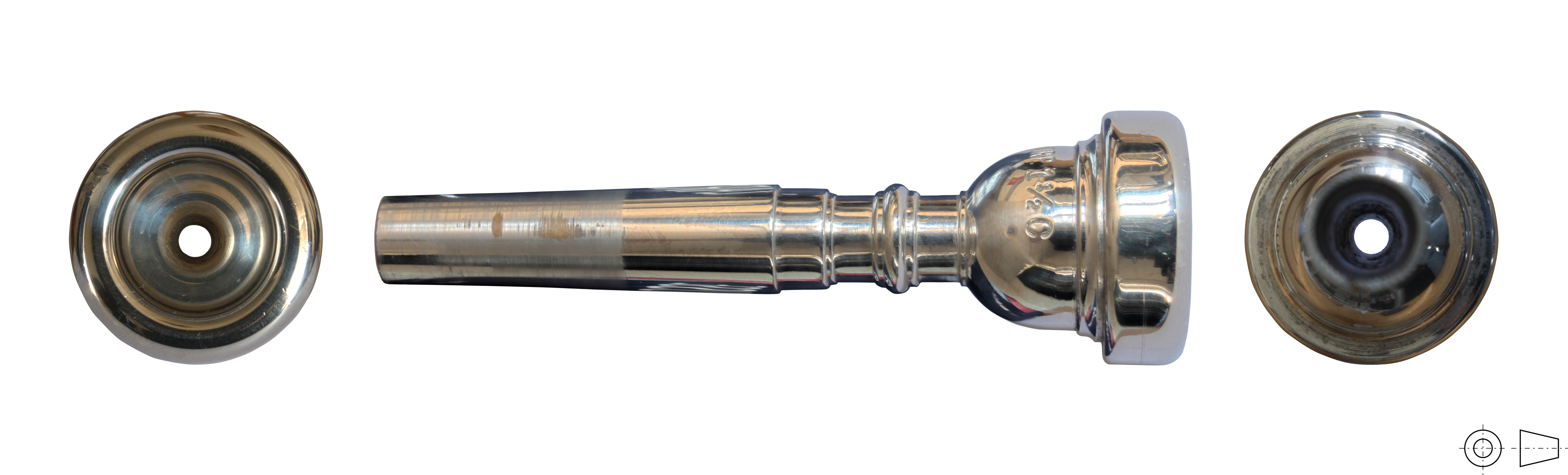
Vincent Bach trumpet mouthpiece

Bronx

- Time frame: 1928–1945
- Products: Mouthpieces, Cornets, Trumpets, Flugelhorns, Trombones
- Brand names: Stradivarius, Apollo, Mercury, Mercedes
- Location: 621 East 216th Street, Bronx, New York
- Serial numbers: 1000 – 6000/6500 (approximate)

In October 1928 the company opened a factory in The Bronx to produce cornets, trumpets and trombones (both tenor and bass). Shortly after this move, Bach removed the “Faciebat Anno” marking from his bell engraving that had been in use since before the 100th horn, and began stamping the bells with “Model” followed by numbers for the bell mandrel and bore size. Some horns have "New York 67" as the location on the bell and are sometimes mistaken for a "67" bell model, however 67 was the pre-zipcode postal code for the Bronx. This practice continued through most of this period. The bell mandrel number had previously appeared in Bach's script “Vincent Bach Corporation” that has been an enduring marking on Bach horns.

In 1933, Bach settled on the "type-E" valve, actually according to Roy Hempley the "New type-E" appears on the first such shop cards, occasionally combining type-E with type-C or others for reasons Bach may only have known. To accommodate this, the tight "2-over, 2-under" wrap gained in height, departing further from Besson designs than the previous horns had.

The company experienced stresses, but survived the depression and expanded again afterward.

Post-war

- Time frame: 1945–ca. 31 July 1953
- Products: Mouthpieces, Cornets, Trumpets, Flugelhorns, Trombones
- Brand names: Stradivarius, Apollo, Mercury, Mercedes
- Location: 621 East 216th Street, Bronx, New York
- Serial numbers: 6000/6500 - 12,600 (approximate)

During the Second World War, Bach coped with a shortage of workers and materials and, while not converted to produce war materials as many competitors were, the company cut back on production. Throughout the early years, Bach resorted to mixing parts and modifying earlier horns returned to their ownership during this period to provide requested instruments to customers. Some horns built from extra parts or reconfigured bear an X on the serial number on the second valve casing, others had a digit added to the original serial number. In some cases, the same serial number exists on another horn. After WWII, Bach was similarly creative in the first years with manpower and material shortages.

The wrap height increased slightly during these years, and the tuning slide while still a "D" shape, became correspondingly flatter.

=== Mount Vernon Period ===
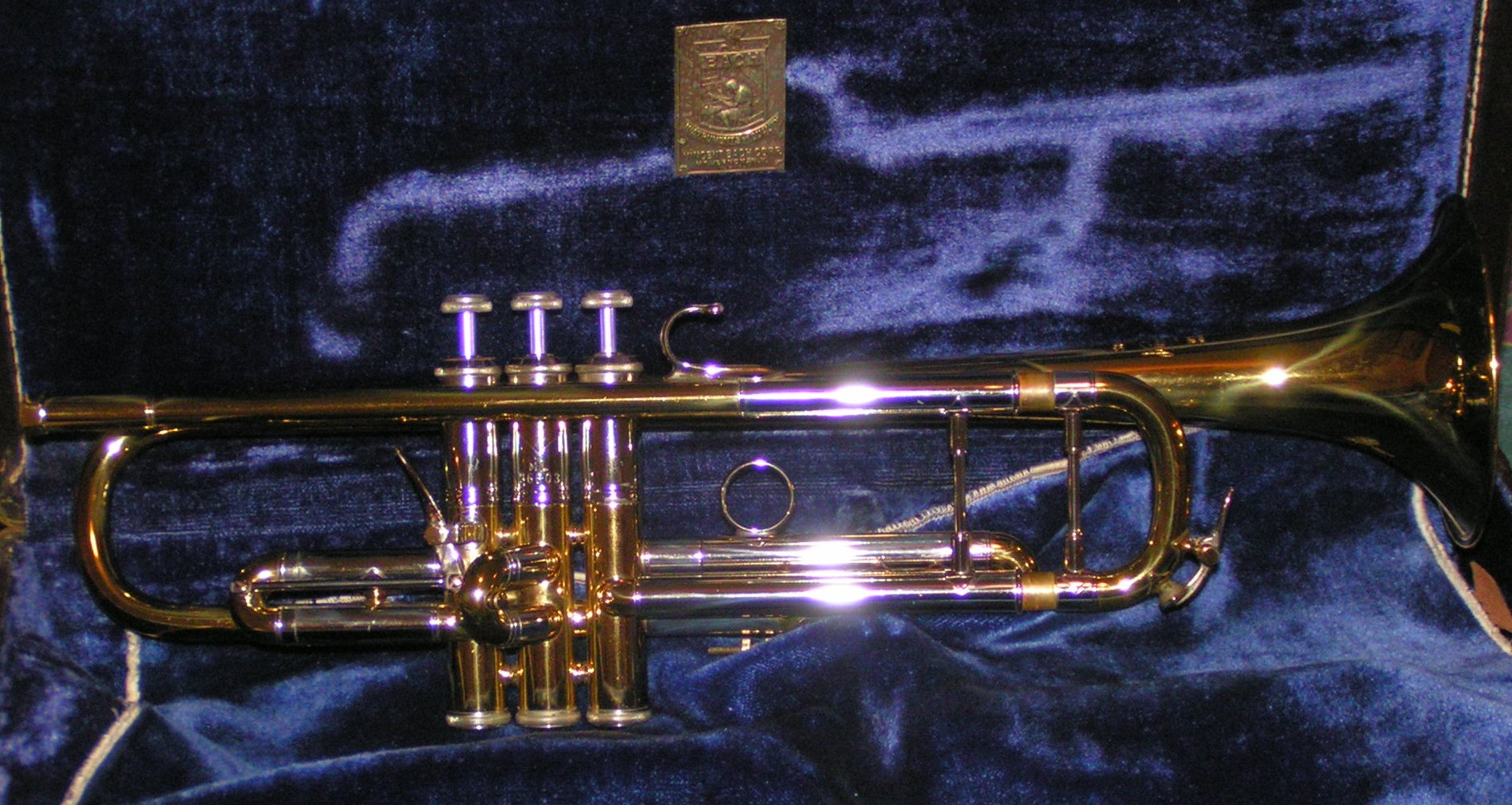
Vincent Bach Mount Vernon manufactured trumpet (#26XXX) in an Elkhart case circa late 60s

Early Mt. Vernon

- Time frame: ca. 1 August 1953–1956
- Products: Mouthpieces, Brass Instruments
- Brand names: Stradivarius, Mercury, Minerva, Mercedes
- Location: 50 South MacQuesten Parkway, Mount Vernon, New York
- Serial Numbers: 12,600 – 16,000 (approximate)

Over the years, the company produced several ranges of trumpets, cornets, flugelhorns and trombones, using the brand names Apollo, Minerva, Mercury, Mercedes and Stradivarius. The Vincent Bach Corporation moved in 1953 from New York City to Mount Vernon, New York. Mt. Vernon Bach horns are prized for being hand-assembled instruments. Mt. Vernon horns can be identified by the Bach manufacturing stamp listing Mount Vernon NY on the second valve casing along with the bore letter code and serial number.

At first, the instruments built at the new factory were identical to the bulk of what had been produced the few years before These were typified by the same wrap height and .020" bell stock Bach had been using primarily after the war.

Mt. Vernon

- Time frame: 1956–1963
- Products: Mouthpieces, Brass Instruments
- Brand names: Stradivarius, Mercury, Minerva, Mercedes
- Location: 50 South MacQuesten Parkway, Mount Vernon, New York
- Serial Numbers: 16,000 – 25,000 (approximate)

It is instruments and mouthpieces from this Bach era that are still aggressively sought after by many who believe that none-other are of this quality. However, several Bach periods each have their fans and the Mt. Vernon mystique is in part due to the early advocacy of these in particular. The design of the trumpet changed at this point in time to include the full wrap height still built today, to feature a flat-faced tuning slide, and to one which required the tuning slide be pulled an inch rather than the customary 1/2 inch to be in tune. This last, by some workings of the physics, is said to "loosen the centering" and "open the blow" (make it take less energy to match pitch with others and make the horn respond).

Selmer at Mt. Vernon

- Time frame: 1963–1964
- Products: Mouthpieces, Brass Instruments
- Brand names: Stradivarius
- Location: 50 South MacQuesten Parkway, Mount Vernon, New York
- Serial Numbers: 25,000 – 29,999

In 1961 Vincent Bach was 71 and the company was acquired that year by The Selmer Company, becoming a "wholly owned subsidiary" on 25 September. Bach stayed on as a consultant and continued to work until at least 1974. Bach accepted the bid from Selmer even though some others of the 13 which he received were higher. Selmer asked Bach, as the first task in his new (lifetime) position as technical consultant, to redesign his trumpet so as to eliminate the unique one inch pull required to be in tune, in favor of a standard 1/2 inch pull. This design was dubbed the model 180.

=== Elkhart Period ===
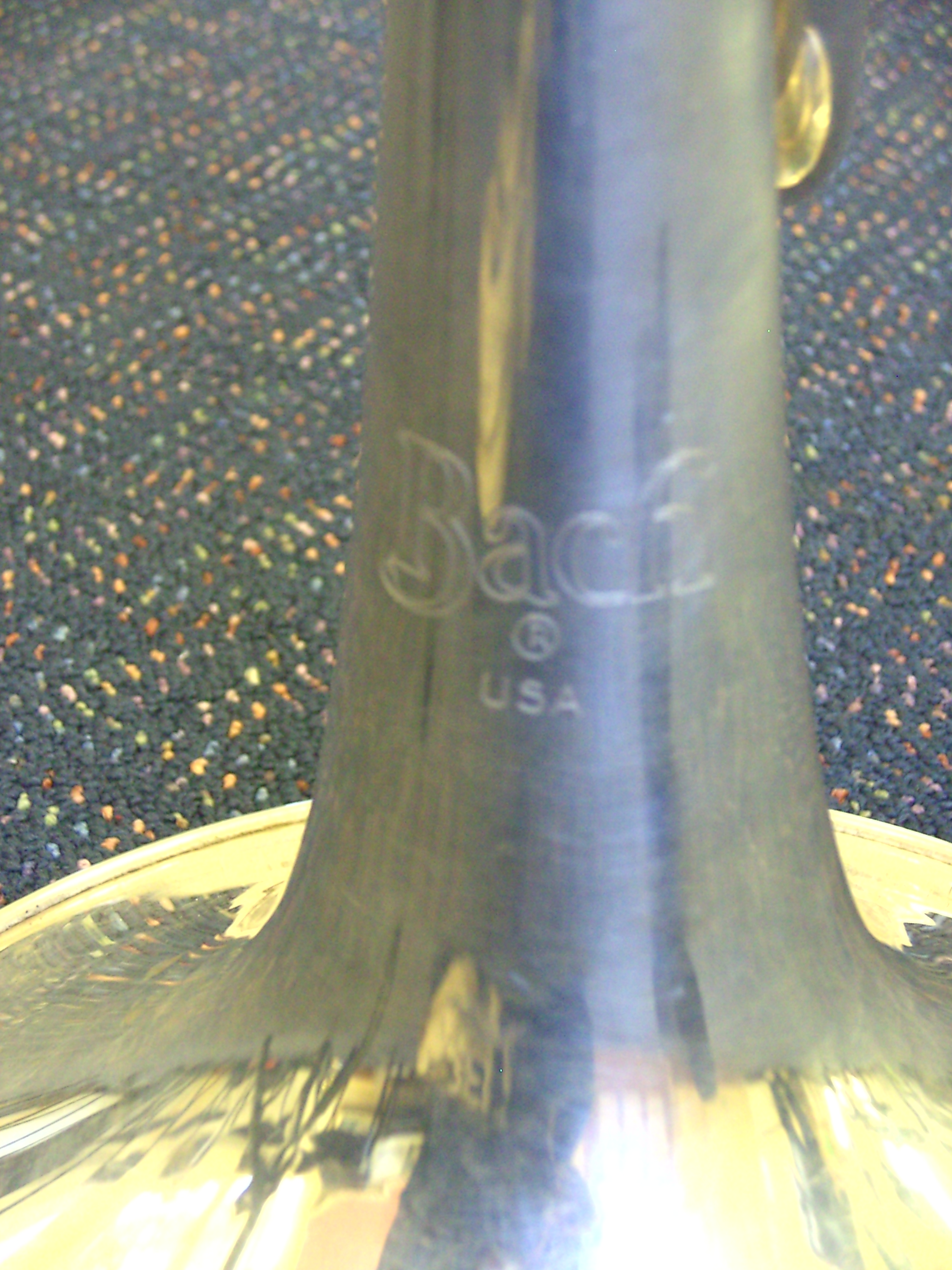
Bach logo on a 30,000-series Mellophonium.

Early Elkhart

- Time frame: 1965 – ca. 1974
- Products: Mouthpieces, Brass Instruments
- Brand names: Stradivarius, Bundy(Selmer name no longer used)
- Location: Main Street, Elkhart, Indiana
- Serial Numbers: 30,000 - around 100–110,000

It is believed that Vincent Bach continued customizing a small number of horns at the old Mt. Vernon facility for special customers.

The bulk of tooling, along with many parts and assembled horns, were relocated to a former Buescher plant on Main Street in Elkhart Indiana where production started in January 1965.

Horns of this period featured an increase in the thickness of bell-making stock to 0.025" from the 0.020" New York standard that was reclassified in Elkhart as lightweight, and denoted by a star on the bell. The wire inside the rim bead changed to being steel and can be detected using a magnet.

Selmer's "Signet" line of trumpets, cornets, and trombones debuted in 1968, and was advertised as "designed by Vincent Bach." Likewise, the "Mercedes" and "Mercedes II" models of 1969.

Elkhart

- Time frame: ca. 1974 - 2010
- Products: Mouthpieces, Brass Instruments
- Brand names: Stradivarius, Bundy(brand retired mid-80s), Bach, Prelude (imported stencil product introduced after 2000)
- Location: 600 Industrial Parkway, Elkhart, Indiana
- Serial Numbers: around 110,000 - around 525,000

Less than a decade after starting-up the Main Street plant, production moved again to a Conn factory belonging to the Selmer Company on Industrial Drive in Elkhart, alongside of which the Conn-Selmer corporate offices are located presently. The Bach line of brass instruments continues to be made in Elkhart, Indiana, using the same blueprints and the same techniques as the originals. They are sold as a premium brand under the name “Bach Stradivarius” as well as the student line “Bach” horns, manufactured in Eastlake Ohio.

Design changes that followed included transitioning from the 2-piece valve casings Bach had always used to a more cost-effective, but lighter, single tube casing. At some point the rim wire was also changed back to brass.

Sales of Bach instruments remained strong, as did market reputation through the 1970s and 1980s, but in the 1990s both the size of the workforce and the warranty costs began to increase dramatically. Sales decreased at the same time. A strike in 2006 (see below) then led to significant changes in staffing and work rules, many of which had been transplants from automotive repetitive manufacturing that were applied to the job-shop format of an instrument maker.

Modern

- Time frame: ca. 2010–Present
- Products: Mouthpieces, Brass Instruments
- Brand names: Stradivarius, Bach, Prelude (imported stencil product), Aristocrat (imported stencil product)
- Location: 600 Industrial Parkway, Elkhart, Indiana
- Serial Numbers: 525,000 -

Changes continued at the Bach facility after reorganization. Long time employee Tedd Waggoner took the lead role in the company until his retirement in 2019. Minor changes to design such as a longer receiver and reintroducing the oldest Bach bell taper happened during this period, as did the ramping-up of a new 190 series of "Artisan" trumpets that replicated the 2-piece casings and steel rim wire of Early Elkhart production. New private owners began an aggressive program of upgrading to automated CNC lathes and milling equipment as well as robotic buffers in 2017. The Chicago C trumpet, reintroduced earlier through the joint efforts of Waggoner and retired engineer / Bach historian Roy Hempley (1940–2020) expanded in sales and was augmented by a "Philadelphia" C.

=== Strike ===
On 1 April 2006, workers at the Bach plant in Elkhart began a strike that lasted three years. The main issues were the union's desire to preserve employee compensation and company's goals to increase product quality. Production was interrupted until the company hired replacement workers, and roughly a third of the strikers returned to work. The strike ended when workers voted to dissolve the relationship between the company and the United Auto Workers union.
