= Renold Schilke =

American trumpet player, designer (1910–1982)

Renold Otto Schilke (June 30, 1910 – September 5, 1982) was an American professional orchestral trumpet player, instrument designer and manufacturer. He founded and ran Schilke Music Products Incorporated, a manufacturer of brass instruments and mouthpieces.

== Youth ==
Renold Schilke was born June 30, 1910, in Green Bay, Wisconsin, United States. His father was Otto W. Schilke, a butcher and meat dealer, who was born in Germany about 1870–1871 and died in Green Bay, WI, on October 10, 1932. Renold's grandfather, Ernst Wilhelm Schilke, was born on November 20, 1846, in Niederzehren (now Czarne Dolne), Westpreussen (now Poland). The region of West Prussia, now part of Poland, where the Schilke family originated, is now generally called Pomerania. Renold began playing cornet at the age of eight. Before his teens, he was initiated into the life of a professional musician playing for the Frank Holton Company and also learning basics of instrument manufacture, as had cornet virtuoso and instrument manufacturer Ernst Couturier before him.

== Studies and research ==
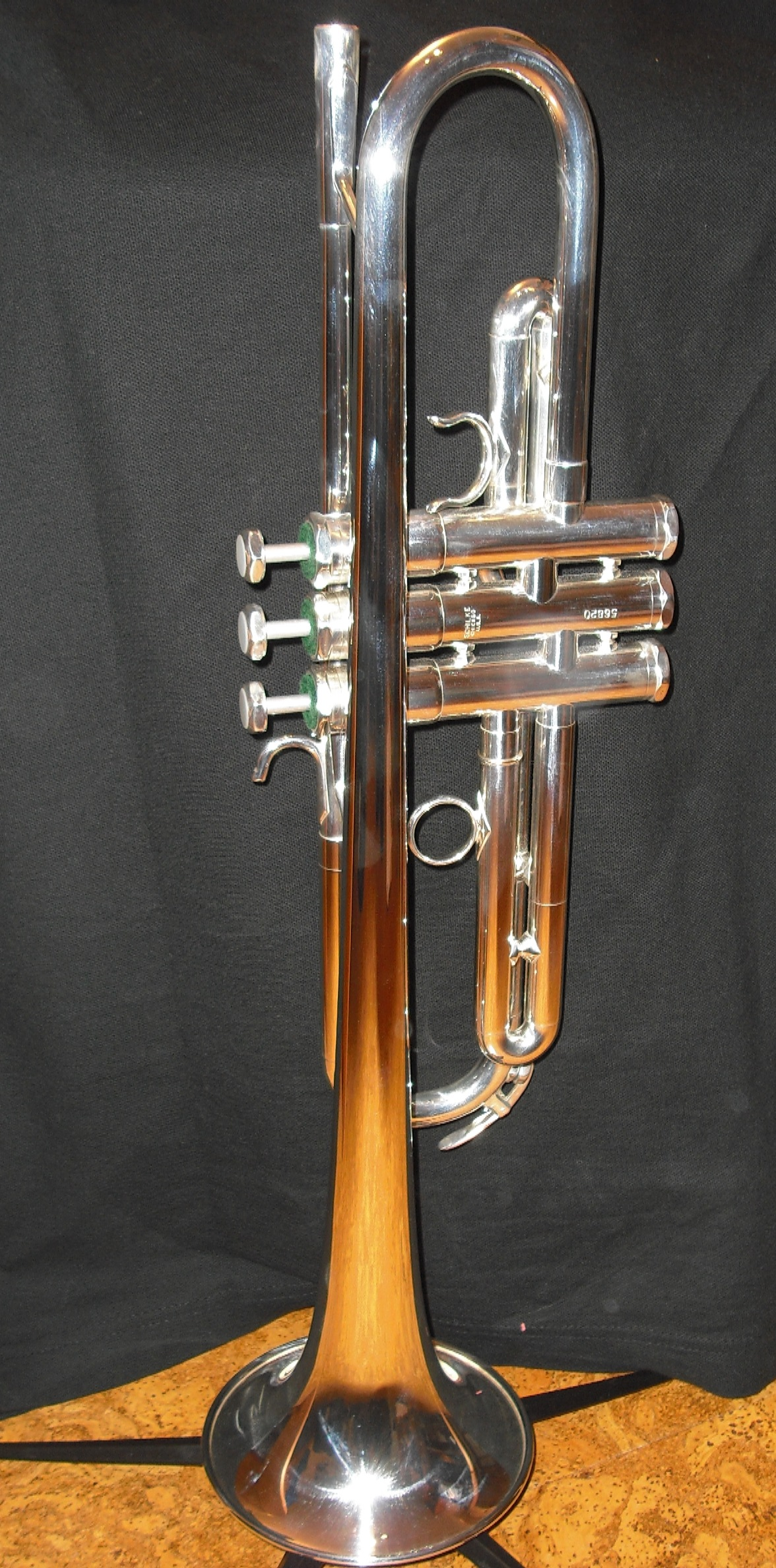
A Schilke model X3 trumpet

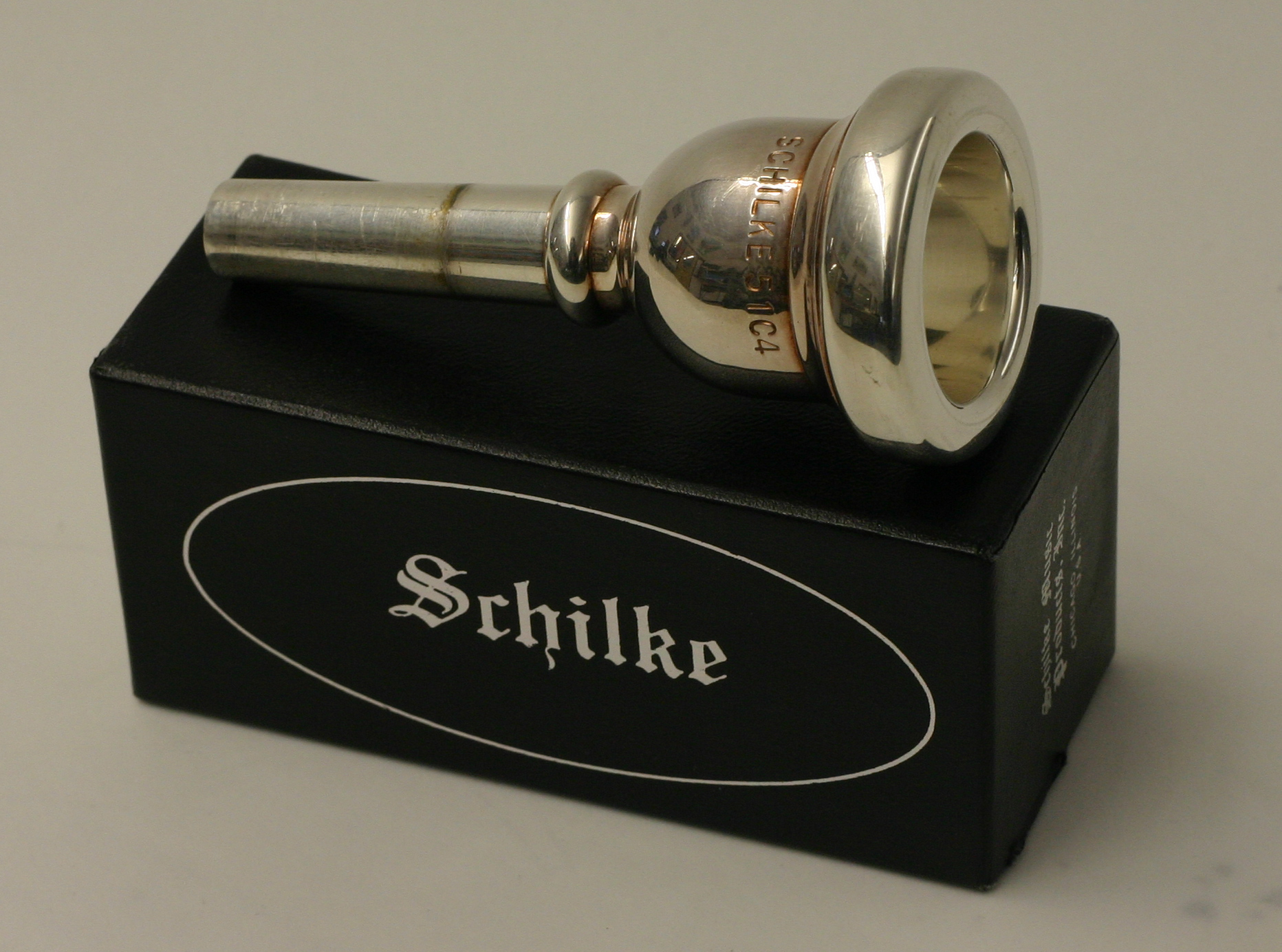
A Schilke trombone mouthpiece

Schilke studied for a year at the Brussels Conservatory in Belgium before graduating from Green Bay's East High School at age 18. The 1930 census lists Renold in his father's household at 1254 Cherry Street, with occupation given as "musician." In the 1931 Green Bay city directory, he is at the same address, with designation "student." Schilke continued his studies at the University of Chicago and Northwestern University while playing professionally. As a result of his childhood activities in the Holton plant as well as additional trade school studies, he was a skilled tool and die craftsman and dabbled in both firearms and brass instrument making. In 1934 Schilke was promoted from transfer membership to full membership in the Chicago local of the AFM, according to The Intermezzo of that year, v. 11, p. 5. Around this time, he was a student of the principal trumpet in the Chicago Symphony Orchestra, Edward Llewellyn.

While in Belgium, Schilke became acquainted with the acoustical ideas of eighteenth century instrument designer and acoustical scientist Victor Mahillon. His theories described nodal points in a resonating tube that would dramatically affect the final pitch produced. Schilke used mathematics and measurements taken with a contact microphone and oscilloscope to identify these key nodes for each pitch in his horns. By making adjustments to the diameter of the tubing, or by eliminating intrusions into the geometric progression at these points, he improved the overall intonation.

Schilke also studied metallurgy and the physics of sound production. He experimented with different alloys, formulating and then testing theories as to the effects of utilizing different alloys in different parts of the horn on intonation and timbre. Schilke took the scientific approach to answering the question of plating versus lacquering or bare brass - finding that the inelastic lacquer masked the ductility of most alloys resulting in the resonation of the metal itself being increased relative to the resonation of the air column whereas plating was indistinguishable from bare brass as it was merely a thin layer of equally ductile material.

Like his neighbor and fellow Chicago Symphony trumpeter Elden Benge, as well as Vincent Bach, and Ernst Couturier, Schilke used his knowledge of machining and the science of sound to address his dissatisfaction with the instruments available to him by building his own.

== Professional career ==
Edward Llewellyn died in 1936; in 1937, Renold Schilke began playing in the Chicago Symphony Orchestra. Following the departure of Elden Benge, he became principal trumpet in 1938. He continued in that role until 1941 and continued with the orchestra until 1951, when he stepped down, remaining available on call as needed until 1962.

Schilke founded a company with Philip Farkas that ultimately grew to become Schilke Music Products Incorporated, which he became sole owner of in 1956. In 1966, Yamaha Corporation hired Schilke as a consultant who, with the help of colleagues such as Elden Benge, Philip Farkas and Arnold Jacobs assisted Yamaha in bringing a new line of brass instruments to the American market.

== Death and legacy ==
Renold O. Schilke died on September 5, 1982, in Arizona of kidney failure while still actively consulting for Yamaha and heading his own company. His son Renold E. Schilke and daughter Joan Schilke assumed ownership of the company and managed it until October 2002 when it was sold to Andrew Naumann, a veteran of the Getzen company.

The company continues to build Schilke designed instruments and mouthpieces for the professional market. Schilke mouthpieces are used by players of brass instruments of every age and ability and are the basis for Yamaha mouthpieces, sharing a numbering scheme for their dimensions and characteristics in common.

Since the company's inception, many of the top names in both commercial and symphonic styles use or have used Schilke trumpets including Bill Chase, Randy Brecker, Marvin Stamm, Adolph Herseth, Arturo Sandoval, Duško Gojković, Jon Faddis, Lew Soloff, Alan Rubin, Rick Baptist, Lin Biviano, Johnny Madrid, Dizzy Gillespie, and members of the Canadian Brass.
