= Philip Farkas =

American horn player

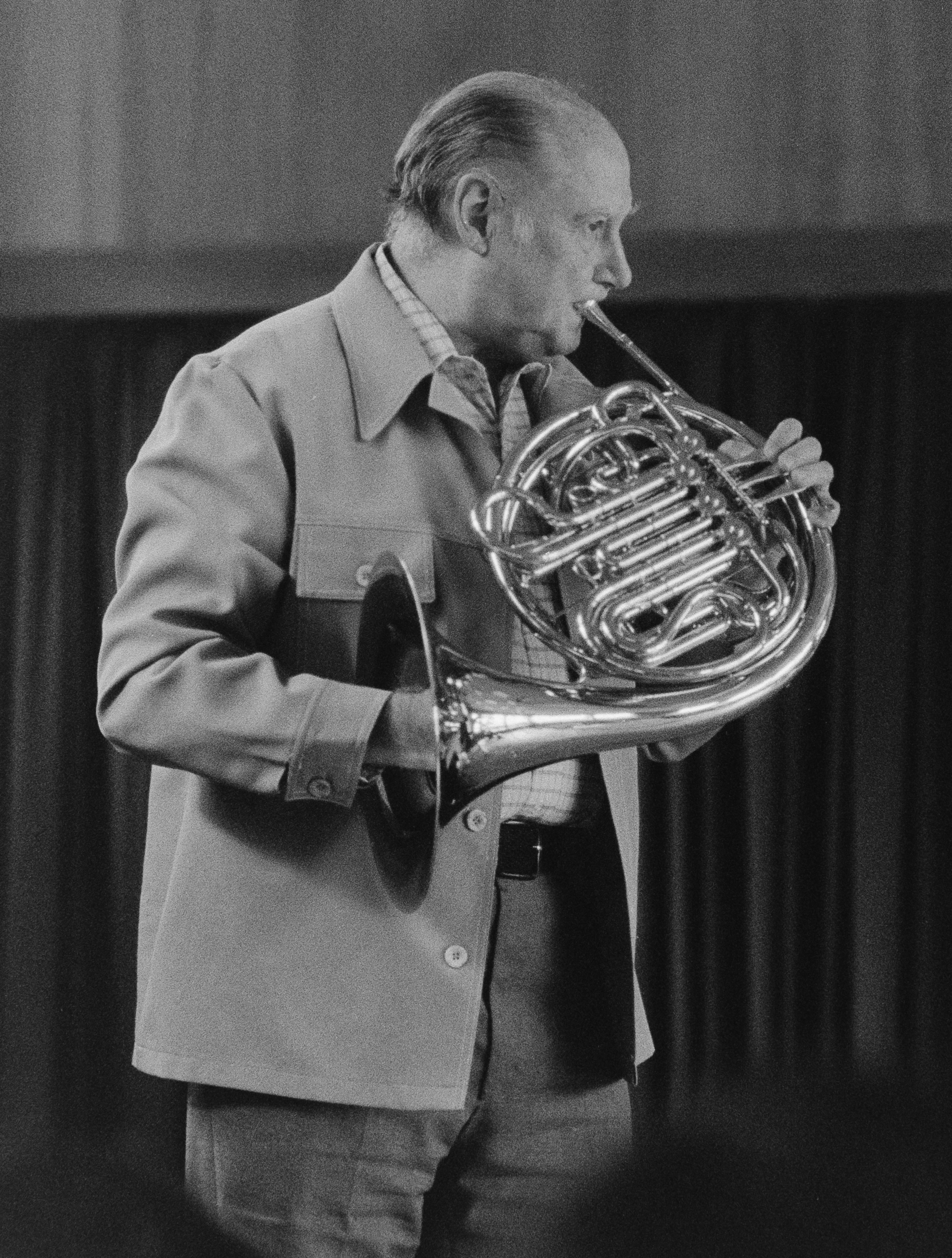
- Philip Farkas at Trossingen, August 1980
- Born: Philip Farkas; March 5, 1914; Chicago, Illinois, U.S.
- Died: December 21, 1992 (aged 78)
- Occupations: Horn player; music educator; author
- Employer: Indiana University School of Music
- Known for: Principal horn, Chicago Symphony Orchestra; The Art of French Horn Playing
- Notable work: The Art of French Horn Playing; The Art of Brass Playing; The Art of Musicianship; A Photo Study of 40 Virtuoso Horn Players' Embouchures
- Awards: Honorary doctorate, Eastern Michigan University (1978)

Philip Farkas (March 5, 1914 – December 21, 1992) was the principal French horn player in the Chicago Symphony Orchestra for many years, leaving in 1960 to join the music faculty at Indiana University School of Music. His books include The Art of French Horn Playing (considered the field's seminal work), The Art of Brass Playing, The Art of Musicianship, and A Photo Study of 40 Virtuoso Horn Players' Embouchures. Nancy Jordan Fako wrote his biography, Philip Farkas and His Horn - A Happy, Worthwhile Life. Later in his life he helped design the Holton-Farkas horn.

== Life ==
Farkas was born on March 5, 1914, in Chicago to Anna Cassidy Farkas and Emil Nelson Farkas. March 5 is called the Horn Duumvirate Date, as it is the birth date of both Farkas and Barry Tuckwell, two great horn players of the 20th century. His parents were not musical, but his mother encouraged him to take piano lessons as his introduction to music. Around the age of twelve his Boy Scout troop needed a bugler, so he volunteered, seeking tutoring from a neighbor who played trumpet.

Around the age of fourteen he began to develop asthma. His parents thought it would be best if he played a wind instrument in band, but the school only had a bass drum and a tuba available, so he chose the tuba. The instrument proved unwieldy on the streetcar to school; after a conductor pointed out a horn case belonging to a passing band, Farkas and his father rented a Schmidt horn for three dollars a month.

After taking up the horn, he pursued it professionally. While still in high school, he became the youngest member of the All-Chicago High School Orchestra, first horn in the Chicago Civic Orchestra, and first horn in the Kansas City Philharmonic.

He held first chair positions in the Chicago Symphony, Boston Symphony Orchestra, and Cleveland Orchestra, and was the youngest principal player in the Chicago Symphony Orchestra. Farkas taught at Indiana University School of Music, Northwestern University, Cleveland Institute of Music, Kansas City Conservatory, DePaul University, and Roosevelt University. His pupils included Douglas Hill and Paul Marcotte.

He founded Wind Music Inc. and partnered with Chicago trumpeter Renold Schilke in founding Schilke Music Products, also serving as a consultant to the musical instrument division of Yamaha Corporation. He received an honorary doctorate in music from Eastern Michigan University in April 1978.

He designed the top-selling Holton-Farkas horn made by the Frank Holton Company and a large selection of mouthpieces. He continued to practice his horn every day until his death on December 21, 1992, at the age of 78.

== Early teachers ==
Farkas began studying horn with Louis Dufrasne in 1930, making weekly trips by public transit from his home on Chicago's south side to Dufrasne's home in Evanston, Illinois. He credited Dufrasne's guidance as the single biggest influence in his career. Dufrasne's studies were later preserved in Tonal Flexibility Studies for French Horn by William Mercier (1948).

It is my desire to create such a book, containing not only the findings of my own years of experience, but that of my teachers, which prompts me to write so complex a subject as horn playing. But, if some day I might hear a solo beautifully played and would hear the soloist say afterward 'Your book helped me do that', I would feel repaid for my effort a hundred times over.

— Philip Farkas, The Art of French Horn Playing

== See also ==
- Embouchure
- Louis Dufrasne
