= Holton-Farkas =

Line of French horns and mouthpieces

Holton-Farkas is a product line of French horns and mouthpieces created through the joint venture of musical instrument manufacturer Frank Holton & Co. and legendary horn virtuoso Philip Farkas. The first model was released in 1958, and although no new models are being made (Farkas died in 1992), the series is still being manufactured today. These professional-grade horns and mouthpieces are regarded as some of the best in the market, and are the most popular for non-professional horn players.

== History ==
The production of the Holton-Farkas was an opportunity for Holton to overhaul its line of French horns with the help of a renowned horn player, Philip Farkas. Farkas and personnel from Holton worked closely together on all aspects of the line. In the business agreement, Farkas agreed to advise, test, and assist in the creation of the horns, and once created, to endorse and market them. In exchange, Holton agreed to furnish these horns for Farkas' personal use and pay him a percentage of the net selling price.

=== Conception ===
The creation of the Holton-Farkas line was a product of chance. In early 1956, Farkas and two executives from Holton, Elliot Kehl and Theodore Kexel, were invited to dinner with Traugott Rohner, who published the magazine The Instrumentalist. Both parties were there for his own reasons: Farkas because he was writing an article, and Kehl and Kexel for discussions on advertising. The idea for a partnership came about over dinner conversation. Farkas recollects:

As we sat around talking, one of them said to me, "You're a horn player, what do you think of the Holton horn?" I replied, undiplomatically, "I think it's one of the worst horns I've ever played." Instead of getting mad, they looked at each other and grinned. "Well," one of them said, "I guess that's the reason why we only sold eight last year." They then asked me to design a horn for them.

Despite the chance nature of this meeting, Farkas had already considered the idea of creating a horn earlier in his life. This being so, he promptly agreed to Holton's proposal.

=== 1956–58 ===
The foundational work on the Holton-Farkas line took place from 1956 until the first model (77) was released in 1958. The Holton-Farkas line was given much attention during this phase by both Farkas and Holton. Farkas, Arvid Walters (Holton's lead designer), and Elliot Kehl met several times a week to collaborate. Also, Holton produced entirely new tooling in order to consistently produce the quality of horn that Holton and Farkas sought after. The leaders of this project quickly formed a smooth working relationship. Of the work environment in this early stage, Nancy Fako, the author of a biography on Farkas and one of his former students, said,

Phil impressed everyone with his constant attention to the smallest details and his unflagging search for perfection. Elliot Kehl was the perfect person with whom to collaborate, as he also demanded perfection in all that he undertook. For this reason many people found him difficult to work with, but he and Phil formed a solid, efficient team.

Renold Schilke, another prominent musician and entrepreneur, also aided in the work on the new Holton-Farkas horns in August 1956.

=== Post-1958 ===
Changes in personnel and the project itself took place after the release of the first model.

Farkas' physical presence at the Holton factory was largely replaced by correspondence through letter and phone. His job now was to promote the horns he helped create, though he frequently offered his help and advice. He was rarely seen without one of these horns and actively endorsed them.

In 1964, Frank Holton & Co. was bought by G. Leblanc Corp., a woodwind manufacturer, and in 2004, the two companies were bought by Steinway Musical Instruments, Conn-Selmer division. Despite some changes in management and staffing, Farkas' advice was still much sought after, and he continued to play and market the horns until his death in 1992.

== Models ==
Together, Holton and Farkas produced 18 different models of horns and 6 different mouthpieces. Many models are almost identical, with one or two key differences.

=== French horns ===
Features common to the Holton-Farkas horn include a waterkey, .468" bore, .310 venturi mouthpipe, and 12 1/4" tapered bell. A table of the different models and their features follows.

Model	Year	Type of horn	Currently in production	Plating	Throat	Wrap	Bell
Model 77	1958	Double	No	Yellow Brass	Medium	Kruspe-style	Fixed
H-177	1964	Double	Yes	Nickel Silver	Medium	Kruspe-style	Fixed
H-178	1964	Double	Yes	Yellow Brass	Medium	Kruspe-style	Fixed
H-179	1964	Double	Yes	Nickel Silver	Large	Kruspe-style	Fixed
H-180	1964	Double	Yes	Yellow Brass	Large	Kruspe-style	Fixed
H-181	Unknown	Double	Yes	Yellow Brass/Bronze bell	Large	Kruspe-style	Fixed
H-190	1964-1989?	Double	No	Yellow Brass	Small	Geyer-style	Fixed
H-191	Unknown	Double	No	Yellow Brass	Small	Geyer-style	Fixed
H-175 "Merker Matic"	Unknown	Double	Yes	Nickel Silver	Large	Kruspe-style	Fixed
H-176 "Merker Matic"	Unknown	Double	Yes	Nickel Silver/Bronze bell	Large	Kruspe-style	Fixed
H-189 "Merker Matic"	Unknown	Double	Yes	Nickel Silver	Extra Large	Kruspe-style	Fixed
H-275 "Merker Matic"	Unknown	Double	Yes	Nickel Silver	Large	Kruspe-style	Detachable
H-276 "Merker Matic"	Unknown	Double	Yes	Nickel Silver/Bronze bell	Large	Kruspe-style	Detachable
H-289 "Merker Matic"	Unknown	Double	Yes	Nickel Silver	Extra Large	Kruspe-style	Detachable
H-104 "Tuckwell"	1990	Double	No	Red Brass/Bronze bell	Large	Kruspe-style	Detachable (Bayonet fitting)
H-105 "Tuckwell"	Unknown	Double	No	Nickel Silver/Bronze bell	Large	Kruspe-stye	Detachable
H-109 "Ultra Farkas"	1991	Double	No	Nickel Silver	Large	Kruspe-style	Fixed
H-209 "Ultra Farkas"	1991	Double	No	Nickel Silver	Large	Kruspe-style	Detachable
H-200	Unknown	Descant	Yes	Yellow Brass	Large	Geyer-style	Detachable
H-378	Unknown	Intermediate Double	Yes	Yellow Brass	Medium	Kruspe-style	Fixed
H-379	Unknown	Intermediate Double	Yes	Nickel Silver	Medium	Kruspe-style	Fixed
H-277	1964	Double	Yes	Nickel Silver	Medium	Kruspe-style	Detachable
H-278	1964	Double	Yes	Yellow Brass	Medium	Kruspe-style	Detachable
H-279	1964	Double	Yes	Nickel Silver	Large	Kruspe-style	Detachable
H-280	1964	Double	Yes	Yellow Brass	Large	Kruspe-style	Detachable
H-281	Unknown	Double	Yes	Yellow Brass/Bronze bell	Large	Kruspe-style	Detachable

=== French horn mouthpieces ===
A table of the different Farkas H2850 French Horn mouthpiece models and their features follows.

Model	Cup Depth	Rim Shape	Inside Cup Diameter (mm)	Outside Cup Diameter (mm)	Throat (mm)
SC	Shallow	Medium Wide	16.87	24.80	4.32
MC	Medium	Medium Wide	16.81	25.20	4.62
MDC	Medium Deep	Medium Wide	16.21	24.33	4.62
DC	Deep	Medium	17.07	24.64	4.83
VDC	Very Deep	Narrow	16.71	23.16	5.23
XDC	Extra Deep	Medium Narrow	16.94	24.20	5.23
