= Salvi Harps =

N.S.M. S.p.A.
- Trade name: Salvi Harps
- Type: privately-held stock corporation
- Industry: musical instruments manufacturing
- Founded: 1956; 70 years ago
- Founder: Victor Salvi
- Headquarters: Via Rossana, 7 12026, Piasco (province of Cuneo), Piedmont, Italy
- Key people: Marco Salvi (President)
- Products: harps
- Number of employees: 90
- Subsidiaries: Lyon & Healy, Bow Brand
- Website: www.salviharps.com

Salvi Harps is an Italian manufacturer of concert harps. The company was founded by Italian-American harpist and harpmaker Victor Salvi in 1956.

== History ==
The father of company founder Victor (Vittorio) Salvi was an Italian luthier, piano and harp maker from Venice who worked in Viggiano, a town in Southern Italy known for its musical instruments before emigrating to the United States together with his wife in 1913. Victor Salvi was born in Chicago in 1920. Like his siblings Alberto and Aida, he learned to play the harp and became harpist of the United States Navy Band during World War II and later with the New York Philharmonic and with the NBC Symphony Orchestra.

During his career as a harpist, he started – first spurred by a shortage of parts during the war – to continue his family tradition in instrument making, repaired harps in Chicago and built his first harp in New York City in 1954.

In 1956, Salvi founded a harp making business in Genoa under the name of "N.S.M.", which stands for "nuovi strumenti musicali" (new musical instruments). In 1974, the workshop was moved to Piasco, a village close to the town of Saluzzo in Piedmont, which has a long tradition in woodworking. For the strings, Salvi acquired British string maker Bow Brand, while the mechanics were manufactured in Switzerland.

In 1987, Salvi Harps acquired the insolvent U.S. harp manufacturing company Lyon & Healy of Chicago, which had been founded in 1889 and which is the only other large manufacturer of concert harps.

== Present situation ==
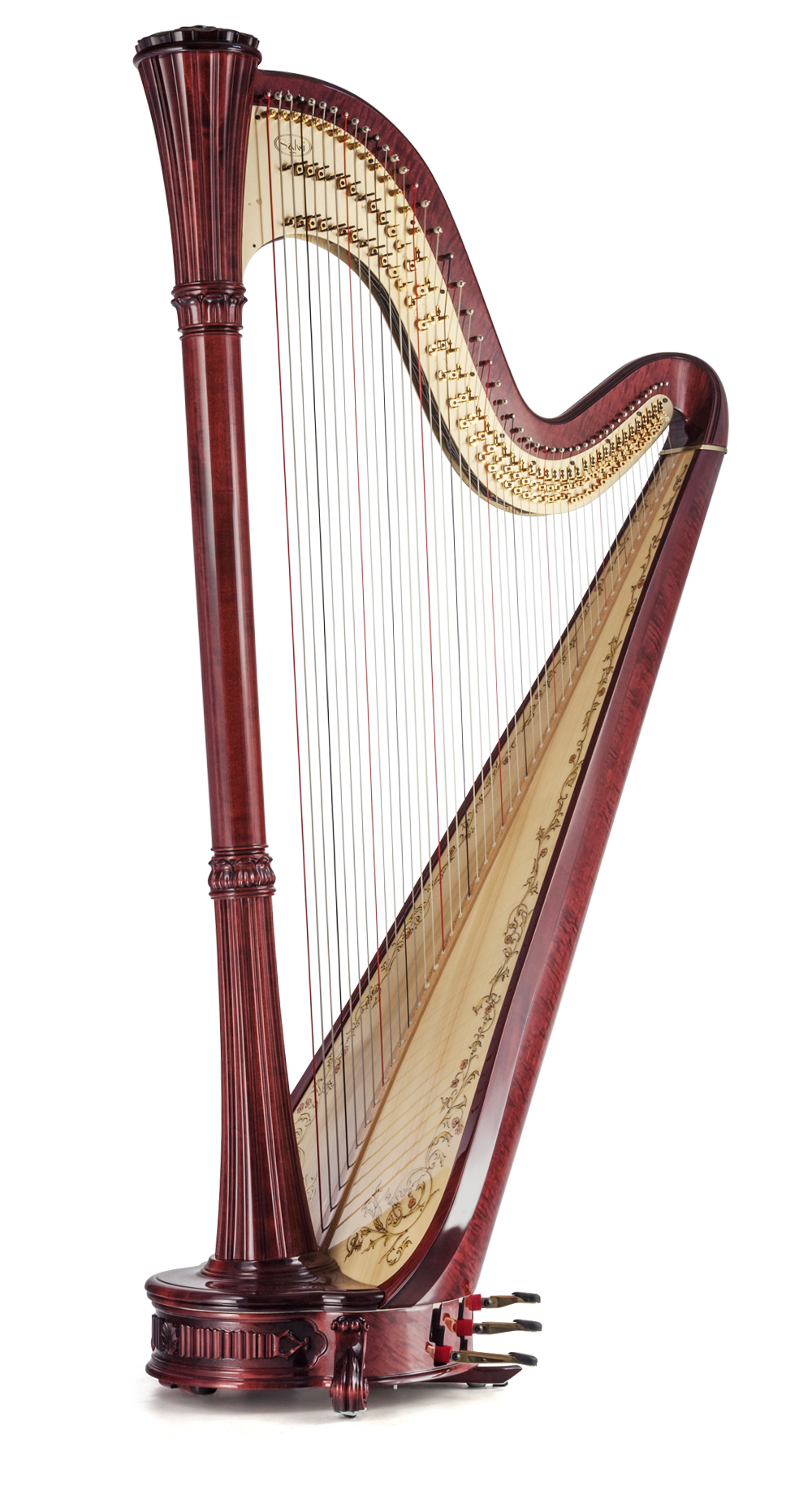
A Salvi double-action concert harp.

Salvi is one of the most important manufacturers of high-quality harps. About 90 employees make about 2,000 harps a year from spruce and maple wood, about half of which are concert (double action) harps, and the remaining lever and electroacoustic harps.

The subsidiary Lyon & Healy employs about 135 staff in Chicago.

== Museum ==
The company-owned museum Museo dell'Arpa Victor Salvi in Piasco was opened in 2006 and houses a significant collection of historic harps.

== Foundation ==
The Fondazione Victor Salvi was founded in 2000 and supports harp playing worldwide. It organizes competitions, offers scholarships, commissions new works for the harp and lends instruments.
