= Edward Llewellyn (trumpeter) =

American musician and composer (1879–1936)

Edward Beach Llewellyn (January 11, 1879, in St. Louis, Missouri – September 25, 1936, in Monahans, Texas) was an American trumpeter, cornetist, and composer.

== Early life ==
Llewellyn was the son of a trumpeter, cornetist, and composer. In 1890, Edward began to study the cornet with his father. He also studied piano, violin, and harmony at Chicago Music College. In 1893, father and son played in the orchestra of the Chicago World's Columbian Exposition.

== Career ==
Llewellyn played in the Chicago Marine Band from 1895 to 1899, later becoming solo trumpet in the band from 1900 to 1904. He played, again with his father, at the Pan-American Exposition in 1901.

After the turn of the century, Llewellyn played cornet and trumpet with Brooke's Band on Catalina Island. On August 26, 1903, Llewellyn caught a record sea bass at Santa Catalina Island. It weighed 425 pounds.

Llewellyn was also a gifted sportsman, wrestler and golfer. In 1907 and 1908 he was the U.S. national champion cyclist. Llewelyn was the principal trumpet player with the Chicago Symphony for 22 years. At the time of his accidental death in Texas, he was personnel manager of the Chicago Symphony.

== Career ==
Edward Llewellyn was the son of English-born trumpeter James D. Llewellyn (1856–1920), who emigrated to the United States in 1869. James had been a featured cornet soloist at the 1893 World's Fair.

- 1895-1899: Trumpet and Cornet with the Brookes Chicago Marine Band
- 1900-1904: Trumpet soloist with the Brookes Chicago Marine Band
- 1905–1906: Cornet soloist with the United States Marine Band
- 1907–1908: Principal trumpet of the Pittsburg Symphony
- 1908–1912: Principal trumpet with the Rochester Municipal Band (Minnesota)
- 1909–1911: Principal trumpet of the Chicago Opera
- 1911–1933: Principal trumpet of the Chicago Symphony
- 1916–1923: Principal trumpet of the Ravinia Park Opera Company
- 1933–1936: Personnel manager of the Chicago Symphony

== Soloist appearances ==
- 1907: Soloist with the British Guards Band at the Manhattan Beach Hotel at Coney Island

== Affiliated engagements ==
Llewellyn was affiliated with the Frank Holton Company and worked part-time as a salesman for the Chicago branch of the company, where it is said he sold a remarkable number of instruments for the amount of time that he spent doing so.

== Selected compositions ==
He composed many solos including "My Regards," which he wrote for his own use while with the Chicago Symphony.

== Students ==
Among Llewellyn's many students were Clifford P. Lillya, late professor of cornet and trumpet at the University of Michigan, and Llewellyn's successor in the Chicago Symphony, trumpet manufacturer Renold Schilke. After Llewellyn's death, Schilke copied the Mouthpiece Edward used and is part of the Schilke Mouthpiece catalog as the model 9

== Athletic activities ==
Edward Llewellyn was also a noted cyclist, winning national championships in 1907 and 1908. He was also a wrestler, boxer, and passionate golfer.

- August 1897: Winner of the 1/3 mile, League of American Wheelmen Annual Amateur Championship, Philadelphia
- July 30, 1898: Amateur Record, 1 mile

He also was an avid fisherman. In 1903 he caught what was then the world record Sea Bass which weighed in at 425. Picture.

== Death ==
Llewellyn was killed in a car accident in Monahans, Texas, in 1936 when a pipe fell off a truck he was following and crashed through the windshield.
