= Holton (Leblanc) =

Frank Holton and Company
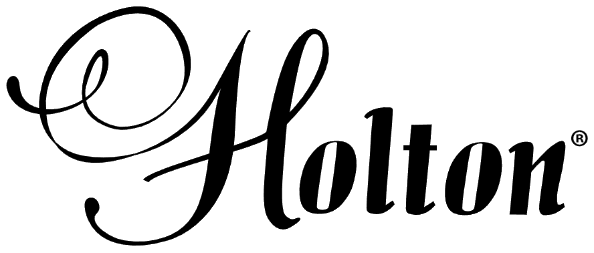
- Company type: Private (1898–1964); Subsidiary (1964–2004); Brand (2004–present)
- Industry: Musical instruments
- Founded: 1898
- Founder: Frank E. Holton
- Fate: Company acquired by Leblanc officially in 1964 although Leblanc did start to manufacturer some (Holton by Leblanc) branded band instruments starting in 1951, then became a brand
- Headquarters: Elkhart, Indiana, United States
- Number of locations: 1
- Area served: Worldwide
- Products: Trumpets, cornets, French horns, trombones
- Owner: Conn-Selmer

Holton is a brand owned by the Conn-Selmer division of Steinway Musical Instruments. The original business was a used instrument shop began in 1898 by American trombone player Frank Holton in Chicago, Illinois. The firm built brass instruments for ten years in Chicago, then in Elkhorn, Wisconsin from 1918 until 2008, when production of Holton-branded instruments moved to Eastlake, Ohio. The business remained independent until it was acquired by Leblanc in 1964. Leblanc was acquired by Conn-Selmer in 2004 and its properties became subsidiaries of Conn-Selmer.

== Frank Holton ==
Frank E. Holton was born March 10, 1858, in Allegan, Michigan to farmers Otis (b. 1827) and Hanna A. (b. 1829) Holton. He grew up with three sisters: Emma E. Holton, Alice Holton and Leona Holton. By the time he was 34, Frank Holton was an accomplished trombone player and principal trombone of the Sousa Band, a role that would later be filled by Arthur Pryor. In 1885 he had partnered with James Warren York in York & Holton, before he established his own company in 1898.

Frank Holton's wife Florence was a music teacher. They had no children. Frank Holton, though not an instrument maker himself, expanded his company to manufacture instruments which was his occupation until retiring at age 80. Frank Holton died after a protracted illness on April 16, 1942, at the age of 84.

== The Frank Holton Company ==
=== Chicago ===
Frank Holton's first business venture on his own was a small rented shop with a desk, two counters and two chairs that he had to paint himself at Clark and Madison streets in Chicago, in 1898, where he sold used instruments and his own formula slide oil for trombone. Unable to make the rent at times, Holton was known to pawn instruments at a shop on Clark Street between 1898 and 1900.

By 1907, a skilled horn maker had been hired, and the production of Holton instruments required the construction of a factory on the West Side of Chicago. It would be home to Frank Holton & Company for only a decade.

=== Elkhorn ===
In April 1918, Holton opened a factory in Elkhorn, Wisconsin moving over 200 employees and 85 carloads of machinery from Chicago. The city had lured Holton to Elkhorn through the efforts of a group of local businessmen, who, acting under city mandate, built the new factory which was turned over to Holton and Co. upon their arrival. That building remained as the core of the Holton factory until the decision in 2008 to merge Holton horn production with King and Conn instruments in Eastlake, Ohio.

While the factory had been paid for by the city of Elkhorn, the cost of training skilled labor resulted in the first profits there not being seen until 1920.

Along with machinery and employees, Holton brought the company band to Elkhorn which would quickly merge with the storied Elkhorn Band, which had been founded in 1840 by Charles Seelye only 3 years after the town of Elkhorn itself. The band had served as the 12th Regimental Band from 1861 to 1864 during the Civil War.

Already building a full line of high-end brass instruments, Holton recognized the growth of music in the schools and began selling student-line instruments built by other workshops under the trade names Pertin and Beaufort. Holton also began production of saxophones in the late Chicago days, and would remain in production of such instruments into the post World War II era. Holton saxophones never enjoyed the reputation or sales of their competitors C.G. Conn, Buescher, Martin, or King, but generate interest for the idiosyncratic keywork on some early models. In the early 1930s the Holton Collegiate line of student horns was introduced, which would last through the 1970s. After 2004 the defunct Collegiate line was re-introduced by Conn-Selmer under their Holton brand, again targeting a balance of quality and price suitable for school music programs.

In addition to building the company in Elkhorn, Frank Holton also built a subdivision of 5 and 6 room bungalows in 1919. The 25 homes were priced in the $3,000 to $4,000 range.

=== Post Frank Holton ===
After retiring, at age 82 Frank Holton sold the company to employee William Kull. The company was run from that point forward by sales manager Elliot Kehl, though Kull would retain the title CEO until he died in 1944.

During World War II, the company performed defense work, as did most all instrument manufacturers. Following the war, Elliot Kehl secured a controlling interest in the company and began development of several new products including the Farkas Model French horn and a new line of saxophones. The Stratodyne was Holton's top line saxophone from 1948 to 1958 and the last model sold as a professional saxophone by Holton.

Holton became the supplier for Leblanc's Vito line of student-line brasswinds and (briefly) saxophones in 1951. Leblanc acquired Holton in 1964 and phased out the Collegiate saxophone line in favor of their Vito-branded instruments. The Collegiate brand for brasswinds was terminated in 1980. From 1971 on, Leblanc used the Martin Committee brand on some Holton model brasswinds.

=== Under Conn-Selmer ===
Leblanc was acquired by Conn-Selmer in 2004. In 2008, the Elkhorn factory was closed and production was moved to the Eastlake, Ohio plant that produces King and C.G. Conn brasswinds. Conn-Selmer currently produces Holton-branded cornets, trumpets, french horns, trombones, and slide and valve oil. Some of the featured products built during the post-acquisition period include:

- The Holton Collegiate and New Collegiate line of student brasswinds
- The Maynard Ferguson trumpet series
- The Farkas Model French horn
- The Merker-Matic series of French horns
- The Harvey Phillips Model tubas
- Frank Holton's trombone slide oil (the original formulation) and valve oil

== Holton artists ==
The Holton company relied on endorsement by leading artists as one of its primary marketing tools. Often these artists collaborated on the design of instruments that they would then play and promote. Some would subsequently leave Holton to build instruments themselves.

Among these were :

- Frank Holton (1858–1942), the former lead trombone with the Sousa Band and an accomplished performer who could demonstrate his product.
- Ernst Albert Couturier (1869–1950), cornet virtuoso and instrument maker behind the Holton Couturier New Model, performed as a Holton artist from 1907 until starting his own firm in 1916.
- Vincent Bach (1890–1976), cornet and trumpet player and manufacturer of trumpets and mouthpieces performed as a Holton artist in 1917-18 prior to starting his own firm.
- Edward Llewellyn (d. 1936), principal trumpet of the Chicago Symphony, began performing as a Holton artist in 1919.
- Renold Schilke (1910–1982), principal trumpet of the Chicago Symphony and instrument maker, performed as a member of the Holton-sponsored Chicago Symphony Brass Ensemble in the 1950s.
- Philip Farkas (1914–1992), principal horn of the Chicago Symphony, left what became Schilke Music Products in 1956 and joined with Holton, designing the Holton Farkas Model french horn.
- Ethel Merker (1923-2012), prominent horn player in Chicago, collaborated in the design and development of the Merker-Matic line of horns.
- Maynard Ferguson (1928–2006), trumpet and flugelhorn virtuoso and namesake of the Holton Maynard Ferguson Trumpet line, performed as a Holton artist and designer starting in the 1960s.
- Harvey Phillips (1929–2010), tuba player, professor, creator of the Harvey Phillips Foundation and Tuba Christmas, and namesake of the Holton Phillips Model Tuba teamed with Holton in the 1990s.
- Matthew Liu (b.1986), professional French Horn player with Kim Seng Wind Symphony and the Wind Ensemble Nippon Singapore (WENS) and engineer.

Not all ventures with artists were successful. The Holton Falcone Model baritone horn, developed at the end of the 1970s with input from the namesake of the Leonard Falcone International Tuba and Euphonium Festival was dropped after only a short run when Leonard Falcone refused to endorse or play on the production version. There is no record of the popular 1920s saxophone player Rudy Wiedoeft ever having played on his namesake instrument produced by Holton.
