= Louis Dufrasne =

Belgian-American horn player

Louis Victor Dufrasne (December 1, 1878 – July 1, 1941) was a Belgian-American horn player known for his roles as principal horn in several major American orchestras and opera companies, and as a teacher whose students included Philip Farkas.

== Biography ==
Dufrasne was born in Quiévrain, Belgium. He graduated with high honors from the Royal Conservatory of Ghent and became recognized as one of the leading horn players in Belgium, serving as principal horn in the National Opera of Belgium and with an orchestra in Pau, France, and as third horn in the Scottish Orchestra (Glasgow).

After emigrating to the United States in 1907, he became first horn in the Pittsburgh Symphony Orchestra, followed by the same position in the Cleveland Orchestra and the Chicago Opera, where he spent most of his career. He also held a position in the NBC Symphony (Chicago) and taught at Northwestern University.

Known for endurance and perfection, he was frequently praised in the press and often performed as a soloist.

== Teaching ==
Dufrasne was a highly regarded teacher. Philip Farkas began studying with him in 1930, making the weekly journey by public transit from his home on Chicago's south side to Dufrasne's home in the north shore suburb of Evanston. Farkas credited Dufrasne's guidance as the key influence responsible for his initial success and as the single biggest influence in his life.

His studies were later incorporated into Tonal Flexibility Studies for French Horn by William Mercier (1948), a method book dedicated to Dufrasne and considered an important document in American horn pedagogy. A revised edition was published by Thomas Bacon in 2005.

== See also ==
- Embouchure
- Philip Farkas
