= Jerome Callet =

American musical artist (1930–2019)

- Born: April 24, 1930
- Died: May 13, 2019 (aged 89)
- Instrument: Trumpet

Jerome Callet (April 24, 1930 – May 13, 2019) was a brass embouchure clinician, and designer of brass instruments and mouthpieces.

Callet rediscovered the original brass embouchure technique utilized in Europe during the baroque era, which at the time was only passed on verbally from trumpet guild members to their sons, and subsequently, by the great classical and jazz players of the first half of the 20th century. While this technique was described in written form within the first brass instruction books published in France in the late 1800s, as well as some American trumpet method books from the early 20th century, the instructions were mistranslated by subsequent generations of teachers, altering the trajectory and quality of brass playing and instruction for the past 100 years. Callet subsequently began creating and manufacturing his own line of trumpets and mouthpieces, for he believed that most modern trumpet equipment was designed to compensate for the failures of modern trumpet playing and teaching.

Born April 24, 1930, in Pittsburgh, Pennsylvania, Callet began his trumpet studies at age thirteen after being inspired by two fellow students, Cal Massey and Tommy Turrentine, at Herron Hill Junior High School in Pittsburgh. Although he subsequently studied with several well known and accomplished trumpet instructors in the Pittsburgh area and dedicated himself laboriously to mastering the instrument, by the age of thirty Callet could still not play a high C. In 1947, after many years of struggle, Callet began researching the physical elements necessary to develop a "Super Power Embouchure", such as those developed by players such as Harry James, Charlie Shavers, Horst Fischer, Maurice Andre, and Maynard Ferguson. In 1970, at the age of 40, and after much trial and error, Callet had developed his new embouchure, and named it Superchops. The Superchops embouchure methodology eventually led him on the quest to design and produce the best trumpets and mouthpieces available.

Callet's involvement with the business of instruments began with sixteen years in sales (1953–1968) for Elden Benge, followed by eight years of experience with Dominick Calicchio (1968–1975). He absorbed much of his knowledge of trumpet making from these two brilliant men. With this rich background and his talent as an accomplished machinist, Mr. Callet was able to release his first line of trumpet mouthpieces in 1973, and his first trumpet under his own brand name in 1984. In 1973, he also developed a line of mouthpieces to complement his embouchure theories. In the meantime, he taught embouchure technique in Pittsburgh (1960) and New York (from 1972 to April 2019).

The fulfillment of his quest to create the best brass instruments possible culminated with his "New York Soloist" B♭ trumpet, released in 2013 (built by Kanstul), and his 1ss, 1sc, and 1sb trumpet mouthpieces, released in 2017 (built by Jim New). Callet's historical legacy of trumpet manufacturing is represented by his "Sima Bb", "Sima C", "Sima D/Eb", "Jazz Bb", "Superchops Bb", "Symphonique Bb", "Symphonique C", "Stratosphere Bb", and previous "Soloist Bb" trumpets, as well as his "Grand Prix" flugelhorn, his earlier "Jazz" and "NY" flugelhorns, and his "Jazz" trombone. More than 6,000 Callet trumpets and 15,000 Callet mouthpieces were manufactured overall.

Callet published five books on trumpet embouchure and technique, including Trumpet Secrets (2002), Beyond Arban (1991), Superchops (1987), Brass Power and Endurance (1974), and Trumpet Yoga (1971), as well as the Master Superchops DVD (2007). Callet also conducted brass embouchure clinics in the United States, Canada, Germany, Finland, Switzerland, France, Denmark, Hungary and Japan.

== Bibliography ==
- Trumpet yoga: The ultimate modern trumpet embouchure, 1971.
- Brass power and endurance, 1974.
- Superchops: The virtuoso embouchure method for trumpet and brass. 1987.
- Beyond Arban. 1991.
- Trumpet Secrets, Volume 1. 2002
