= Vincent Bach =

- Also known as: Vincent Schrottenbach
- Born: Vincent Freiherr von Schrottenbach; March 24, 1890; Baden bei Wien, Austria-Hungary
- Died: January 8, 1976 (aged 85) New York City, U.S.
- Occupations: Musician, Manufacturer
- Instrument: Trumpet
- Label: Edison Records
- Formerly of: Boston Symphony Orchestra, Metropolitan Opera

Vincent Freiherr von Schrottenbach (March 24, 1890 – January 8, 1976), known professionally as Vincent Bach, was an Austrian and American musician and instrument maker, who founded the Vincent Bach Corporation.

== Vincent von Schrottenbach ==
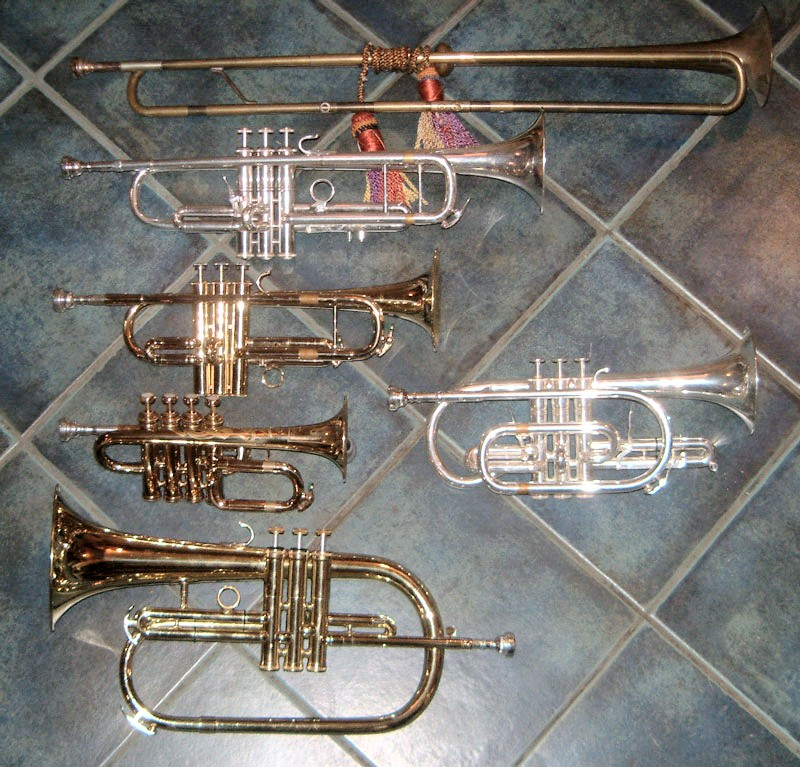
Brass instruments

He was born as Vincent Freiherr von Schrottenbach in Baden bei Wien near Vienna, Austria. He received training on the violin and bugle as a youth switching to trumpet at age 12. At age 15, he purchased his first instrument, a rotary valve trumpet. Bach desired to be a musician, but that career was not supported by his family.

Bach graduated from Maschinenbauschule with an engineering degree, at the age of 20. During his subsequent compulsory military service, he served in the Austro-Hungarian Imperial Navy. That was followed by a period as an elevator operator before being called up a second time during which he served as a military musician in the Austrian Marine Band.

His military experience inspired him to go against his family's wishes and pursue a career in music. Vincent Schrottenbach toured Europe performing on an Alexander cornet, but while in England in 1914 became entangled in the politics of World War I finding it necessary to escape confinement as an enemy alien. He changed his name to Vincent Bach and fled to the United States.

== Vincent Bach, American ==
Upon his arrival with a Besson cornet, he wrote to Karl Muck, conductor of the Boston Symphony, who had him audition for an associate who, despite the audition being on cornet, immediately hired him and sent him to Boston. Through fellow Boston trumpeter Gustav Heim Bach was introduced to the Frank Holton Company and began playing a 1914 Low-Pitch-Only New Holton Trumpet, with which he was photographed for BSO publicity. A year later, he was performing as principal trumpet with the Metropolitan Opera. During his first 3 years in the US, Bach pursued many musical ventures including composing solos, recording on the Edison label, writing a short pamphlet version of his later The Art of Trumpet Playing and endorsing Holton instruments. His vaudeville touring included July 1915 performances in San Francisco and Los Angeles.

While touring in Pittsburgh, Bach's mouthpiece was destroyed by a repairman's attempts to rework it. On his return to New York, Bach began experimenting with brass mouthpieces. Bach also realized the need for a higher quality instruments when he served as bandmaster of the 306th Field Artillery band as a result of finding himself inducted once again, this time in the American military during World War 1.

He was married on 29 April 1925 to Esther Staab in New York City.

The last time Vincent Bach took a job as a performer was during 1926, one year after attaining his US citizenship when he accepted one more orchestral position for only a matter of months. His only other public performances were as a soloist on the radio and records between 1927 and 1929 promoting his instruments.

As of April 1927 he was first-chair of the six trumpets in the orchestra at the Roxy Theater in New York, while continuing his manufacturing business.

== Bach company ==
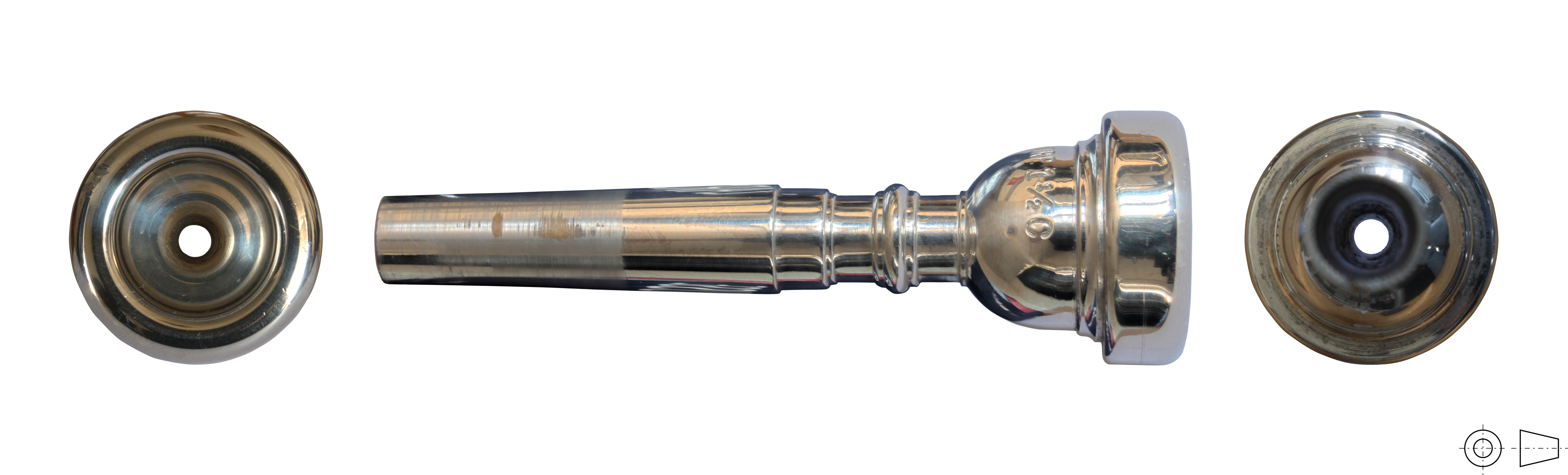
Vincent Bach trumpet mouthpiece

Bach established a mouthpiece business in the back of the Selmer music store in New York after being released from the military in 1918, and by 1920 was advertising a business location at 204 E. 85th. He expanded to the production of trumpets and cornets under the "Stradivarius" name (to project an image of quality) in 1924. By 1928, he relocated to a Bronx factory adding trombones to his product line. The company survived the depression and by 1953 moved to Mount Vernon New York. Collaborating with Georges Mager, during World War II, Bach developed the large bore C Trumpet that would become the standard of symphonic trumpeters in America. In 1961, at 71 years of age, Bach sold his company to the Conn-Selmer corporation even though some of the other 13 bids he received were higher.

Bach's instruments attained the reputation for quality he aspired to with the name and became widely used. Two of Bach's bugles figured prominently in the funerals of US presidents: One played for John F. Kennedy, Dwight Eisenhower and Lyndon Johnson, and is on display at Arlington National Cemetery; A second one played at the funeral of Ronald Reagan and was subsequently retired to the Reagan Library. This was chosen after a week-long process in which the Reagan family, Bach's grand-nephew (John Vincent Bach), the military and the bugler involved decided not to use the Kennedy bugle in favor of the one that the performer had used for two decades.

== Later years ==
After the sale of the business, Vincent Bach stayed on as a researcher continuing to work until at least 1974. Bach died January 8, 1976, in New York. He is buried in Kensico Cemetery in Valhalla, New York.

== See also ==
- Vincent Bach Corporation
