= Lyon & Healy =

American harp manufacturer

- Type: Subsidiary
- Industry: Musical instruments
- Founded: October 14, 1864; 162 years ago
- Founder: George Washburn Lyon; Patrick Joseph Healy
- Headquarters: 168 North Ogden Avenue, Chicago, Illinois, U.S.
- Number of locations: 2
- Area served: Worldwide
- Key people: Marco Salvi (president)
- Products: Harps
- Number of employees: 135
- Parent: Salvi Harps
- Website: www.lyonhealy.com

Lyon & Healy Harps, Inc. is an American musical instrument manufacturer based in Chicago, Illinois and is a subsidiary of Salvi Harps, but also has a layered corporate structure. Today best known for concert harps, the company's Chicago headquarters and manufacturing facility contains a showroom and concert hall. George W. Lyon and Patrick J. Healy began the company in 1864 as a sheet music shop. By the end of the 19th century, they manufactured a wide range of musical instruments—including not only harps, but pianos, guitars, mandolins, banjos, ukuleles and various brass and other percussion instruments.

Today, Lyon & Healy harps are widely played by professional musicians, since they are one of the few makers of harps for orchestral use—which are known as concert harps or pedal harps. Lyon & Healy also makes smaller folk harps or lever harps (based on traditional Irish and Scottish instruments) that use levers to change string pitch instead of pedals. In the 1980s, Lyon & Healy also began to manufacture electroacoustic harps and, later, solid body electric harps.

== History ==
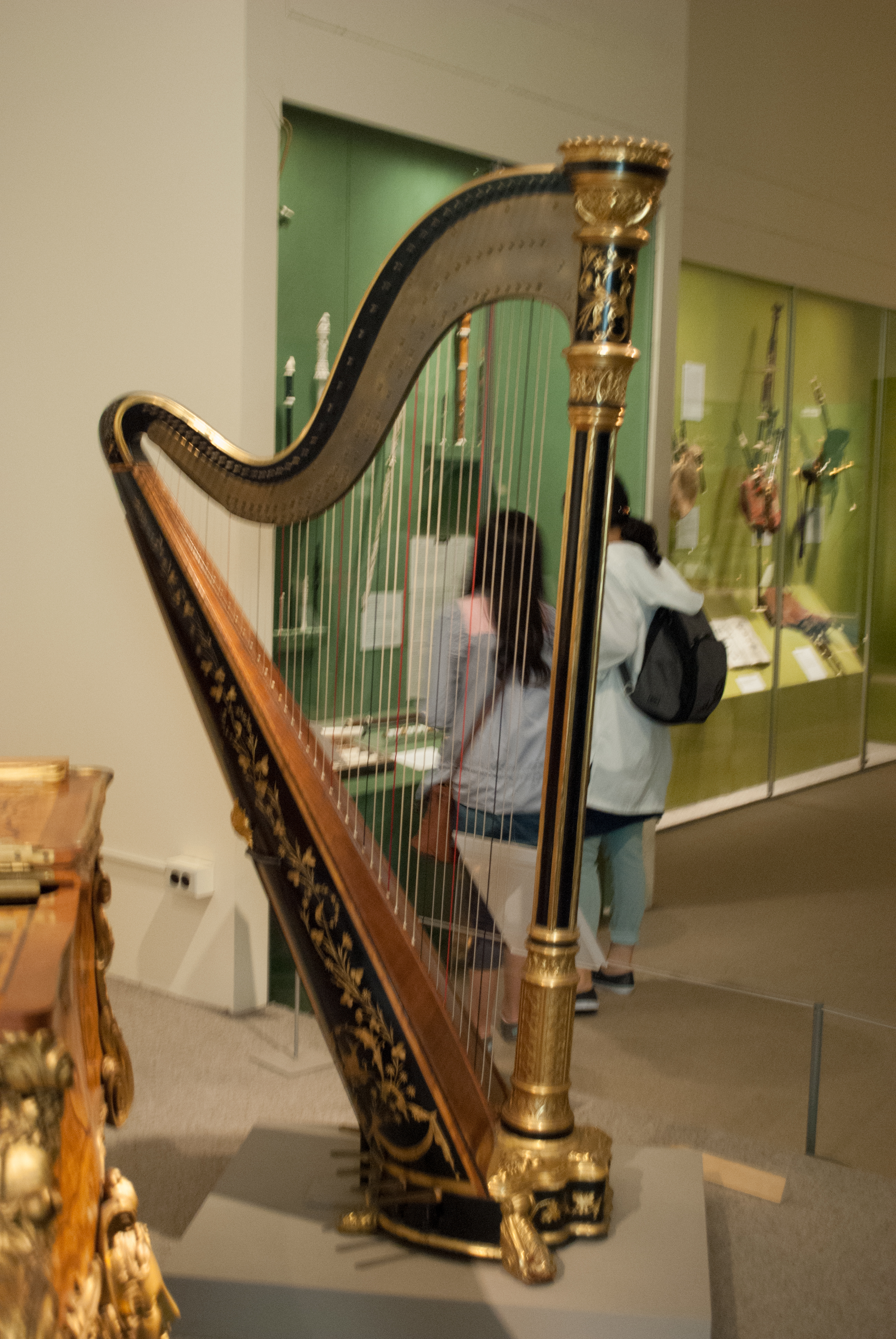
Lyon & Healy pedal harp (1891–95)

George W. Lyon, a native of Northborough, Massachusetts; and Patrick J. Healy, born in Mallow, Ireland, founded the company in 1864, after they moved from Boston to start a sheet music shop for music publisher Oliver Ditson. Determining Lyon & Healy's history is complicated because its building and company records were destroyed in two fires, including the Great Chicago Fire of 1871. Two smaller fires did little damage to the firm and did not result in data loss.

Company letters and trade catalogs don't provide exact dates that would reveal when Lyon & Healy began manufacturing instruments. An article in the Musical Courier states that Lyon & Healy began manufacturing instruments in 1885. Clearly, Lyon & Healy was making fretted string instruments in the 1880s, with Washburn (guitars, mandolins, banjos, and zithers) as their premier line. By the 1900s, if not earlier, Lyon & Healy might well have been manufacturing bowed string instruments.

According to Vintage Guitar magazine, "Circa 1900, the firm was so large it manufactured under a host of sub-brands; Washburn is perhaps the most recognized, though Leland, Lakeside, and American Conservatory are still seen."

Lyon & Healy also made various percussion instruments. Later, Lyon & Healy began manufacturing brass instruments, possibly as early as the 1890s. Lyon & Healy also repaired instruments, and offered engraving services. Complicating matters still further, Lyon & Healy engraved instruments that it retailed but did not actually manufacture. In its 1892 catalog, it claimed that it manufactured 100,000 instruments annually.

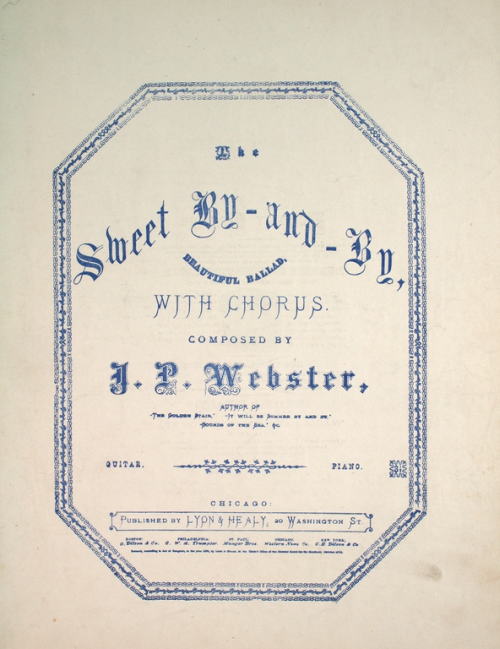
"The Sweet By and By" sheet music (1868)

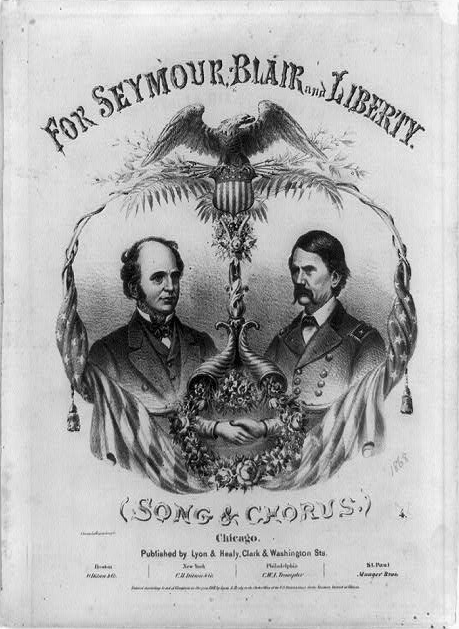
Cover of Northern (Chicago) campaign song book (1868)

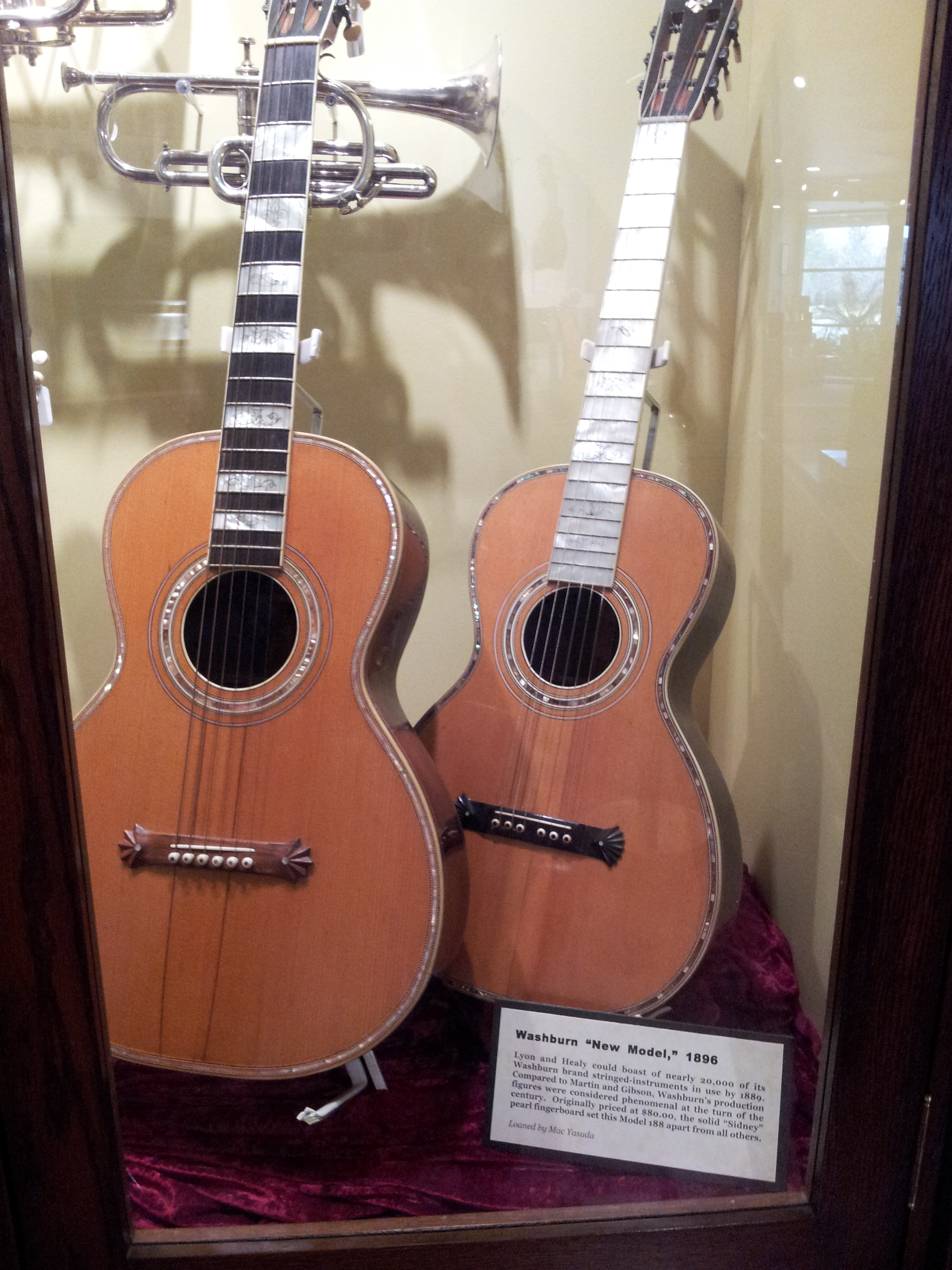
Washburn parlor guitars (1894/96)

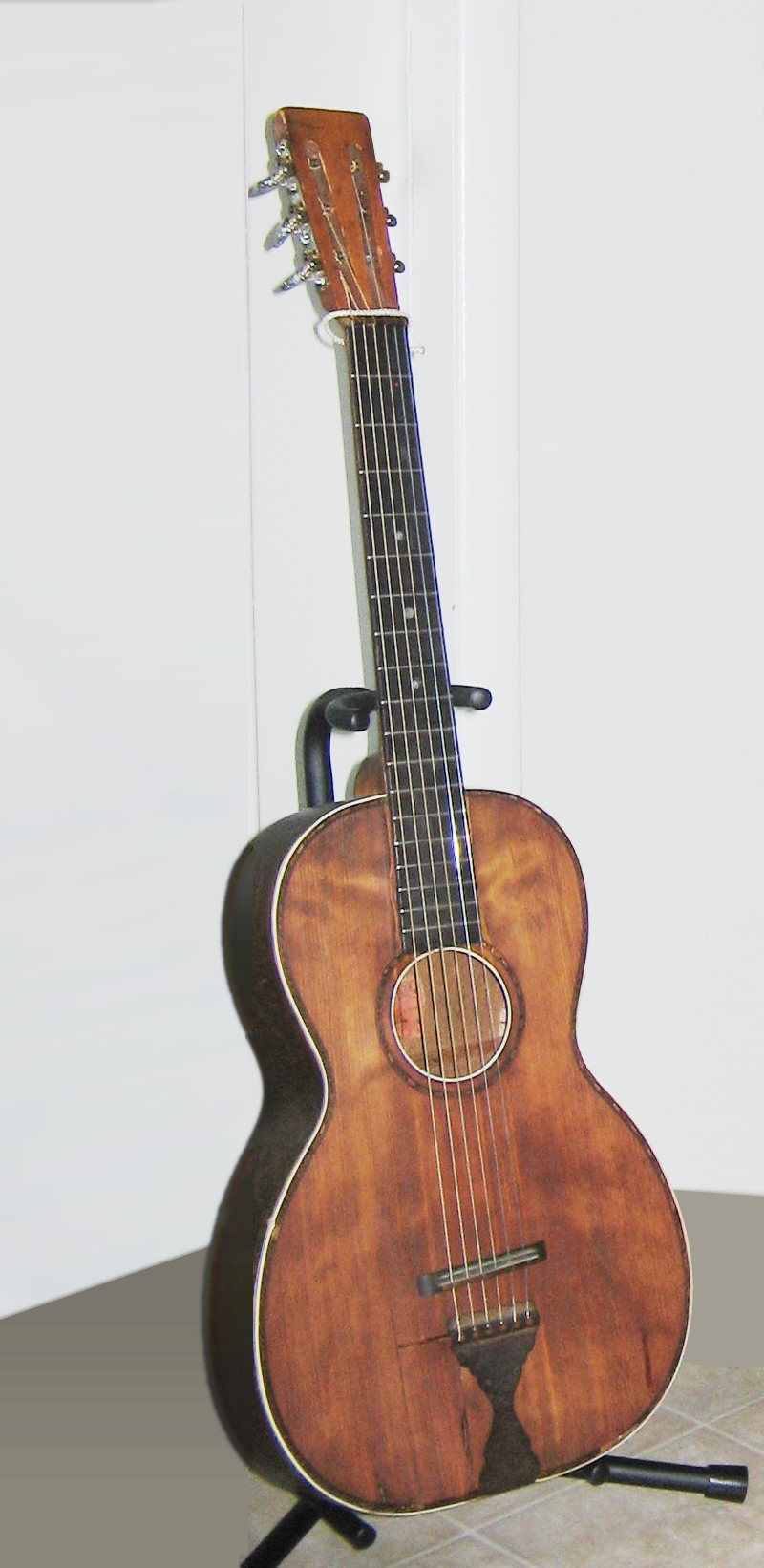
Lakeside guitar (1900s)

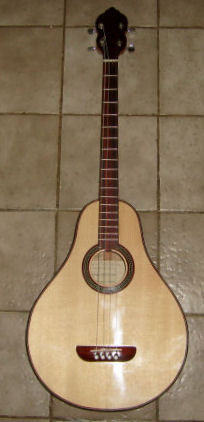
Lyon & Healey tenor guitar (replica)

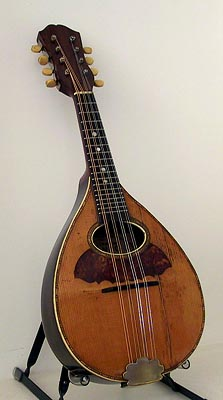
Leland piccolo mandolin (1911)

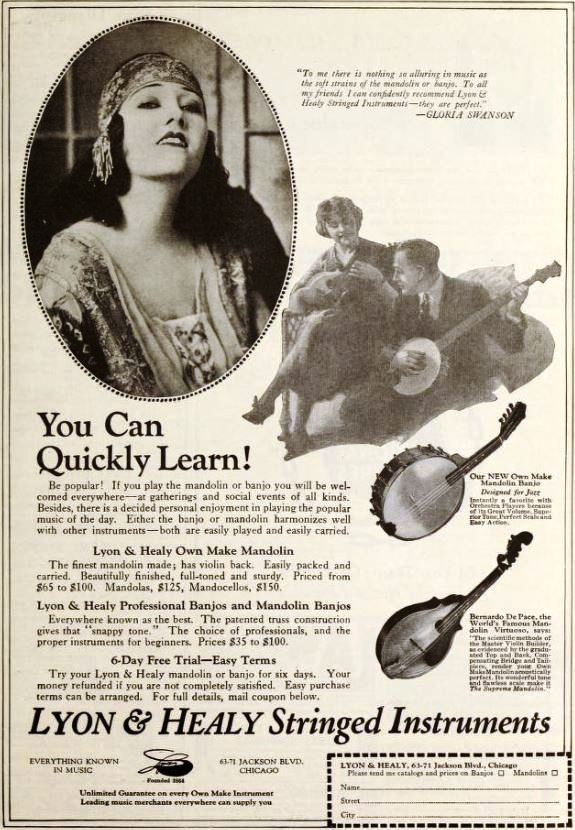
Advertisement for banjos, mandolin banjos and violin-back mandolins (1921)

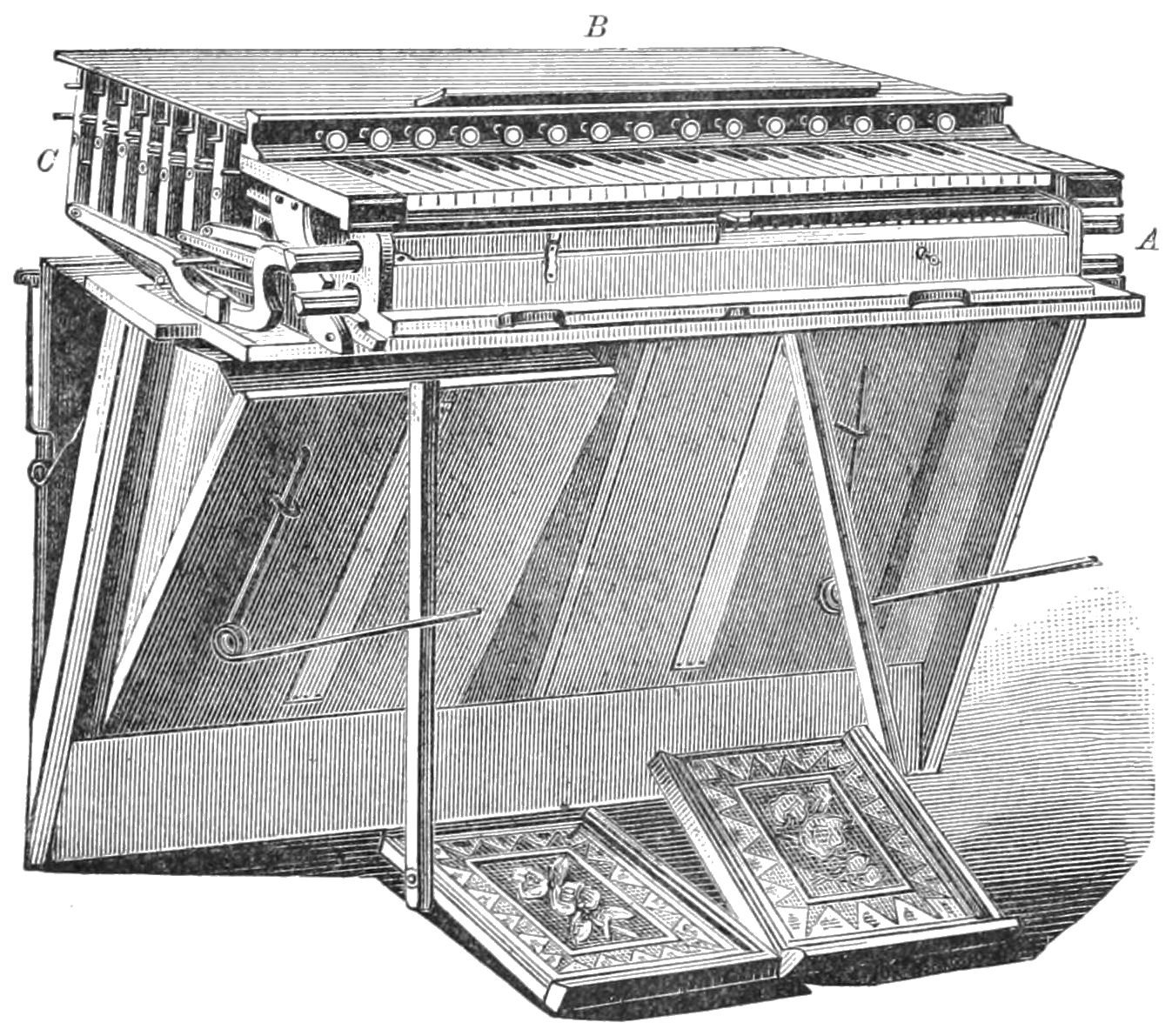
Lyon & Healy reed organ's inside (Peloubet system)

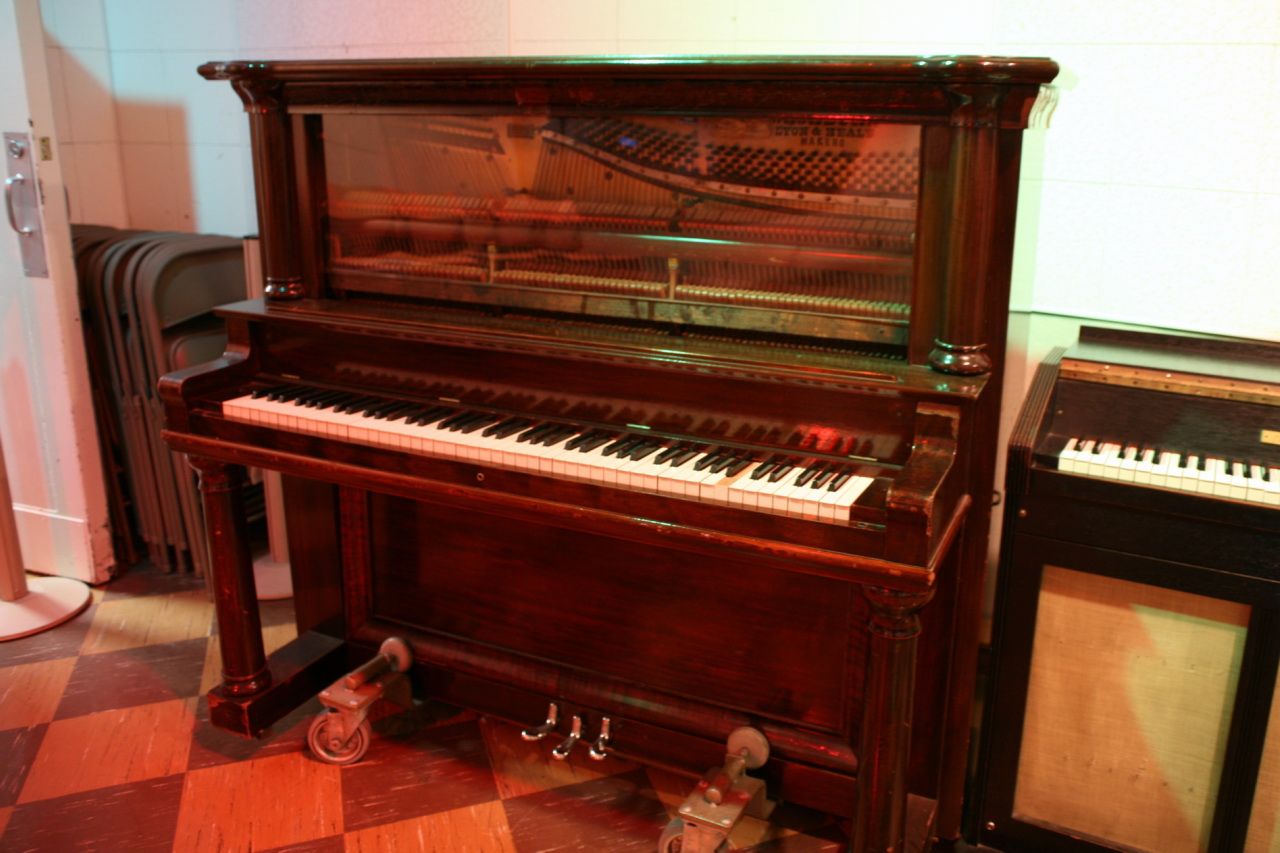
Lyon & Healy upright piano

For a period of time, 1876 to the Great Depression, the "Golden Age" of piano making, the company hand made pianos and reed organs in addition to harps. Like their harps, Lyon & Healy put the highest quality and craftsmanship in building these instruments. In addition to making grand pianos, George W. Lyon patented his cottage upright in 1878. Its top-of-the-line pianos were sold under the Lyon & Healy name. Their pianos have been described as being remarkably powerful, clear, and having a singing tone. Some have compared the Lyon & Healy grand pianos to other high end brands of the time such as Steinway & Sons, Wm. Knabe & Co., and Sohmer. Lower cost pianos were sold by Lyon & Healy under various other brand names. Like most other Golden Age piano companies, they stopped making pianos during the Great Depression.

Lyon retired in 1889 and Healy became the company's first president. That year, Lyon & Healy built their first harp. Healy wanted to develop a harp better suited to the rigors of the American climate than available European models. They successfully produced a harp notable for its strength, pitch reliability, and freedom from unwanted vibration. Previously, most harps in North America were made by small groups of craftsmen in France, England, Ireland, or Italy.

In 1890, Lyon & Healy introduced the Style 23 Harp, still a popular and recognizable design. It has 47 strings, highly decorative floral carving on the top of the column, base, and feet, and a fleur de lis pattern at the bottom of the column. It is available in a gold version. It is 74 inches (190 cm) tall, and weighs about 37 kilograms (82 lb). Lyon & Healy produces one of the most ornate and elaborate harps in the world, the Louis XV, which includes carvings of leaves, flowers, scrolls, and shells along its neck and kneeblock, as well the soundboard edges.

Lyon would later form a new company with E.A. Potter called Lyon & Potter, and remained there until his death on January 12, 1894. Healy died of pneumonia on April 3, 1905.

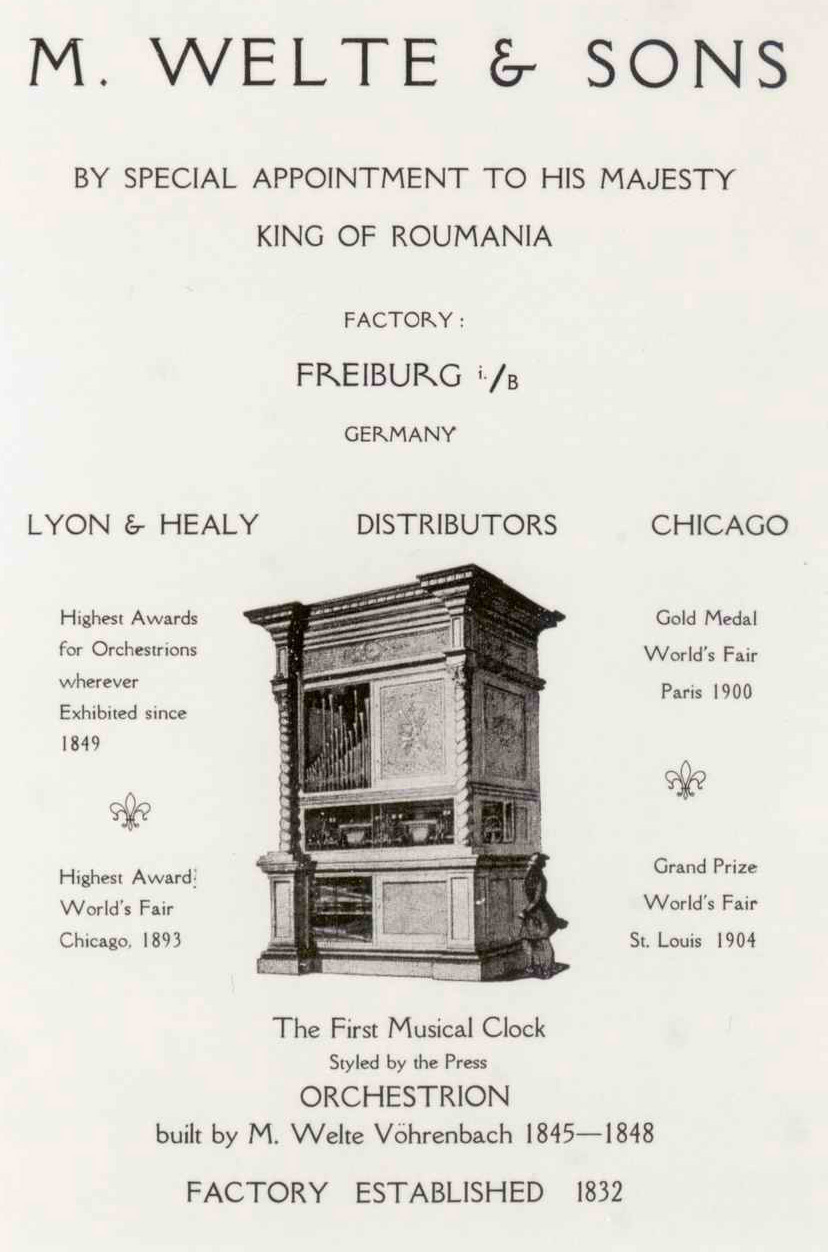
Prospectus (1900s) on Welte Orchestrion

In the 1890s the company—which used the slogan,"Everything in music"—began building pipe organs. In 1894 Robert J. Bennett came to Lyon & Healy from the Hutchings company of Boston to head their organ department. The largest surviving Lyon & Healy pipe organ is at the Our Lady of Sorrows Basilica in Chicago. It is a large organ of four manuals and 57 ranks of pipes.

They also made small pipe organs. An example survives at St. Mary's Catholic Church in Aspen Colorado. It is a two manual tracker with a 30 note straight pedalboard and 7 ranks. It is believed to have been built around 1900, and can still be pumped by hand.

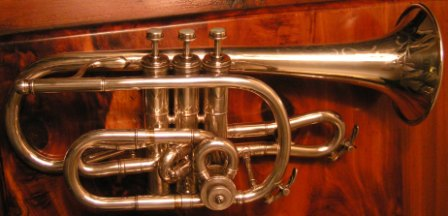
E.A. Couturier was bought in 1920s

By the 1900s, Lyon & Healy was one of the largest music publishers in the world, and was a major producer of musical instruments. However, In late 1920s, Lyon & Healy sold its brass musical instrument manufacturing branch (see "New Langwill Index"). In the 1970s, the firm concentrated solely upon making and selling harps.

Carlos Salzedo, the pre-eminent harpist, collaborated with Lyon & Healy on the design of their Art Nouveau model Style 11, still made today. Later, in 1928, Lyon & Healy introduced one of the most unusual harps ever mass-produced, the Salzedo Model. It was named for Salzedo, and designed by the artist Witold Gordon. It is an Art Deco style instrument that incorporates bold red and silver stripes on the soundboard, with squared layers of five in the base and column, and instead of the usual curved-edge sounding board, an angular one to combine the features of both the straight-sided sounding board with the expanded sound of the extended sounding board. Its design is considered by experts to be a work of fine art, that utilizes light and shadow to give it additional dimension, as well as a distinct appearance.

Lyon & Healy has mostly employed numbers to name its varied models of pedal harps, and they can be confused as sometimes a number, such as 23, was used for more than one model. The current range of models can be viewed on the company website, as well as those of major harp dealers, but in the used harp listings, you may find the older models of differing designs. All are notable for their elegance and attention to detail. There was an additional Washburn line of smaller, simpler pedal harps sold to many schools in the early 20th century. Lyon & Healy's Style 23 harp is widely considered the gold standard of tone quality. Each model may differ slightly, as the column design has some effect on the projection of the sound waves generated by the instrument. While the same woods are generally used, each instrument is to some degree individual in sound from its birth, and gains more individuality as it is played.

In the 1960s, Lyon & Healy introduced a smaller lever harp, the Troubadour, a 36-string harp marketed to beginners with rent-to-buy options and group classes. This harp stands 65.5 inches (166 cm), and weighs 17 kilograms (37 lb). Much later, they introduced the Ogden, which is a bit smaller, but has 37 strings, and then the Prelude, which is considerably larger, and styled more like a pedal harp. Between the Troubadour and Ogden models, there was an Egan model, but it was discontinued.

In the late 1970s, Steinway & Sons (then owned by CBS) purchased Lyon & Healy and soon after closed all retail stores, which sold sheet music and musical instruments, to focus on harp production.

By 1985, Lyon & Healy also made folk harps, also known as Irish harps, which are even smaller than the Troubadour. The "Shamrock model folk harp" has 34 strings. It stands 55 inches (140 cm) tall with its legs. The legs can be removed so the player can hold the instrument lap—style on the knees. It weighs about 10 kilograms (22 lb). It features Celtic designs on the soundboard. An Irish or folk harp player is sometimes called a harper rather than harpist.

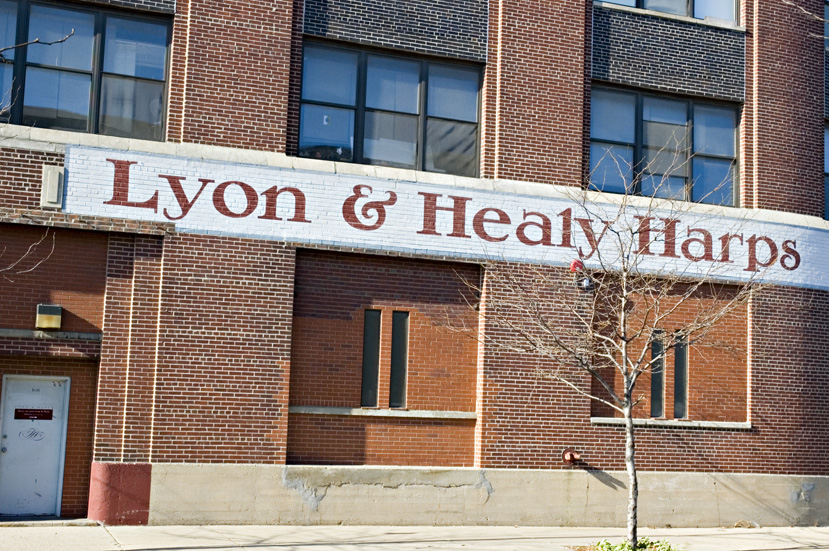
The Lyon & Healy building at 168 North Ogden Avenue in Chicago, Illinois, as seen in a 2006 photograph.

DePaul University now owns the Wabash building. Lyon & Healy harps are still in Chicago, Illinois, at 168 North Ogden Avenue. The building was once home to the recording studios of Orlando R. Marsh. They are in the process of moving to a new building farther west of the Chicago Loop.

== Craftsmanship ==
Wood in harp construction varies by instrument, but Sitka Spruce (Picea sitchensis) is the most common soundboard wood. Various Lyon & Healy guitars, mandolins, and many other instrument types reside in major musical instrument museums in the U.S. and Europe.

Lyon and Healy now primarily manufactures four types of harps—the lever harp, petite pedal harp, semi-grande pedal harp, and concert grand harp. They also make limited numbers of special harps called concert grands. Lyon & Healy makes electric lever harps in nontraditional colors such as pink, green, blue, and red.

== Lyon & Healy Corporation ==
Lyon & Healy Corporation is a musical product distribution company in North America representing brands such as Paoletti Guitars, Bacci Guitars, Chapman Guitars, Magneto Guitars, Batson Guitars, MarconiLAB, Red Sound, Dophix, SIM1, Delta, and Acus Sound Engineering.

== See also ==
- Washburn Guitars
- List of Stradivarius instruments
