= Elden Benge =

Trumpet player and manufacturer

Elden Eugene Benge (July 12, 1904, in Winterset, Iowa – December 13, 1960, in Los Angeles, California), was the principal trumpet of the Detroit Symphony Orchestra from 1928–1933; he held the same position in the Chicago Symphony Orchestra from 1933-1939. After moving to Chicago he began to experiment with designing his own trumpet, taking measurements from his personal instrument, a French Besson. By the end of 1935, using pre-made components along with parts he fashioned, he constructed a trumpet for his own use.

He continued refining the process and began selling the instruments, until, in 1937, he was able to manufacture and assemble trumpets using parts solely made in his home workshop. In 1939 he started to advertise the Benge Company, and he continued making trumpets in his Chicago home until 1953. In part due to a severe case of spinal arthritis, he moved to Burbank, California, where he continued to make “The World’s Finest Trumpet” until his death on December 13, 1960.

After Elden Benge's death, the company was run by his son Donald Benge, who later went on to be the creator of the widely successful Conquest board game. The company enjoyed a very strong reputation among professional players in the Los Angeles area recording industry during the 1960s. In general the company did very little advertising and sold trumpets mostly to professionals and serious students through a network of professional players. In December 1970, Donald Benge sold the company to Leisure Time Industries and production was moved from the Benge garage to an upstairs shop in downtown Los Angeles above Lockie Music Exchange, also owned by Leisure Time. In 1972 the company was bought by King Musical Instruments, then a subsidiary of the Seeburg Corporation, who moved production to Anaheim, California and increased production substantially. King and related assets were acquired by Seeburg's creditors under bankruptcy in 1979 then sold to Daniel J. Henkin (1930 - 2012), owner of C. G. Conn, in 1983. King discontinued production in Anaheim and used the "Benge" name for a different model of trumpets mass-produced in Eastlake, Ohio starting in 1983. In 1985 King was acquired by the Swedish venture capital firm Skåne Gripen, then joined with C. G. Conn the following year to form United Musical Instruments (UMI). Ownership of UMI passed to Steinway Musical Instruments in 2000, who put the UMI assets under their Conn-Selmer subsidiary in 2003. Conn-Selmer discontinued production under the "Benge" name in 2005.

Production of Benge-style trumpets, branded Burbank, was resumed by Kanstul Musical Instruments Company in Fullerton, CA, in 1985. Many of Elden Benge's original design models were marketed as "The Burbank Trumpet" by the Michael Thomas Music Company and produced for Michael Thomas by The Kanstul Musical Instruments Company of Anaheim, California.

Production History of The Benge Trumpet city by city:

Chicago IL 1937-53; *BURBANK CA 1953-70; Los Angeles CA 1970-72; Anaheim CA 1972-83; Eastlake OH, 1983 - 2005 (end of production)

Production History of THE *BURBANK TRUMPET (Benge model) city by city:

Fullerton, CA, 1985-1991; Anaheim, CA, 1991 - present
