= Mouthpiece (brass) =

Part of a brass instrument

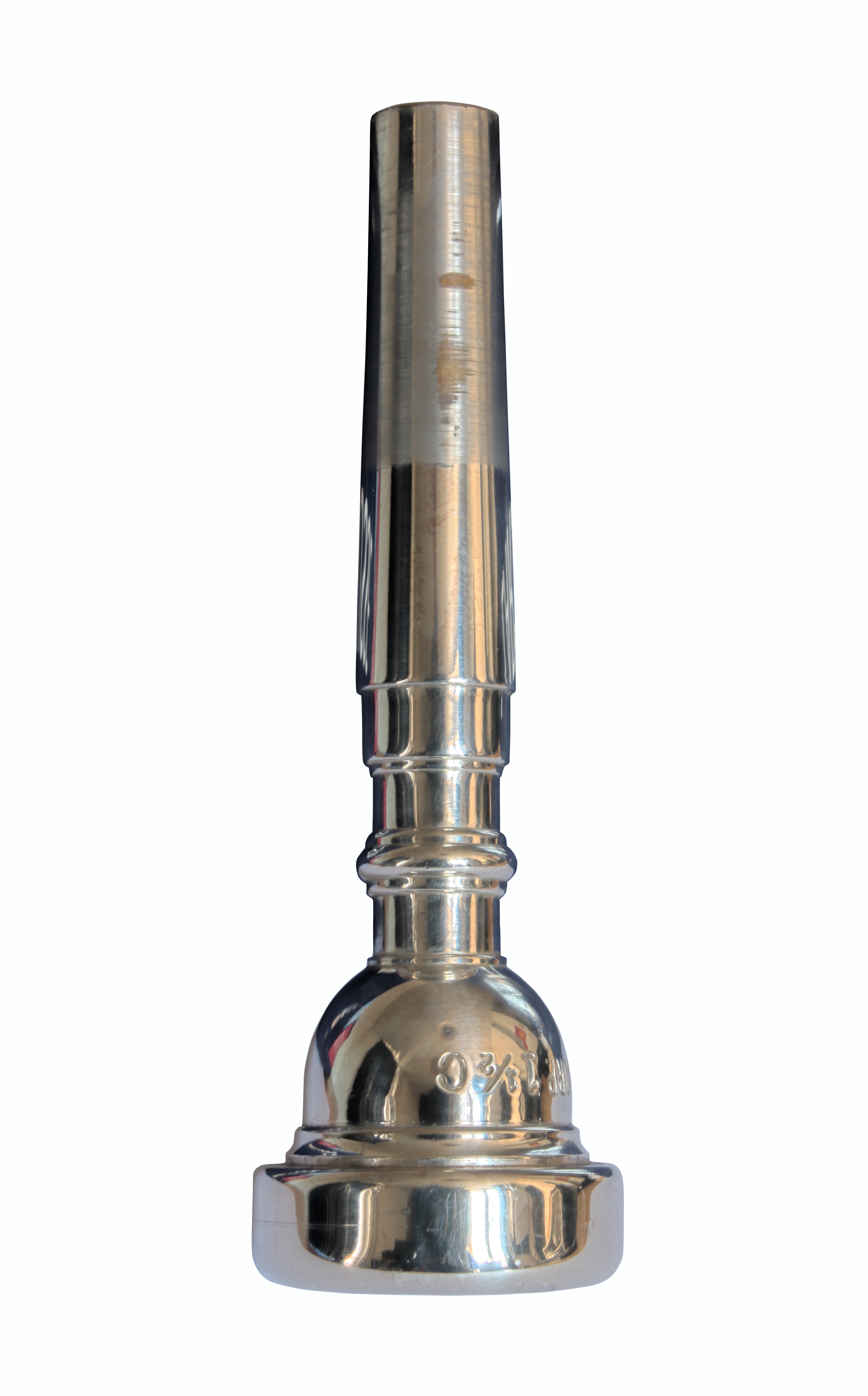
Trumpet mouthpiece from the side

The mouthpiece on brass instruments is the part of the instrument placed on the player's lips. The mouthpiece is a circular opening enclosed by a rim and leads to the instrument via a semi-spherical or conical cavity called the cup. From the cup, a smaller opening (the throat) leads into a tapered cylindrical passage called the backbore. The backbore is housed in a tapered shank, which is inserted into an opening called the receiver on the main body of the instrument.

On all brass instruments, sound is produced when the player's vibrating lips (embouchure) cause the air column, i.e. the air enclosed inside the instrument, to vibrate. This is done by pressing the lips together and blowing air through them in order to produce a 'buzz.' The mouthpiece is where this lip vibration takes place. On most instruments, the mouthpiece can be detached from the main instrument in order to facilitate putting the instrument in its case, to use different mouthpieces with the same instrument, or to 'play' the mouthpiece by itself to exercise the player's embouchure.

Different mouthpieces will produce different qualities of tone when used with the same instrument. Lower instruments also have larger mouthpieces, to maximize resonance (see pitch of brass instruments). Also, mouthpieces are selected to suit the embouchure of the player, to produce a certain timbre, or to optimize the instrument for certain playing styles. For example, trumpet and trombone mouthpieces are usually semi-spherical whereas French horn mouthpieces are conical.

== Mouthpiece design ==
Cut-away view of trumpet mouthpiece: 1. Inner rim diameter; 2. Rim width; 3. Rim contour; 4. Rim Edge; 5. Cup; 6. Throat; 7. Backbore; 8. Shank

The mouthpiece has a large effect on instrument sound. Major effects are due to the shape of the cup, shape of the backbore, and the inner rim diameter. In addition, players often choose a mouthpiece that complements their playing style. In general, brass players who concentrate on the upper range prefer a mouthpiece with a smaller inner rim diameter, and players who emphasize the lower range prefer a larger one. The cup depth also heavily influences the tone of the brass instrument. A shallow cup may "brighten" the sound, meaning that upper overtones are brought out more, while a deep cup can "darken" the sound, emphasizing lower overtones. However, these results will vary from player to player, depending on many personal factors.

The effects of different aspects of mouthpiece design
No.	Mouthpiece element	Effect on playing	Typical size/nature (Trumpet)	Typical size/nature (Tuba)
1.	Inner rim diameter	Larger inner rim diameters are optimized for lower ranges, giving a richer tone. Smaller diameters assist high range playing.	16 mm (0.63 in)	32 mm (1.3 in)
2.	Rim width	Wider rim widths reduce the pressure on the lips, allowing greater stamina. It does, however, reduce flexibility.	5, 6 or 7 mm (0.20, 0.24 or 0.28 in)	6 mm (0.24 in)
3.	Rim contour	Flatter rim contours tend to appear on rims with sharper edges (see below).	Varied	Varied
4.	Rim edge (or bite)	Sharper rim edges reduce stamina but increase control. More smoothed rims are commonly found on deeper cups.	Varied	varied
5.	Cup depth	Shallower cups greatly assist playing in high ranges but do so at the cost of fullness of tone. Deeper cups assist low range flexibility and rich tone.	Around half the inner rim diameter.	3/4 to 2 times the inner rim diameter.
5.	Cup shape	Semi-spherical cups have brighter, more projected tones, while conical cups have less tone definition (see throat contour, below).	Semi-spherical	Both
6.	Throat contour	In semi-spherical cups, a sharper throat contour gives a more harsh, projected tone and a rounded contour gives a deeper, richer tone. Conical cups with a smooth throat have less definition.	Relatively sharp	Usually rounded
6.	Throat diameter	Larger throat diameters give more volume but less control. Smaller diameters have much more control but significant volume limitations.	3.6 mm (0.14 in)	7.6 mm (0.30 in)
7.	Backbore	More conical backbores give a richer tone, while more cylindrical ones give a brighter, more projected tone.	Fairly cylindrical	Varied
	Note: in this table: "flexibility" refers to the 'agility' possibility; greater flexibility assists in playing music with fast passages and large intervals.; "control" refers to the ease of control over harmonic and tone.; "rich tone" refers to notes possessing few high harmonics, while "bright tone" refers to notes possessing many high harmonics.			

== Material ==
Makers commonly construct mouthpieces from one of two types of material, with different costs, properties, and features. Metal mouthpieces can be plated with some other metal. Some of the following assertions, especially those regarding the effect of plating on tone color, are questioned by many players and specialists.

=== Brass ===
Mouthpieces have traditionally been formed of solid brass. Due to brass often containing lead and being toxic upon contact, brass mouthpieces are usually plated with either gold or silver to protect the player from potential brass poisoning.

=== Plastic ===
Plastic mouthpieces are usually made of Lexan plastic, and are often available in various colors. They are durable and don't dent as do metal mouthpieces. Less expensive than metal mouthpieces, players commonly use them when playing outdoors—particularly marching brass players—because their heat conductivity is far less than in a metal mouthpiece. Players who prefer metal mouthpieces generally believe plastic mouthpieces have an inferior tone quality and feel compared to metal.

=== Other ===
Recent additions to the mouthpiece world include stainless steel, titanium, and wood. They are relatively rare, produced by few manufacturers. Some players feel stainless steel and titanium mouthpieces provide advantages over the classic brass mouthpiece, including, anecdotally, a more centered feel and sound, as stainless steel and titanium do not absorb as many vibrations as brass, they require much less care, etc.—but they are much more expensive. (Titanium mouthpieces cost up to US$400 each.)

=== Silver plating ===
Silver plating is common on all brass mouthpieces because it is cost-effective and good in terms of tone quality. It is also moderately germicidal. Silver plating is not as comfortable or as expensive as gold, but has properties and qualities that some feel facilitate certain styles of playing. Some believe that silver plate provides a clearer, darker sound than gold and is good for styles of playing that require clarity and projection. Silver-plate is less expensive than gold, but requires more maintenance because it tarnishes easily. Slightly tarnished silver-plate can be polished back to its brightness with silver polish.

=== Gold plating ===
Some players believe gold-plated mouthpieces on brass instruments create a fuller, richer tone that can also be somewhat darker timbre. For people allergic to the nickel found in most silver, this is the best (but not cheapest) way to play a brass instrument without discomfort. Gold does not tarnish, and subsequently requires little maintenance apart from regular washing with soap and water. The extreme price of gold, however, means that the plating is usually relatively thin and thus fragile, and can even be worn away with use.

== Sizes ==
Each mouthpiece company uses a different labeling system. A larger number can mean a larger or smaller mouthpiece depending on the company. Likewise, the letters mean different things depending on the company. Even if companies appear to share marking systems it may be that same-marked mouthpieces from different manufacturers are different, although usually the differences are relatively small. There is no universally-recognized industry standard.

== See also ==
- Leadpipe
- Brass instrument
- Embouchure
- Gold plating
- Silver
