= Martin Band Instrument Company =

Musical instrument manufacturer in Elkhart, Indiana, US

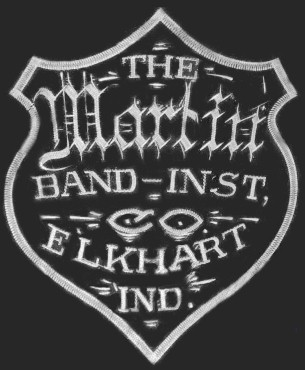
- Type: Private
- Industry: Musical instruments
- Founded: 1905
- Founder: Henry Charles Martin
- Defunct: 2007
- Headquarters: Elkhart, Indiana
- Area served: United States
- Products: Band instruments
- Owner: Unused trademark of a publicly traded conglomerate
- Parent: Steinway Musical Instruments, Conn-Selmer division, Leblanc company

The Martin Band Instrument Company was a musical instrument manufacturer in Elkhart, Indiana. The firm produced band instruments, including trumpets, cornets, fluegelhorns, trombones, and saxophones from 1908 through the 1960s. The brand was acquired by the Leblanc Corporation in 1971 and discontinued in 2007 after Leblanc's 2004 acquisition by Conn-Selmer.

== History ==
=== John Henry Martin and the first Martin company ===
John Henry (Johann Heinrich) Martin was born February 24, 1835, in Dresden, Germany. He learned to make instruments in the old way as an apprentice to the instrument maker Christian Hammig of Markneukirchen, Germany, from 1850 to 1854, according to the archives of Musikinstrumenten-Museum. In 1855 he emigrated to the United States and followed his trade, first in New York by establishing "The Martin Company" then during the later part of 1865 in Chicago. It is believed that Martin was the first maker of musical instruments in Chicago. In 1871 the original Martin factory was destroyed by the Great Chicago Fire. The family lost everything and was reunited three days after the fire when they met on the shores of Lake Michigan. In 1876 the family moved to Elkhart, Indiana, where John Henry became an employee of C.G. Conn. During this period his employment was sporadic and he worked for other instrument manufacturers. Some of these companies were The Michigan Musical Manufacturing Company of Detroit, Michigan and the early York Band Instrument Company in Grand Rapids, Michigan. Because of ill health, he retired from making instruments in 1902 and died on November 25, 1910.

=== Henry Charles Martin and the Martin Band Instrument Company ===
The eldest son of John Henry Martin was Henry Charles Martin (b. New York City, 12 January 1866; d. Elkhart, 8 November 1927). From about 1890 he worked for Conn as his father had done. Martin family sources claim that the Martin Band Instrument Company began in 1905. It may have been setting up at this date with very limited production, however it wasn't until 1910 that the company was in full operation with Henry Charles Martin, Robert J. Martin, Charles E. Martin and Frederick Martin as president, vice-president, secretary and treasurer respectively. Family sources indicate that the four brothers fought incessantly over the company, and in 1912 Francis Compton bought a major share and assumed the position as vice-president from 1912 to 1917. Charles Henry Martin remained as president until 1917. In 1922 he was working for Buescher. It is known in a letter dated 1923 that Martin expressed his desire to begin tooling for a third Martin company, but in 1924 he suffered the first of three strokes and was forced to resign from Buescher.

=== The company from 1912 to 1971 ===
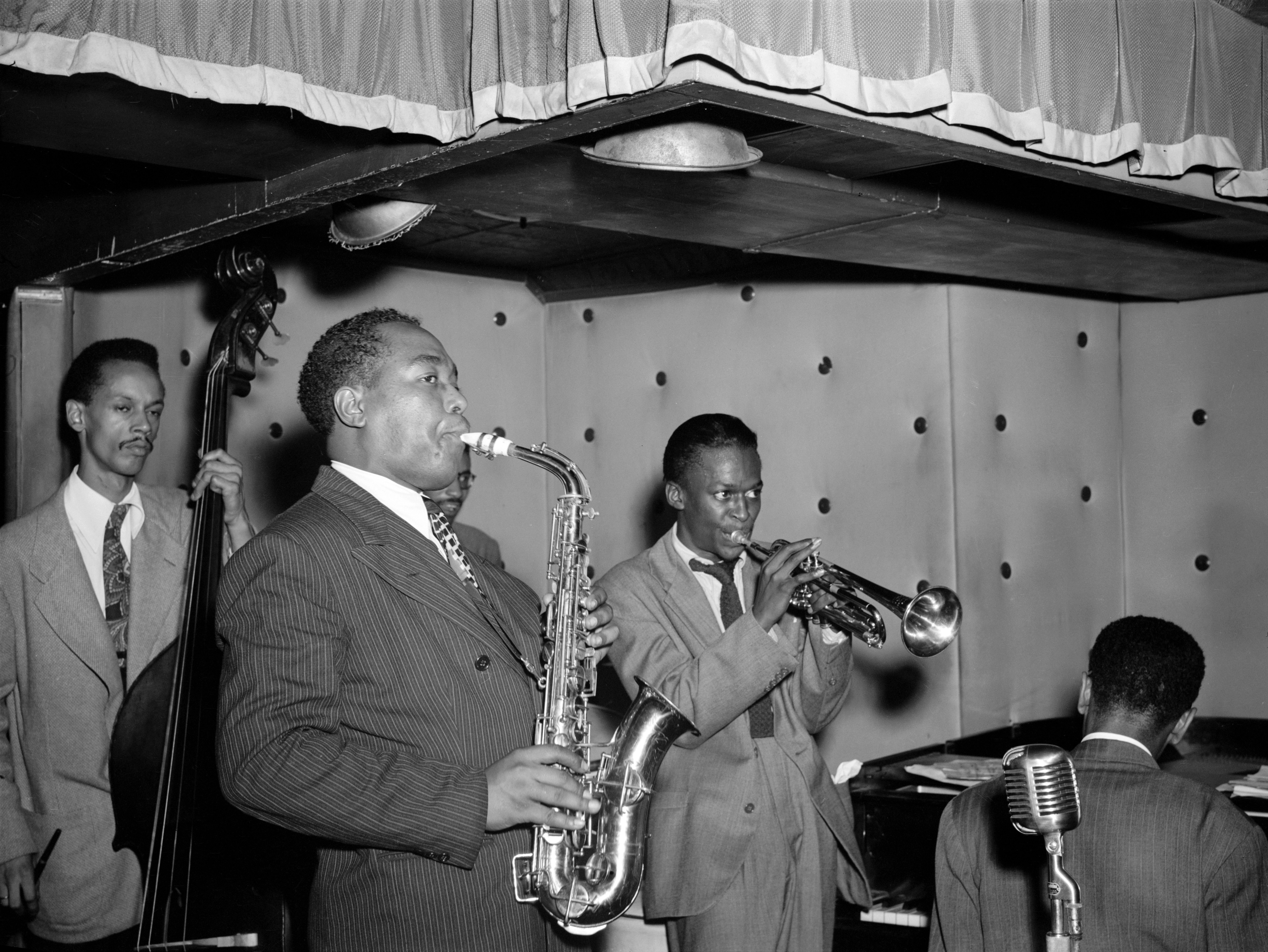
Charlie Parker playing a 1920s Martin 'Handcraft' alto saxophone with Miles Davis in 1947

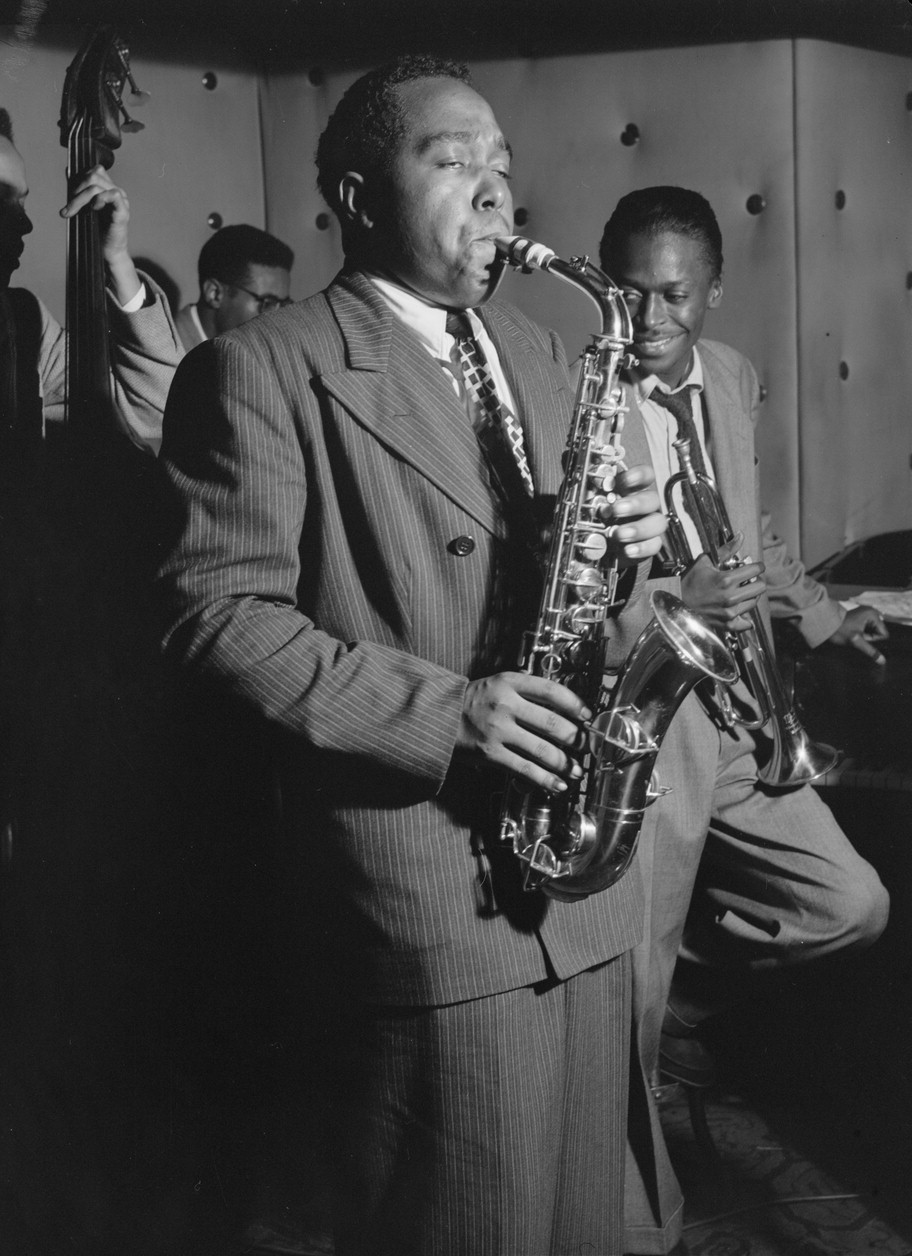
Another photo of Charlie Parker playing a 1920s Martin 'Handcraft' alto saxophone

From 1912 into the 1920s production expanded rapidly to include a full line of brasswinds and saxophones for the professional and amateur markets. The trademark name "Martin Handcraft" acquired modifiers designating specific models such as "Master," "Troubador," "Imperial," "Committee," and "Standard," with "Standard" designating second-line instruments sold under Martin's name prior to 1942. The mid-1930s saw introduction of the "Martin Committee" model trumpets and "Martin Handcraft Committee" saxophones. Production was very limited during World War II and the Korean War, however Martin was able to survive as a company thanks to their limited production and strong reputation. The "Handcraft Committee" name for saxophones was dropped in 1945. Martin's postwar "Committee III" saxophones were branded "The Martin (saxophone type)" without the "Handcraft," although the "Committee" name for saxophones was officially revived during the late 1950s. Martin also produced limited edition and commemorative versions of their saxophones with names such as "Centennial' and "Music Man" and, from 1956 on, a deluxe version called the "Magna." Martin saxophones were distinctive for having tonehole chimneys soldered onto the body decades after other manufacturers switched to drawing them out of the body tube to save production costs.

Martin was also a major source of "stencil" instruments sold under various merchandisers' brands, and created the Indiana Band Instrument Company in 1928 as a paper entity to distribute its second-line products sold under those brands. That entity was officially dissolved by 1942. "The Indiana by Martin" designated second-line instruments from 1942 until the early 1960s, followed by "Medalist" and "Imperial" (not to be confused with Handcraft Imperial). The Indiana by Martin line continued the serial sequence of the old IBIC rather than the main Martin sequence, which sometimes leads to confusion regarding the ages of Indiana by Martin instruments. Some of the stencil instruments such as the postwar "Dick Stabile" and "Olds Super" saxophones were professional grade.

In 1961 Paul E. Richards combined Martin, E. K. Blessing, and F.A. Reynolds under the "Roundtable of Music Craftsmen," or RMC. Richards desired increased production for the student market. Key personnel left the company and the arrangement fell apart in 1964. The rights to the Martin trademark were taken over by Wurlitzer, and the Martin factory became a division of Wurlitzer in Elkhart. Wurlitzer eventually discontinued production of saxophones and sold low-quality saxophones made by Malerne as "The Martin". In 1971 the rights to the Martin name were bought by Leblanc, and Wurlitzer closed the old Martin factory.

=== 1971-2007 ===
Leblanc was an early importer of Yanagisawa saxophones and sold some of those instruments as "The Martin" before marketing them under the producer's own name. Leblanc produced Martin-branded brasswinds at their Holton factory in Elkhorn, Wisconsin. Leblanc used the "Committee" brand for an Elkhorn-produced trumpet although it was in fact based on a Holton design. Use of Martin's "Committee" name for trumpets and "Urbie Green" name for trombones continued until 2007.

The Leblanc Company was bought by the Conn-Selmer Corporation in 2004. The Martin brand was discontinued when Leblanc's Elkhorn facility was closed in 2007.

== Committee brand ==
Martin Committee was the trademark name of the Martin Band Instrument Company's premier lines of trumpets, trombones and saxophones starting in the mid-1930s. All were produced in Elkhart, Indiana. The Martin Committee trumpets and saxophones were favorites of jazz musicians. Committee trombones were introduced in 1939. Committee model saxophones were discontinued towards the end of the 1960s. Committee model trumpets were discontinued in 1971, although the brand was nominally continued and applied to a different design.

=== Trumpet ===
The Martin Committee trumpet was originally designed in the late 1930s by the legendary Renold Schilke with play testing and feedback by a "committee" of diverse players and teachers. Schilke always maintained that the horn was actually designed "by a committee of one."

The first advertisement for the Martin Committee ran in the December 1, 1940 issue of Down Beat. It listed the committee as follows:

- Fred Berman, popular radio staff star, probably the busiest trumpet player and teacher in Boston.
- Bunny Berigan, soloist and band leader
- M. Thomas Cousins, of the National Symphony Orchestra
- Dana Garrett, formerly cornet soloist of the Sousa Band - now first trumpet, Capitol Theatre, Washington, D.C.
- Rafael Mendez, Hollywood artist
- Jimmy Neilson, Band Director and Instrumental Instructor, Oklahoma City University - an outstanding trumpet and cornet artist.
- Renold Schilke, one of the most highly skilled artists in America, first trumpet with the Chicago Symphony Orchestra.
- Otto Kurt Schmeisser, formerly with the Boston and Detroit Symphony Orchestras, later a successful teacher in Detroit.
- Charlie Spivak, rated "tops" by everybody who knows - now heading his own fine combination.
- Charlie Teagarden, soloist and brother of bandleader Jack Teagarden

The input of the committee was taken into consideration during the Committee trumpet's design process.

The horn became widely adopted in jazz music because of its warm, rich sound and flexible intonation. It has a unique sound that has been described as "dark and smokey".

Miles Davis played custom-made Committees throughout his career. Other notable players include Dizzy Gillespie, Clark Terry, Chet Baker, Lee Morgan, Maynard Ferguson, Art Farmer, Wallace Roney, and Chris Botti.

When the rights to the Martin brand were purchased by Leblanc in 1971, the Committee designs were discontinued and the name given to trumpets of a different design produced at a Leblanc's Holton facility in Elkhorn, Wisconsin. These horns were produced until 2007, when the Martin brand was dropped by Conn-Selmer, who had purchased Leblanc in 2004.

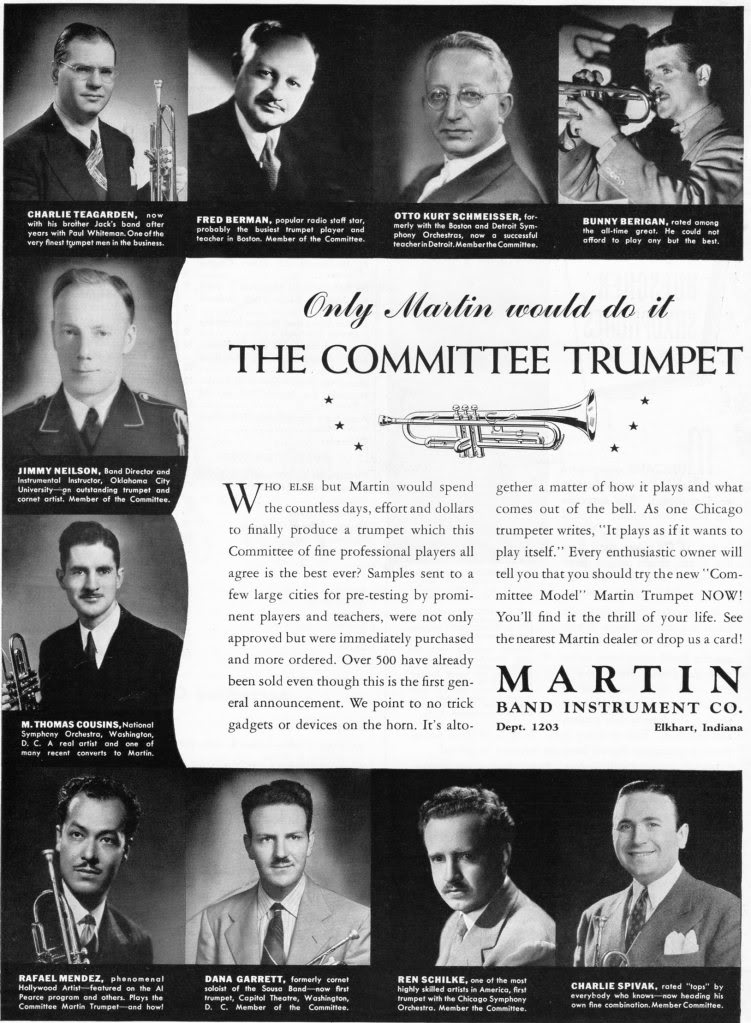
Members of the Martin committee

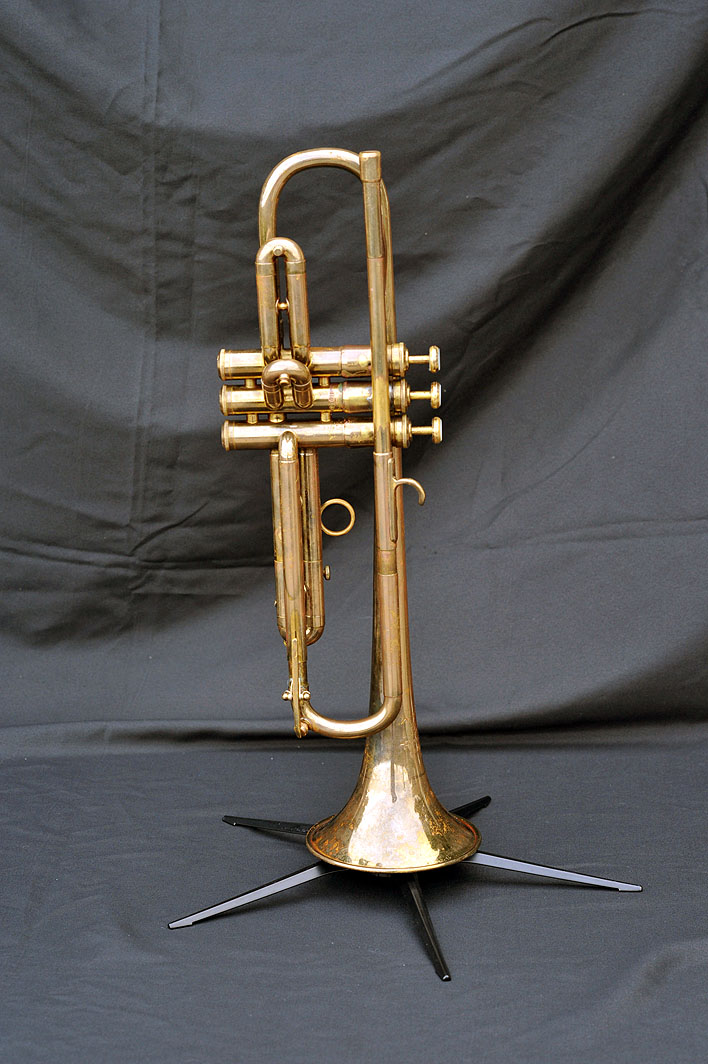
1954 Martin Committee trumpet in unrestored condition

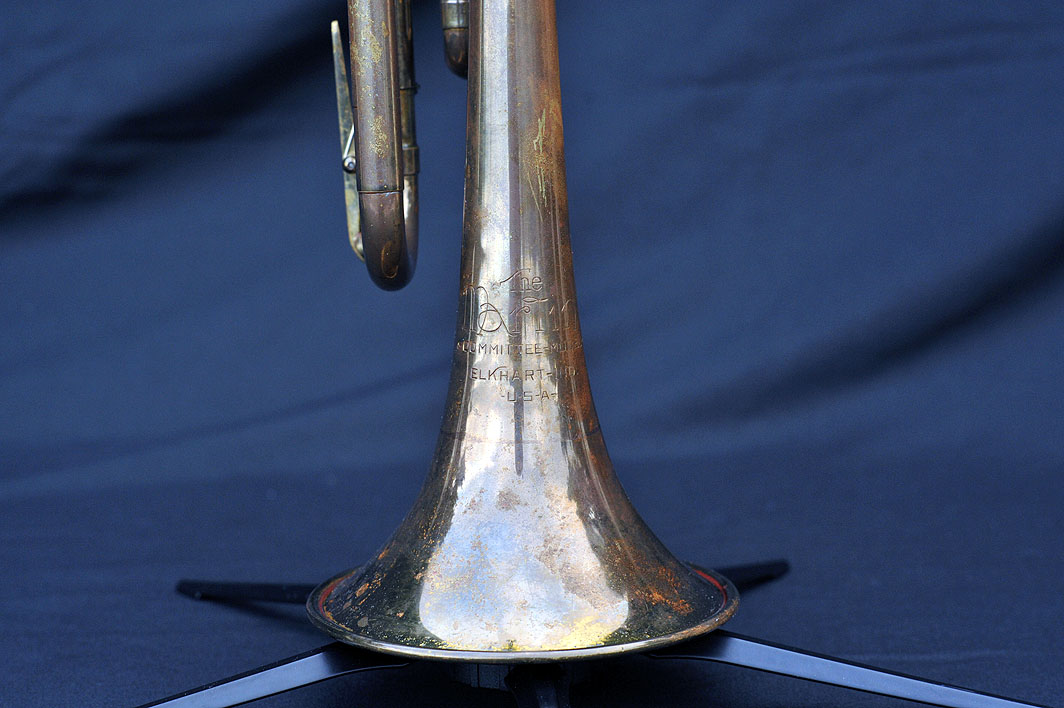
Martin Committee bell engraving

=== Saxophone ===
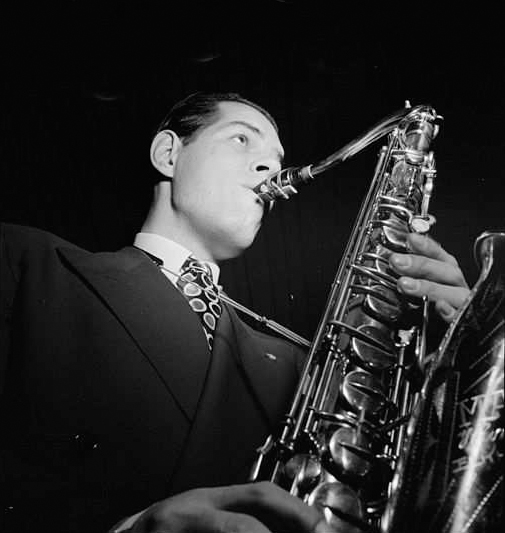
Tex Beneke with a Martin handcraft tenor saxophone (1947)

A new model of Martin saxophone named Handcraft Committee was introduced in 1936, replacing the Handcraft Imperial model. This series, often referred to as "Committee I" today, has art-deco engraving depicting an urban skyline with searchlights sweeping the sky as an airplane flies through. These are informally called "Martin skyline" and "Martin searchlight" horns.

In 1939 Martin introduced a new design named Handcraft Committee II, with a larger bell and a deeper sound, sometimes called "Lion and Crown" after the new engraving design. The "Handcraft" name was still engraved, but not "Committee"; "Comm. II" was stamped on the rear of the body tube.

In 1945 Martin introduced a new model that gained favor among R&B and rock & roll players for its dynamic sound properties. The "Handcraft" name was dropped and the horns were branded "The Martin (saxophone type);" the "Committee" name was engraved on some examples from the late 1950s on. Other variations in engraving include the "RMC" initials on horns produced from 1961 to 1964. It is sometimes called "Committee III" today to disambiguate it from other Martin saxophones.

Production of the "Committee III" model continued until the late 1960s, when Wurlitzer discontinued saxophone production at the Martin factory and began using "The Martin" as the name for student model instruments manufactured by Malerne. After the acquisition of the Martin brand rights by Leblanc in 1971, the name was applied to Yanagisawa saxophones imported by Leblanc. Neither the Malerne or Yanagisawa instruments branded "The Martin" are related to the Committee III design that preceded them.

=== Trombone ===
Martin introduced the Committee trombone in 1939. The committee that designed it, chaired by Chuck Campbell, also consisted of Miff Mole, Jack Jenney, Al Angelotta, Andy Russo, Al Philburn, Phil Giardina, Lloyd Turner, and Charlie Butterfield. It was available in medium bore with a 7-inch (18 cm) bell and medium large bore with a 7 1/2-inch (19 cm) bell. A "De Luxe" model was later added featuring nickel silver trim.

== See also ==
- C.G. Conn
- Conn-Selmer
- York Band Instrument Company
- Leblanc (musical instrument manufacturer)
- Buescher Band Instrument Company
- Steinway Musical Instruments

== Sources ==
- McMakin, Dean "Musical Instrument Manufacturing in Elkhart, Indiana" (unpublished typescript, 1987, available at Elkhart Public Library)
- Elkhart city directories (available Elkhart Public Library)
- The Elkhart Truth, Saturday 26 November 1910, obituary of John Henry Martin
- Elkhart Daily Review, Saturday 26 November 1910, obituary of John Henry Martin
- The Elkhart Truth, Tuesday 8 November 1927, obituary of Henry Charles Martin
- TheMartinStory.net
