= Pascucci =

Pascucci may refer to:

- Pascucci (surname)
- Caffè Pascucci
