= Bublitz Case Company =

- Type: Private
- Industry: Musical instrument manufacturing
- Founded: 1945
- Founder: William Frank "Bill" Bublitz
- Defunct: 1966
- Fate: Assets acquired by G. Leblanc Corporation
- Headquarters: Elkhorn, Wisconsin, U.S.
- Key people: Robert Ernest "Bob" Bublitz (general manager); Gustave Julius William "Gus" Bublitz (president)
- Products: Musical instrument cases (clarinets, oboes, bassoons, flutes, piccolos, trumpets, cornets, saxophones, trombones, French horns, baritones, tubas); case for television test instrumentation
- Owner: G. Leblanc Corporation (from 1966)
- Number of employees: ~15–25

The Bublitz Case Company was a manufacturer of musical instrument cases in Elkhorn, Wisconsin. Assets of the Bublitz Case Company were bought by G. Leblanc Corporation, a manufacturer of musical instruments in Kenosha, Wisconsin.

The Bublitz Case Company manufactured over a hundred models of cases for clarinets, oboes, bassoons, flutes, piccolos, trumpets, cornets, saxophones, trombones, French horns, baritones, tubas and a case for television test instrumentation. In 1948 the company produced eighteen thousand cases. During the nineteen fifties and sixties Bublitz manufactured over twenty-five thousand cases annually.

== Early beginnings ==
William Frank "Bill" Bublitz (4 May 1900 - 3 July 1962), Elkhorn, Wisconsin, son of a nearby farmer began making violins in 1912 when he was only twelve years old. July 9, 1921 the violin maker filed for a patent on his newly invented “Cramping Form for Violin Bouts" and received a patent on May 9, 1922. "A general line of musical instruments was announced by William F. Bublitz, who opened this week (February 17, 1923) in Elkhorn, Wis."

“The Wisconsin inventor initially specialized in making violins especially adapted for juveniles. These violins were about three-quarters the regular size which were particularly suited for a boy or girl who found it difficult to handle adult violins. Mr. Bublitz inherited his love for music from his grandfather, Carl Bublitz. The latter was a violinist in Leipzig, Germany. The younger Bublitz was skilled as a violinist, but modestly said that his knowledge was acquired to enable him to better perfect the instruments that he makes." Although the business was originally located in Elkhorn, later it moved to Burlington until a fire destroyed the business.

== Founding ==
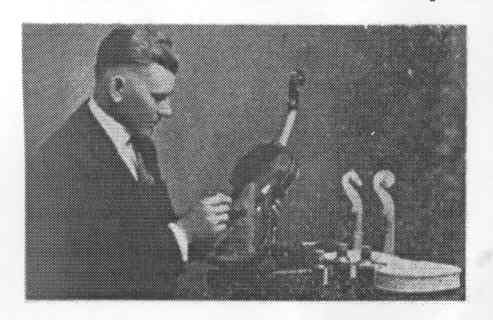
William Frank Bublitz, Violinmaker, 1922

William Frank “Bill” Bublitz then founded the case company after making violins as a young skilled wood carver and teaching students to play the violins in nearby Burlington, Wisconsin. A few of his violins still exists today. After his business burned down, Bill began work in the case department of the Frank Holton Company. Later he managed the Elkhorn Case Company until he began his own case manufacturing business. Two men and three women were employed in Bill's factory when he closed the business to enter military service during World War II. After his discharge from the Army in 1945, Bill resumed his manufacturing business. In 1947, Bill's brother, Robert Earnest “Bob” Bublitz (24 November 1916 - 30 November 1973) who prior to the war, managed the plating department at the Frank Holton Company, joined Bill. The Bublitz Case Company was initially located in the rear of a garage behind Bill's mother, Tina's home at 209 West Page Street.

== Expansion ==
As the business grew, the factory was expanded three time over adjacent lots behind Bill's and his brother Bob's homes. The business usually employed between fifteen and twenty-five employees. The cases were sold all over the United States and in Europe. The primary customers were musical instrument manufacturers like Leblanc (musical instrument manufacturer), W.T. Armstrong Company, Getzen, Allied, Gemeinhardt and Buffet. Additionally, the cases were sold to large wholesalers and jobbers as well as a TV test instrument manufacturer.

== Personnel ==
Bill was the general manager and in-charge of the wood shop, lining and packing department. Bob managed the covering and hardware installation departments. Both Bill and Bob worked alongside their employees in every phase of the work. Bill made most of the specialized machinery and molds for manufacturing the cases. He also designed and constructed the forms from which trombone, French-horn, baritone, trumpet and cornet cases were molded from layers of basswood veneer.

== Design and materials ==
Basswood was used for the side frames and the tops and bottoms were made from either luan mahogany, birch or molded basswood. The cases were usually covered with a black leatherette and the insides were lined with a blue or red plush. The collegiate models of clarinets, trumpets, cornets and saxophones cases were sewn with a leather binding and metal corner protectors were riveted in place for durability. French-horn, trombone, tube and baritone cases had a steel banding installed on the top to make the case rugged and prevent sheet music from falling out of the case. Quality craftsmanship was always a concern with Bill &/or Bob who personally inspecting every case that left the factory. The factory was one of the first factories in Southeastern Wisconsin to be completely air conditioned.

== Leadership changes ==
Following Bill's death in 1962, Robert Bublitz became the general manager and was joined by another brother, Gustave Julius William “Gus” Bublitz (22 June 1906 - 5 July 1976) who worked in Holton's trombone department. Bob and Gus purchased the shares in the company inherited by Mrs. William Bublitz. In the incorporation, Gus became the president, Robert Joseph Bublitz, the vice president and Robert Ernest Bublitz the General Manager, Secretary & Treasurer.

== Changes in ownership ==
During the Summer of 1966, due to working capital & inventory shortages brought on by the purchase of Mrs. Bublitz interest, the business was sold to one of its primary historical long term customers, LeBlanc. Two year later the business was moved to the second floor of the Holton Company for better work flow. Bob continued as the general manager of the company until he resigned in 1972. Later the name of the business unit was changed to the Leblanc's Case Division. In 2005 the manufacturing equipment was crated and shipped to China. During the Fall 2008 the Holton factory was closed and the manufacturing equipment was moved to Eastlake, Ohio, home town of The H. N. White Company, manufacturers of the King line of musical instruments. By 2010, many of the companies that made up the musical instrument manufacturing industry including C.G. Conn and Selmer have merged into one musical instrument manufacturing conglomerate, Steinway Musical Instruments, Inc. (NYSE: LVB until taken private in 2013).

Elkhart, Indiana once the capital for musical instrument manufacturing, has gone from over sixty companies in the 1960s to just three companies in 2010. The musical instrument industry has changed drastically because of consolidation, outsourcing of manufacturing offshore to take advantage of lower labor cost, inexpensive imports and reduced school budgets for music.
