= Pescucci =

Pescucci is an Italian surname. Notable people with the surname include:

- Gabriella Pescucci (born 1943), Italian costume designer
- Gastone Pescucci (1926–1999), Italian actor and voice actor

== See also ==
- Pascucci (surname)
