= Contrabass clarinet =

Very low pitched instrument of the clarinet family

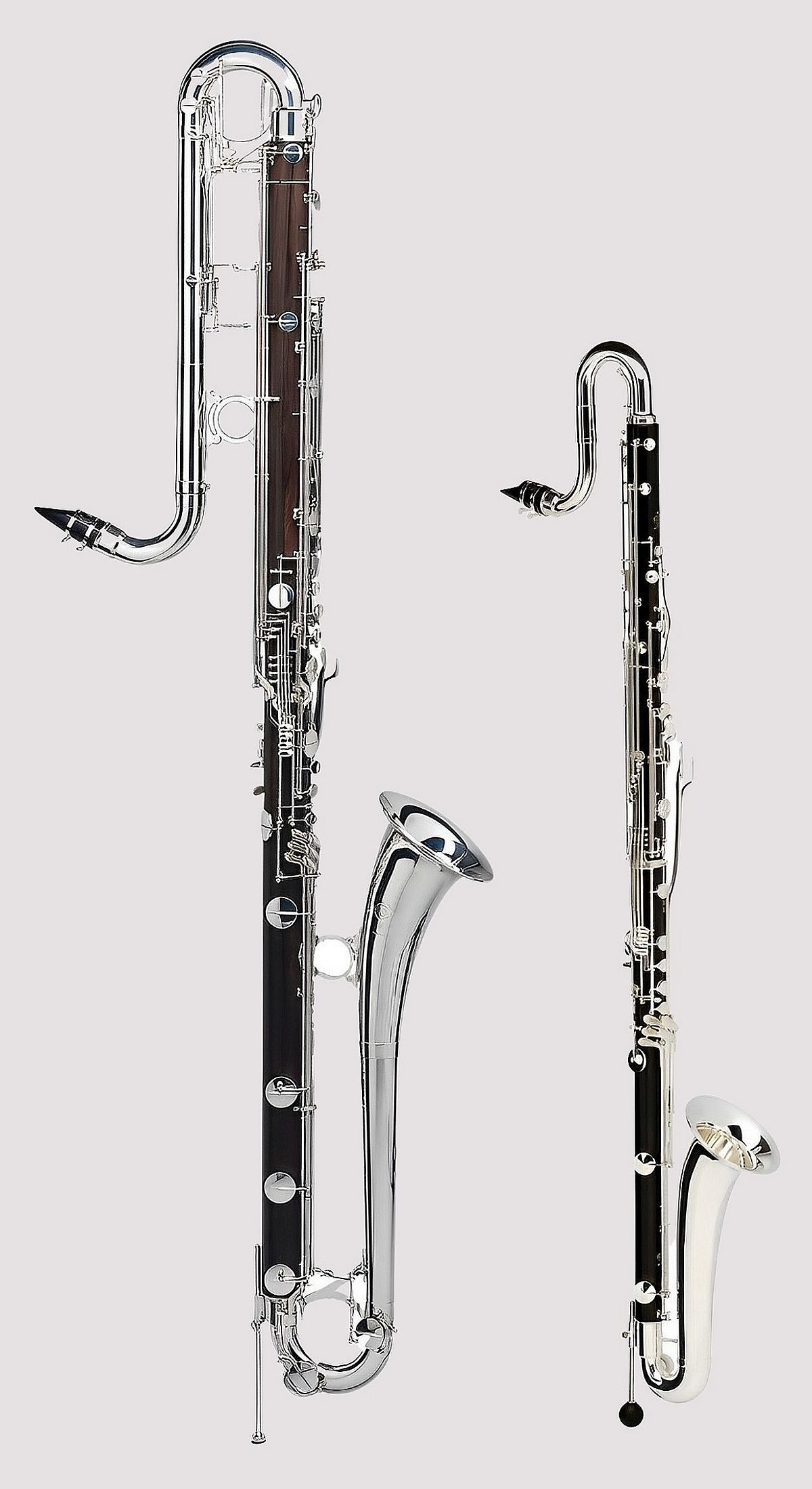
- Clarinets: contrabass in B♭ (left), contra-alto in E♭ (right)

Woodwind instrument
- Classification: Single-reed
- Developed: 1808

Playing range
- The contrabass clarinet in B♭ sounds two octaves and a major second lower than written.

Related instruments
- Contra-alto clarinet; Bass clarinet

Musicians
- List of clarinetists

The contrabass clarinet (or pedal clarinet after the pedals of pipe organs) is an uncommonly used member of the clarinet family. Modern contrabass clarinets are transposing instruments pitched in B♭, sounding two octaves lower than the common B♭ soprano clarinet and one octave below the bass clarinet. Some contrabass clarinet models have extra keys to extend the range down to low written E♭_{3}, D_{3} or C_{3}. This gives a tessitura written range, notated in treble clef, of C_{3} – F_{6}, which sounds B♭_{0} – E♭_{4}. Some early instruments were pitched in C; Arnold Schoenberg's Fünf Orchesterstücke specifies a contrabass clarinet in A, but there is no evidence such an instrument has ever existed.

The smaller E♭ contra-alto clarinet is sometimes referred to as the "E♭ contrabass clarinet" and is pitched one octave lower than the E♭ alto clarinet.

Two models of subcontrabass clarinet (the octocontra-alto and octocontrabass) were built as prototypes by Leblanc in the 1930s and survive in the Leblanc museum.

== History ==
=== Contrabass ===
The earliest known contrabass clarinet was the contre-basse guerrière invented in 1808 by a goldsmith named Dumas of Sommières; little else is known of this instrument. The batyphone (also spelled bathyphone, Ger. and Fr. batyphon) was a contrabass clarinet which was the outcome of W. F. Wieprecht's endeavor to obtain a contrabass for the reed instruments. The batyphone was made to a scale twice the size of the clarinet in C, the divisions of the chromatic scale being arranged according to acoustic principles. For convenience in stopping holes too far apart to be covered by the fingers, crank or swivel keys were used. The instrument was constructed of maple-wood, had a clarinet mouthpiece of suitable size connected by means of a cylindrical brass crook with the upper part of the tube and a brass bell. The pitch was two octaves below the clarinet in C, the compass being the same, and thus corresponding to the modern bass tuba. The tone was pleasant and full, but not powerful enough for the contrabass register in a military band. The batyphone had besides one serious disadvantage: it could be played with facility only in its nearly related keys, G and F major. The batyphone was invented and patented in 1839 by F.W. Wieprecht, director general of all the Prussian military bands, and E. Skorra, the court instrument manufacturer of Berlin. In practice the instrument was found to be of little use, and was superseded by the bass tuba.

A batyphone bearing the name of its inventors formed part of the Snoeck collection which was acquired for Berlin's collection of ancient musical instruments at the Hochschule für Musik. Soon after Wieprecht's invention, Adolphe Sax created his clarinette-bourdon in B♭.

In 1889, Fontaine-Besson began producing a new pedal clarinet. This instrument consists of a tube 10 feet (3.0 m) long, in which cylindrical and conical bores are combined. The tube is doubled up twice upon itself. There are 13 keys and 2 rings on the tube, and the fingering is the same as for the B♭ clarinet except for the eight highest semitones. The tone is rich and full except for the lowest notes, which are unavoidably a little rough in quality, but much more sonorous than the corresponding notes on the contrabassoon. This is an octave lower than a bass clarinet and two octaves lower than a B♭ clarinet. The upper register resembles the chalumeau register of the B♭ clarinet, being reedy and sweet. Besson exhibited a new pedal clarinet in London in 1892. None of these instruments saw widespread use, but they provided a basis for contrabass clarinets made beginning in the late 19th and early 20th centuries by several manufacturers, notably those designed by Charles Houvenaghel for Leblanc, which were more successful.

=== Contra-alto ===
The contra-alto clarinet is higher-pitched than the contrabass and is pitched in the key of E♭ rather than B♭. The unhyphenated form "contra alto clarinet" is also sometimes used, as is "contralto clarinet", but the latter is confusing since the instrument's range is much lower than the contralto vocal range; the more correct term "contra-alto" is meant to convey, by analogy with "contrabass", that the instrument plays an octave lower than the alto clarinet. It is also referred to as the E♭ contrabass clarinet. It is the second-largest member of the clarinet family in regular use, larger than the more common bass clarinet but not as large as the B♭ contrabass clarinet.

Like other clarinets, the contra-alto clarinet is a wind instrument that uses a reed to produce sound. The keys of the contra-alto are similar to the keys on smaller clarinets, and are played in the same way. Some contra-alto clarinet models have a range extending down to low (written) E♭, sounding as the lowest G♭ on the piano (aka G♭_{1}), while others can play down to low (written) C, sounding E♭_{1}. Foag Klarinetten in Germany make a contra-alto clarinet using additional thumb keys similar to a bassoon to extend the range down to a written low A, sounding C_{1}.

The earliest contra-alto clarinets were developed in the first half of the nineteenth century; these were usually pitched in F and were called contrabasset horns, being an octave lower than the basset horn. Albert (probably E. J. Albert, son of Eugène Albert) built an instrument in F around 1890. In the late 19th and early 20th century contra-alto clarinets in E♭ finally attained some degree of popularity.

The contra-alto clarinet is used mostly in concert bands and clarinet choirs, where it usually, though not always, plays the bass line of a piece of music. While there are few parts written specifically for it, the contra-alto can play the baritone saxophone part and sounds the same pitch; it is also possible to read parts written in the bass clef for instruments pitched in C (such as bassoon or tuba) as if the part were in the treble clef, while adjusting the key signature and any accidentals as necessary by adding three sharps to the music. It is occasionally used in jazz, and a few solo pieces have been written for it. The contra-alto clarinet is also used in a few Broadway pit orchestras, with its parts being written in reed books as a doubled instrument (e.g. with soprano clarinet and bass clarinet).

=== Subcontrabass (octocontra-alto, octocontrabass) ===
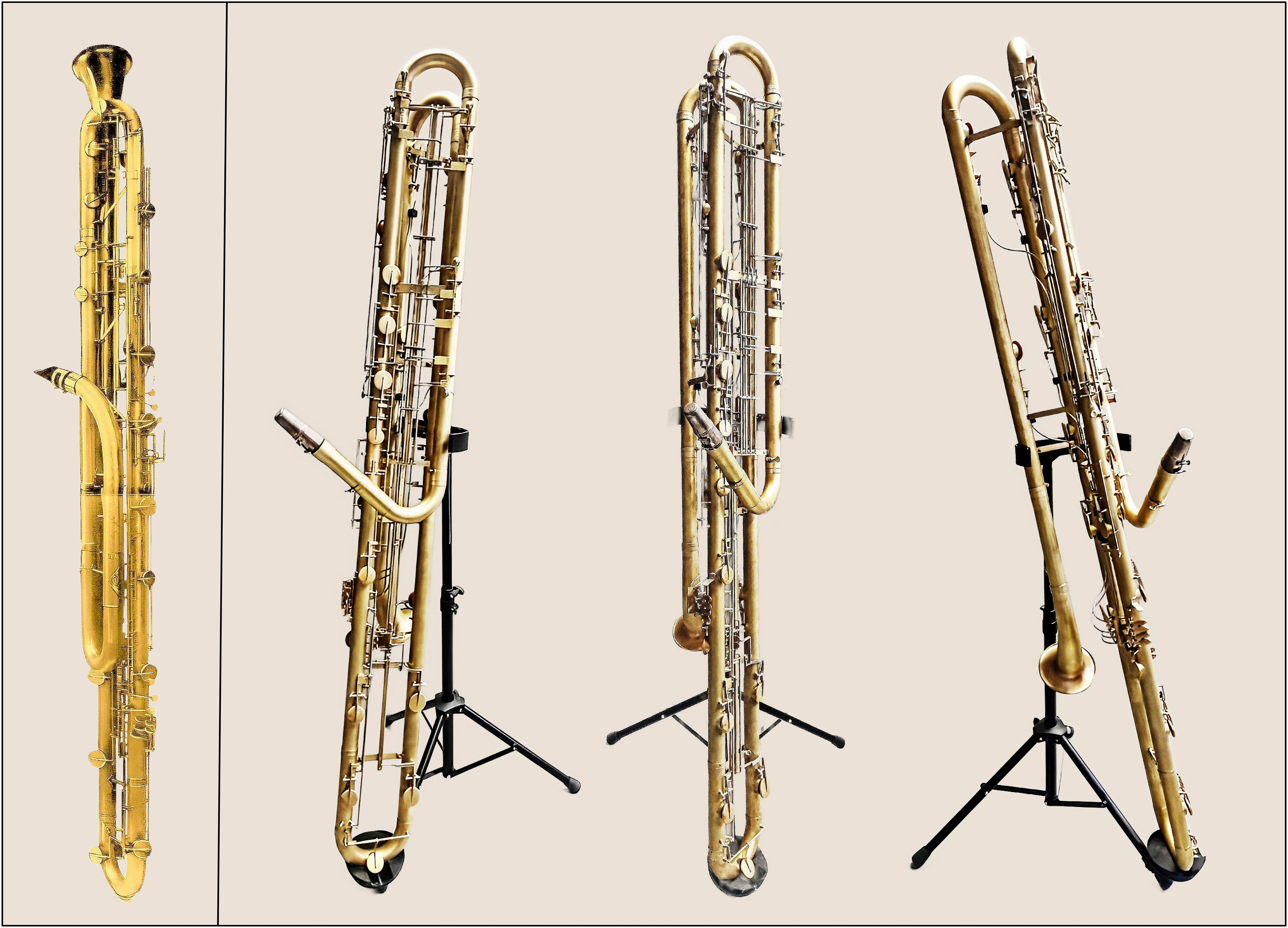
Subcontrabass clarinets by Leblanc 1939 and Foag 2025

In 1935, Belgian instrument maker Charles Houvenaghel at Leblanc built a single prototype octocontrabass clarinet in B♭ a full octave below the contrabass and standing 8 foot 2 inches (2.49 m) high. It was exhibited at the World's Fair that year. Its lowest note, C_{0} (written D_{3}), is the lowest note on a 32′ pedal organ stop. This instrument survives in non-playable condition in the Leblanc collection of the Musée des Instruments à vent in La Couture-Boussey, France. Houvenaghel also built two slightly smaller prototype octocontra-alto clarinets in E♭ for Leblanc in the 1930s, pitched a fifth below the B♭ contrabass and one octave below the E♭ contra-alto clarinet. Only one was ever finished with key work, in 1971 to low C (sounding E♭_{0}). That year, Leblanc announced its "retail price" as $3700 USD (equivalent to $29,000 in 2025), though none were apparently sold. This instrument is also on permanent exhibit at the museum, donated in 2011 by Leblanc president Leon Pascucci and restored to playable condition by French clarinettist and technician Cyrille Mercadier.

Although these enormous "octo" clarinets are mentioned in some texts (e.g. Baines, 1991) neither were manufactured by Leblanc beyond the prototype stage. There are some contemporary efforts to recreate them using modern materials and 3D printing technology. In late 2018, American instrument maker and woodwind technician Jared De Leon began work on prototypes for B♭ octocontrabass and E♭ octocontra-alto clarinets, and in January 2025 demonstrated a working E♭ octocontra-alto clarinet based on a 3D printed design. In April 2025 at the Akustika Nürnberg trade show after five years of development, the German instrument maker Foag Klarinetten presented their first production all-metal B♭ octocontrabass clarinet, with keys to low C (sounding B♭_{−1}).

At least three pieces of music have been written specifically for octocontrabass by Norwegian composer Terje Lerstad (Trisonata, Op. 28; De Profundis, Op. 139; and Mirrors in Ebony for clarinet choir, Op. 144). There are no known recordings of these pieces.

== Manufacturers ==
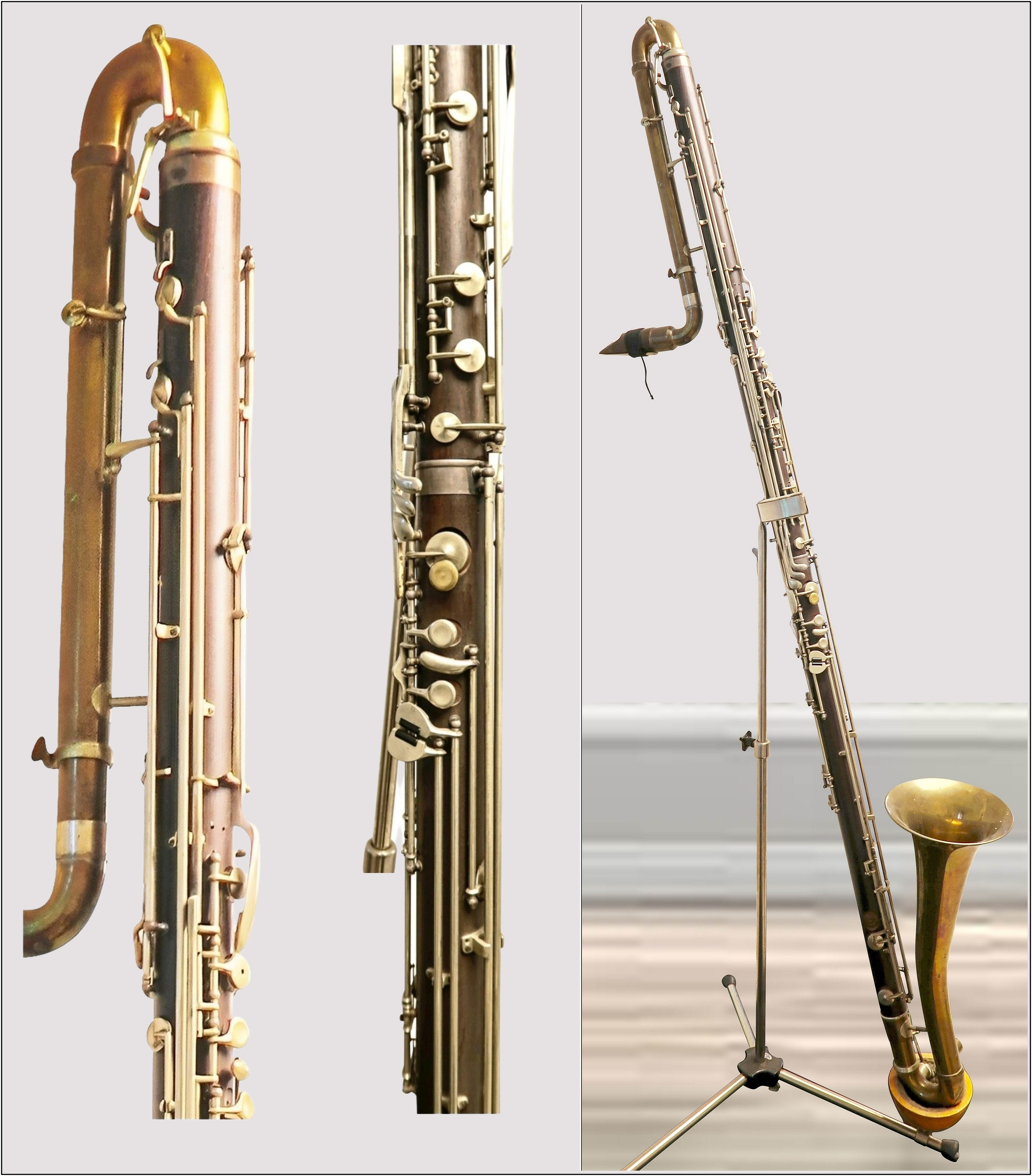
Fritz Wurlitzer German contrabass clarinet (prototype ca. 1975)

France:

- Henri Selmer Paris
  - Contrabass (Model 41) to low C in bass clarinet-shape with rosewood body.
  - Contra-alto (Model 40) to low E♭ in bass clarinet-shape with rosewood body.
- Buffet Crampon makes a contra-alto clarinet, grenadilla body in bass clarinet-shape.

USA:

- Conn-Selmer had one model of each of the two clarinets under its brand Leblanc, but no longer do as of 2026.
  - Contrabass: Leblanc L7182, to low E-flat, ABS body.
  - Contra-alto: Leblanc L7181, to low E-flat, ABS body.

Germany:

- Benedikt Eppelsheim Blasinstrumente produce the metal contrabass clarinet with Boehm or German system fingering.
- Fritz Wurlitzer contrabass clarinet with German system

Italy:

- Ripa Musical Instruments distributes a double bass clarinet made of metal in paperclip form.

China:

- Tianjin Frater Musical Instrument Co. produces a double bass clarinet made of metal in paperclip form.

== Development ==
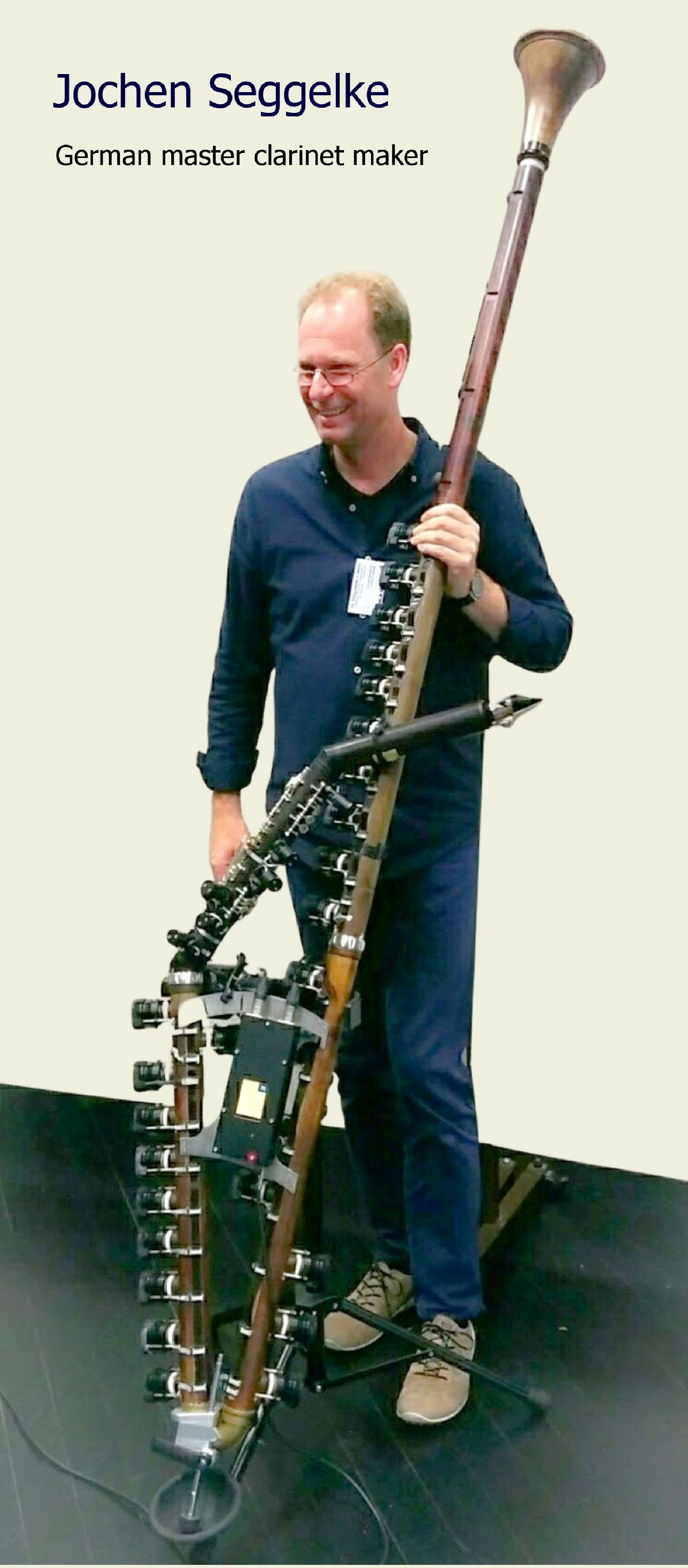
Contrabass Clarinet Extended (CLEX)

Since 2012, a research team led by Ernesto Molinari (professor at the Bern University of the Arts), Jochen Seggelke (clarinet maker) and Daniel Debrunner (mechatronics engineer) has been developing various prototypes of a new double bass clarinet called CLEX' (Contrabass Clarinet Extended) as a mechatronic solution. The motorised keys are remotely controlled by the musician's fingers via keys equipped with electronic sensors. This type of instrument opens up new musical perspectives for instrumentalists and composers. The positioning of the holes on the clarinet body is completely free of traditional mechanical constraints.

In June 2016, Molinari presented the first of three working prototypes at two concert events.

In a video posted in December 2021, Jared De Leon cited the CLEX project as an inspiration for a new theoretical prototype octocontrabass clarinet that would utilize mechatronic keywork.

== Performers ==
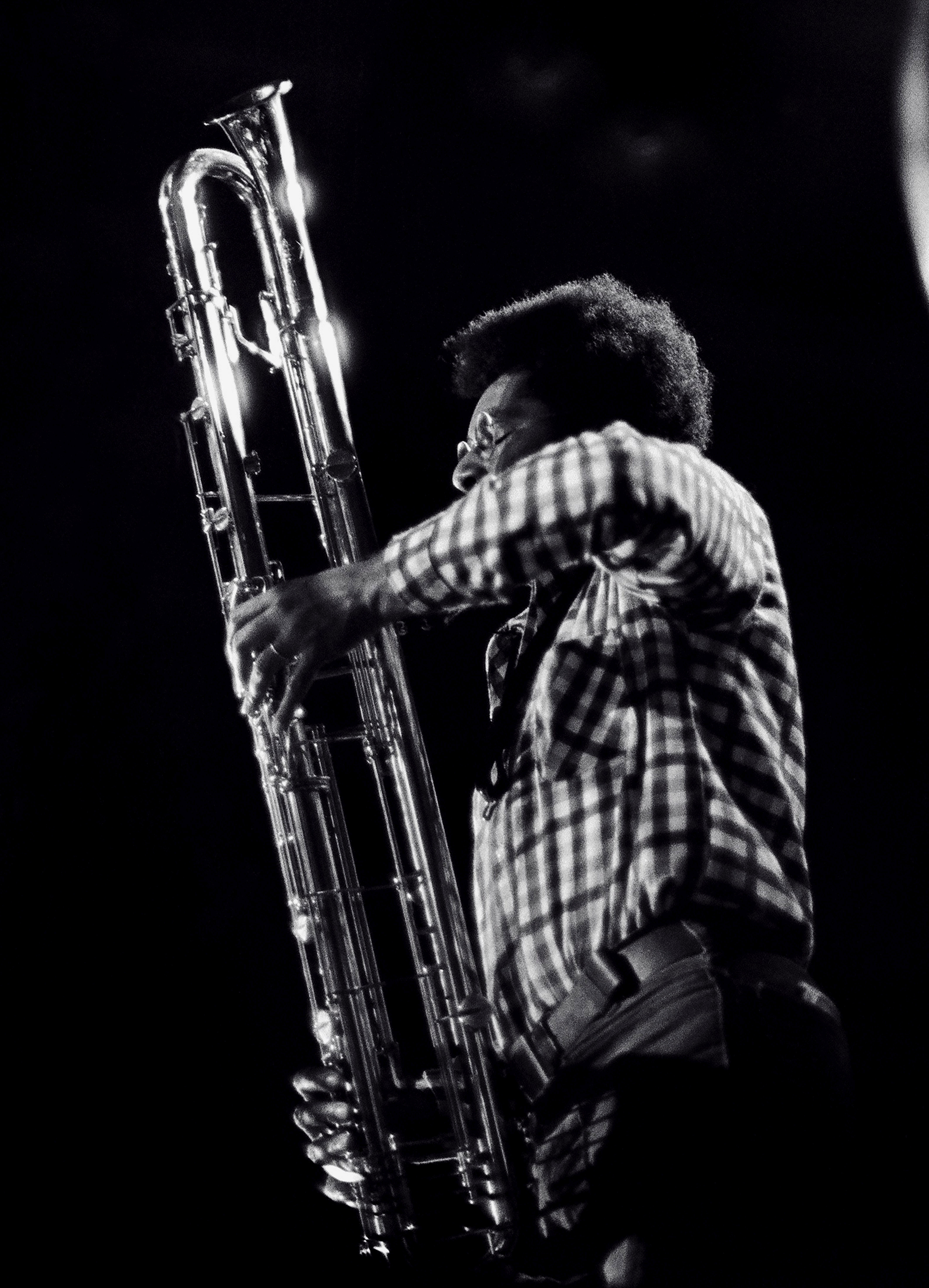
Anthony Braxton playing a paperclip contrabass clarinet in Rochester, NY, 1976

Probably the best-known musician who has made significant use of the contrabass clarinet as a solo instrument is Anthony Braxton. Other performers (most of whom use the instrument in the genres of jazz and free improvised music) include James Carter, Brian Landrus, Douglas Ewart, Vinny Golia, Mwata Bowden, Ernst Ulrich Deuker, Paolo Ravaglia, Hamiet Bluiett, Edward "Kidd" Jordan, Harry Sparnaay (NL), Armand Angster (F) and Jason Alder. Leroi Moore of the Dave Matthews Band played a contrabass clarinet on the song "So Right" from the 2001 album Everyday and John Linnell of They Might Be Giants utilizes the contra-alto clarinet on their 2013 album Nanobots, as well as subsequent releases by the band. Colin Stetson makes use of the instrument on his 2015 collaboration album Never Were the Way She Was with violinist Sarah Neufeld and Jochen Seggelke. In 2020, Sarah Watts, a bass clarinet specialist who also plays an active role in commissioning and performing new works for the contrabass clarinet, released a solo album featuring works for contrabass clarinet and piano entitled Into the Depths.

== Use in contemporary classical music ==
The contrabass clarinet has a relatively modest yet increasing presence in modern compositions. It is most commonly used in works for wind band, clarinet choir, and solo contrabass clarinet, though there exist pieces for orchestra and other ensembles that call for the contrabass clarinet, and the contrabass clarinet is heavily featured in many film scores.

Some notable composers who have written for the contrabass or contra-alto clarinet include Alfred Reed, Vincent Persichetti, John Adams, Philip Glass, David Maslanka, John Mackey, Daniel Dorff, Franco Donatoni, Elliott Carter and David Bennett Thomas.

A catalog of compositions featuring the contrabass clarinet was compiled in 2017 by performer Sarah Watts and may be downloaded without a fee from her website.

=== Concert band ===
The modern concert band (also known as a wind band or wind orchestra) is the ensemble in which the contrabass clarinet is most often found. Most modern concert band scores have parts for either contrabass or contra-alto clarinet, and the contrabass clarinet is useful within a balanced band instrumentation to solidify the low range of the woodwind section. The increasing consistency of the contrabass clarinet's inclusion in the modern concert band allows contemporary band composers to score exposed passages or solos for the instrument, which are not typically seen in other ensembles that may include the contrabass clarinet.

Some notable band works that feature the contrabass clarinet include Blue Shades by Frank Ticheli, which features a contrabass clarinet solo, and One Life Beautiful by Julie Giroux, which calls for either a contrabass clarinet in B♭ or a contra-alto clarinet in E♭. It is specified by the composer that this part is not optional.

=== Clarinet choir ===
The contrabass clarinet forms the lowest bass voice of a modern clarinet choir. While not all contemporary compositions for clarinet choir include parts for the contrabass clarinet, many do, especially more recent pieces.

Some notable works for clarinet choir that call for contrabass clarinet include Gather at The Rock by Jenni Brandon and Dusk by Steven Bryant.

=== Solo repertoire ===
The contrabass clarinet as a solo instrument has only been explored relatively recently, mirroring the relative recency of the instrument's modern development. The body of works for solo contrabass clarinet, encompassing works for unaccompanied contrabass clarinet, contrabass clarinet and piano, and contrabass clarinet and orchestra, is expanding rapidly as contemporary composers continue to explore its unique characteristics and capabilities.

Some notable works for solo contrabass clarinet include Lucien Goethals's Concerto for Contrabass Clarinet and Orchestra, Soul Searching – Contrabass Clarinet Concerto by Martin Georgiev, Ombra I and Ombra II by Franco Donatoni, and Into the Depths by Elizabeth Kelly.

=== Orchestra ===
The contrabass clarinet is a very rare visitor to the standard symphony orchestra as a member of the clarinet section, and most orchestra pieces that call for contrabass clarinet feature the instrument as a soloist. Still, there have been occasional additions to the orchestral repertoire that feature the contrabass clarinet, including On the Transmigration of Souls by John Adams, Amériques by Edgard Varèse, and La Terre est un homme by Brian Ferneyhough, which all call for contrabass clarinet as a part of their expanded woodwind sections.

=== Notable appearances in opera and film ===
- Prometeo, an unconventional opera by Luigi Nono, features the contrabass clarinet.
- Kepler, an opera by Philip Glass, features a part for contrabass clarinet doubling bass clarinet.
- A prominent contra-alto/contrabass clarinet solo may be heard in a song from the score for the 1968 film Winnie the Pooh and the Blustery Day.
- Composer Colin Stetson uses the contrabass clarinet extensively in the score for the 2018 film Hereditary.
- Composer Howard Shore features the contrabass clarinet in the score for the 2002 film The Lord of the Rings: The Two Towers.

== Sources ==
- Adler, Samuel (2016). The Study of Orchestration (4th ed.). New York: W. W. Norton & Company. ISBN 978-0-393-92065-9. LCCN 2016018709. OCLC 928443771. OL 26370811M. Wikidata Q115258889.
- Baines, Anthony (1991). Woodwind Instruments and their History (3rd ed.). New York: Dover Publications. ISBN 978-0-486-26885-9. LCCN 91023745. OCLC 24010861. OL 1544645M. Wikidata Q115155619.
- Rendall, F. Geoffrey (1971). The Clarinet: Some notes upon its history and construction (3rd ed.). New York: W. W. Norton & Company. ISBN 978-0-510-36701-5. OCLC 343308. OL 5692406M. Wikidata Q115259125.
- Ellsworth, Jane (2015), A Dictionary for the Modern Clarinetist, Dictionaries for the Modern Musician, Lanham: Rowman & Littlefield (published 2014), OL 20339354W, Wikidata Q123566349
