= Vito (disambiguation) =

Vito is a male given name. Vito or VITO may also refer to:

- VITO, also known as the Flemish Institute for Technological Research
- Mercedes-Benz Vito, van model
- Vehicle Integration Test Office, NASA entity formed to provide Space Shuttle Astronaut flight crew members insight as to the preparation, configuration and integration of the Space Transportation System prior to flight of the Space Shuttle
- Vito, a work for violin and piano by Pablo de Sarasate, part of the Spanish Dances, Op. 26
- Vito (Leblanc), brand name of musical instruments
- Vito (film), a 2011 film
- Vito (horse), a racehorse
- VITO experiment, an experimental setup at the ISOLDE facility, CERN
- Vito Kapo (1922–2020), Albanian politician
