= Vito (Leblanc) =

Brand name of musical instruments

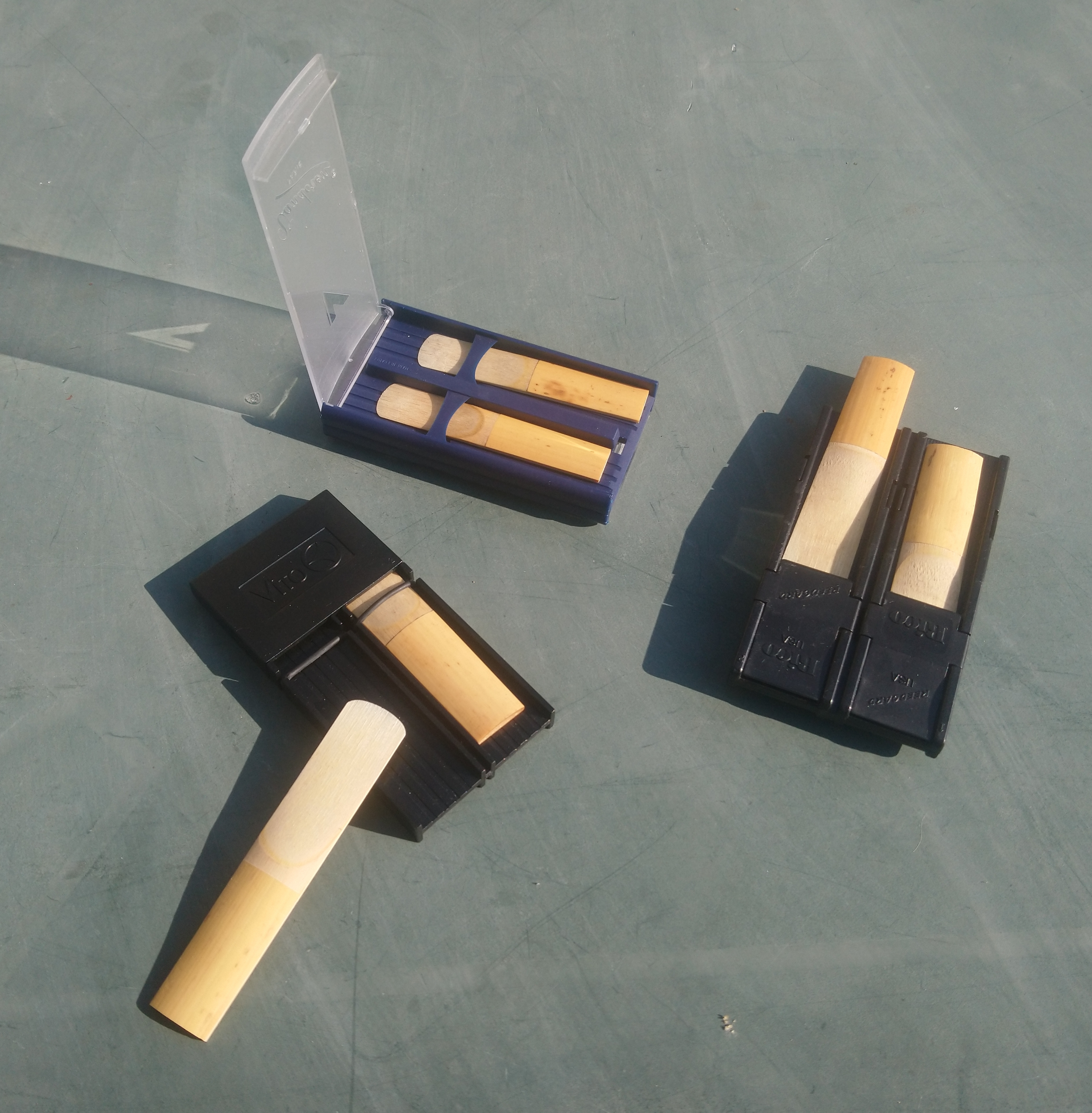

Vito is a brand name of Leblanc, started in 1951.

The trademark for Vito cites 7/23/1958 as the first use in commerce. The place where Vito saxes were originally made is Nogales Arizona at the Best Manufacturing Co under contract. In 1959 Best Mfg. Co went bankrupt closing late that year. Conn bought the plant reopening it in January 1960.

In 1978 Conn again produced Vito branded saxes In Nogales, Arizona after its return in the late 1960's first under the Artley subsidiary. Then in 1971 with the opening of the first USA manufacturing plant in Nogales Mexico Conn began making saxes. The Mexico sax operation became a parts making only facility in 1978 with instrument manufacturing moving to Nogales, Arizona.

== History ==
Vito is a brand name for Leblanc USA, now part of Conn-Selmer USA. The Vito name was used for student through professional (Yanagisawa baritone saxophone) instruments. Leblanc USA was formed in 1946 by Vito Pascucci and French woodwind manufacturer G. Leblanc Cie. To meet high demand, Leblanc USA started to manufacture clarinets in the US from plastic bodies and French keys. Eventually all of the parts were made in the US. These student clarinets were named "Vito".

Many, if not all, Vito flutes were "stencil" instruments manufactured in Japan by Yamaha. They were roughly the equivalent of a Yamaha YFL-200 series student instrument.

Some manufacturers of Vito instruments:

- Eduard Beaugnier et Cie of Mantes-la-Ville in France, located close to the Henri Selmer Paris factory. Beaugnier made soprano, alto, tenor and baritone saxophones under their own name and also as "stencils" labeled with various other names. These include: 'Leblanc', 'Vito' (comprising the Model 35, Model 37, Model 38 and 'Duke') for export to the USA, 'Noblet' and 'Revere' for the U.S.A and French markets. Beaugnier's 'Besson' and 'Selmer Pennsylvania' stencils were made for export to the United Kingdom.
- Yanagisawa of Japan - (Vito VSP: Soprano, Alto, Tenor and Baritone Saxophones). These Yanagisawa stencils were marketed in the US as intermediate /professional model horns.
- Yamaha of Japan (7131 model Alto and also Tenor Saxophones)
- KHS/Jupiter brand (7133 model Alto and Tenor Saxophones).

== Serial numbers ==
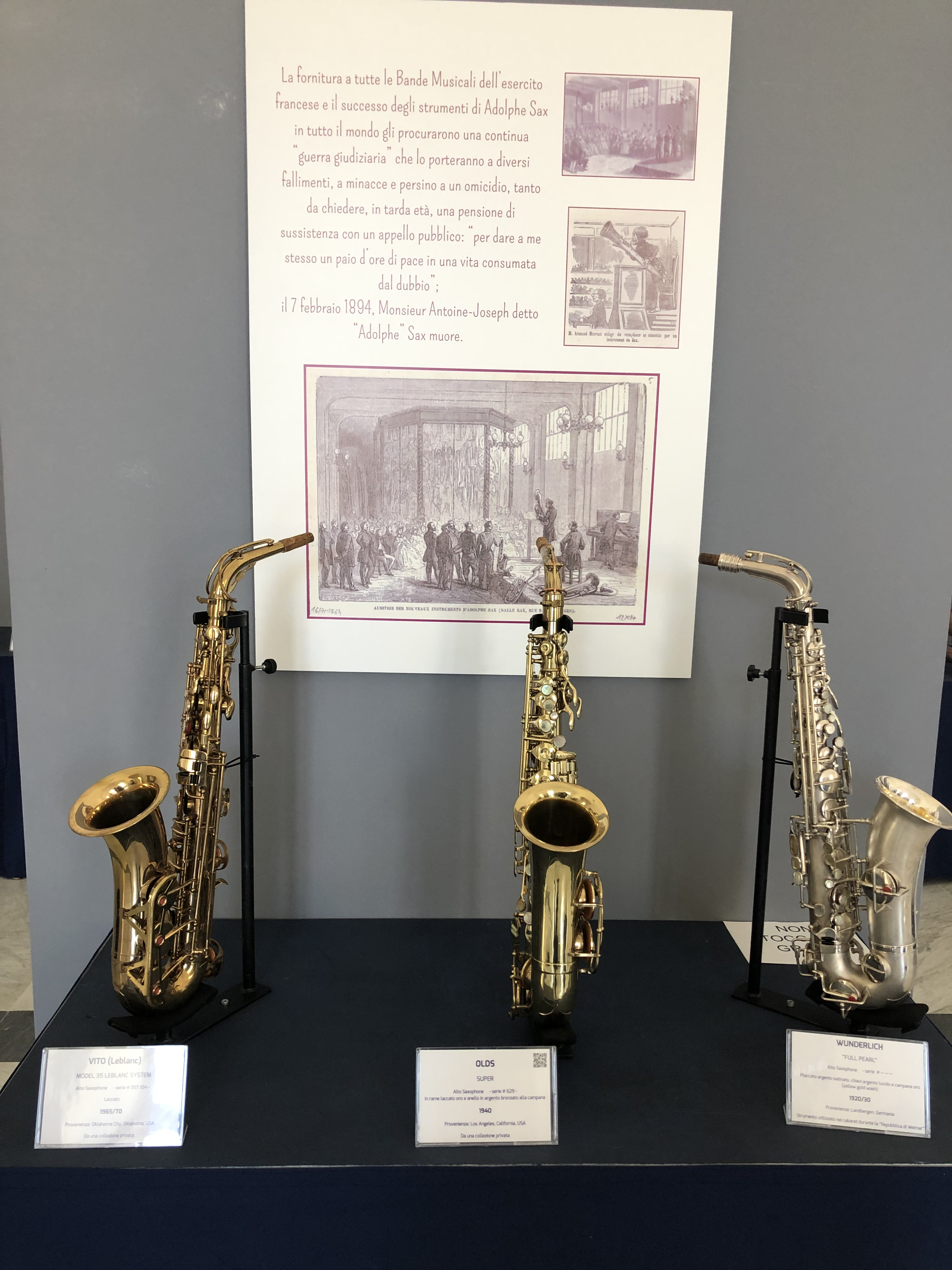

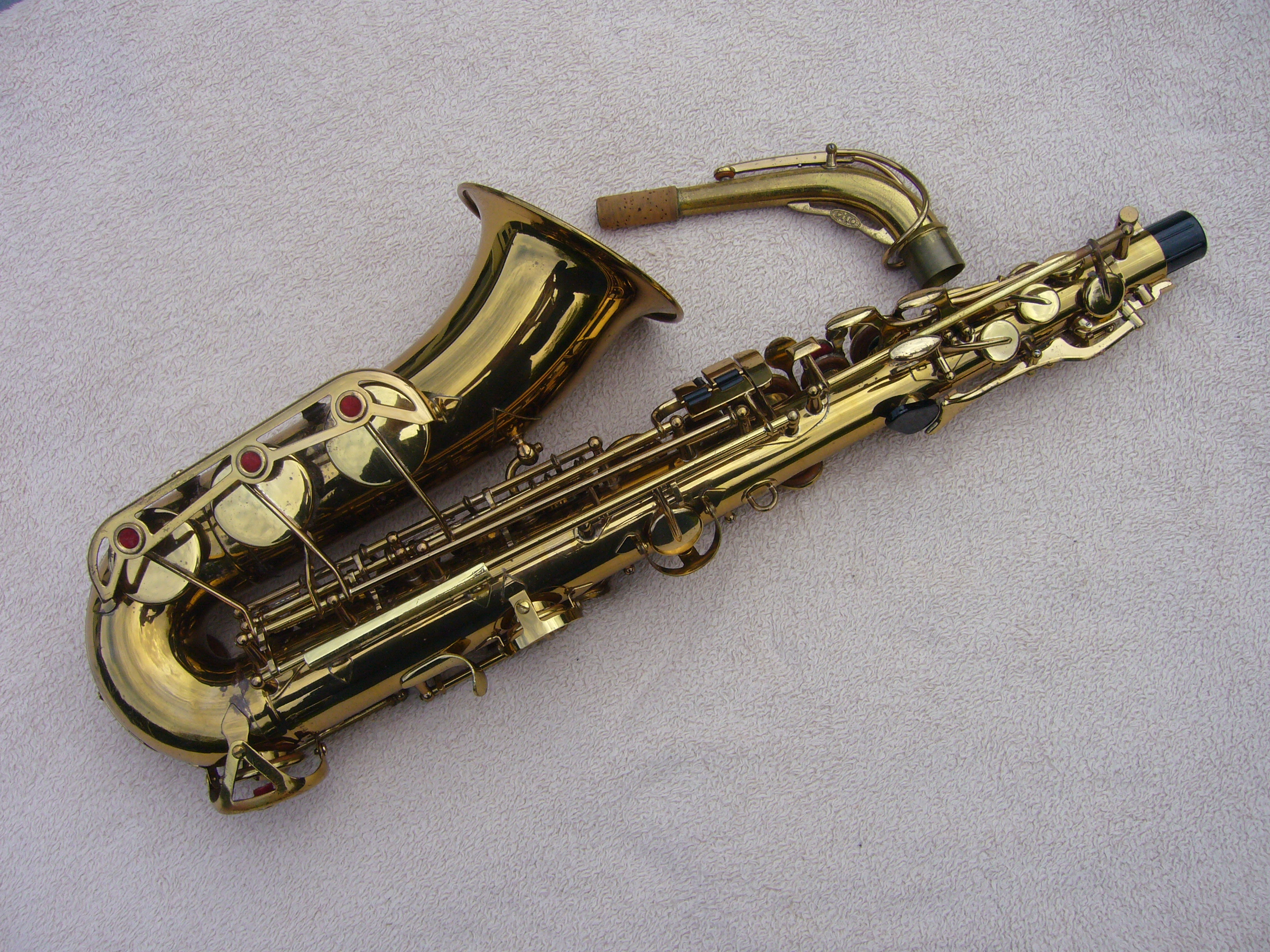

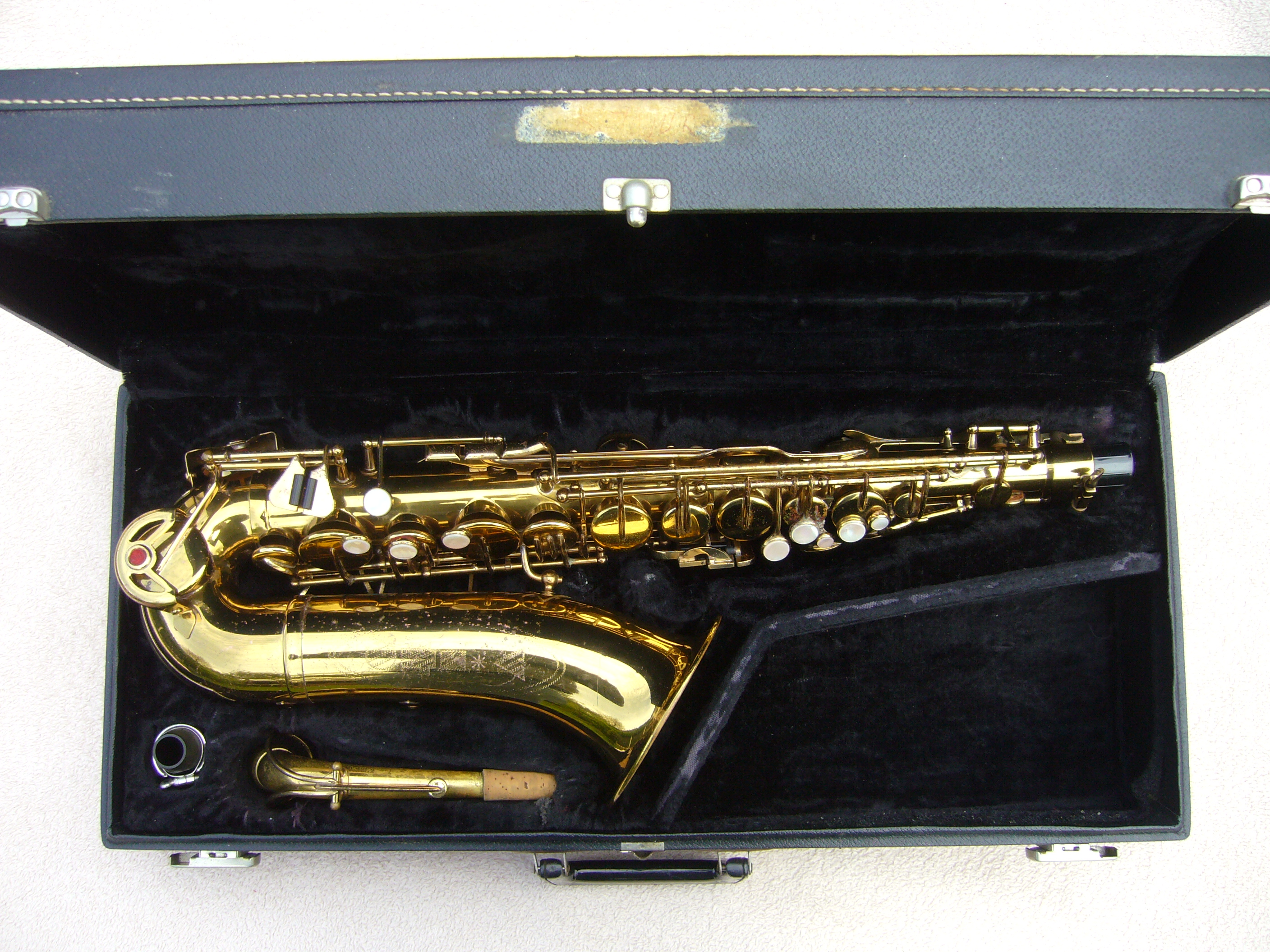

Vito Alto Saxophone Model 7131 Japan Stamped Serial Numbers.

These serial numbers ignore the leading zeros at the start of the serial numbers.

1970
1-500
1971
501-2155
1972
2156-3529
1973
3530-4421
1974
4422-12000
1975
12001-25603
1976
25604-30827
1977
30828-33947
1978
33948-38844
1979
38845-42434
1980
42435-47975
1981
47976-52455
1982
52456-58306
1983
58307-62177
1984
62178-68524
1985
68525-72535
1986
72536-78579
1987
78580-85091
1988
85092-89758
1989
89759-501000
1990
501098-510332
1991
510333-511518
1992
511519-515800
1993
515801-519845
1994
519846-526925
1995
526926-533097
1996
533098-537807
1997
537808-552998
1998
552999-560613
1999
560614-575843
2000
575842-587455
2001
587456-624567
2002
624568-654084

== Vito Saxophone models ==
- Vito 7133SS Soprano Sax
- Vito 7131R(K) Alto Sax
- Vito 7133 Alto Sax
- Vito 7131T(K) Tenor Sax
- Vito 7133T Tenor Sax
- Vito 7190BA Baritone Sax
- Vito 7136 Alto Sax
- Vito 7140 Alto Sax
