= Phosphor bronze =

Bronze where the oxygen is removed with phosphorus

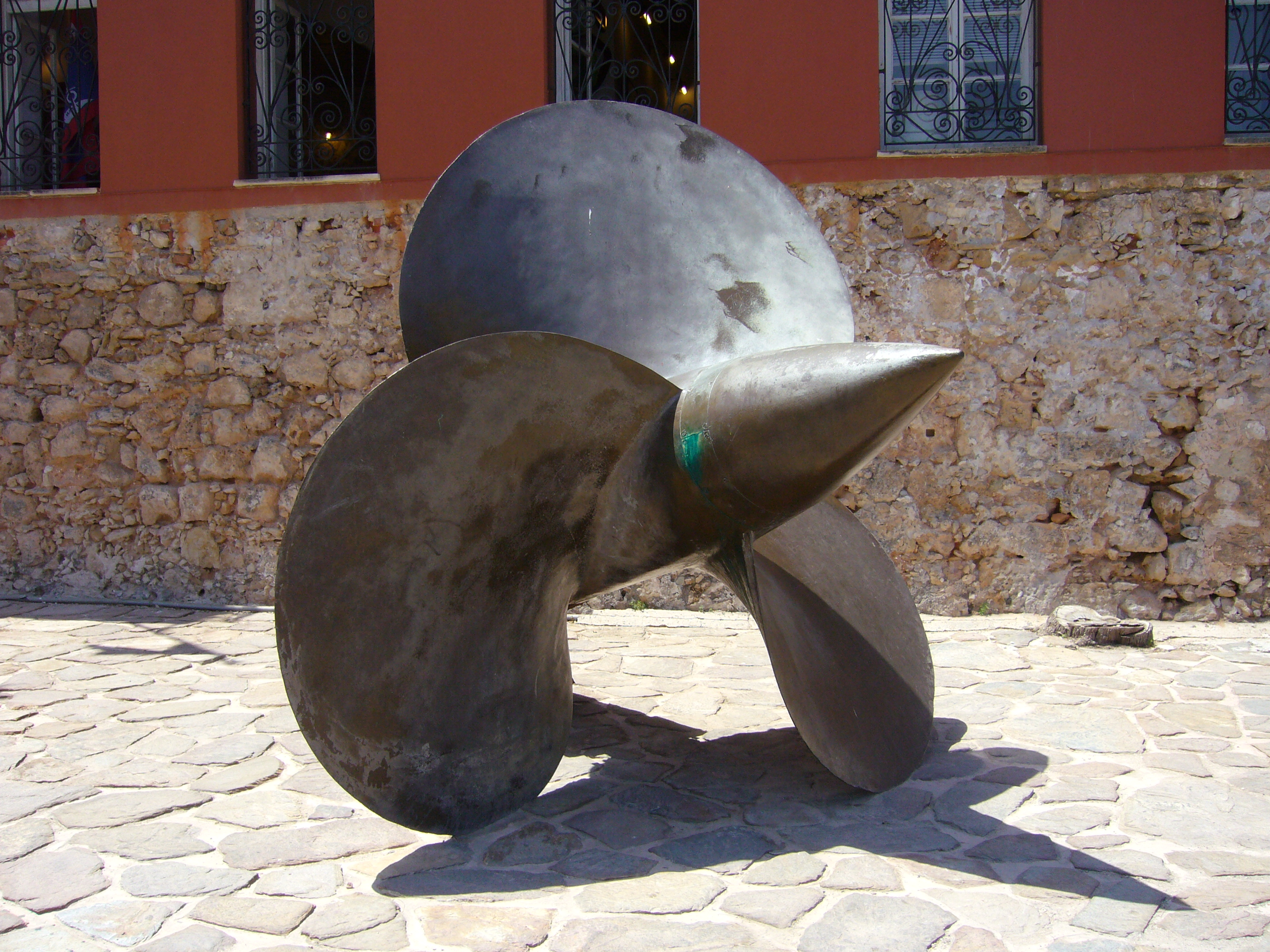
Phosphor bronze propeller salvaged from 1940s American warship.

Phosphor bronze is a member of the family of copper alloys. It is composed of copper that is alloyed with 0.5–11% of tin and 0.01–0.35% phosphorus, and may contain other elements to confer specific properties (e.g. lead at 0.5–3.0% to form free-machining phosphor bronze). The tin increases the corrosion resistance and strength of the alloy, while the phosphorus increases its wear resistance and stiffness.

Phosphor bronze alloys are notable for their toughness, strength, low coefficient of friction, and fine grain. The phosphorus reduces the viscosity of the molten alloy, which makes it easier and cleaner to cast and reduces grain boundaries between crystallites. It was originally formulated by the Belgian Georges Montefiore-Levi and the German Karl Künzel.

== Industrial uses ==
Phosphor bronze is used for springs, bolts, bushings, bearings, electrical switches with moving or sliding parts, dental bridges, the reed components of organ pipes, ship's propellers, and various other products or assemblies where resistance to fatigue, wear, and corrosion are required.

Phosphor bronze comes in a wide array of standard alloys, including nonferrous spring alloys, free-machining phosphor bronze, and bearing bronze. The combination of good physical properties, fair electrical conductivity, and moderate cost make phosphor bronze wire (available in standard round, square, flat, and special formats) desirable for many springs, electrical contacts, and a wide variety of wire forms where the desired properties do not require the use of the more-expensive beryllium copper.

Phosphor bronze with 94.8% copper, 5% tin, and 0.2% phosphorus is also used in cryogenics. In this application, its combination of fair electrical conductivity and low thermal conductivity allows the making of electrical connections to devices at ultra-low temperatures without adding excessive heat.

== Spent nuclear fuel overpack ==
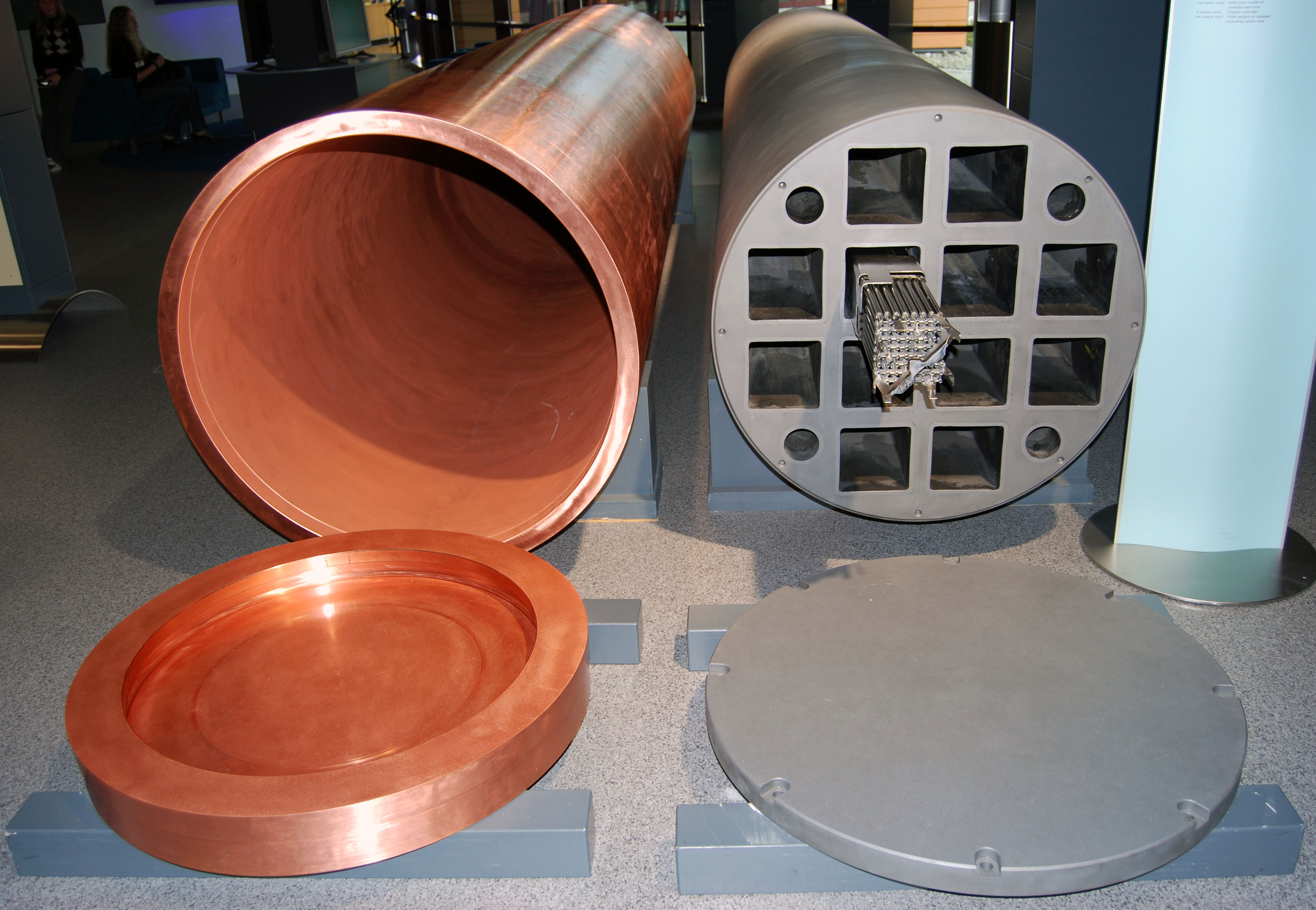
The CuOFP capsule used as overpack for spent nuclear fuel disposal in the KBS-3 concept (Finnish version).

Oxygen-free copper can be alloyed with phosphorus (CuOFP alloy) to better withstand oxidizing conditions. This alloy has application as thick corrosion-resistant overpack for spent nuclear fuel disposal in deep crystalline rocks.

== UNIVAC computer ==
Magnetic tape was first used to record computer data in 1951 on the Eckert-Mauchly UNIVAC I. The UNISERVO drive recording medium was a thin metal strip of 0.5-inch-wide (12.7-millimetre) nickel-plated phosphor bronze. The recording density was 128 characters per inch (198 micrometre/character) on eight tracks at a linear speed of 100 in/s (2.54 m/s), yielding a data rate of 12,800 characters per second. Of the eight tracks, six were data, one was a parity track, and one was a clock, or timing track. Making allowance for the empty space between tape blocks, the actual transfer rate was around 7,200 characters per second. A small reel of mylar tape provided separation from the metal tape and the read/write head.

== Musical instruments ==
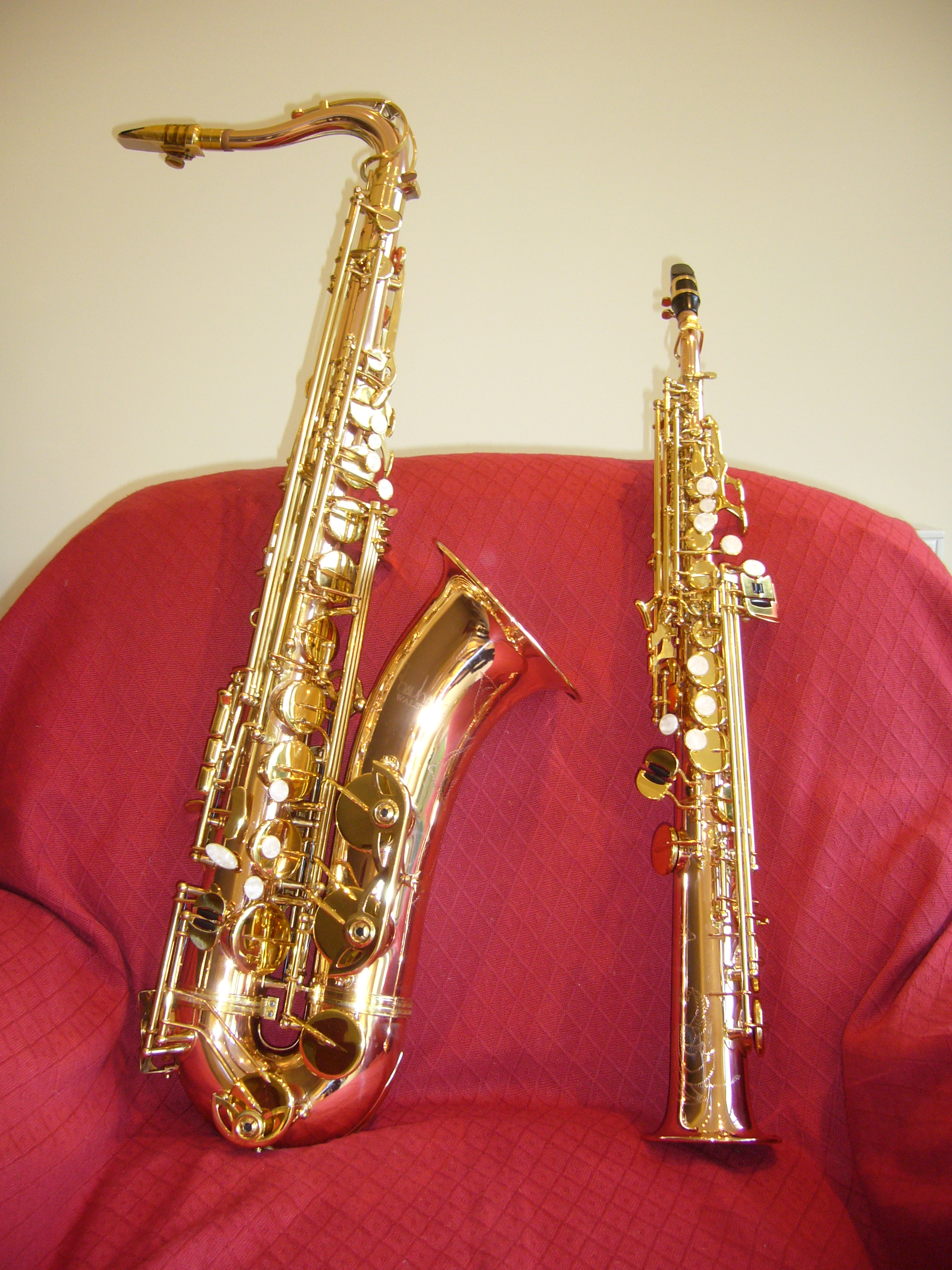
Phosphor bronze tenor and soprano saxophones

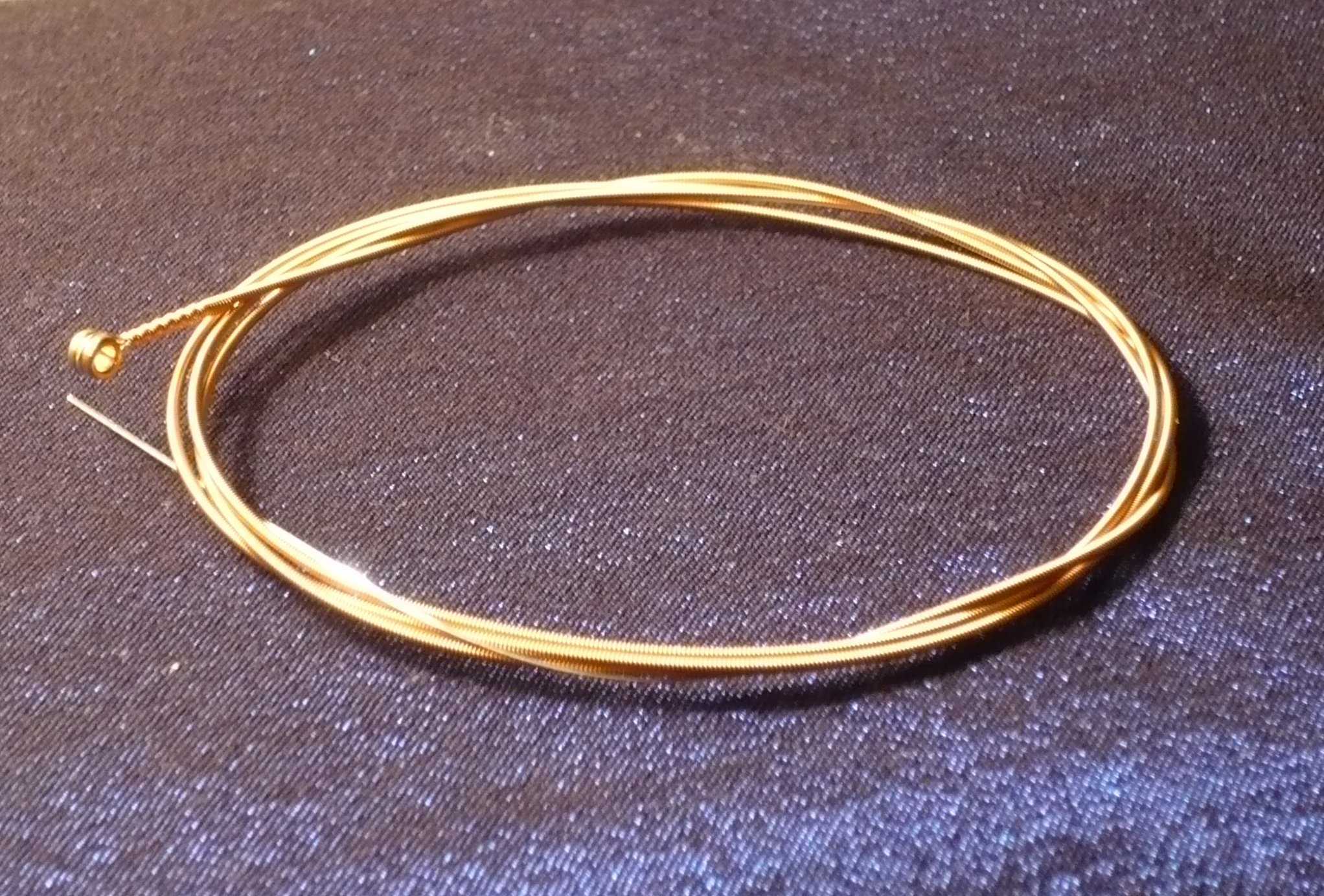
Acoustic guitar string wrapped with phosphor bronze

Phosphor bronze is preferred over brass for cymbals because of its greater resilience, leading to broader tonal spectrum and greater sustain.

Phosphor bronze is one of several high-copper-content alloys used as a substitute for the more-common "yellow" or "cartridge" types of brass to construct the bodies and bells of metal wind instruments. Examples of instruments constructed using high-copper alloys occur among members of the brass instrument family (trumpets, flugelhorns, and trombones) and one member of the reed instrument family, saxophones. In addition to the distinctive appearance provided by the reddish-orange hue of high-copper alloys, they are purported by some instrument designers, sellers, and players to provide a broader harmonic response spectrum for a given instrument design. The Yanagisawa 902/992 model saxophones (pictured) have bodies of phosphor bronze, in contrast to the brass 901/991 models.

Some instrument strings for acoustic guitars, mandolins, and violins are wrapped with phosphor bronze. Some harmonica reeds are made of phosphor bronze, such as those by Suzuki Musical Instrument Corporation and Bushman Harmonicas.

The reed component of reed-type organ pipes is usually made of phosphor bronze owing to its high wear resistance and low deformability under conditions of constant vibration when producing sound.

Some snare drums are constructed with phosphor bronze.

Some tambourine jingles are made of phosphor bronze.

== Variants ==
Further increasing the phosphorus content leads to the formation of a very hard compound, Cu_{3}P (copper phosphide), resulting in a brittle form of phosphor bronze, which has a narrow range of applications.

Around 2001, the Olin Corporation developed another alloy for use in electrical and electronic connectors which they referred to as "phosphor bronze". Its composition was as follows:

- Zinc – 9.9%
- Tin – 2.2%
- Iron – 1.9%
- Phosphorus – 0.03%
- Copper – 85.97%

When assessed in strictly metallurgical terms it is not a phosphor bronze, but a form of iron-modified tin brass.
