= Steinway Musical Instruments =

American musical instrument manufacturer

- Company type: Private
- Industry: Musical instruments
- Founded: 1995; 31 years ago
- Headquarters: Astoria, New York, United States
- Number of locations: 11 manufacturing facilities (2011)
- Area served: Worldwide
- Products: Pianos; Brasswinds; Woodwinds; Strings; Percussion
- Owner: Paulson & Co.
- Number of employees: 1,680 (2011)
- Divisions: New York City, United States; Elkhart, Indiana, United States
- Subsidiaries: Steinway & Sons; Steinway Hall; Conn-Selmer; Kluge Klaviaturen; The O.S. Kelly Company; ArkivMusic

Steinway Musical Instruments, Inc. is a worldwide musical instrument manufacturing and marketing conglomerate, based in Astoria, New York, the United States. It was formed in a 1995 merger between the Selmer Industries and Steinway Musical Properties, the parent company of Steinway & Sons piano manufacturers. From 1996 to 2013, Steinway Musical Instruments was traded at the New York Stock Exchange (NYSE) under the abbreviation LVB, for Ludwig van Beethoven. It was acquired by the Paulson & Co. private capital firm in 2013.

Through acquisitions and mergers, the company has acquired a large number of musical instrument brand names and manufacturing facilities. Steinway Musical Instruments acquired the flute manufacturer Emerson in 1997, the piano keyboard maker Kluge in 1998, and the Steinway Hall in Manhattan in 1999. In 2000 it acquired the wind instrument manufacturer United Musical Instruments and in 2003 merged it with their subsidiary The Selmer Company to form the Conn-Selmer subsidiary. In 2004 it acquired the wind instrument manufacturer Leblanc and placed it under Conn-Selmer. It now owns manufacturers of pianos, brasswinds, woodwinds, strings, and percussion. Brands produced under it include Steinway & Sons pianos, Bach Stradivarius trumpets, C.G. Conn French horns, Leblanc clarinets, King trombones, Ludwig drums, and Selmer saxophones and woodwinds.

The company sells its products through a worldwide network of dealers to professional, amateur and student musicians, as well as orchestras and educational institutions, under dozens of different brand names. It holds exclusive distribution rights for Selmer (Paris) wind instruments and Yanagisawa saxophones in the United States.

It employs a workforce of around 1,700 and operates 11 manufacturing facilities in the United States and Europe, in addition to Asian contract manufacturers.

== History ==
- May 1995: Selmer Industries acquired Steinway Musical Properties, parent company of Steinway & Sons piano company.
- July 1996: Selmer Industries was renamed "Steinway Musical Instruments".
- August 1996: Steinway Musical Instruments IPO.
- January 1997: acquisition of Emerson, flute manufacturer.
- December 1998: acquisition of Kluge Klaviaturen, piano key manufacturer.
- March 1999: acquisition of Steinway Hall in New York City, prominent piano showroom with concert hall.
- November 1999: acquisition of the O.S. Kelly Company, piano plate manufacturer.
- January 2000: acquisition of Pianohaus Karl Lang, piano showroom and authorized Steinway piano dealer.
- September 2000: acquisition of United Musical Instruments, wind instrument manufacturer.
- January 2003: merger of the Selmer Company and United Musical Instruments into one entity under Conn-Selmer.
- August 2004: acquisition of G. Leblanc, wind instrument manufacturer and distributor.
- May 2008: acquisition of ArkivMusic, online retailer of recorded classical music.
- September 2013: acquired by Paulson & Co.

== Products ==
=== Current products ===
The company and its subsidiaries produces instruments under the following brand names:

- Pianos:
  - Steinway & Sons – pianos for the top-level market
  - Boston – pianos for the mid-level market
  - Essex – pianos for the entry-level market
- Brasswinds:
  - Bach – trumpets, cornets, flugelhorns, trombones
  - Conn – single and double horns, flugelhorns, cornets, trombones, trumpets, tubas, sousaphones, saxophones
  - Holton – cornets, French horns, trombones, trumpets
  - King – marching brass, trombones, baritones, cornets, flugelhorns, French horns, mellophones, trumpets, tubas, sousaphones
  - Prelude – trumpets, marching brass, piccolos, flutes, clarinets, saxophones (entry-level instruments) (Chinese)
- Woodwinds:
  - Armstrong – flutes, piccolos
  - Leblanc – clarinets
  - Selmer – saxophones, clarinets, flutes, oboes, bassoons
  - Vito – entry-level clarinets
- Strings:
  - Glaesel – violins, violas, cellos, double basses (Chinese)
  - Scherl & Roth – violins, violas, cellos, double basses (Chinese)
  - Wm. Lewis & Son – violins, violas, cellos, double basses (Chinese)
- Percussion and drums:
  - Ludwig
  - Musser
- Other:
  - Listen: Life with Music & Culture – magazines
  - Rousseau – woodwind mouthpieces
  - Steinway & Sons Label – record label

=== Discontinued products ===
- Brasswinds:
  - Benge – trumpets, piccolo trumpets, trombones
  - Cleveland
  - Martin – trumpets, trombones
- Woodwinds:
  - Artley
  - Avanti – flutes
  - Emerson – flutes, piccolos
  - Galway Spirit Flutes – flutes
  - Noblet
  - Normandy
