= La Couture-Boussey =

- Commune
- Coat of arms
- Location of La Couture-Boussey
- Location within France Location within Normandy
- Coordinates: 48°53′52″N 1°24′21″E
- Country: France
- Region: Normandy
- Department: Eure
- Arrondissement: Évreux
- Canton: Saint-André-de-l'Eure
- Intercommunality: CA Évreux Portes de Normandie

Government
  - Mayor (2020–2026): Sylvain Boreggio
- Area^{1}: 10.9 km^{2} (4.2 sq mi)
- Elevation: 135 m (443 ft)
- Highest elevation: 137 m (449 ft)
- Lowest elevation: 95 m (312 ft)
- Population (2023): 2,295
  - Density: 211/km^{2} (545/sq mi)
- Time zone: UTC+01:00 (CET)
  - Summer (DST): UTC+02:00 (CEST)
- INSEE/Postal code: 27183 /27750
- ^{1} French Land Register data, which excludes lakes, ponds, glaciers > 1 km^{2} (0.386 sq mi or 247 acres) and river estuaries.

La Couture-Boussey (French pronunciation: [la kutyʁ busɛ]) is a commune in the Eure department in northern France. The town is known for the musical instrument manufacturing company G. Leblanc Cie, established by the Leblanc family in the late 19th century. The world's largest clarinet, the octocontrabass clarinet, is found in the town's instrument museum, Musée des Instruments à vent.

== Population ==
Historical population
Year	Pop.	±% p.a.
1968	907	—
1975	966	+0.90%
1982	1,533	+6.82%
1990	1,724	+1.48%
1999	1,957	+1.42%
2007	2,187	+1.40%
2012	2,277	+0.81%
2017	2,314	+0.32%
2023	2,295	−0.14%
Source: INSEE

== See also ==
- Communes of the Eure department
