= Leblanc (musical instrument manufacturer) =

Brand of woodwind instruments, former manufacturer

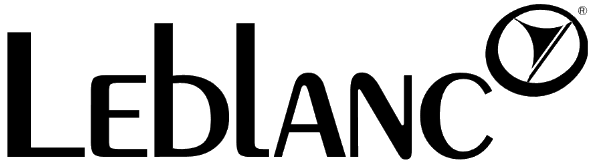
- Formerly: G. Leblanc Cie
- Type: Private (1890s–2004); Brand (2004–present)
- Industry: Musical instruments
- Founded: c. 1890s in La Couture-Boussey, France
- Founder: Georges Leblanc
- Fate: Company defunct in 2004, became a brand
- Headquarters: Kenosha, Wisconsin, United States
- Key people: Léon Leblanc; Vito Pascucci
- Products: Current: Clarinets; Former: Saxophones, mouthpieces, trumpets, trombones
- Brands: Vito
- Owner: Conn-Selmer (2004–)
- Subsidiaries: Frank Holton; Bublitz Case; Woodwind; Martin

Leblanc, Inc. was a musical instruments manufacturing company first established in 19th century France and later based in Kenosha, Wisconsin. The company was a woodwind instrument manufacturer known mainly for its clarinets. In 2004 the firm was sold to Conn-Selmer, a division of Steinway Musical Instruments. As a result, Leblanc ceased to exist as an independent operation, becoming a brand.

The company manufactured and distributed a wide range of instruments – self produced or through its subsidiaries and brands– such as clarinets, saxophones, trumpets, trombones and mouthpieces.

Nowadays, only clarinets are manufactured and sold under the Leblanc brand, offering a range from traditional to bass clarinets to contrabass and contralto clarinets.

== History ==
"G. Leblanc Cie". was established in France by Georges Leblanc late in the 19th century, in La Couture-Boussey. In 1904 the company acquired Ets. D. Noblet, the oldest instrument manufacturer in France (established 1750). In 1945, Léon Leblanc (1900–2000) met Vito Pascucci (1922–2003), then on duty as the instruments manager and repair technician for the Glenn Miller US Army Air Force Orchestra. Pascucci and Miller had discussed opening a musical instrument distributing company and importing instruments after the war. The idea lived on with Pascucci after Miller died, and he was scouting potential suppliers. He and Leblanc reached an agreement and in 1946 founded the G. Leblanc Corporation based in Kenosha, Wisconsin.

In addition to Leblanc clarinets, the G. Leblanc Corporation started importing brasswinds and saxophones made by the French firms Courtois and Beaugnier, respectively, branded "Leblanc." Leblanc's most distinctive saxophones at the time were its Model 100 and 120 "System" saxophones, the latest iteration of instruments designed by G. Leblanc since the early 1930s to alleviate acoustic problems inherent in the standard key system and offer more fingering choices.

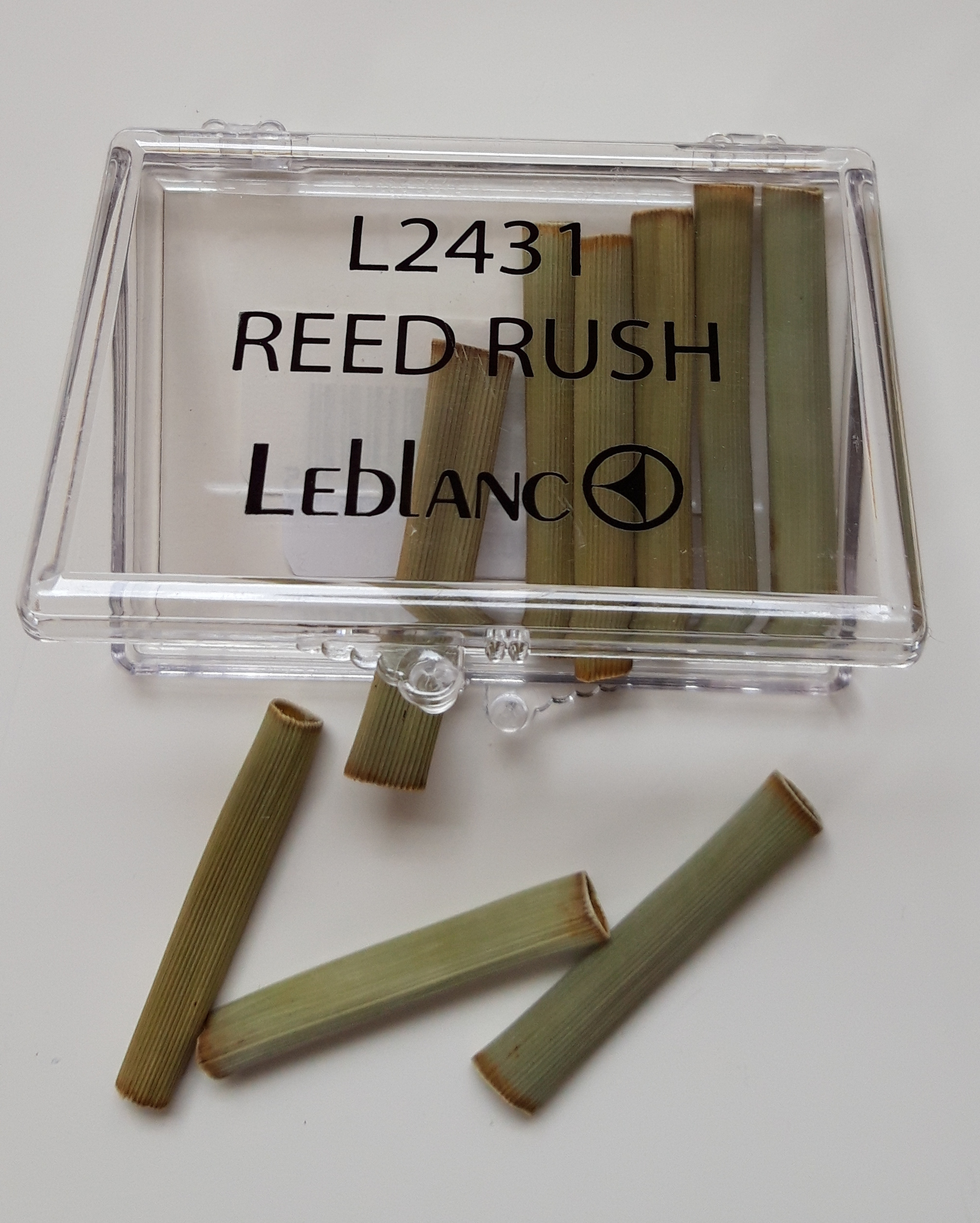
Reed rush from Leblanc

Leblanc broadened its product line and distribution with the acquisition of several other companies: the Frank Holton Company (manufacturer of brass instruments) in 1964; the Bublitz Case Company, manufacturer of musical instrument cases in 1966; The Woodwind Company (manufacturer of woodwind mouthpieces) in 1968; and the Martin Band Instrument Company (brand rights and distribution network for brass instruments and saxophones) acquired from the Wurlitzer Co. in 1971.

Yanagisawa saxophones were first marketed by Leblanc in the late 1960s under the Leblanc and Vito brands, and the Martin brand after 1971, prior to their distribution under Yanagisawa's own name. In 1981 Leblanc became the exclusive marketer and distributor of the Yanagisawa products in the United States and Canada.

In 1989 the American Leblanc firm acquired majority interest in G. Leblanc Cie. and took over its management. A line of classical guitars was manufactured in Japan for the G. Leblanc corporation. Models include 301-c, 701-f, and possibly others.

=== The Vito brand ===
Beginning in 1951, the American Leblanc firm started manufacturing student model clarinets under the Vito brand. The bores were produced at Leblanc's Kenosha facility and the hardware was supplied by G. Leblanc Cie. Vito brass instruments were sourced from Holton, which later was acquired by Leblanc in 1964.

After briefly sourcing its Vito saxophones from Holton, Leblanc imported Beaugnier saxophone parts to be assembled in Kenosha and sold under the Vito brand. By the late 1950s Vito saxophones were also assembled from parts supplied by the Art Best Manufacturing Company of Nogales, Arizona, with some differences from the Beaugnier designs. The two series of Vito saxophones are referred to as Vito-France and Vito-Kenosha. The most distinctive model from this period was the Vito Model 35, with a key system based on the Leblanc "system" design. During the mid-to-late 1960s Leblanc started sourcing saxophone parts from Yamaha for the Vito-Kenosha line, producing saxophones with both American and Japanese parts.

Between 1968 and 1970 Leblanc introduced saxophones under the Vito-Japan line, consisting of alto and tenor saxophones from Yamaha (7131 models), and soprano, alto, and baritone saxophones from Yanagisawa (VSP models). Leblanc imported Yamaha flutes for its Vito-Japan line starting in 1970.

Leblanc added the KHS company of Taiwan as a source for Vito saxophones in 1981. The KHS versions were sold as models 7133, 7136, 7140, and 7190.

The Vito line of woodwinds was discontinued in 2004, although the equivalent models of saxophones continued to be made by Yamaha and KHS (Jupiter). The Vito line of brasswinds was discontinued in 2007.

=== Sale and reorganization ===
The company was sold on 1 August 2004 to Steinway Musical Instruments and placed under Steinway's Conn-Selmer subsidiary. Conn-Selmer closed Leblanc's Kenosha facility in 2007 and they moved their French operation to their facility in Elkhart, Indiana. Leblanc's Martin brand of brasswinds was discontinued and production of Holton brasswinds was moved from Elkhorn, Wisconsin to the Conn-Selmer's facility in Eastlake, Ohio in 2008. Leblanc's French clarinet plant was sold to the Buffet Group in 2008
