= Kluge (disambiguation) =

Kluge is a German surname.

Kluge also may refer to:

- An improvised engineering patch, also spelled kludge
- Kluge, a German piano-keyboard maker, acquired by Steinway & Sons in 1998
- Kluge (book), a 2008 non-fiction book by Gary Marcus
- Die Kluge, an opera by Carl Orff
- Kh-555, also known as AS-22 "Kluge", a Russian air-launched cruise missile
