= Pascucci (surname) =

Pascucci is a surname. Notable people with it include:

- Felipe Pascucci (1907–1966), Italian football manager
- Francesco Pascucci (1748 - after 1803), Spanish-Italian painter
- Ilaria Pascucci, Italian astrophysicist
- Luigi Arbib Pascucci (d. 1942), Italian tank commander
- Valentino Pascucci (born 1978), American baseball player
- Vito Pascucci (1922–2003), American businessman
