= Yanagisawa Wind Instruments =

Japanese manufacturing company

Yanagisawa Wind Instruments Company, Ltd.
- Company type: Private
- Industry: Musical instruments
- Founded: 1894; 132 years ago
- Founder: Tokutaro Yanagisawa
- Headquarters: Japan
- Area served: Worldwide
- Key people: Nobushige Yanagisawa, CEO
- Products: Sopranino, soprano, alto, tenor, and baritone saxophones
- Website: yanagisawasax.co.jp

Yanagisawa Wind Instruments Co., Ltd. is a Japanese woodwind instrument manufacturing company known for its range of professional grade saxophones. Along with Yamaha, they are one of the leading manufacturers of saxophones in Japan. The company currently manufactures sopranino, soprano, alto, tenor, and baritone saxophones.

In the United States, Yanagisawa products are commercialized and distributed by Conn-Selmer, a subsidiary of Steinway Musical Instruments.

== History ==
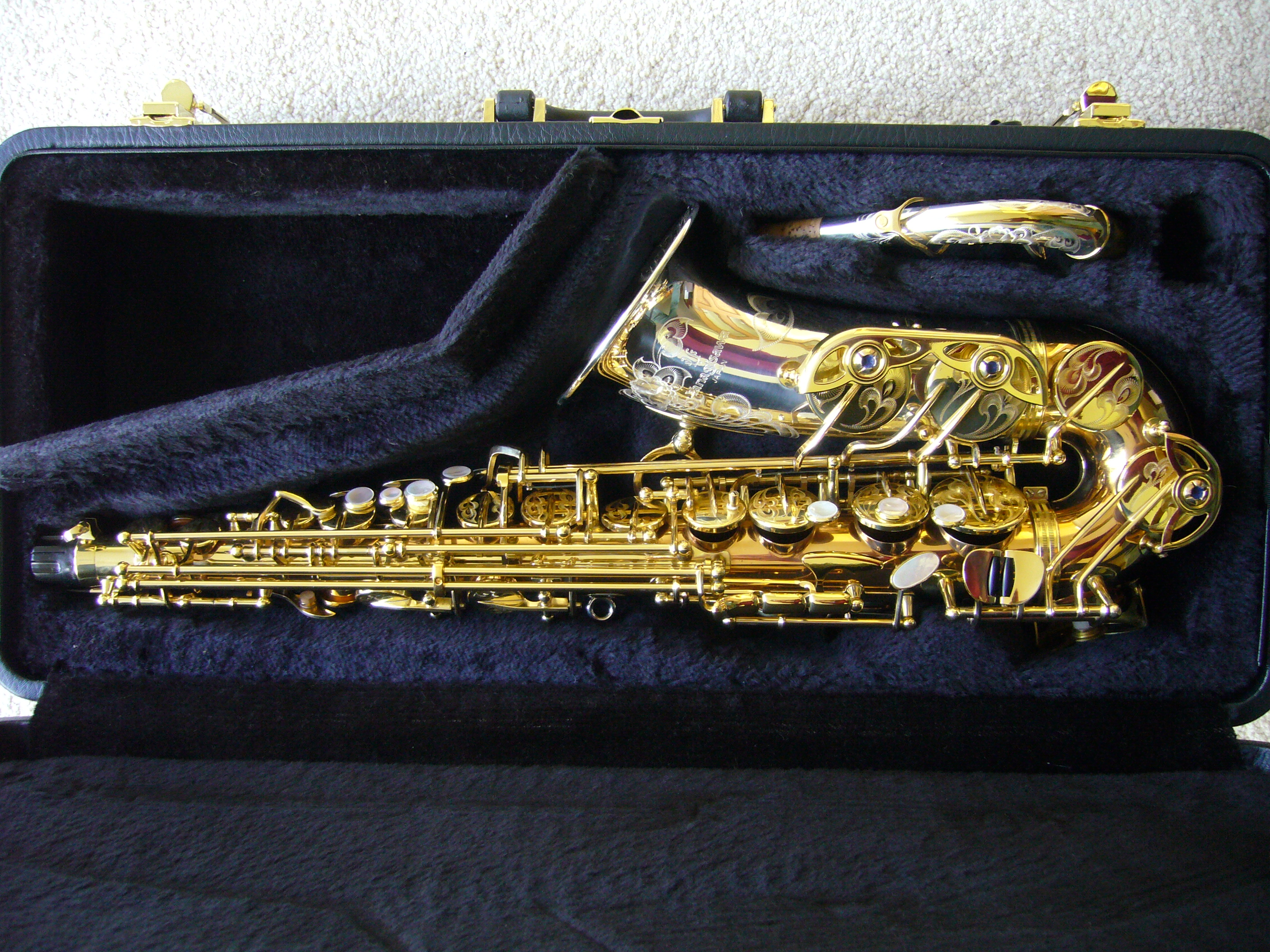
The Yanagisawa A9932J alto saxophone has a solid silver bell and neck with a solid phosphor bronze body. The bell, neck, and key-cups are extensively engraved. This was manufactured in 2008

The history of woodwind manufacturing in Japan has its origins in 1894 when Tokutaro Yanagisawa began repairing imported woodwinds for military band members. Tokutaro's repair shop soon evolved into an instrument factory—the first to build woodwind instruments on Japanese soil. Tokutaro's son Takanobu followed in his father's footsteps, choosing to pursue a career in the craft of instrument-making. Takanobu built his first prototype saxophone in 1951.

Starting in the late 1960s, Yanagisawa exported saxophones sold under various distributor's names, providing a large portion of the instruments sold under the Vito (Japan) brand and representing Leblanc's Martin brand for saxophones starting in 1971. In 1978, the 800 series models were introduced. These became the first Yanagisawa saxophones exported under Yanagisawa's own name.

In 1980, the 500 series was introduced for sale under other brand names in the student/intermediate market. With the growth of Yanagisawa's reputation, interest in finding Yanagisawa instruments sold under other brand names has become heightened in the used instrument market.

The Yanagisawa soprano saxophone designs became influential throughout rest of the industry, comparable to the influence of Selmer (Paris) and Yamaha saxophones in other ranges. Yanagisawa introduced innovations including detachable straight and curved necks and a high G key for its 990 series soprano saxophones.<

Product development timeline:

1954

First tenor saxophone (the T-3 model) enters production.

1956–1966

First alto saxophone (A-3) is unveiled, and A-5 alto and T-5 tenor models are introduced. Development work is completed on a low-A baritone model (B-6).

1968

Japan's first soprano saxophone (S-6) is placed on the market. The SN-600 sopranino model with high-E key is finished and released.

1978–1985

The Elimona (Elite Monarch) series (800 series) is launched. Japan's first curved soprano model is unveiled. The world's first straight soprano model with detachable neck (S-880) is announced.

1990–1996

Yanagisawa's 900- and 990-series soprano and baritone models are introduced. The first Silver Sonic model (9930 series) is unveiled in soprano, alto, tenor, and baritone ranges in Japan. Alto and tenor models are added to the 900 and 990 series, which later evolve into the 900μ and 990μ series.

1999

The A-9937 alto model with sterling silver neck, body, bow, and bell is announced.

2000

The sterling T-9937 tenor model hits the market and Yanagisawa introduces its top baritone model, the B-9930BSB. Yanagisawa launches the bronze-bodied 992GP series with gold-plated finish.

2001

The bronze 992PGP series debuts with new pink-gold plated models.

2002

The 9937PGP series is born, rounding out the all-sterling lineup with pink-gold plated models. Yanagisawa unveils its bronze A-902 alto.

2003

Yanagisawa unveils the T-902, the tenor version of its bronze alto model.

2004

The SC-991 and SC-992 curved soprano models are announced.

2006

Yanagisawa builds the A-9914, the world's first alto saxophone with neck, body, bow, and bell crafted entirely in 14K gold. Reference prototypes are exhibited at the Frankfurt Musikmesse trade show.

2008

The SC-9937 curved soprano sax with all-sterling neck, body, bow, and bell is introduced

2014

The WO series Alto is launched.

2015

The WO series Tenor is launched.

2017

The WO series Soprano is launched.

2018

The WO series Curved soprano, and Baritone are launched.

2019

New ligature the Yany SIXS, and neck screw Yany BooStar are launched.

== Production ==
The company is notable for making saxophones from materials other than standard brass (i.e., phosphor bronze and solid silver, and combinations thereof). Their first solid silver saxophone was produced in 1972 and instruments made from phosphor bronze began to be produced in 1992. The 8830 model alto and tenor saxophones, introduced in 1988, combined silver necks and bells with a brass body tube, reminiscent of the King "Silversonic" instruments. Similar combinations are offered in current production, as illustrated by Yanagisawa's 2015 range of alto saxophone offerings:

- AWO1 - made entirely from solid brass. The entry level professional saxophone from Yanagisawa.
- AWO1U - same as AWO1, but unlacquered
- AWO1B - same as AWO1, but black lacquered
- AWO1S - same as AWO1, but silver-plated
- AWO2 - made entirely from solid phosphor bronze (except keywork, which is brass)
- AWO2S - same as AWO2, but silver-plated
- AWO10 - made entirely from solid brass (underslung neck)
- AWO10U - made entirely from solid brass (underslung neck - unlacquered)
- AWO10S - same as AWO10, but plated with silver
- AWO10GP - same as AWO10, but gold-plated
- AWO10B - same as AWO10, but coated with black lacquer
- AWO20 - made entirely from solid phosphor bronze (except keywork, which is brass)
- AWO20U - same as AWO20, but unlacquered
- AWO20S - same as AWO20, but silver-plated
- AWO20PG - same as AWO20, but plated with "pink gold" (80% gold and 20% silver)
- AWO20GP - same as AWO20, but gold-plated
- AWO30 - solid silver crook and body with solid brass bell and bow
- AWO32J - solid silver crook and bell, solid phosphor bronze body and bow (designed exclusively for jazz, so no 'lyre' socket)
- AWO33 - solid silver neck and bell; solid brass body, bow, and crook
- AWO35 - solid silver neck, body, and bell; solid brass bow
- AWO37 - solid silver crook, body, bow, and bell
- AWO37PG - same as AWO37, but pink gold-plated
- AWO37GP - same as AWO37, but gold-plated

The permutations are increased by the fact that it is possible to buy a solid brass, silver, or bronze neck from Yanagisawa and fit it to any of the nine instruments listed above (e.g., adding a solid silver neck to the AWO10 or AWO20 or a phosphor bronze neck to the AWO10, AWO32J, or AWO37).

== Musicians ==
Professional saxophonists performing on Yanagisawa instruments include Gary Bartz, Jay Beckenstein, Plas Johnson, Ed Wynne, Steve Slagle, Peter King, Vincent Herring, Snake Davis, Greg Osby, Antonio Hart, Jean Denis Michat, Paul Corn (Composer of the Paul Corn Jazz Collective), Pascal Bonnet, Jess Gillam, David Pons, Brandon Sham and Jeroen Vanbever. Arno Bornkamp has performed occasionally with a Yanagisawa Soprano. Raaf Hekkema uses a Elimona Soprano as his standard instrument.
