= Conn-Selmer =

American manufacturer of musical instruments

Conn-Selmer, Inc.
- Type: Subsidiary
- Industry: Musical instruments
- Founded: 2003; 23 years ago
- Headquarters: Elkhart, Indiana, U.S.
- Number of locations: Around 5 facilities (2011)
- Area served: Worldwide
- Key people: John Fulton; President (since 2025)
- Products: Brasswinds, percussion and string instruments
- Brands: List: Armstrong (flutes); C.G. Conn; Henri Selmer Paris; Holton; King; Leblanc; Ludwig; Scherl & Roth; Vincent Bach; Yanagisawa
- Parent: Steinway Musical Instruments, Inc.
- Website: www.connselmer.com

Conn-Selmer, Inc. is a manufacturer of musical instruments for concert bands, marching bands and orchestras headquartered in the United States. The company was formed in 2003 by combining the Steinway properties, The Selmer Company and United Musical Instruments. It is a wholly owned subsidiary of Steinway Musical Instruments which, since 2013 has been owned by John Paulson's Paulson & Co. investment firm out of Palm Beach, Florida.

Conn-Selmer was the largest manufacturer and importer of band and orchestral instruments in the United States. The company produces a large variety of musical instruments itself and through contractors under the brand names Vincent Bach, C.G. Conn, King, Holton, Selmer, Armstrong, Leblanc, Ludwig, Musser, and Scherl & Roth. Conn-Selmer is also the North American distributor of Henri Selmer Paris woodwinds and the U.S. distributor of Yanagisawa saxophones.

== History ==
In the late nineteenth century, brothers Alexandre and Henri Selmer graduated from the Paris Conservatory as clarinetists. They were the great-grandchildren of French military drum major Johannes Jacobus Zelmer, grandchildren of Jean-Jacques Selmer, the Army Chief of Music, and two of 16 children in this musical family. At the time, musical instruments and accessories were primarily hand made, and professional musicians found it necessary to acquire skills allowing them to make their own accessories and repair and modify their own instruments. Establishing Henri Selmer & Cie. in 1885, Henri began making clarinet reeds and mouthpieces. In 1898, Henri opened a store and repair shop in Paris and began producing clarinets, and Alexandre joined the Boston Symphony Orchestra that same year.

In 1904, Selmer clarinets were presented at the Saint Louis (USA) World's Fair, winning a gold medal, and Alexandre Selmer was First Clarinetist with the Cincinnati Symphony Orchestra. Alexandre established himself in New York in 1909, opening a shop that sold Selmer clarinets and mouthpieces. The H. & A. Selmer (USA) Company grew out of that retail operation. Conn-Selmer company was preceded by the H. & A. Selmer company.

=== The H. & A. Selmer (USA) Company ===
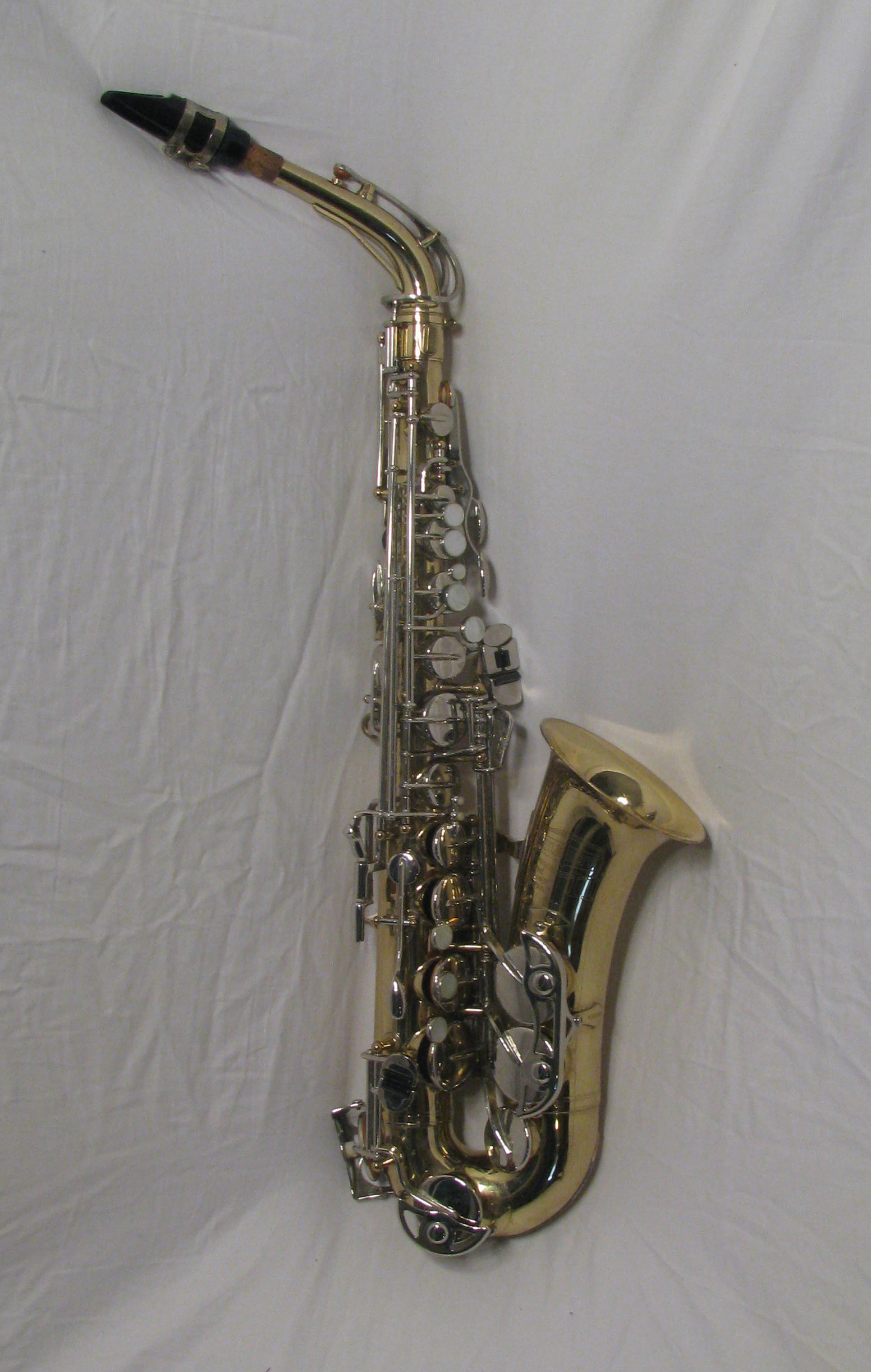
Selmer Bundy II Student Alto Saxophone

In 1910, Alexandre returned to France and the H. & A. Selmer store was managed by George Bundy. The store expanded its product line, selling "Selmer" branded wind instruments and mouthpieces from manufacturers in the US in addition to Selmer (Paris) products. In 1923, the H. & A. Selmer Company was incorporated to expand its retail operations. A 49% share was sold to C. G. Conn Ltd while Selmer (Paris) retained a minority interest. In 1927, Bundy gained full ownership, establishing independence of the company. H. & A. Selmer (USA) remained the sole importer of Selmer (Paris) products, including saxophones and brasswinds once exports of such instruments to the USA commenced.

In 1936, Selmer changed its distribution strategy, abandoning most retail and becoming a wholesaler of instruments and supplies. Selmer went on to establish itself as a leading distributor of student-grade instruments under its Bundy brand.

In response to the unavailability of Selmer (Paris) instruments after the German defeat of France in 1940, Selmer sought alternate sources for wind instruments and distributed them under their new student-line Bundy and intermediate Signet brands.

In 1950, George Bundy retired and sold his shares to partners Joseph M. Grolimund, Jack Feddersen, Milt Broadhead, and Charles Bickel.

Starting in 1952, the Selmer Artist program offered special deals for musicians who agreed to perform and record exclusively with Selmer (Paris) instruments, boosting the reputation of Selmer (Paris) instruments among aspiring professionals.

In 1958 Selmer acquired the Harry Pedler and Sons brasswind plant in Elkhart, starting in-house production of Bundy student-line brasswinds. In 1961, Selmer acquired the brasswind manufacturer Vincent Bach Corporation. Selmer moved production from Bach's Mount Vernon, New York facility to Elkhart in 1965 while retaining the premium line Bach Stradivarius. The services of Mr. Vincent Bach were retained for design of student-line brasswinds.

On February 1, 1963, Selmer acquired ownership of its main supplier of student saxophones, the Buescher Band Instrument Company. Selmer continued distributing identical Bundy and Buescher instruments until it discontinued the Buescher name in 1983.

In 1966, Selmer acquired the rights to the Brilhart line of woodwind mouthpieces, with production contracted to the Runyon Company, and the Lesher Woodwind Company, a manufacturer of oboes and bassoons.

In 1970, Selmer acquired additional production facilities from C.G. Conn, who were divesting their Elkhart, Indiana operations. In 1977, Selmer acquired the stringed instrument maker Glaesel. In 1981 Selmer acquired the Ludwig Drum Company.

The era of H. & A. Selmer as an independent company ended in 1970, with its acquisition by the electronics firm Magnavox. Magnavox was sold to Philips Electronics in 1974 and the Selmer properties were sold to the investment firm Integrated Resources in 1989. With the 1993 bankruptcy of Integrated Resources, Selmer was sold to the investment firm Kirkland Messina and reorganized as Selmer Industries, Inc., with The Selmer Company name used for its instrument manufacturing operations.

=== Recent history ===
With the backing of Kirkland Messina, Selmer Industries acquired the Steinway Musical Properties company, the parent company of piano manufacturer Steinway & Sons, in 1995 and changed their own name to Steinway Musical Instruments. The domestically produced Bundy brand was discontinued shortly afterward, replaced with student wind instruments sourced from Asia and sold as Selmer (USA) woodwinds and Bach brasswinds.

In 2000, Steinway Musical Instruments acquired United Musical Instruments (owners of Artley, Armstrong, Benge, C.G. Conn, King, Scherl & Roth), then merged it with The Selmer Company's instrument manufacturing operations to form Conn-Selmer in 2003. In 2004, Conn-Selmer acquired the Leblanc Company, gaining their exclusive distribution rights for Yanagisawa saxophones in the US and Canada. Conn-Selmer kept Leblanc in production of clarinets but ended their brasswind production in 2007, discontinuing their Martin brand and moving production of their Holton brand to Elkhart, Indiana. Conn-Selmer retains the North American importation and distribution rights for Selmer (Paris) and Yanagisawa Wind Instruments formerly held by H. & A. Selmer and Leblanc, respectively.

Conn-Selmer is the largest manufacturer and importer of band and orchestral instruments in the United States. It has manufactured instruments in six domestic facilities since 2002:

- Cleveland, Ohio
- Eastlake, Ohio (Closed)
- Elkhart, Indiana
- Kenosha, Wisconsin (closed)
- La Grange, Illinois (closed)
- Monroe, North Carolina

It has been heavily involved in outsourcing manufacturing of brands formerly associated with American manufacturers, including Ludwig drums, Glaesel, Scherl & Roth, and Wm. Lewis and Sons stringed instruments to China and Selmer (USA) wind instruments to various Asian sources.

The employees at the Vincent Bach facility in Elkhart, Indiana, represented by United Auto Workers Local 364, struck on April 1, 2006, and on July 30, 2009, the union was decertified. Of 230 workers that went on strike, approximately 70 returned, with the remaining workers subject to recall until July 30, 2010.

In 2006, calls were made for the American Federation of Musicians to boycott the entire Steinway-Conn-Selmer instrument company because it permanently replaced union workers at its manufacturing facilities.

The employees represented by United Auto Workers Local 2359 at the Eastlake, Ohio, Conn-Selmer manufacturing plant called a strike on July 26, 2011, after working without a contract since February 2011, and settled with the company on October 21, 2011.

In 2013, the Paulson & Co. investment firm acquired Steinway Musical Instruments.

In January 2026, the company informed union representatives that it would be sending most of the work at its Eastlake, Ohio, plant to China by the end of June 2026, eliminating 150 jobs and closing the plant.

== Brands ==
=== Current brands ===
- Armstrong (flutes, piccolos)
- C.G. Conn (French horns, flugelhorns, cornets, trombones, sousaphones, trumpets)
- Glaesel (violins, violas, cellos, double basses, made in China)
- Henri Selmer Paris (made in France)
- Holton (trombones, horns)
- King (Guitars, Marching brass, trombones, baritones, cornets, flugelhorns, trumpets, tubas, sousaphones)
- Leblanc (clarinets)
- Ludwig-Musser (percussion, timpani, drum sets, sub-brands made in China)
- Scherl & Roth (violins, violas, cellos, double basses, made in China)
- Selmer (USA) (saxophones, clarinets, flutes, oboes, bassoons, trumpets, trombones, baritones, tubas etc., outsourced)
- Vincent Bach (trumpets, cornets, flugelhorns, trombones)
- Wm. Lewis & Son (violins, violas, cellos, double basses, made in China)
- Yanagisawa (made in Japan)

=== Discontinued brands ===
- Artley (clarinets, flutes)
- Avanti (flutes)
- Benge (trumpets, piccolo trumpets, trombones)
- Buescher (saxophones, trumpets, mellophones...)
- Cleveland (brass instruments)
- Emerson (flutes, piccolos)
- Galway Spirit Flutes (flutes)
  - Hermann Beyer
  - Otto Bruckner
- King (saxophone line)
- Martin (trumpets and trombones)
- Noblet (clarinets)
- Vito (student brasswinds and woodwinds)
