= Vito Pascucci =

American businessman

Vito Pascucci (October 22, 1922 – August 18, 2003) was an American businessman, the CEO and co-founder (with Leon Leblanc) of G. Leblanc Corp, an American musical instrument firm based in Kenosha, Wisconsin. The firm started out as the American branch of the French G. Leblanc company.

== Career ==
Born in Kenosha on October 22, 1922, Pascucci studied trumpet as a child and became interested in instrument repair. His brother Ben owned a music store in which Vito began repairing instruments as a teenager. After being drafted in 1943 he became the repairman for an army band, the 11th AAF Band led by Mark Rubinstein. When that band was disbanded, in order to keep such prominent members from the infantry, Mr Rubinstein suggested to Glenn Miller to take many of his prime musicians. Among them was Vito. When Glenn Miller requisitioned some members of that band for his swing ensemble, they suggested he take Pascucci. Pascucci earned Miller's respect by repairing a smashed trumpet overnight with only a broomstick to work with.

Miller and Pascucci planned to run music stores together after the war, but Miller was assumed dead after a plane he was travelling in disappeared. Despite his grief, Pascucci went ahead with plans to visit instrument factories in France. Among those he saw was the factory of the G. Leblanc firm. There he was given a "duffel bag full of clarinets" and a promise that after the war he would become the company's U.S. distributor. He and Leon Leblanc formed Leblanc USA in May 1946, and within a decade the company was among the largest manufacturers of clarinets in the country.

Pascucci created the "only complete family of plastic-bodied clarinets" available in the U.S. He was also among the first instrument-makers to exploit mechanization and assembly lines in the production process. He became chairman of the American Music Conference and was inducted into the group's hall of fame in 1980. He was awarded the Edwin Franko Goldman Memorial Citation in 1982. He became president of Leblanc SNC when he bought out the French parent company in 1993.

In 1998, Pascucci was awarded an Honorary Doctorate of Music from Berklee College of Music.

Pascucci died of kidney failure on August 18, 2003, in Kenosha.
