= Saxophone technique =

Physical means of playing the saxophone

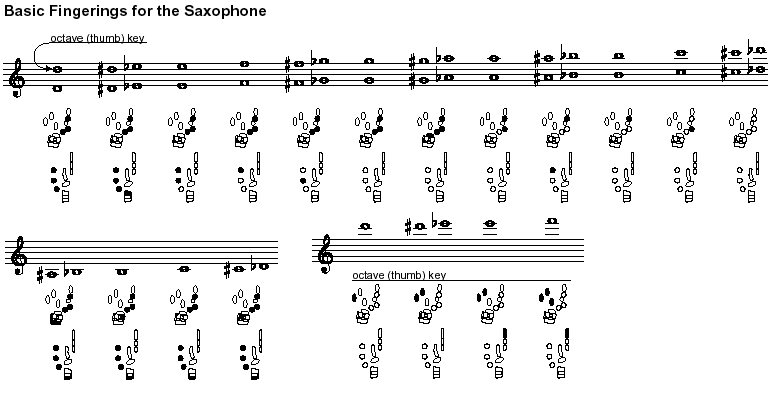
The fingerings for a saxophone do not change from one instrument to another. Here, notes on a treble staff correspond to fingerings below.

Saxophone technique refers to the physical means of playing the saxophone. It includes how to hold the instrument, how the embouchure is formed and the airstream produced, tone production, hands and fingering positions, and a number of other aspects. Instrumental technique and corresponding pedagogy is a topic of much interest to musicians and teachers and therefore has been subjected to personal opinions and differences in approach. Over the course of the saxophone's performance history, notable saxophonists have contributed much to the literature on saxophone technique.

== Embouchure ==
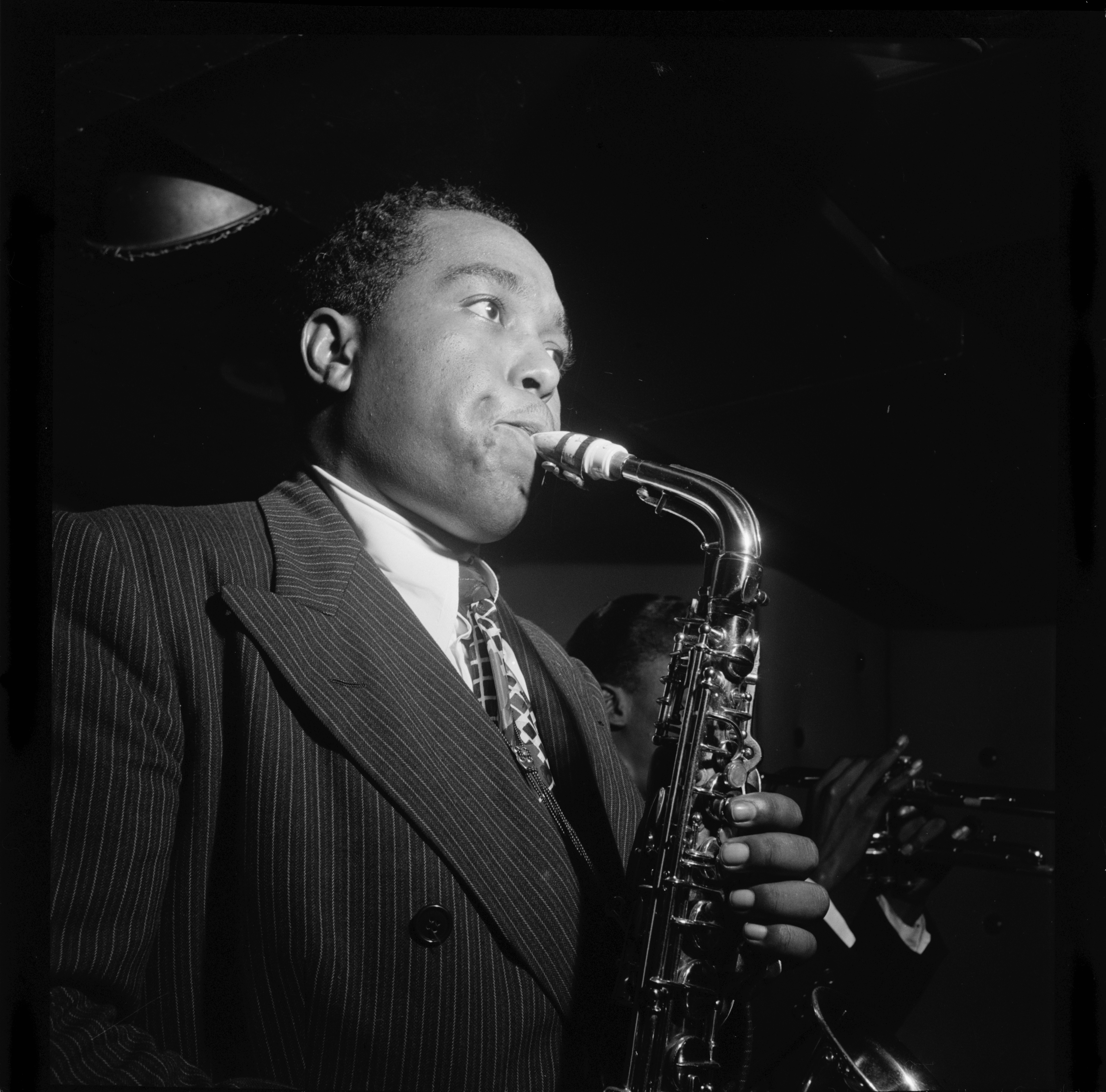
A photo of jazz saxophonist Charlie Parker playing the saxophone. Note his embouchure and posture.

Saxophone embouchure is the position of the facial muscles and shaping of the lips to the mouthpiece when playing a saxophone.

Playing technique for the saxophone can derive from an intended style (classical, jazz, rock, funk, etc.) and the player's idealized sound. The design of the saxophone allows for a wide variety of different approaches to sound production. However, there is a basic underlying structure to most techniques.

The most common saxophone embouchures in modern music use are variants of the single-lip embouchure, in which the mouthpiece position is stabilized with firm pressure from the upper teeth resting on the mouthpiece (sometimes padded with a thin strip of rubber known as a "bite-pad" or "mouthpiece-patch"). The lower lip is supported by the buccinator and chin muscles and rests in contact with the lower teeth, making contact with the reed. The mouthpiece is inserted at least to the break of the facing curve (the beginning of the curve from the plane of the table to the aperture, or tip opening), but generally with the beak not taken more than halfway into the player's mouth. Specific aspects of single-lip embouchure technique are described in seminal works by Larry Teal and Joseph Allard. Santy Runyon was another influential educator on modern embouchure technique, having instructed many of the top saxophonists of the big band era and top jazz musicians including Charlie Parker, Paul Desmond, Harry Carney, Lee Konitz, and Sonny Stitt.

=== Individual approaches by notable pedagogues ===
Many saxophonists and pedagogues have published material on the saxophone embouchure and tone production. Two of the works most influential on modern teaching were published by Joe Allard and Larry Teal.

==== Joe Allard ====
Allard taught that the embouchure must conform to the mouthpiece. Frequently citing anatomy, Allard depicted that when the skull comes down, the larynx and the throat are constricted. He had his students think of keeping their heads straight when they played. Allard also recommended that saxophonists use very little pressure from the top teeth and lip and just let everything rest naturally. Allard described the proper lower lip position as slightly drawn in to rest against the lower teeth, as in pronouncing the letter "V," to cushion the reed without excessively dampening vibration. Pressure from the reed slightly spreads the relaxed lip, with the inner part slightly over the tops of the teeth and the outer part slightly protruding. Allard emphasized the role of jaw pressure in maintaining control of the reed, with slightly increased lip pressure toward the center of the reed optimal for tonal richness, and tongue position in controlling airflow (the soft "kihhhh"). Often quoting Douglas Stanly's "The Science of Voice," he said that keeping an open throat and a relaxed throat are contradictory. The summary of Allard's approach to saxophone is to keep everything as natural as possible being careful not to interfere with head position, tongue position, breathing, or embouchure.

==== Larry Teal ====
Teal's The Art of Saxophone Playing has also been an influential work in modern saxophone embouchure technique. Teal placed relatively greater emphasis on lip tension in forming the "drawstring" or "ooo" embouchure with a good seal at the corners of the mouth for maintaining tonal control. Teal's concepts are influential in developing technique for subtoning.

The Teal and Allard works are complementary in describing different aspects of modern saxophone embouchure. Allard's approach is detailed on mechanics, while Teal's is more about feel and concept. There is no "Allard School" or "Teal School" of embouchure, as teachers mix and match concepts from both sources to achieve the best result in individual situations. In historical context, Allard and Teal presented their works at a time when the legacy of clarinet-derived embouchure teaching for saxophonists was still strong, although performance technique was rapidly expanding to realize the full tonal and dynamic potential of the instrument. They codified the new techniques being developed by their contemporaries such as Santy Runyon.

=== Alternate embouchure styles ===
The "clarinet-style" embouchure is a variation of the single-lip embouchure with the lower lip rolled over the teeth and the corners of the mouth drawn back. It was regarded as standard technique into the first half of the Twentieth Century, when reed instrument pedagogy was geared almost entirely to the clarinet and saxophone specialists were rare. It is still sometimes used with the alto and smaller saxophones, particularly in classical technique. It is sometimes used for subtoning, in the technique of tenor saxophonist Stan Getz "switched on" by thrusting the jaw forward and drawing the corners of the mouth back. The clarinet and tenor saxophone player Jimmy Giuffre used a clarinet-style embouchure with a tenor saxophone with a specially-modified neck. It is still commonly, and controversially, taught to beginning students as a shortcut to a passable result in lieu of more sustained effort developing embouchure strength and technique.

The double-lip embouchure involves curving the upper lip under the upper teeth, so that the lip comes between the upper teeth and the beak of the mouthpiece; and curving the lower lip over the top of the lower teeth, so that it comes between the lower teeth and the reed. It was an accepted technique during the earliest days of the saxophone but is no longer in common use. It gained some currency as a technique when tenor saxophonist John Coltrane used it to mitigate tooth pain while playing.

The "curved out double-lip no teeth embouchure", known by an even smaller number of saxophone players, involves taking the bottom lip and curving it out so that only a small part touches the teeth; resting just your lip on the top curved out, but with no teeth touching the mouthpiece; and putting your lips as far onto the mouthpiece as the reed and mouthpiece are still separated.

== Tone ==
Tone refers to characteristics of the actual sound the saxophone produces. A player's "tonal concept" is the sound that they wish to create.

The tone produced is influenced by several factors:

- The pressure and speed of the air stream and air support.
- The position of the player's trachea, throat and oral cavity
- The player's embouchure
- The design of the mouthpiece (chamber, facing, tip opening) and reed strength
- The design of the instrument, perhaps including the material of which it is made (e.g. brass or other metal, lacquer)
- The note being played and the acoustic properties of that note. Some notes of the same pitch will vary in tone depending on the fingering used.
- Dynamic (volume of sound)
- Any advanced tonal effects employed by the saxophonist including growling, subtone, flutter tonguing, etc.

== Vibrato ==
Saxophone vibrato is much like a vocal or string vibrato, except the pitch variations are made using the jaw instead of the player's fingers or breathing organs. The jaw motions required for vibrato can be simulated by saying the syllables "wah-wah-wah" or "tai-yai-yai." Classical vibrato can vary between players (soft and subtle, wide and abrasive, or a combination thereof). Many classical players look to violinists as the models for their sound. It has been suggested that this follows the example of Marcel Mule of the Paris Conservatory, one of the early proponents of classical saxophone playing. Sigurd Rascher, an important German saxophone player, was known for the quicker style of vibrato which was opposite to Marcel Mule's. Jazz vibrato varies even more amongst players. Fast and wide vibrato is used by Swing music players, while some modern jazz saxophonists use almost no vibrato except in slow ballads. Typically, less vibrato is used at faster tempos.

Players just starting out with vibrato will usually start out slow with exaggerated jaw movements. As they progress, the vibrato becomes quicker until the desired speed is reached. Vibrato can also be produced by controlling the air stream with the tongue. Techniques alternative to jaw vibrato can be used to achieve a beautiful tone quality, but can also diverge noticeably from tone quality produced by classical jaw vibrato.

The lip vibrato, which is often confused with the jaw vibrato, is produced by moving the lips in something like a “wa-wa-wa---” motion. However, this is more difficult to control, as it causes a greater disturbance to the basic embouchure. This type of pulsation tends to dominate the tone so much than the listener hears more vibrato than tone.

The throat vibrato, which is seldom used any more, was at one time prevalent in wind instrument performance, especially among brass players. This is a type of “spasm” generated by tensing the throat muscles, and results in a sort of “quiver.” This vibrato has at various times been described disparagingly as the “whinny” or the “nanny-goat” type.

The diaphragm vibrato, sometimes called "breath vibrato", is predominantly an intensity vibrato. It is induced by a changing of the rate of the air pressure on the reed, and accomplished by moving the abdominal muscles, which in turn put pressure on the diaphragm, much as one would say “huh-huh-huh---.” This vibrato has proved to be quite satisfactory in a few cases, but its use is restricted, since it is difficult to attain a sensitive control of either the rate or the amplitude.

== Extended techniques ==
This list applies to techniques outside the basic ability to comfortably and easily play the saxophone. They would usually be learnt only after mastery of the basics and employed for unorthodox musical vocabulary.

- Growling is a technique used whereby the saxophonist sings, hums, or growls, using the back of the throat while playing. This causes a modulation of the sound, and results in a gruffness or coarseness of the sound. It is rarely found in classical or band music, but is often utilized in jazz, blues, rock 'n' roll, and other popular genres. Some notable musicians who utilized this technique are Earl Bostic, Boots Randolph, Gato Barbieri, Ben Webster, Clarence Clemons, Nelson Rangell, David Sanborn, Greg Ham, Hank Carter, Bobby Keys, Keith Crossan, and King Curtis.
- Glissando is a pitch technique where the saxophonist bends the pitch of the note using voicing (tongue and embouchure placement) to move to another fingered note. Johnny Hodges was particularly noted for his mastery of this technique. A more modern expert of the saxophone glissando is Phil Woods who can play a fluid glissando across the entire range of the horn.
- Multiphonics is the technique of playing more than one note at once. A special fingering combination causes the instrument to vibrate at two different pitches alternately, creating a warbling sound. A similar effect can also be created by 'humming' while playing a note.
- The use of overtones involves fingering one note but altering the air stream to produce another note which is an overtone of the fingered note. For example, if low B♭ is fingered, a B♭ one octave above may be sounded by manipulating the air stream. Other overtones that can be obtained with this fingering include F, B♭, and D. The practice of overtones is often used as a preliminary exercise for students learning to produce notes above high F# (the "altissimo register").
- The technique of manipulating the air stream to obtain various effects is commonly known as "voicing." Voicing technique involves varying the position of the tongue and throat, causing the same amount of air to pass through either a more or less confined oral cavity. This causes the air stream to either speed up or slow down, respectively. As well as allowing the saxophonist to play overtones/altissimo with ease, and to correct the intonation of each note, proper voicing also helps the saxophonist develop a clear, even and focused sound throughout the range of the instrument. For a thorough discussion of voicing technique see "Voicing" by Donald Sinta and Denise Dabney.
- Slap tonguing creates a "popping" or percussive sound. A slap may be notated either pitched, or non-pitched. Pitched slaps are also called "closed" slaps (referring to the mouth on the mouthpiece) and result in a tone identical to the fingered pitch. A non-pitched slap is also called an "open" slap, because the saxophonist must remove his or her mouth from the reed. It results in a more violent "thwack" sound. The amount of air that a saxophonist uses affects only the volume of the slap. The sound of the slap in both the open and closed varieties is created by the reed rebounding and striking the mouthpiece.
- Flutter-tonguing can give a rolling R sound with the tone played.
- Altissimo is a technique to play the notes that are over the normal saxophone note range. Players may play the notes that are higher than F sharp, which is the highest normal note. Players need to know how to overblow.
- Overblow is a technique used while playing a wind instrument which, primarily through manipulation of the supplied air (versus, e.g., a fingering change or operation of a slide), causes the sounded pitch to jump to a higher one.
- Circular Breath is a technique that can let players produce a continuous tone without interruption. This is accomplished by breathing in through the nose while simultaneously pushing air out through the mouth using air stored in the cheeks.
- Breathy Tone is a technique of playing a special sound. Players should bite the mouthpiece less, and relax embouchure. Players should not use teeth to give pressure, only use lower lips' strength. If playing successfully, there should be a breathy wind sound when playing notes.
- Double and Triple Tonguing is a technique that involves the tip and back of the tongue. The technique involves emulating the sounds "ta-ca" or "ti-gui", both of which employ the tip and back of the tongue. This allows the player to tongue-articulate at twice the speed that the single-tonguing technique allows.

== Electronic effects ==
The use of electronic effects with the saxophone began with innovations such as the Varitone system, which Selmer introduced in 1965. The Varitone included a small microphone mounted on the saxophone neck, a set of controls attached to the saxophone's body, and an amplifier and loudspeaker mounted inside a cabinet. The Varitone's effects included echo, tremolo, tone control, and an octave divider. Two notable Varitone players were Eddie Harris and Sonny Stitt. Similar products included the Hammond Condor.

In addition to playing the Varitone, Eddie Harris experimented with looping techniques on his 1968 album Silver Cycles.

David Sanborn and Traffic member Chris Wood employed effects such as wah-wah and delay on various recordings during the 1970s.

In more recent years, the term "saxophonics" has been used to describe the use of these techniques by saxophonists such as Skerik, who has used a wide variety of effects that are often associated with the electric guitar, and Jeff Coffin, who has made notable use of an envelope follower.

== See also ==
- Saxophone
- Embouchure
- Saxophone mouthpieces
- List of woodwind instruments
- Lindeman-Sobel approach to artistic wind performance
