= Linderman =

Linderman is a surname. Notable people with the surname include:

== People ==
- Fannie B. Linderman (1875-1960), British-born American teacher, entertainer, and writer
- Frank Bird Linderman (1869-1938), Montana writer, Native American ally and ethnographer
- Henry Linderman (1825–1879), American financier
- Rodney Anonymous' lesser known real surname
- Vladimir Linderman (1958), a Latvian and Russian publicist and political dissident

== In fiction ==
- Mr. Daniel Linderman, fictional character on the television series Heroes

== See also ==
- Lindemann
- Linderman Lake
