= Single-lip embouchure =

Woodwind technique

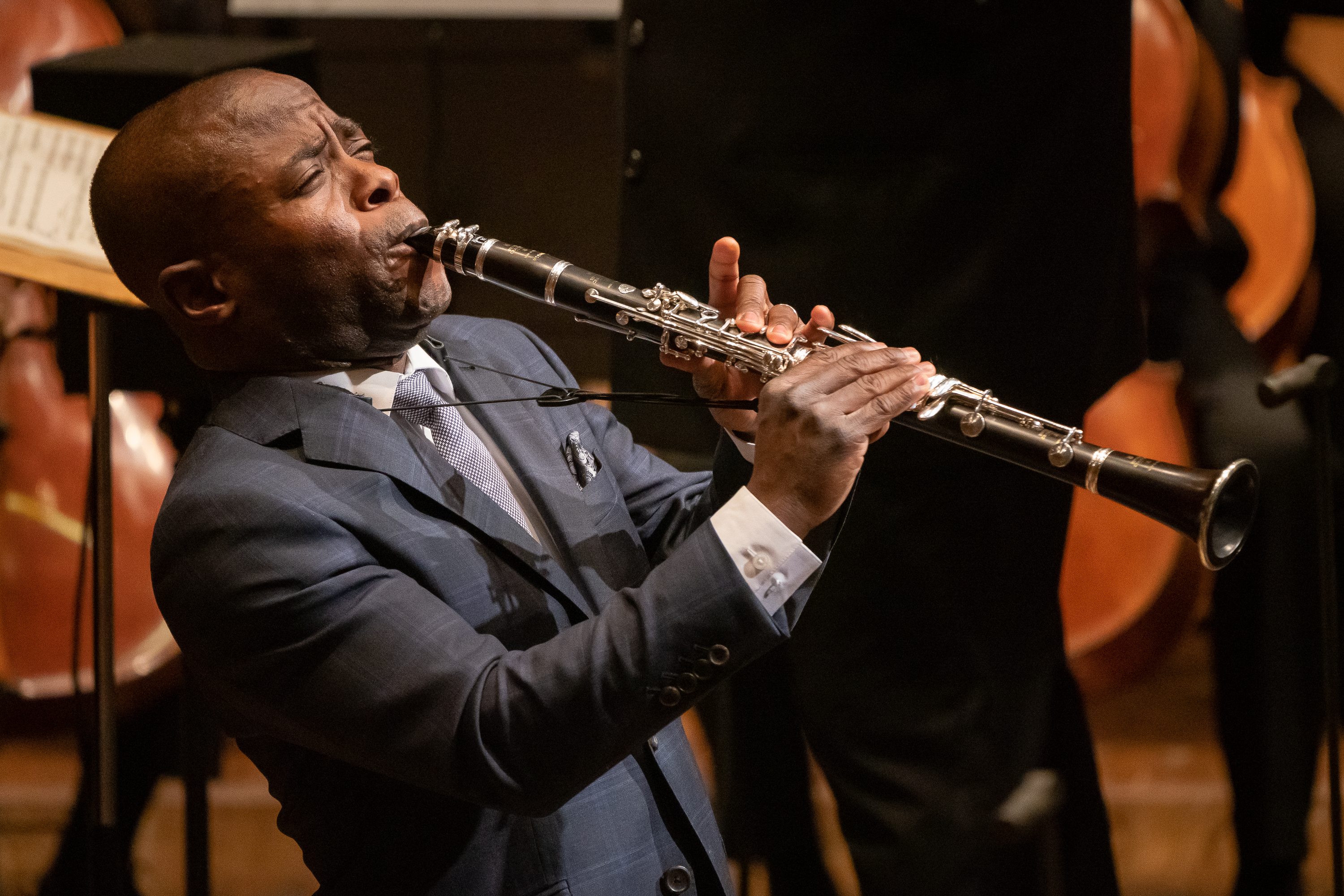
A close-up of New York Philharmonic principal clarinetist Anthony McGill, detailing the single-lip embouchure.

The single-lip embouchure is a type of embouchure used to play the clarinet and saxophone, among other woodwind instruments. It is characterized by the placement of teeth and lips: the bottom lip covers the bottom teeth, while the top teeth are placed directly on the instrument's mouthpiece. It contrasts with the double-lip embouchure, which was historically more common but is now a less popular approach.
