= Lindemann =

Lindemann is a German surname.

== Persons ==
Notable people with the surname include:

=== Arts and entertainment ===
- Elisabeth Lindemann, German textile designer and weaver
- Jens Lindemann, trumpet player
- Julie Lindemann, American photographer
- Maggie Lindemann, American singer
- Till Lindemann, singer, Rammstein
  - Lindemann (band), his side project

=== Sports ===
- Hannes Lindemann, solo canoeist
- Hermann Lindemann, German football player and manager
- Paul Lindemann, American basketball player
- Stefan Lindemann, German figure skater
- Laura Lindemann, German triathlete

=== Government and military ===
- Ernst Lindemann (1894–1941), captain of the German battleship Bismarck
- Ernst Heinrich Lindemann (1833–1900), German politician
- Fritz Lindemann (1894–1944), German artillery officer and member of the resistance to Adolf Hitler
- Gerhard Lindemann (1896–1994), German Generalmajor
- Georg Lindemann (1884–1963), German cavalry officer
- Rosa Lindemann (1876–1958), German communist in the resistance to Nazism

=== Others ===
- Albert Lindemann, American historian
- Carl Louis Ferdinand von Lindemann, mathematician
- Erich Lindemann, German-American author and psychiatrist
- Erich Lindemann (botanist), German botanist
- Frederick Lindemann, 1st Viscount Cherwell, English physicist, and Churchill's scientific advisor during World War II
- Adolph Friedrich Lindemann, his father; engineer, businessman and amateur astronomer
- George Lindemann, American businessman
- Karl Lindemann (1844–1929), Russian-German entomologist
- Margarethe Lindemann, mother of the theologian, Martin Luther

== See also ==
- Lindemann mechanism (due to Frederick Lindemann)
- Lindeman
- Linderman
- Lindenbaum
