= Lindeman =

Lindeman is a German, Dutch, Norwegian and Swedish surname.

== Geographical distribution ==
As of 2014, 58.8% of all known bearers of the surname Lindeman were residents of the United States (frequency 1:55,620), 16.5% of the Netherlands (1:9,286), 7.6% of Finland (1:6,521), 3.5% of Australia (1:61,911), 3.0% of Sweden (1:29,570), 2.1% of Russia (1:621,945) and 1.9% of Canada (1:176,067).

In Finland, the frequency of the surname was higher than national average (1:6,521) in the following regions:

1. Åland (1:1,009)
2. Central Finland (1:2,029)
3. Southwest Finland (1:3,518)
4. Päijänne Tavastia (1:4,148)
5. Pirkanmaa (1:4,156)
6. Kainuu (1:5,120)
7. Ostrobothnia (1:5,607)
8. Kymenlaakso (1:6,104)
9. Tavastia Proper (1:6,190)

In the Netherlands, the frequency of the surname was higher than national average (1:9,286) in the following provinces:

1. Groningen (1:4,317)
2. Drenthe (1:6,121)
3. Utrecht (1:6,514)
4. North Holland (1:6,629)
5. Flevoland (1:6,662)
6. South Holland (1:8,411)

In Sweden, the frequency of the surname was higher than national average (1:29,570) in the following counties:

1. Västmanland County (1:7,860)
2. Örebro County (1:10,186)
3. Södermanland County (1:10,341)
4. Norrbotten County (1:20,901)
5. Östergötland County (1:23,031)
6. Västernorrland County (1:24,396)
7. Värmland County (1:25,221)
8. Stockholm County (1:28,045)
9. Uppsala County (1:29,147)

== People ==
- Bert-Jan Lindeman (b. 1989), Dutch road bicycle racer
- Eduard C. Lindeman (1885–1953), American educator
- Fredrik Otto Lindeman (b. 1936), Norwegian linguist, Lindeman's law
- Henry Lindeman (1902–1961), American woodwind player, Lindeman-Sobel approach
- Jan Christiaan Lindeman (1921–2007), Dutch botanist
- Jim Lindeman (b. 1962), American baseball player
- Kurt Lindeman (b. 1932), Finnish fencer
- Lars Lindeman (1920–2006), Finnish politician
- Ludvig Mathias Lindeman (1812–1887), Norwegian composer and organist
- Ole Andreas Lindeman (1769–1857), Norwegian organist and music teacher
- Osmo Lindeman (1929–1987), Finnish composer and pedagogue
- Peter Brynie Lindeman (1858–1930), Norwegian organist, composer, and cellist
- Raymond Lindeman (1915–1942), American ecologist
- Tamara Lindeman (b. 1984), Canadian actress and musician
- Trygve Lindeman (1896–1979), Norwegian cellist and conservatory director
- William Lindeman (1794–1875), German piano manufacturer

== Places ==
- The Lindeman Islands, part of the Whitsunday Islands. These include Lindeman Island, and form Lindeman Islands National Park
- Lindeman, a Klondike Gold Rush era settlement along Lindeman Lake (Chilkoot Trail) in British Columbia, Canada
- Lindeman Fjord, Greenland

== Other ==
- Lindeman (characters), created by Hasse Alfredson
- Lindemans Brewery, maker of Lambic beer

== See also ==
- Lindeman Lake (disambiguation)
- Lindemann
- Lindemans
