= Gaston Hamelin =

French clarinetist and teacher

Gaston Hamelin (27 May 1884 – 8 September 1951) was a French clarinetist and teacher.

Born in Saint-Georges-sur-Baulche, Hamelin won the first prize for clarinet at the Paris Conservatory in 1904 under professor Charles Turban. He was a noted soloist, becoming the first to perform the Première rhapsodie for clarinet by Claude Debussy in 1919; he is also believed to be the first to record that work. Hamelin moved to the United States in 1926 to assume the seat of principal clarinetist for the Boston Symphony Orchestra. He performed with that group from 1926 to 1932, but was reportedly not offered a contract renewal because conductor Serge Koussevitzky disapproved of his practice of playing on a metal Selmer instrument instead of one made of the more traditional grenadilla wood. One anecdote about his dismissal records that he responded to praise on his performance in a rehearsal by waving his instrument in the air, which "enraged" Koussevitzky.

In the early 1930s Hamelin returned to France, where he was active as a soloist and private teacher. He published his Scale and Exercise Book in Paris. His pedagogical approach was notable for advocating a double-lip embouchure, which was less common than the single-lip variety but was credited with reduced biting and increased fluidity of tone. His students included Rosario Mazzeo, Joseph Allard and Ralph McLane. He is known as a founder of the "American" school of clarinet and is credited with having a significant influence on the development of performance practice in the United States.

His son Armand Hamelin, born 1907, played bass clarinet in the Boston Symphony for the last two years of his father's tenure there.
