= Lindeman-Sobel approach to artistic wind performance =

The Lindeman-Sobel Approach to Artistic Wind Performance is a comprehensive method in music that aims to harmonize various elements of wind instrument playing. This includes the coordination of fingers, air stream (or bow usage for string instruments), rhythm, and the physical attributes of the instrument, such as the length of the tube or string being played.

This approach was initially developed by Henry Lindeman (July 28, 1902 – March 7, 1961). He was an American woodwind musician known for his association with the Paul Whiteman Orchestra. It was later refined and expanded by Phil Sobel (May 13, 1917 – September 14, 2008), a prominent first chair woodwind player in the NBC staff orchestra and the leader of the West Coast Saxophone Quartet. Sobel, who studied under Lindeman from 1935 to 1946, played a significant role in advancing and popularizing this method.

== Summary ==
According to the Lindeman-Sobel Approach music is sound in motion and that sound is created when the air stream (or bow) meets the fingers. The Lindeman-Sobel Approach seeks to create an awareness in the individual of how their sound is being played rhythmically relative to the resistance of the tube length and the notes on the page.

== Motion and rhythm ==
A fundamental tenet of the Lindeman-Sobel Approach is that the general tendency among musicians is to hold long notes too long and make short notes too short.

"When you hold a note too long, it causes you to miss your next entrance, and consequently, you may rush to make up for the lost time. Music is made up of entrances. If you are constantly in motion, you won't miss your entrances and you won't have to rush to make up for the lost time. Most musicians are constantly rushing because they are constantly late. We put weight on the wrong notes.....We play the long notes too long and the short notes too short." – Phil Sobel – March 1999.

The Lindeman-Sobel Approach also emphasizes building an awareness of note groupings by placing greater weight on the downbeats of each grouping.

"It's not about keeping up with the metronome (or the beat), it's about playing the correct mathematical combinations and always moving forward and going somewhere!" – Phil Sobel, March 1999.

== Fingers ==
Being in touch with the fingers and aware of our fingers can have a significant impact on the sound. If we lose this awareness of the fingers then we become disconnected from the instrument and the sound suffers.

Phil Sobel said, speaking about great saxophonists "they all have great fingers. Fingers that are intimate with the instrument. Fingers that barely move and are always in touch with the horn. What did they know that most saxophonists do not? That the speed at which you put down or pick up a finger affects the sound and the pitch of the note. The distance from an open saxophone key to a closed key is very minimal, so any extra distance, i.e. starting with the finger above the key but not yet on the key is a waste of motion. The opposite is true also, that in opening a key if you actually lift your finger off of the key and come out of contact with the instrument, you have now wasted energy and motion in two directions because now you will have to get back down on the key to play it again. It is impossible not to see how much motion most saxophonists waste because they don't pay enough attention to their fingers."

== Timbre ==
Timbre is viewed as a combination of sound and pitch. This is because if a note is out of tune it will not have a great sound. Rhythm is the glue that holds the sound together. Without rhythm to coordinate the air, tongue, embouchure, slide, fingers, bow, etc. the sound will not resonate at its full potential. The Lindeman-Sobel Approach also emphasizes an awareness of the resistances that occur naturally within the instrument and how those relate to where you are on the instrument and where you are going.

== See also ==
- Saxophone technique
- Rhythm
- Fingering
- Timbre
- Music education
