= Clint McLaughlin =

American trumpeter (born 1957)

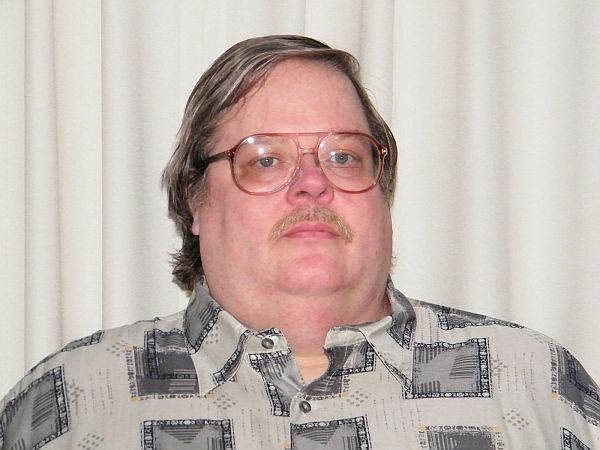
- McLaughlin 2012
- Born: 1957 (age 68–69); Tyler, Texas
- Occupations: Author, teacher, trumpeter
- Years active: 1976–present
- Spouse(s): Jan McLaughlin, married 1982
- Children: David McLaughlin, Robert McLaughlin and Rebekka McKnight
- Website: bbtrumpet.com

Clint "Pops" McLaughlin (born October 21, 1957) is an American trumpet player, teacher and writer. He has two degrees in music by the Texas Tech and The University of Texas System. He was taught mainly by trumpet player Don Jacoby.

Clint has written over 25 books on trumpet, embouchure and brass music and has articles on those topics in the International Trumpet Guild Journal "Windplayer Magazine" and others.

He was included in the book Trumpet Greats, as one of the most influential people in the trumpet world from 1600 to date. He was also quoted and mentioned several times in the book "Trumpet Pedagogy" written by David Hickman.

As a teacher he has taught and influenced players including Keith Fiala, Mark Curry, Eric Bolvin, Herb Alpert, Bill Churchville, Kiku Collins, Mic Gillette, George Graham, Jeff Helgesen, David Hickman, Bill Knevitt, Roddy Lewis, Jim Manley, Rex Merriweather, Matt Von Roderick, Eddie Severn and Andrea Tofanelli.

Pops has donated many books to music programs and College Libraries around the world. Pops also wrote and donated 2 books to the Brass For Africa Charity for them to distribute freely through the Continent.

== Embouchure ==
Clint's studies are specialized on trumpet and brass embouchure, he was the first person to explain the "Aperture Tunnel". In his book "How the Chops Work" Clint explains how the vibrations affect the pitch; arguing that not only the length, but also the thickness and height affect it. Mr. McLaughlin also explains how adjusting the aperture tunnel when playing can increase a players resonance by strengthening higher harmonics in the vibration.

Mr. McLaughlin was the first person to explain the 3 different types of tongue arch and what each type does and doesn't do for brass playing in his book "Tongue Arch and Aperture Tunnel" (2012).

McLaughlin has been active in describing which facial muscles help and which hinder trumpet playing.

Other topics in his books are how facial tension adversely affects lip vibrations and playing and he has helped explain the differences in high note playing using different breathing techniques and anchor tonguing.

Clint was the first teacher to explain how the order in which embouchure motions are used affects the players range and endurance. Clint discovered that some embouchure techniques like tongue arch work best in the middle register, some like lip compression work best in the upper register. Making sure to add the elements of embouchure control in the right order is a key of successful playing. He calls this idea the 4 Trumpet Octave Keys.

== Thermal imaging videos ==
Clint McLaughlin did the first ever thermal imaging video of trumpet players. The videos show the heat gain in the muscles as the player plays different notes. You see the actual heat changes in muscle activity, while hearing the note that caused the heat change. A few of these videos can be found at this website Thermal video study of trumpet players.

== Trumpet high notes ==
McLaughlin did a major rewrite and update on the 160 year old Arban book. He took exercises and raised them a step at a time, giving serious material to practice range work with. The book is 985 pages and is considered to be a major addition to trumpet literature by world class player Mark Curry.

== Other books ==
McLaughlin started studying martial arts when he was 10 and trained in 8 styles. He taught martial arts in a large gym with over 1200 students for several years before he wrote his self-defense book.

In 2000 McLaughlin started to study theology and relationship counseling and became ordained in 2006. He does work with couples to improve their relationships.

Writing books on marriage counseling, dating advice and gay rights became a part of his Christian outreach.

== Bibliography ==
- Self Defense: Easy Self Defense Moves That Could Save Your Life (1986, 2010)
- The No Nonsense Trumpet From A-Z (1995)
- Trumpet FAQs (1998)
- The Next Level (1999)
- Air on the Move (2001)
- The Pros Talk Embouchure (2002)
- How the Chops Work (2002)
- Chops Builder (2003)
- Get a Gig (2004)
- 30 Minutes A Day (2004)
- 6 hour Learning Audio (2005)
- 5 Sleep Learning Audio Subliminals (2005)
- More Power More Range (2009)
- Self Help Marriage: How To Put A Marriage Back On Track (2010)
- Don't Gamble With Dating: Get Better Game (2011)
- Be Your Own Teacher Video (2011)
- No Nonsense Improv Video (2011)
- Lip Curl Embouchure Video (2011)
- AIS (2011)
- Curious Things: That People Do (2012)
- Gay In America: Punishment 24/7 Without A Trial (2012)
- Write On: How To Write and Publish A Book (2012)
- Tongue Arch and Aperture Tunnel (2012)
- The New (Expanded Range) Arban Book (2012)
- Why Atlas Shrugged? (2013)
- High Gear/Low Gear (2013)
- Tensionless Playing (2013)
- New Expanded Range Clarke Technical Studies Book (2013)
- The 4 Trumpet Octave Keys (2014)
- Mouthpieces: What Will It Sound Like? (2015)
- Trumpet Range Pyramid (2015)
- Brass For Africa: Learning to Play the Trumpet: A Textbook (2016)
- Brass For Africa: Pops' Daily Trumpet Practice Music (2016)
- Trumpet Concerto Key and Range Study (2016)
- Play The Trumpet; Don't Play With It. The Key Is How You Think. (2017)
- How to Play Pedals and Keep Your Lip Setpoint (2018)
