= Lee Bracegirdle =

Australian-American musician

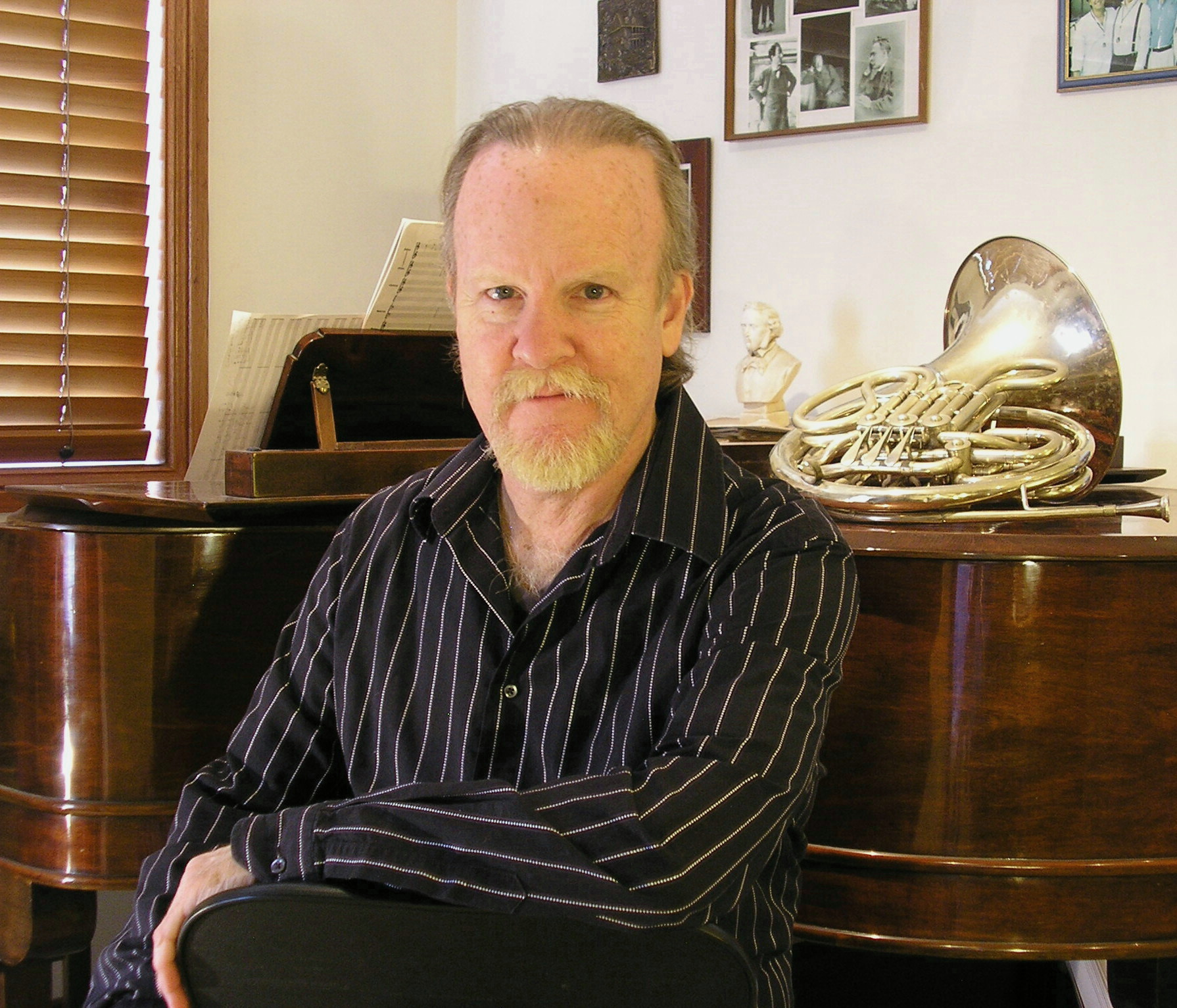
Lee Bracegirdle, 2013

Lee Joseph Bracegirdle (born 1952) is an Australian-American composer, horn player and conductor.

He was born in Houston, Texas, US, and grew up in Bucks County, near Philadelphia, Pennsylvania. He resides in Sydney, Australia and his compositions are published by C.F. Peters.

After studies in French horn at the Philadelphia Musical Academy with Joseph DeAngelis, he studied at the Juilliard School with James Chambers and John Cerminaro, and privately with Carmine Caruso and Roy Stevens.

In New York he free-lanced with the New York City Symphony Orchestra, the Brooklyn Philharmonia, and with jazz musicians Clark Terry, Ornette Coleman, Stanley Clarke, Teo Macero and Dave Brubeck.

His principal horn positions included México's Orquesta Filarmónica de la UNAM (OFUNAM), the Chamber Orchestra of México City, and the Hof Symphony Orchestra (Hofer Symphoniker) (1977–1980), where he co-founded the quintet Rekkenze Brass. In 1980 he became associate principal horn with the Sydney Symphony Orchestra, where he worked until his retirement in 2012. His recordings made through the Australian Broadcasting Corporation include the sonatas of Paul Hindemith. In 1981 he co-founded the Australian Brass Quintet.

He wrote and edited horn etudes for the International Music Company and 3-C Musikverlag, and has hosted master classes at the Salzburg Mozarteum, the Juilliard School, the Curtis Institute, the University of Illinois, the Chopin University of Music (Warsaw), and the Conservatorio Esteban Salas (Santiago de Cuba).

He studied conducting with Michael Gielen and Jorge Rotter at the Salzburg Mozarteum, and made his conducting debut in 1991 with the Orchestra of the Mozarteum. Since 1996 he has been musical director and composer-in-residence of the Australian Chamber Ballet.

He began composing orchestral music in the late 1990s, many of his works being commissioned by the Sydney Symphony Orchestra and the American Wind Symphony Orchestra. He holds an honorary diploma from the Kodaly Academy in Chicago, and has been composer-in-residence at Bundanon (Australia) and the Brahmshaus (Baden-Baden).

Major compositions:

- Divertimento for Orchestra (1998)
- Variations for Orchestra (2000), (C.F. Peters, catalogue #EP68263R)
- Eat Pianist (ballet) (2002)
- Prometheus and Pandora (ballet) (2003)
- Ammerseelieder (2005), (C.F. Peters, catalogue #EP68264R)
- Threnos (2007), (C.F. Peters, catalogue #EP68187)
- Euphonium Concerto (2007), (C.F. Peters, catalogue #EP68262-S)
- Landscape Visions (2010)
- Passacaglia and Gigues (2011)
- Legends of the Old Castle (2012), (C.F. Peters, catalogue #EP68414R)
- Violin Concerto (2012) (C.F. Peters catalogue #EP68625)
- Shoalhaven-Lieder (2018)
- Triptych for saxophone and orchestra (2017)
- Clarinet Concerto (2021)
- Viola Concerto (2025)
