= Lindeman Lake =

Lindeman Lake may refer to several places:

- Lindeman Lake (Chilkoot Trail), a lake in northwestern British Columbia
- Lindeman Lake (Chilliwack), a lake in Chilliwack Lake Provincial Park, British Columbia

== See also ==
- Lindeman
