= Embouchure collapse =

Condition affecting wind instrument players

Embouchure collapse, "blowing one's chops" is a generic term used by wind instrument players to describe a variety of conditions which result in the inability of the embouchure to function. The embouchure is the purposeful arrangement of the facial muscles and lips to produce a sound on a wind or brass instrument. In brass playing, it involves vibration of the membrane area of the lips.

Embouchure collapse in its various forms and extremities generally results in difficulty in playing for extended periods (especially if playing loudly and/or in the high register) or a complete inability to play. The former applies mainly in less severe cases; the latter in the most severe cases.

== Causes ==
There are a variety of causes for embouchure collapse, mainly focal dystonia or Embouchure Overuse Syndrome; also, the topic of mouthpiece pressure (whether or not excessive pressure is damaging to the embouchure) is hotly debated by brass players.

== Focal dystonia ==
Dystonia is a neurological disease affecting the brain's ability to fire neurons (which control muscle movement) correctly. Focal dystonia specifically affects one particular area of the body and is usually completely isolated, affecting only one activity. The disease renders the sufferer unable to control the muscles in the affected area.

The presence of this condition in a brass player's facial muscles results in an inability to form an embouchure because of the individual's loss of control over the relevant muscles. Because the condition is neurological, there is, in terms of brass playing at least, no effective cure. Treatments using botox have been pioneered to treat focal dystonia in other parts of the body; however, they are ineffective in treating embouchure collapse. This is possibly because botox causes the facial muscles to relax; and although this collapse lessens the uncontrollable twitching of the muscles, the newly relaxed status deprives the player of the lip flexibility needed to play a brass instrument. For most brass players, diagnosis with focal dystonia signals the end of their careers.

== Embouchure overuse syndrome ==
This is a far more common cause of embouchure collapse. As the name suggests, embouchure collapse may be caused by "overuse"—or in simple terms, playing "too much."

Most brass players at some time experience lip swelling (or "stiff lips"). When a player is forced to continue playing despite this, the resulting stress can cause a chain of injuries that lead to embouchure collapse.

Generally speaking, the best way of overcoming swollen lips is to refrain from playing or to practice for a shorter period and with a good warm-up in the days following any period of extensive playing. When a player is deprived of the opportunity to recuperate after a period of extensive playing, the simple matter of swollen lips is not allowed to heal, and the player is forced to work harder to compensate for diminished lip strength. Eventually, the player's facial muscles may collapse under the strain of playing.

== Mouthpiece pressure ==
The subject of mouthpiece pressure is closely related to the issue of embouchure collapse/embouchure overuse.

Many brass instrumentalists argue that excessive mouthpiece pressure is a major cause of embouchure problems and can be a factor in causing embouchure collapse. However, the pressure of the mouthpiece is not static during playing: it increases the higher the register a player plays and the louder the volume level, although excessive mouthpeice pressure regardless of how loud or high you play can lead to a bunch of problems for your playing in the long run. Also, a little mouthpiece pressure is essential to provide a seal between the player's embouchure and the instrument; without this, all the air would escape before entering the instrument and no sound would be emitted (brass instruments are dependent on airflow to produce sound).

Embouchure collapse is far more common among trumpet and horn players. Both of these instruments have mouthpieces with a small circumference and surface area, and therefore the pressure is presumably greater, as the force of the mouthpiece on the face is more concentrated. This is by the principle of physics that pressure is the amount of force divided by the area on which the force is exerted.

As a result of a lack of scientific evidence (no scientific study into mouthpiece pressure as a cause of embouchure collapse has ever been done), the equally valid argument that all brass players can suffer embouchure collapse, and the subjective (not static) nature of mouthpiece pressure, knowledge of mouthpiece pressure as a cause of embouchure collapse is limited.

== Diagnosis ==
Embouchure collapse caused by focal dystonia can be diagnosed medically; embouchure collapse caused by embouchure overuse, however, is generally speaking not considered to be a specific medical issue. A difficulty in diagnosis is that when a brass player describes the symptoms to a doctor or dentist (as is often the case), the medical practitioner does not fully understand what the patient means. This is because brass players learn their embouchure by feel, and therefore words have a limited ability to describe embouchure problems, especially if the person listening to the description is not a brass player and has a limited knowledge of the embouchure.

Also, in less severe cases, the player may only be able to feel what is wrong while playing. Many players with an embouchure problem will, once they have realized that it is more than a simple case of tired lips, wish to refrain from playing. The fact that around 24 muscles are employed in forming a brass embouchure, and that each will change slightly as a player struggles to play when experiencing embouchure problems, mean that what players describe as being wrong will have not only worsened their condition when they play, but will be different each time they do so.

In the most severe cases, the pain caused by embouchure overuse can be felt even when not playing; in some cases, other symptoms will manifest, such as loss of tissue and damaged nerves. This, however, occurs only in the rarest and most extreme circumstances and usually signals the end of the player's career.

== Recovery ==
As stated above, sufferers of focal dystonia have virtually no possibility of recovery from embouchure collapse. Sufferers of embouchure overuse, however, have been known to recover. The simplest way of doing so is to refrain from playing for an extended period of time, possibly years, before attempting to play again. The exact amount of time needed and whether or not the player will have to completely relearn the use of the embouchure is a largely subjective issue and depends on the individual.

Philip Smith, former principal trumpet of the New York Philharmonic, has suffered from focal dystonia, which was part of the reason for his retirement. However, Smith had managed to gradually redevelop control over his embouchure and is now playing again, as well as teaching trumpet in the University of Georgia.

== Additional information ==
Several books on the subject are available, including Broken Embouchures by Lucinda Lewis, a professional hornist, who has succeeded in helping other brass players with embouchure problems.. Other embouchure-related health issues are also cited in Embouchure, Health Issues.
