= Lindemans =

Lindemans may refer to:

- Lindemans Brewery in Belgium
- Lindeman's, an Australian winery
- Christiaan Lindemans (1912-1946), World War II Dutch double agent who worked for the Nazis

== See also ==
- Lindeman (disambiguation)
