= Santy Runyon =

American musician and manufacturer (1907–2003)

Clinton "Santy" Runyon (July 4, 1907 – April 4, 2003) was an American saxophonist and flautist as well as a designer and manufacturer of mouthpieces for woodwind instruments.

Runyon's career included, among other things, playing at Al Capone's speakeasy club, The Coliseum, and giving lessons to many musicians, including the likes of Charlie Parker. Runyon went on to become a significant force in the mouthpiece manufacturing industry.

== Early career ==
Runyon began as a "trap" drummer in the pit of his father's movie house. He would play percussion and supply sound effects for the silent films. He also learned to play the marimba and the vibes and eventually found the instruments that would be the passion of his life: the woodwinds.

Runyon studied music at Oklahoma A&M and the University of Missouri before hitting the road as a traveling musician. He played saxophone with the Benny Maroff, Johnny Green and Henry Busse bands. As a member of the Busse group, at age 25, Runyon created the jazz shuffle beat showcased in Busse's hit recording "Hot Lips".

In 1933, Runyon began an 11-year stint as lead flute player with the Chicago Theater Orchestra. and on Saturday nights, he played The Coliseum, a speakeasy owned by the infamous gangland legend, "Scarface" Al Capone. At the Chicago Theater, he worked with Bob Hope, Bing Crosby, Edgar Bergen, Betty Grable and other show business notables. He even did a running comedy bit with Jack Benny. Between radio, clubs, and the theater, Runyon weathered the Great Depression pretty well, earning $150 a week while many men were taking home $8 or $9 a week.

== Teaching ==
Santy Runyon and Frank Anglund, lead trumpet with the Chicago Theater Orchestra, opened the Runyon Studio. It became an important institution in propagating recent advances in saxophone technique and served as something of a "finishing school" for professional musicians. Through its doors passed such jazz legends as Charlie "Bird" Parker, Paul Desmond, Harry Carney, Lee Konitz, and Sonny Stitt. Runyon had students in most of the big bands of the era, including those of Benny Goodman, Count Basie, Cab Calloway, and Duke Ellington. When Lawrence Welk began his long-running television show, five of his saxophone players were Runyon alumni.

== Mouthpiece and instrument designer and builder ==
In 1941 Runyon sold his first mouthpiece, a variation of a 1918 curved device he had fabricated with chewing gum. He made a metal saxophone mouthpiece for an Army band member, which resulted in an order for thousands of mouthpieces. A manufacturer refused the order and he began manufacturing mouthpieces in Chicago. Runyon's metal mouthpiece was sought for its exceptional dynamic range and projection, suitable for playing in big show bands. In the 1940s he was a consultant for the C G Conn company as they sought to build a more modern alto saxophone, released as the 28M "Connstellation" in 1948. Concurrently, he developed and produced the Conn Comet plastic mouthpiece to go with the 28M, and later produced the design under his own name as the Model 88. He was an early collaborator with Arnold Brilhart, a pioneer in manufacture of molded plastic mouthpieces. Not content with the acrylic and ABS plastics and hard rubber stock commonly in use for non-metallic pieces, he optimized an acrylic/synthetic rubber blend for resilience, shape stability, and durability. After 1966 Runyon produced the Brilhart line of mouthpieces under contract to the H&A Selmer Company, who had acquired rights to the brand. He also continued to develop and produce mouthpieces for saxophone players who wanted something suitable for playing alongside loud, amplified instruments. From this period came the Runyon Custom model mouthpiece, available with a removable "spoiler," or baffle, that altered tonal and dynamic characteristics, the Quantum, and the Bionix, engineered for ease of playing in the altissimo register. During this period he pioneered the use of Delrin which, due to its high rigidity and machinability, is suitable for dimensional copies of metal mouthpieces (XL and Quantum). Runyon moved to Beaumont, Texas in 1960 and to Lafayette, Louisiana in 1970, opening a manufacturing facility on Lewisburg Road in Opelousas. Starting in 1999, Jody Espina collaborated with Runyon and his production staff to develop the mouthpiece designs and prototypes that would launch the Jody Jazz line of high-end mouthpieces. After Santy's death in 2003, the Runyon Products Company continued to operate as a family-owned business until it shut down in the late 2010s (around 2019).
