= Roy Stevens =

American trumpeter (1916–1988)

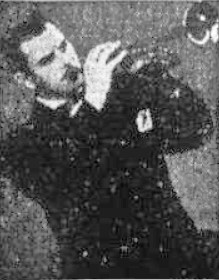
Roy Stevens

Roy Stevens (1916–1988) was an American trumpet player, Stevens-Costello System brass embouchure teacher, and author of the Embouchure Self-Analysis: Stevens-Costello Triple C Embouchure Technique with Bill Moriarity.

== Biography ==
Roy Stevens was born in 1916. His father was a tailor who died when Roy was very young. This was during the depression era so his family faced financial hardships that befell many families. Roy began playing trumpet professionally in his teens to support his family.

Roy played with many of the named bands during the swing era: Tommy Dorsey, Bunny Berigan, and Benny Goodman. Later Roy successfully headed his own big band recording for London Records. Roy's big band won the Downbeat Band of the Year Award in 1950. He was managed by Joe Glaser, manager for Louie Armstrong, Billie Holiday, Hot Lips Page and Henry Red Allen. Roy also played in the section of the Raymond Scott Orchestra and most notably he played with Coleman Hawkins at Kelly's Stable on 52nd Street.

Roy encountered William Costello who was a prominent trumpet teacher who also wrote a column in Metronome magazine. Later when Costello retired, Roy took over the studio referring to the teaching as the Steven-Costello System.

While teaching, Roy maintained his playing in combos and big bands. Besides private teaching, Roy was an Associate Instructor at the Columbia University's Teacher's College. Roy taught trumpet embouchure until his death in October 1988.

== Pupils ==
- Paul G. Bogosian: lead trumpet player for Don Ellis
- Don Ellis: jazz trumpet player, composer and band leader.
- Lloyd Michaels: lead and session trumpet player
- Roy Roman: lead trumpet player for Lionel Hampton, Charlie Palmieri, Tito Puente
- Vince Penzarella: trumpet player for the NY Philharmonic, NY Metropolitan Opera Company
- Lew Soloff: jazz and session trumpet player, band leader
- Dr. Elmer R. White: trumpet player and educator - former professor of music at Appalachian State University
- Bentley Ferguson: Maynard Ferguson's late son spent a summer living and studying with Roy when he was about 14
- Lee Bracegirdle: principal French horn with OFUNAM (México) / Hofer Symphoniker (Germany) / Sydney Symphony Orchestra

== See also ==
- Stevens-Costello embouchure
