= Double-lip embouchure =

Woodwind technique

The double-lip embouchure is a type of embouchure used in playing woodwind instruments like oboe and bassoon, and occasionally clarinet and saxophone. It contrasts with the single-lip embouchure in that both lips cover the dental surfaces.

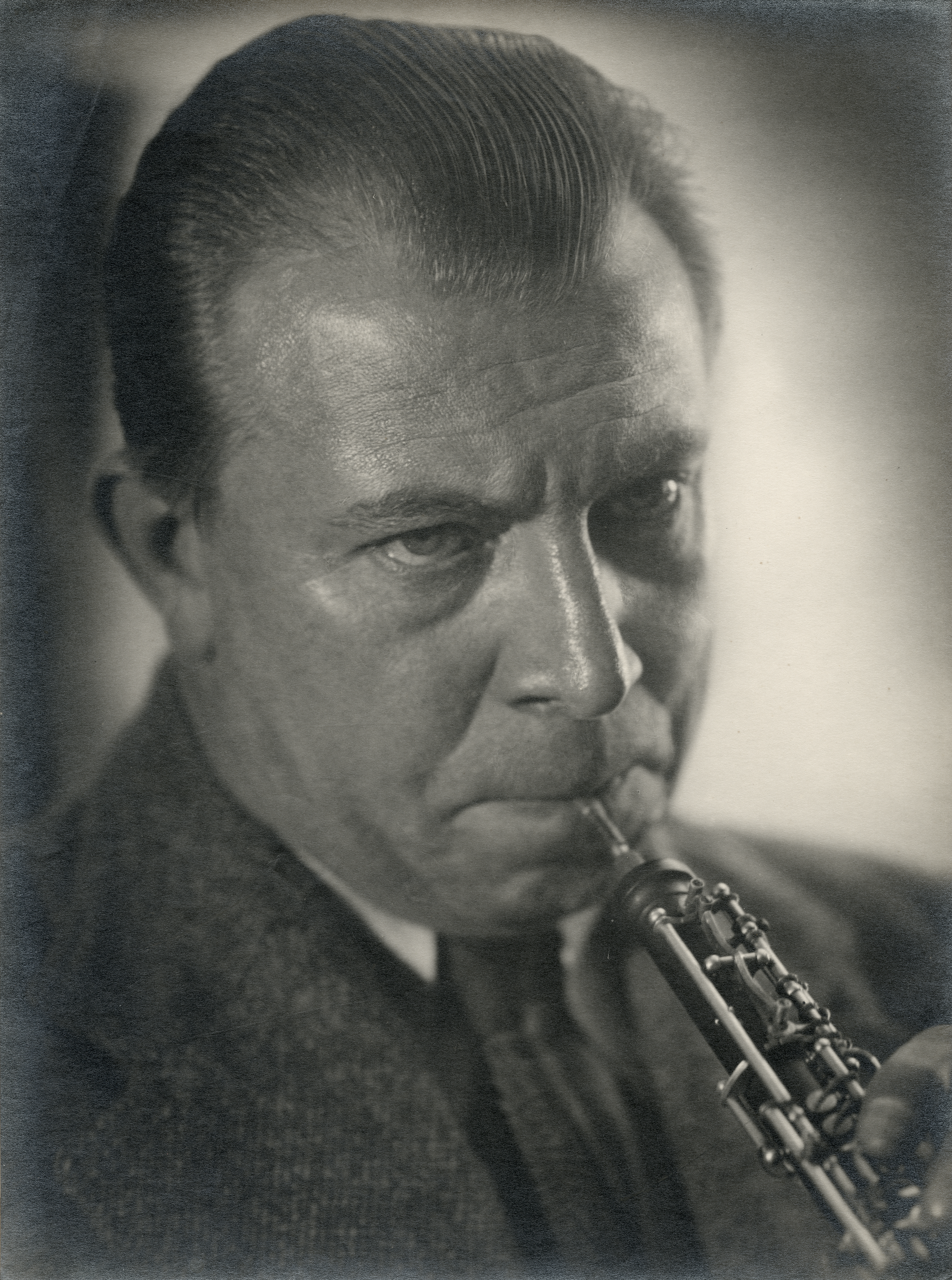
A close-up of Dutch oboist Jaap Stotijn details the double-lip embouchure needed to play the oboe.

Historically the double-lip embouchure was common among clarinettists, and was advocated in methods books, such as those by Jean-Xavier Lefèvre and Franz Frohlich. The shift in the 1820s to playing with the reed facing downwards corresponded with a move away from exclusive double-lip embouchure. Double-lip embouchure was similarly recommended in early saxophone materials, such as those of Adolphe Sax and Louis Mayeur.

The double-lip embouchure supports more even lip muscle development, since both lips are involved in maintaining control of the mouthpiece/reed. Clarinettist Keith Stein suggests that double-lip playing on that instrument can be used as a remedial technique to address issues of "tone production, upper register tonguing, legato binding, high tones, [and] undue tenseness". David Pino recommends this technique to address excess pressure from the jaw as well as "tense, pinching" tone on clarinet. He notes that performers who use this method feel "it is the best way to achieve openness and freedom in tone quality and response".

A double-lip embouchure is sometimes recommended by dentists for single-reed players for whom the single-lip approach is potentially harmful.

Prominent practitioners of double-lip embouchure on saxophone include Johnny Hodges and Warne Marsh; Lee Konitz reported using it for ballads. Clarinettists using this technique include Ralph McLane, Louis Cahuzac, Reginald Kell, and Richard Stoltzman.
