= Joseph Allard =

American music professor (1910–1991)

Joseph Paul Allard
- Born: December 31, 1910
- Origin: Lowell, Massachusetts
- Died: May 3, 1991 (aged 80)
- Instruments: Saxophone, clarinet

Joseph Allard (December 31, 1910 – May 3, 1991) was a professor of saxophone and clarinet at the Juilliard School, the New England Conservatory, and the Manhattan School of Music. He also held adjunct positions at many other schools. He succeeded Vincent J. Abato as the saxophone instructor at Juilliard in 1956 and held that position until the end of the 1983–84 school year. Allard was the first saxophonist with the NBC staff orchestra in New York City, and played on "Firestone Hour" and "Bell Telephone Hour" on TV and radio. He played with Red Nichols and the Five Pennies, played for a brief period with Red Norvo's orchestra, was the saxophone section coach for the Glenn Miller Orchestra and the Benny Goodman Orchestra, and played bass clarinet in the NBC Symphony Orchestra under Arturo Toscanini from 1949-54. He was a native of Lowell, MA.

Allard studied clarinet under Gaston Hamelin of the Boston Symphony and saxophone under Lyle Bowen, and taught many famous students, including Michael Brecker, Eddie Daniels, Bob Berg, Dave Tofani, Dave Liebman, Paul Winter, Jordan Penkower, Victor Morosco, Eric Dolphy, Harvey Pittel, Col Loughnan, Paul Cohen, Anders Paulsson, Harry Carney and Kenneth Radnofsky.
