= Linderman Lake =

Lake in the state of Minnesota, United States

- Location within Minnesota
- Location: Chisago County and Isanti County, Minnesota
- Coordinates: 45°40′38″N 93°8′37″W
- Type: lake

Linderman Lake is a lake in the U.S. state of Minnesota.

Linderman Lake was named for a pioneer farmer who settled there.

== See also ==
- List of lakes in Minnesota
