= William Lindeman =

Piano manufacturer

Lindeman was a name used by a series of piano manufacturers in New York in the nineteenth and twentieth centuries. The concern was founded by William Lindeman (1794–1875) on a small scale in Dresden in about 1822, and reestablished by him in New York City in 1835 or 1836, where it grew to a medium size within twenty years. American piano historian Daniel Spillane credited him as one of the first successful immigrant German piano makers in the United States.

William's sons eventually became partners in the firm, reorganizing first as Lindeman & Son and then Lindeman & Sons and each of them worked in the industry following their father's death. Henry founded several independent piano manufacturing companies, the longest lived of which were Henry & S. G. Lindeman and the Melodigrand Corporation, both of New York; Herman is best known for patenting the firm's unusually shaped "Cycloid" square piano, and with his brother Ferdinand, and son George, he headed the short-lived Lindeman Piano Company of Cincinnati, Ohio.

The Lindeman & Sons name itself was eventually sold and was controlled by different companies after 1890, including the Wanamaker's department store and the piano manufacturing conglomerate Aeolian-American, which also controlled H. & S. G. Lindeman and Melodigrand names. The trademark was most recently owned by Burgett Brothers, Inc., owners of manufacturers Mason & Hamlin and PianoDisk, and who own a number of trademarks from old American piano manufacturers. As of 2014, the brand is defunct.

== Nineteenth century ==
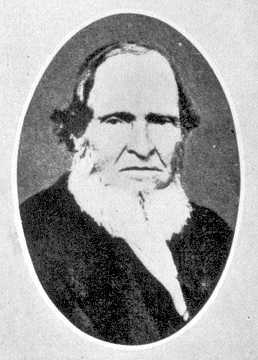
William Lindeman

William Lindeman was born Wilhelm Lindemann on March 28, 1794 in Jöhstadt, in eastern Saxony on the Bohemian border. He was the third of six sons of Karl Gotthilf Lindemann, a preacher and rector of the municipal school. Wilhelm learned cabinetmaking—alone among his brothers in not attending university—and in 1812 moved to Vienna where he worked as a fine furniture maker. He worked in Munich as a pianomaker for about a year, and subsequently in for piano manufacturers Breitkopf & Härtel in Leipzig, and Rosenkranz in Dresden before establishing his own shop, which much later advertisements date at 1822. According to a short biography published in Der Deutsche Pionier of Cincinnati in 1875, Lindeman's output was small and was sold principally through dealers in these cities, and he was unable to profit from what the article described as well regarded and innovative instruments.

Lindeman emigrated to New York City in 1834. The 1875 article recounted that with the help of a translator he applied to work at the piano manufactory of Dubois & Stodart, who operated a music store at 167 Broadway, but that Lindeman became indignant over the delay caused by the approval required by the pianomakers' union, and instead took a non-union position tuning and regulating at Geib & Walker's music store at 23 Maiden Lane. His reported starting salary was $8 a week, which was increased soon afterwards to $12, and he was able to earn as much as $18 a week ($580 today) by taking outside work as a tuner and repairman. He was able to save $80 by economizing and the following year sent for his family to join him.

=== Wm. Lindeman ===
In 1835 or 1836 Lindeman began manufacturing his own pianos, and according to the 1875 article he employed a single journeyman. His initial address was listed at 48 William Street; by 1836 he established a small factory at the corner of Bank and Fourth streets, but reportedly removed to work for piano makers Gerding & Simon on Long Island as a result of the bank crisis of 1837.

Lindeman reestablished himself at 19 James Street, New York City in 1842, and was joined then by his oldest son Herman. The 1875 article described that within two years he produced about two pianos a week, and moved to larger premises at 139 Centre Street. Lindeman was awarded diplomas at the 1847 and 1848 American Institute fairs, placing after piano makers James Pirsson, and Senior & Grovesteen, both of New York, in 1847 and J. H. Schomacker & Co., of Philadelphia, and behind J. H. Grovesteen and D. J. Winkle of New York the following year.

=== Lindeman & Son ===
In 1849, Lindeman made Herman a partner, and the firm moved to 56 Franklin street. The 1855 New York Census reported Lindeman & Son employed about 15 and produced $18,000 worth of pianos (about $622000 today) - representing about one percent of the combined output of the piano factories in New York City as reported in the New York State census of 1855. They were awarded a diploma at the 1857 American Institute fair, placing after Schuetze & Ludolff, Gross & Hulskamp, Boardman & Gray and Henry Hansen.

Lindeman & Son moved to 171 and 173 Mercer street in 1859.

==== Cycloid pianos ====
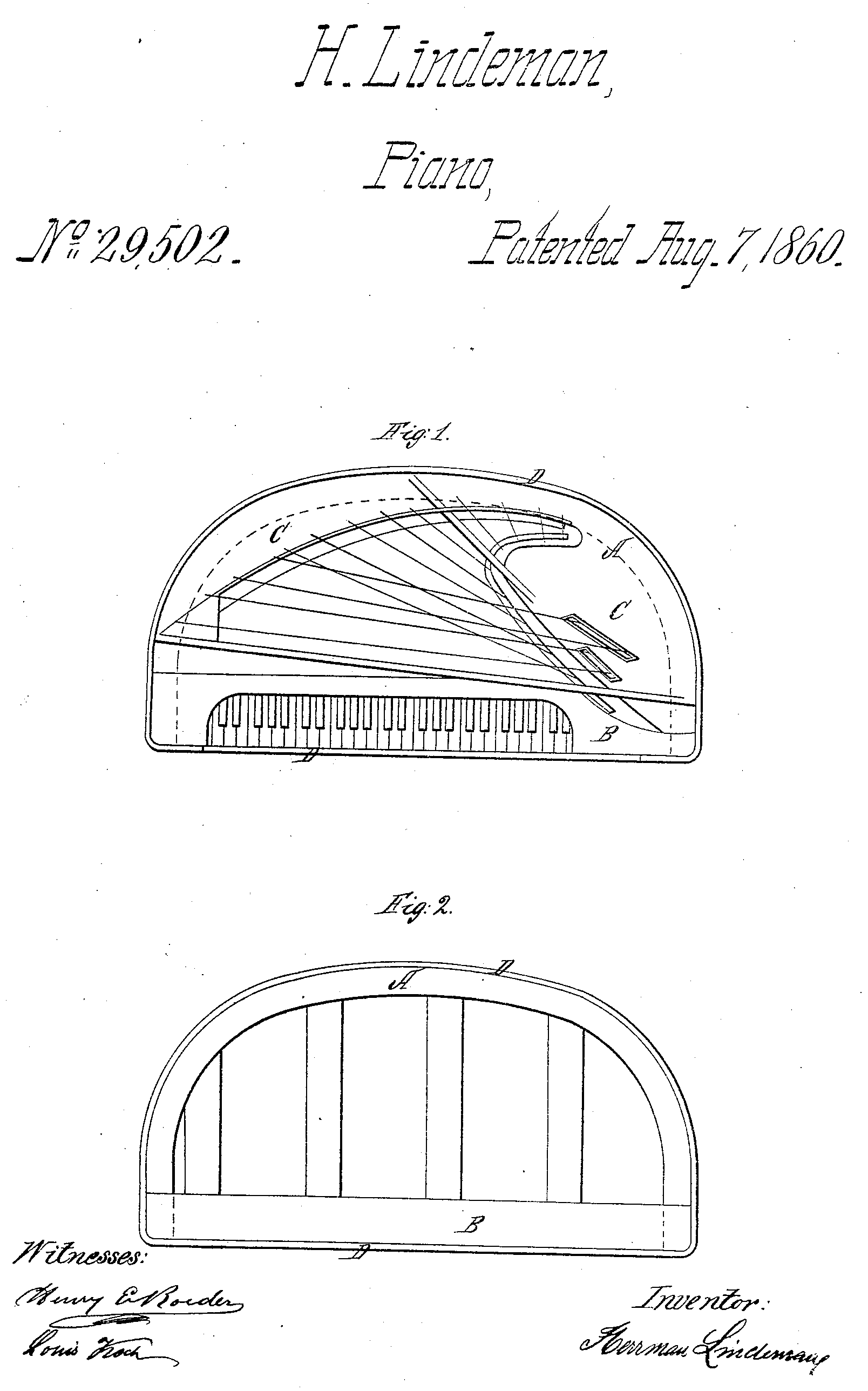
Herman Lindeman, U.S. Patent No. 29,502

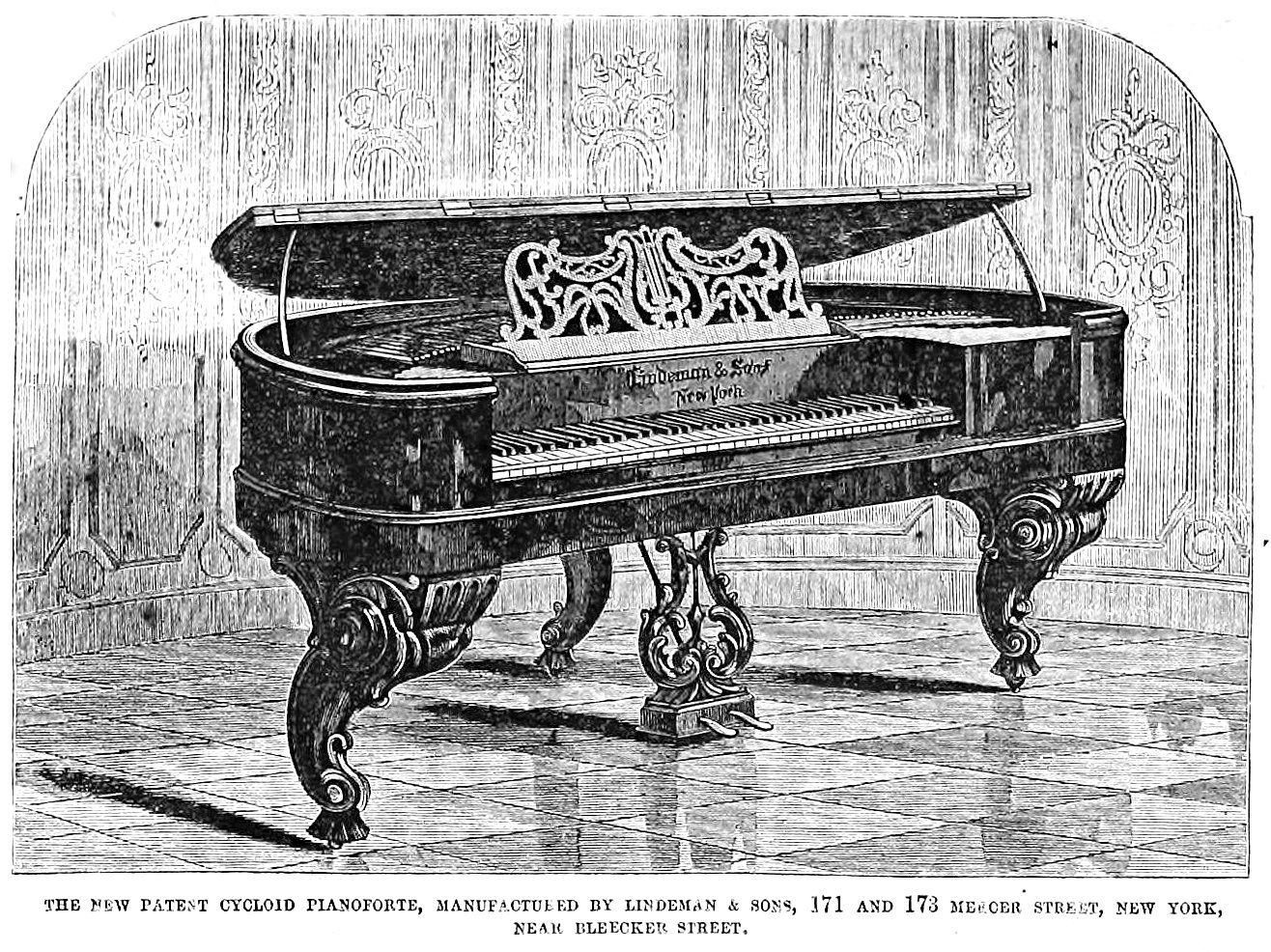
The new patent cycloid pianoforte

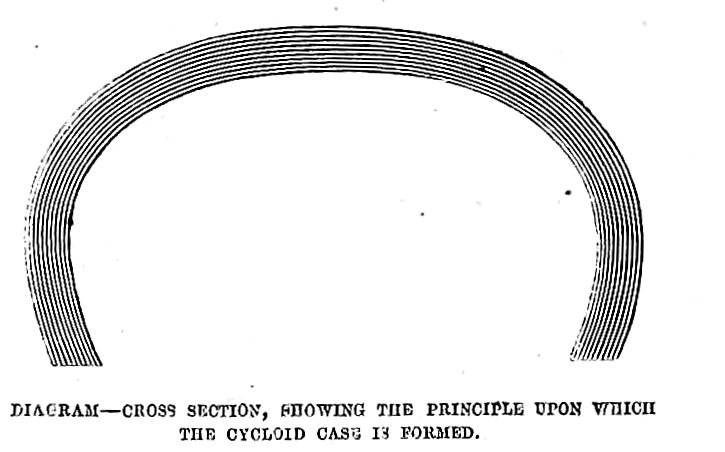
Cross-section of the cycloid case

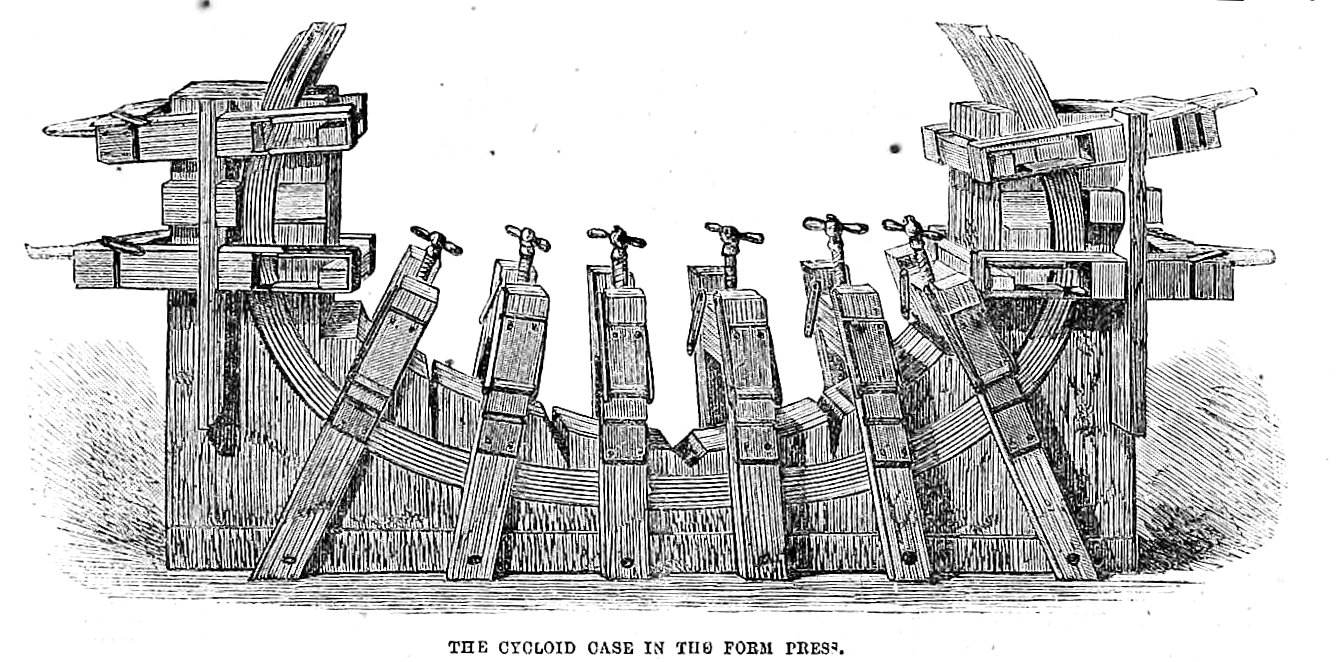
Cycloid case in the form press

Herman Lindeman patented a construction for cycloid pianos in 1860. These roughly semi-circular squares were manufactured with the sides and interior portions of the wooden frame laminated from long, thick veneers bent and glued up into a single, continuous piece with the required shape and thickness, in order to make the pianos "lighter, smaller and circular at the back and sides." The firm advertised that the cycloid was "the most elegant in shape, the most exquisite in tone, the strongest and most enduring piano manufactured in the world" and made an unsupportable claim in the late 1860s that it was "driving the unsightly square piano out of the market." This patent was credited by piano historians Daniel Spillane and Alfred Dolge to Herman's younger brother Henry, who is not listed on the original or reissued United States patents, but is listed jointly with Herman in the 1865 English patent; both historians also identified Henry as the oldest brother.

=== Lindeman & Sons ===
In 1864 sons Henry (August 3, 1835-April 14, 1920) and Ferdinand joined the company, and it was reorganized as Lindeman & Sons. By 1866 they were listed at 173 Mercer, as well as 2 Leroy place and 112 Wooster

The rapid growth of the American piano industry does not appear to have slowed following the financial crisis of in the mid-1850s, although the average sales prices of pianos lowered, but the industry went into decline during the Civil War when both the prices of pianos and value of piano sales compared to the number of workmen dropped. According to the 1860 United States Census fifty-five manufacturers in New York state had employed 2,064 hands—1,728 in New York City—and produced 12,800 pianos worth $2,849,007 ($1,381 per worker, or $223 per piano) compared to sixty-seven manufacturers reporting 7,686 pianos worth $2,592,662 in 1855; ($1,447 per workman. $338 per piano) whereas the 1865 New York state census listed 1,406 workers for forty-one piano manufacturers reporting—only 855 in New York City—and twenty-seven manufacturers declared $1,874,931 in sales. The 1875 article described that Lindeman's workforce was reduced by half during the war.

Lindeman & Sons reported to the Revenue Department the sale of 233 pianos in 1866, far below the numbers reported by Steinway & Sons (1,944 pianos valued $1,001,164), Chickering & Sons (1,526, $651,285), but which ranked them as the thirteenth largest American piano manufacturer, following Albert Weber, Decker Brothers, George Steck & Co., and W. B. Bradbury, all of New York. The firm declared $63,000 in sales in 1869 (which would represent about the same scale as they had reported three years earlier based on an average value, according to census data, of about $300 per piano) but ranked them only twentieth, placed between J. & C. Fischer and Raven, Bacon & Co. of New York

Lindeman & Sons' pianos placed well at many agricultural fairs but they did not earn top honors at major industrial exhibitions. The firm advertised they had been awarded "the first premium gold medal for novelty, superiority and excellence" at the 1865 American Institute Fair, but the list of awards showed that they placed after George Steck & Co., and the Driggs Patent Piano Co., of New York. They were one of only three American piano makers to exhibit at the 1867 Paris Universal Exposition, but failed to win an award and their participation was eclipsed in most American reports by the fierce competition between Steinway and Chickering. A sympathetic article in the American Eclectic Medical Review reported that the cycloid shown at Paris had "fully the power of the best semi-grand but with about two thirds the size," but a New York Times review of the Exposition described the tone of the example at Paris as "pleasant, but thin" and reported that there were "better instruments of the same construction in the Norwegian department.".

The firm established new headquarters at 92 Bleecker Street by 1870, and according to the 1875 biography, their production doubled to eight pianos a week about the same time. They received a second premium for a cycloid at the 1870 American Institute Fair, however the top manufacturers of the country were not represented: F. C. Lighte & Co. took first place, and Taylor & Dupuy, took third. In 1872 Lindeman & Sons removed their New York warerooms to 14 East Fourteenth Street, and in 1874 Herman established a branch in Cincinnati, Ohio at 173 West Fourth street, reportedly to promote their sales in western states.

According to an article from New York Times in 1890, "the old firm of Lindeman & Son" failed in 1875 but was able to reorganize by compromising with their creditors.

=== Lindeman & Sons, Lindeman Brothers ===
William Lindeman died December 24, 1875. Wilson's New York City Copartnership Directory listed the three brothers as proprietors of Lindeman & Sons at the beginning of 1876 but by 1878 it was listed as a partnership between Henry Lindeman and Henry L. Oestreich, while about this time Ferdinand removed to join Herman in Cincinnati. In 1881 the address of the factory changed to 201 Mercer.

The Cincinnati establishment had become Lindeman Brothers by 1881 and advertised grand, cycloid, square and upright pianos as well as Lindeman organs and musical merchandise for sale at 171 and 173 West Fourth Street. In 1886 all three brothers were involved in a corruption scandal involving the Cincinnati Infirmary, charged with having paid its directors $350 to approve a false bill for $700. Ferdinand was sentenced to a year in jail. A notice was published in November, 1889 that all stock of musical instruments, merchandise as well as office and store furniture of Lindeman Brothers, then at 181 West Fourth street, Cincinnati, would be auctioned, benefits of the sale to go to their creditors, but in 1890 Lindeman Brothers is listed at 157 West Fifth street

Lindeman & Sons' New York warerooms removed to 146 Fifth Avenue, and 409 Eighth street, but the firm encountered financial difficulties and lost their Bradstreet rating in 1888. They attempted to raise cash by incorporating and issuing $150,000 public stock but by early 1890 their assets were as low as $15,000 with approximately $100,000 in liabilities. Lindeman & Sons was sold at auction in January, as was the property of Adam Brautigam, a well-known piano dealer of the same city, who had supported the company with up to $50,000 of his own money.

=== Lindeman & Sons, Lindeman Piano Co. ===
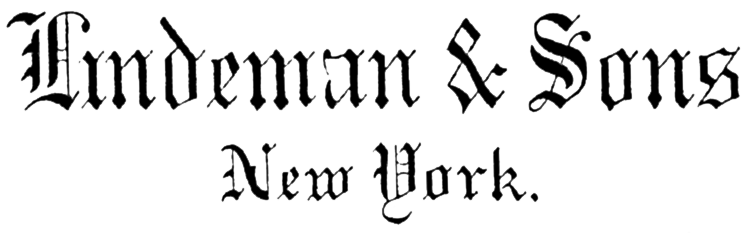

Within a month of the failure, Henry Lindeman organized a new company at 23 East 14th street, which advertised as the "old Reliable" Lindeman & Sons, although Lindeman testified at proceedings that March that he was an employee of the firm and that neither he nor any other family member owned capital in it. The 1890 trademark registration lists its president as William E. Wheelock (Sept. 24, 1852-Feb. 14, 1922), of piano manufacturers Wheelock & Company of New York, The Music Trade Review reported the new firm had been organized with the backing of C. B. Lawson, a member of Wheelock and Stuyvesant, also of New York, and Luther W. P. Norris (b. June 3, 1861), "a young man of great ability and pleasing personality" who had been connected with Wheelock for eight years, and that "[t]he artistic and musical character of the 'Lindeman' Piano has also gained largely, for Mr. Henry Lindeman, freed from business responsibility, has been able to devote himself to the improvement of the instrument with undivided interest." According to the figures based on serial numbers presented by piano historian Cyril Ehrlich in The Piano: A History, the firm produced about 600 pianos a year; their own advertisements in New York city newspapers concentrated on sales of used pianos.

The Lindeman Piano Company first appeared in Cincinnati directories in 1891, listed at 151 West Fifth street, with H. Lindeman president, and G. H. Lindeman vice president and F. Lindeman treasurer; their advertisements offered pianos and organs and stated "established 1836." George Lindeman reportedly left the firm in 1895 to join piano manufacturers Smith & Nixon, also of Cincinnati, but he is listed in 1896, with Herman, as a member of H. Lindeman & Son, at 210 West Seventh street.

In 1896 Otto Grau & Co., agents for Lindeman & Sons in Cincinnati, sued to enjoin H. Lindeman & Son, doing business as The Lindeman Piano Co. from claiming to have connections with the former firm. The court overruled a demurrer by the defendants and found in favor of the plaintiffs, and although The Music Trade Review reported that in its opinion the stencilled words "The Lindeman Piano Co. Cincinnati" could not deceive a prospective purchaser, but that it was deceptive to represent that the two firms were the same, and H. Lindeman & Son was enjoined from selling pianos as previously labelled.

By 1899, H. Lindeman & Son is listed offering pianos and bicycles; they are listed at 206 West Seventh street the following year.

In June 1895 Wheelock & Co. sold their interest in Lindeman & Sons. Norris was elected president, N. S. King vice president and Samuel G. Lindeman, secretary and treasurer, and between them they controlled the entire capital stock of the company.

By 1897 Lindeman & Sons' factory was at the corner of 147th street and Brook avenue, and warerooms at 143 W. 125th street. It was headed by Norris, who would remain with the firm until his retirement in 1916, and N. S. King; Henry Lindeman was superintendent of the factory, but his son Samuel G. Lindeman (b. March 24, 1869) was the firm's secretary and treasurer. King died in 1898

Alfred Dolge described that Samuel G. Lindeman had followed "a complete scientific course" at New York University, graduating in 1888, and that he worked for a year in one of the largest banking institutions in New York before studying three years as a pianomaker under his father.

Henry Lindeman left his position as superintendent in Lindeman & Sons to join piano manufacturers Ivers & Pond in Boston towards the beginning of 1899.

Henry Lindeman filed a petition for bankruptcy the same year, declaring his liabilities as $104,345 with no assets, but by that November he formed the Victoria Piano Company, with a factory on 157-159 East 128th street.

By 1900 S. G. Lindeman's place on the board of the firm was taken by William C. Sherwood. Lindeman & Sons at this time employed about thirty workers, and listed at 550 West 23rd Street with $40,000 capital.

== Twentieth century ==
=== Henry & S. G. Lindeman ===
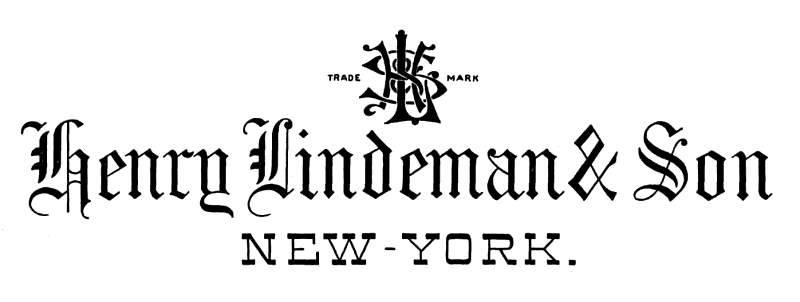

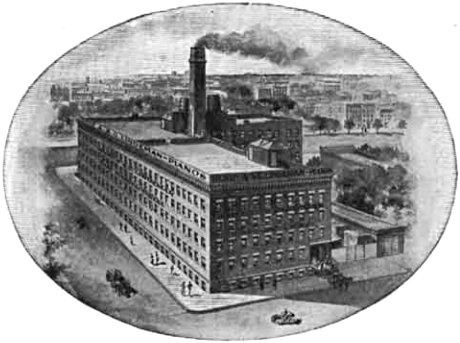
Henry & S. G. Lindeman factory, West 140th Street, 1903

Henry and Samuel G. Lindeman formed a new company named Henry Lindeman & Son in 1900, but according to a notice published by Lindeman & Sons the following year in The Music Trade Review the new company adopted the name Henry & S. G. Lindeman in order to distinguish itself from the more established firm. A 1915 article in the same paper stated that they began manufacturing pianos on a small scale in a loft on 127th Street. but notices from 1900 listed them at 157-159 East 128th street. By the end of that year the paper reported that their factory was not convenient for them, and while the premises afforded "plenty of light and air" they needed more room for stock and it was thought they could "get just as good results on the ground floor", and when the firm's production increased—The Music Trade Review reported they had made and sold 300 instruments during the last five months of 1901, and had orders for 600 by February, 1902—it was necessary for them to lease another floor in the building of their factory, and in 1903 they moved to a new factory at 2 West 140th street.

H. & S. G. Lindeman was incorporated with $100,000 capital in early 1907 with Henry Lindeman as president, Harriet Goldwater secretary and Samuel G. Lindeman treasurer.

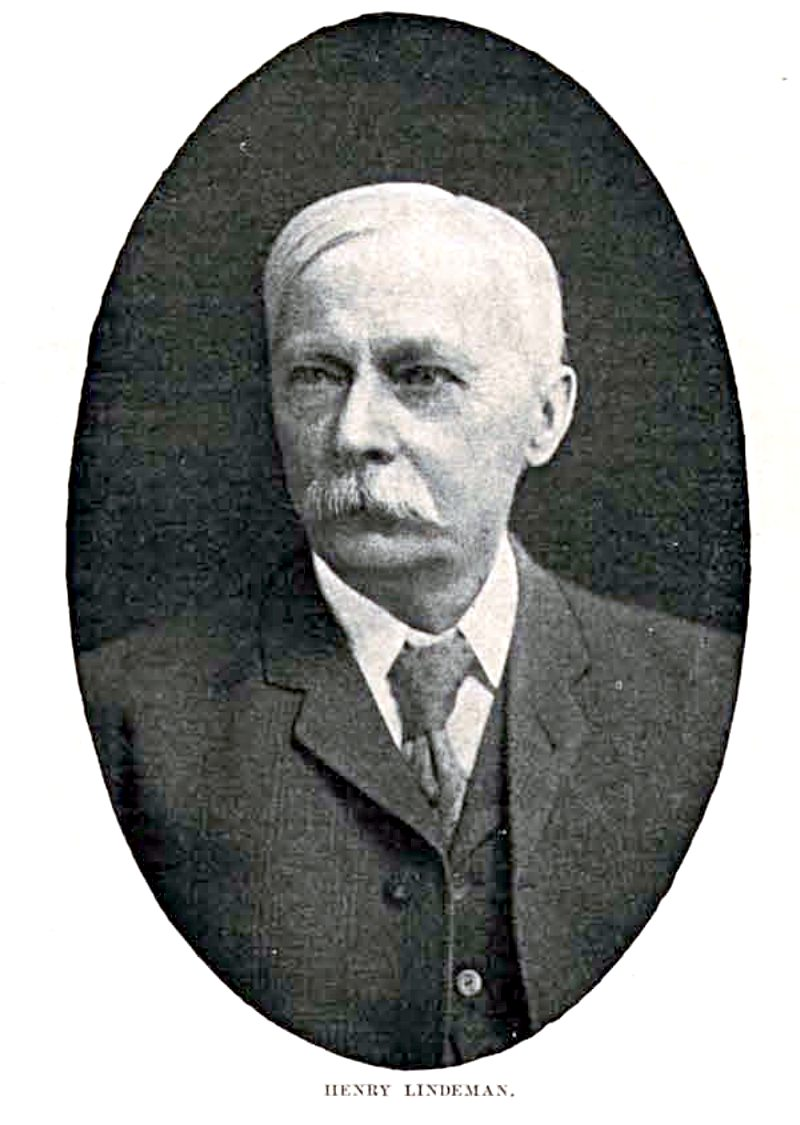
Henry Lindeman

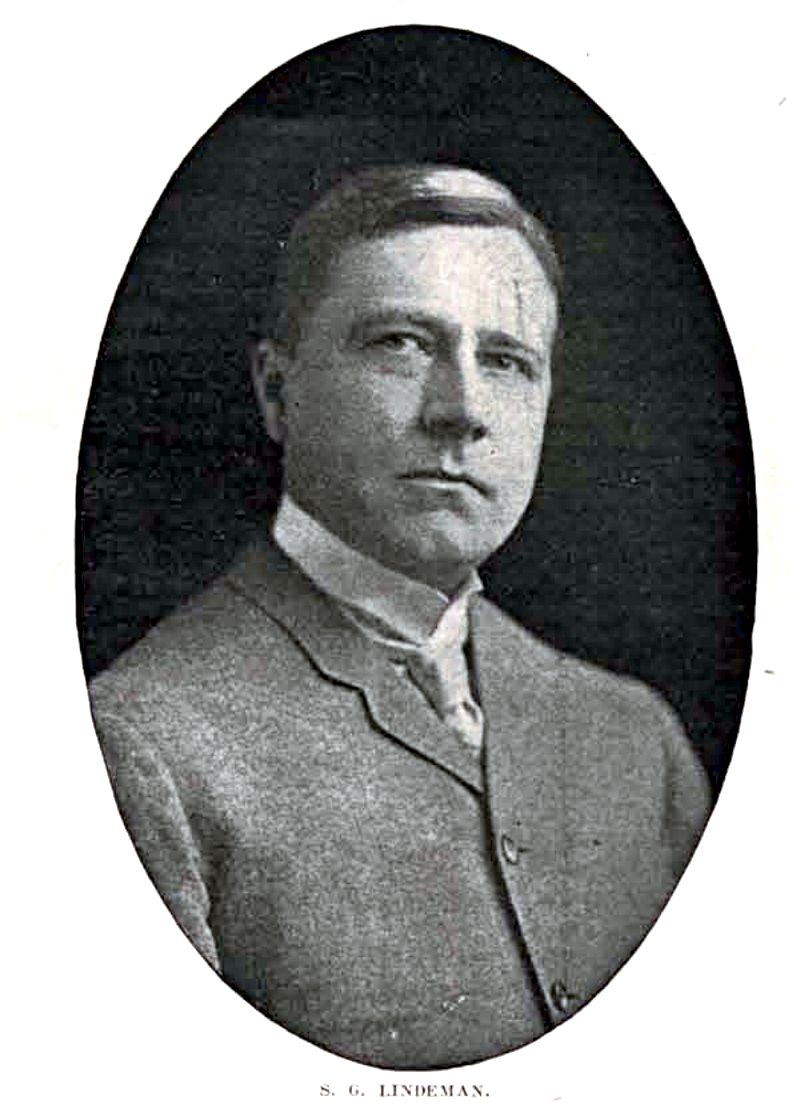
S. G. Lindeman

In March 1908 The Piano, Organ and Musical Instrument Workers' Official Journal reported Henry & S. G. Lindeman had leased a five-story building, with their factory at 132, 134, and 136 West Twenty-fourth Street, and their warerooms at adjoining store and basement at 137 West Twenty-third Street. and increased their capital stock from $100,000 to $150,000; the Trow Directories for this period, however, continue to give the West 140th street address and list $100,000 capital. The Music Trade Review also reported that about this time they had purchased a vacant block, bounded by East 150th street Exterior Street and River avenue in the Bronx, with the intent of building a new factory but had opted to secure additional quarters instead.

Lindeman & Sons were listed at 548 West 23rd street and 155 West 125th street in 1906, and in 1908 only at the W. 23rd street address. The following year they were listed at West 23d and 134 W. 24th, the address given by H. & S. G. Lindeman the previous year. During this period their capital remained about $40,000.

==== Melodigrand ====
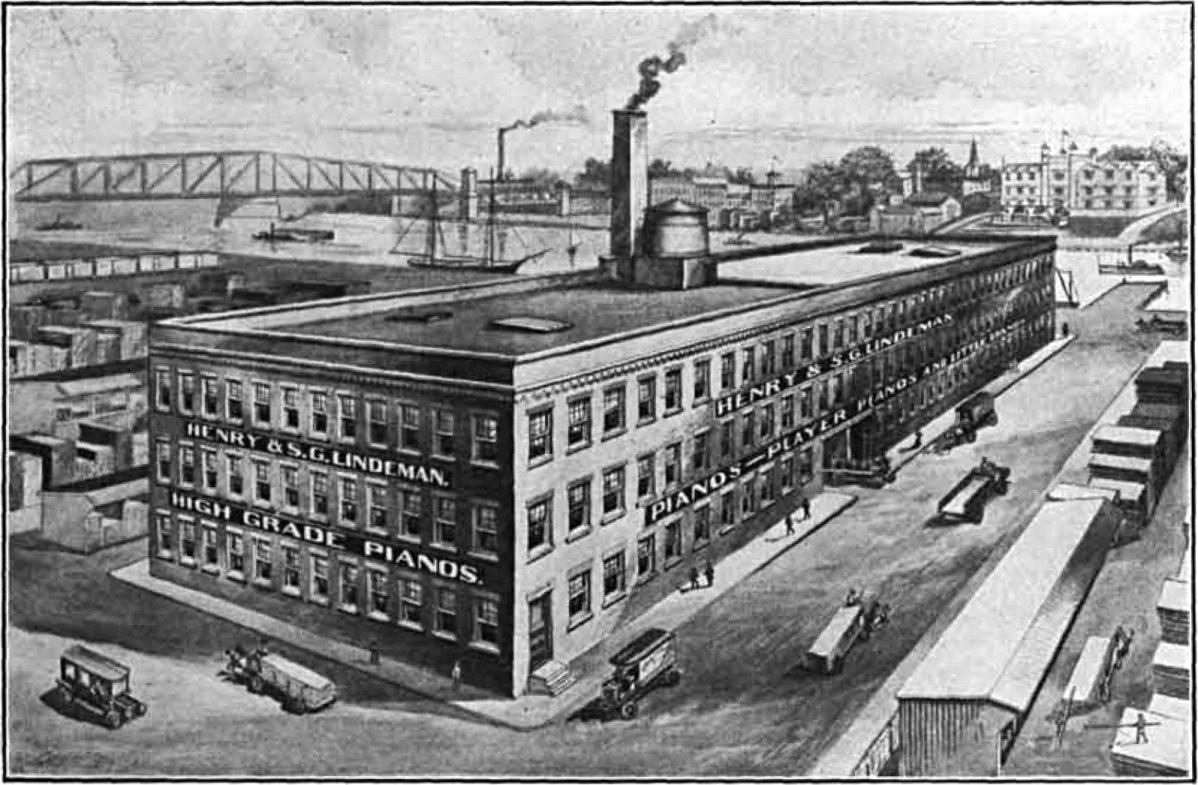
Henry & S. G. Lindeman's new factory, Fifth Avenue, 1911

By 1911 Henry and S. G. Lindeman were joined on the board by Benjamin H. Stern, who served as secretary; Alfred Dolge wrote that Samuel G. Lindeman's son Gillis was poised to join the firm and seemed to possess a particular talent for the trade that he had learned under Henry Lindeman. H. & S. G. Lindeman filed a petition to increase their capital stock from $100,000 to $150,000. and moved into a "new and commodious factory" on Fifth avenue occupying the entire block between 142nd and 143d streets, measuring 80 feet by 195 feet, and three stories high which gave them about 50,000 square feet of space. The Music Trade Review described it as "one of the finest factories to be found in the uptown manufacturing district" and projected that it would increase their output by 50 percent.

Also in about 1911 Henry & S. G. Lindeman obtained an interest in the soundboard calibration device patented in 1909 by piano dealer and inventor Frank B. Long, of Los Angeles. Marketed as the "Melodigrand", this was a method for maintaining or restoring the slight crowning of a soundboard through a series of screws pressed against blocks applied directly to the panel, like Steinway & Sons' lapsed and disused system and similar to the Mason & Hamlin "tension resonator", then in force and which is still manufactured and promoted by that firm. Shown for uprights in the patent, Dolge claimed that H. & S. G. Lindeman embodied "the same in all of their pianos, with great success."

Lindeman & Sons had come under the control of Wanamaker's department store, which also owned controlling interests in piano manufacturers Schomacker of Philadelphia and Emerson of Boston, and held agencies for American Piano Company brands including Chickering & Sons and Wm. Knabe & Co. Lindeman & Sons was located at 461 West 40th street and its directors were James B. Woodford, Everard F. Tibbot, and Paul V. Bunn.

=== Wanamaker's ===
Henry & S. G. Lindeman went bankrupt in 1914. The Piano Magazine reported it was "said that their failure was due to investments in the retail business preceding the continued tightness in the money market." A petition for bankruptcy was filed soon afterwards against the company's affiliate Jameson-Allen Piano Company of Philadelphia, while the Melodigrand trademark was taken over by Long in exchange for relinquishing part of his claims against the estate. J. & C. Fischer also purchased a patent subject to a suit that they claimed infringed a patent held by them. An auction was announced for late November to sell the stock in trade and goodwill and use of the name Henry & S. G. Lindeman and all of the firm's assets were sold for $27,000 to George W. Gittens, president of piano manufacturer Kohler & Cambell, Inc., of New York. Gittens immediately sold the property to the Lindeman & Sons Piano Company, then still controlled by Wanamaker's—a reversal of fortunes according to an article in The Piano Magazine and Music Industry which reported that in better times Henry & S. G. Lindeman had seriously considered purchasing Lindeman & Sons. The article also reported that Henry Lindeman apparently would be employed indefinitely by the new owners.

The Frank B. Long Melodigrand Company discontinued in late 1915 or early 1916 when Long removed to Sacramento, and his entire Los Angeles stock, including Melodigrand and Frank B. Long pianos, was purchased by the Zellner Piano Co., of Los Angeles.

L. W. P. Norris retired as vice president from Lindeman & Sons in 1916.

=== Jefferson Piano Company, Melodigrand Co. ===
Within three months of the failure Henry and Samuel G. Lindeman were reported to have organized the Jefferson Piano Company, of New York, and to have leased space in part of their old factory to manufacture pianos. By 1917, however, along with Gillis R. Lindeman they controlled the Melodigrand Co., of New York. The 1918-1919 Trow New York Copartnership and Corporation Directory listed their capital as $25,000.

The same directory listed Lindeman & Sons' capital as $200,000.

Henry Lindeman was struck and killed by an automobile April 14, 1920. The obituary in Presto described that at 81 he had still been "active and as interested in the product of his factory as when he was a young man." S. G. Lindeman succeeded him as president.

=== United Piano Corp., Celco Corp.; S. G. Lindeman & Son ===
In 1922 Lindeman & Sons, with a reported capacity 3,000 pianos per year and which still owned H. & S. G. Lindeman, were purchased from Wanamaker's, as was the much larger Emerson Piano Co. of Boston by J. H. Shale, treasurer of A. B. Chase of Chicago, and J. H. Williams, of the Knabe Warerooms, Inc, of Baltimore, who formed a holding company known as United Piano Corporation, of Norwalk Ohio, which was capitalized for $1,000,000 and which operated A. B. Chase, along with the two Lindeman firms and soon introduced the Celco reproducing player piano mechanism. In 1924 all of the divisions were moved to a 110,000 square foot factory in Norwalk, Ohio.

J. H. Shale retired from the board in 1926, and sold his stock to father and son J. H. and E. S. Williams, giving them control of the firm. A petition for bankruptcy was filed against the firm soon afterwards by a group of suppliers at which time its liabilities where listed at about $300,000 and assets $100,000. Shale purchased the firm's assets and good will for $110,000 in 1927, and formed the Celco Corporation in New York., with headquarters in Norwalk and with himself as president, Earle D. Button treas, Walter A. Hall secretary. In mid 1928 the firm reorganized as the A. B. Chase-Emerson Corporation under the same management, citing that the Celco Corp. had been "formed hurriedly for temporary use". The same year the firm announced that they were adding a line of motorboats to their products.

In early 1929 George G. Foster, formerly of Foster-Armstrong and founder of American Piano Company, became chairman of the board of A. B. Chase-Emerson That June, Lindeman & Sons reduced their capital from 2,000 shares of $100 par value to 100 shares no par.

S. G. Lindeman & Son, Inc. were listed in the Presto-Times Directory of American Piano Manufacturers in 1928, still at 5th avenue and 140th street, New York, as "Makers of the Melodigrand piano with specially constructed sounding board designed to prevent splitting." Presto-Times reported in mid-1931 that "Sam Lindeman, long connected with the manufacture of Melodigrand pianos at New York, and son of the founder of S. G. Lindeman & Son, Inc., is now connected with the municipal department of the city of Mount Vernon, N. Y." and the firm was listed as one of nine piano manufacturing concerns in "liquidation, reorganization or in the hands of creditors" in early 1932. Over seventy other firms were listed as no longer manufacturing and out of business.

=== Lester, American Piano and Aeolian ===
In 1931, citing "increased activities in other lines being produced in the Norwalk factory", A. B. Chase-Emerson announced that arrangements had been made for their A. B. Chase, Emerson, and Lindeman & Sons pianos to be manufactured by a new division of the Lester Piano Company, of Philadelphia.

The American Piano Corporation filed to use the Lindeman & Sons trademark in 1941, and it was assigned with the company's holdings to the Winter-controlled Aeolian-American Corporation in 1959, which owned the name until Aeolian's bankruptcy in 1985.

=== Wurlitzer and Baldwin ===
The name passed from Wurlitzer to Gibson and Baldwin between 2000 and 2002, although in 2002 a typed drawing filed by Gibson Piano Ventures, Inc. of Nashville, Tennessee was refused on the grounds it was not sufficiently descriptive or unique. The Lindeman & Sons trademark was withdrawn by them in 2005.

=== Burgett Brothers ===
The final owners of the Lindeman & Sons trademark, Burgett Brothers, Inc., of Haverhill, Massachusetts successfully filed to use the name several months later. Burgett Bros. are owners of Mason & Hamlin and PianoDisk, and also control the Sohmer & Co., Wm. Knabe & Co., Mathushek, and Wessell, Nickel & Gross trademarks. They cancelled the trademark at the end of 2013
