= Erich Lindemann (botanist) =

German phycologist and taxonomist

- Born: May 8, 1888; Güstrow, Mecklenburg-Vorpommern, Germany
- Died: May 2, 1945 (aged 56); Erbach, Hesse, Germany
- Occupations: Phycologist and taxonomist
- Spouse: No

Erich Lindemann (May 8, 1888, in Güstrow, Mecklenburg-Vorpommern – May 2, 1945, in Erbach, Hesse) was a German phycologist and taxonomist.

== Early life, education, and family ==
Lindemann's father was a teacher with Protestant-Lutheran confession. Lindemann was unmarried. As Sergeant, he participated in World War I and was decorated with the Iron Cross.

== Career ==
After secondary education, Erich Berthold Ludwig Wilhelm Lindemann studied natural science in Munich, Berlin and particularly Rostock. He practised as teacher ‒in this order‒ at the gymnasium Rawicz, at the Realschulen Chodzież, Poznań and Wolsztyn, at the gymnasiums Rogoźno and Ostrów Wielkopolski and at royal Comenius-gymnasium in Leszno. In Wrocław, Lindemann completed his PhD at the Schlesische Friedrich-Wilhelms-Universität zu Breslau in 1915. From 1919 to 1924, Lindemann was teacher in Tempelhof (Berlin), but was put in retirement in 1933 at the latest.

Lindemann's scientific work comprises the description of numerous dinophyte species. He was editor of the journal Schriften für Süßwasser- und Meereskunde und founding member of the International Society of Limnology

== Works ==
- Studien zur Biologie der Teichgewässer, Breslau: Borntraeger, 1915
- "Studien zur Biologie der Teichgewässer" in Zeitschrift für Fischerei Berlin 17, 1915: 69–154
- "PeridiniumGüstrowiense n. sp. und seine Variationsformen" in Archiv für Hydrobiologie 11, 1916: 490–495
- "Beiträge zur Kenntnis des Seenplanktons der Provinz Posen" in Zeitschrift der Naturwissenschaftlichen Abteilung der Deutschen Gesellschaft für Kunst und Wissenschaft in Posen 23, 1916: 2–31
- "Zur Biologie einiger Gewässer der Umgebung von Güstrow in Mecklenburg-Schwerin" in Archiv des Vereins der Freunde der Naturgeschichte in Mecklenburg 71, 1917: 105–134
- "Beiträge zur Kenntnis des Seenplanktons der Provinz Posen (Südwest-Posen, Seengrupe) II" in Zeitschrift der Naturwissenschaftlichen Abteilung der Deutschen Gesellschaft für Kunst und Wissenschaft in Posen 24, 1917: 2–41.
- "Mitteilungen über Posener Peridineen" in Zeitschrift der Naturwissenschaftlichen Abteilung der Deutschen Gesellschaft für Kunst und Wissenschaft in Posen 25, 1918: 23–25.
- "Untersuchungen über Süßwasserperidineen und ihre Variationsformen" in Archiv für Protistenkunde 39, 1919: 209–262
- "Untersuchungen über Süßwasserperidineen und ihre Variationsformen II" in Archiv für Naturgeschichte 84, 1920: 121–194
- "Technische Winke für die Untersuchungen von Süßwasserperidineen" in Mikrobiologische Monatshefte 12, 1922: 1–13
- "Ein neues Spirodinium" in Hedwigia 64, 1923: 146–147
- "Eine Entwicklungshemmung bei Peridiniumborgei und ihre Folgen" in Archiv für Protistenkunde 46, 1923: 378–382
- "Neue oder wenig bekannte Protisten. IX. Neue oder wenig bekannte Flagellaten. VIII. Neue von G. J. Playfair beschriebene Süßwasserperidineen aus Australien, mit kritischen Bemerkungen über ihre systematische Stellung" in Archiv für Protistenkunde 47, 1924: 109–130
- "Eine interessante Süsswasserflagellate" in: 7–10
- "Die Mikroflora des Zwergbirkenmoors von Neulinum" in: 38–42 (co-author: Steinecke, F.)
- "UeberPeridineen einiger Seen Süddeutschlands und des Alpengebietes" in: 158–163
- "Der Bau der Hülle bei Heterocapsa und Kryptoperidiniumfoliaceum (Stein) n. nom." in Botanisches Archiv 5, 1924: 114–120
- "Eine tierische Pflanze — ein pflanzenhaftes Tier!" in Schriften für Süßwasser- und Meereskunde 2, 1924: 274–277
- "Neue oder wenig bekannte Protisten. X. Neue oder wenig bekannte Flagellaten. IX. Mitteilungen über nicht genügend bekannte Peridineen" in Archiv für Protistenkunde 47, 1924: 431–439
- "Peridineen aus dem Alpengebiete" in Schriften für Süßwasser- und Meereskunde 2, 1924: 194–200
- "Peridineen aus dem Goldenen Horn und Bosporus" in Botanisches Archiv 5, 1924: 216–233
- "Peridineen des Alpenrandgebietes" in Botanisches Archiv 8, 1924: 297–303
- "Vom Plankton des Golfes von Neapel" in Schriften für Süßwasser- und Meereskunde 2, 1924: 3–11
- "Vom Plankton warmer Meere" in Die Naturwissenschaften 12, 1924: 888–895
- "III. Klasse: Dinoflagellatae (Peridineae)", pp. 144–195 in: Schoenichen, W., (ed), Einfachste Lebensformen des Tier- und Pflanzenreiches. Naturgeschichte der mikroskopischen Süßwasserbewohner, Berlin: Bermühler, 1925.
- "Die Schwalbenschwanzalge (Ceratium hirundinella O. Fr. M.)" in Mikrokosmos 18y 14–20
- "Neubeobachtungen an den Winterperidineen des Golfes von Neapel" in Botanisches Archiv 9, 1925: 95–102.
- "Peridineen aus Seen der Schweiz" in Botanisches Archiv 10, 1925: 205–208.
- "Peridineen des Oberrheins und seiner Altwässer" in Botanisches Archiv 11, 1925: 474–481
- "Ueber finnische Peridineen" in Archiv für Hydrobiologie 15, 1925: 1–4
- "Der dritte Limnologenkongreß in Rußland." in Der Naturforscher 2, 1925, pp. 429–430, pl. LIX.
- "Fahrt durch das europäische Rußland." in Ostdeutscher Naturwart 2, 1925, pp. 552–557.
- "Bewegeliche Hüllenfelderung und ihr Einfluss auf die Frage der Artbildung bei Glenodinien" in Archiv für Hydrobiologie 16, 1926: 437–458
- "Peridineen aus Altwässern des Flusses Donjez bei Charkow (Ukraine)" in Botanisches Archiv 14, 1926:467–473
- "Massensterben von Fischen infolge einer Hochproduktion von Panzergeißlingen (Peridineen)" in Kleine Mitteilungen für die Mitglieder des Vereins für Wasserversorgung und Abwässerbeseitigung 2, 1926: 113–119.
- "Die 3. Tagung der Internationalen Vereinigung für theoretische und angewandte Limnologie in Rußland" in Mikrokosmos 19, 1926: 60–62
- "Peridineenbestimmungen" in Mikrokosmos 19: 31–33, 1926
- "Die Süßwasser-Diplopsalis im Kaspischen Meere" in Mikrokosmos 20, 1927: 124–125
- "Dinoflagellaten aus der Wolga" in Arbeiten der Biologischen Wolga-Station 9, 1927: 1–3
- "Über einige Dinoflagellaten des Kaspischen Meeres" in Archiv für Protistenkunde 59, 1927: 418–422
- "Über einige Peridineen des Kieshofer Moores" in Beiträge zur Naturdenkmalpflege 12, 1927: 130–135
- "Abteilung Peridineae (Dinoflagellatae)", pp. 3–104 in: Engler, A., & Prantl, K., (eds), Die natürlichen Pflanzenfamilien, 2. ed., Leipzig: Engelmann, 1928
- "Über die Schwimmbewegungen einer experimentell eingeißelig gemachten Dinoflagellate" in Archiv für Protistenkunde 64, 1928: 507–510
- "Neue Peridineen" in Hedwigia 68, 1928: 291–296
- "Parasitische Dinoflagellaten" in Mikrokosmos 21, 1928: 122–126
- "Vorläufige Mitteilung" in Archiv für Protistenkunde 63, 1928: 259–260
- "Experimentelle Studien über die Fortpflanzungserscheinungen der Süßwasserperidineen auf Grund von Reinkulturen" in Archiv für Protistenkunde 68, 1929: 1–104
- "Über eine limnologische Bedeutung der freien Kohlensäure" in Die Naturwissenschaften 51, 1930: 1113
- "Die Peridinineen der deutschen limnologischen Sunda-Expedition nach Sumatra, Java und Bali" in Archiv für Hydrobiologie Suppl. 8, 1931: 691–732

Eponymy: Hemidinium lindemannii Skvortsov, Peridinium lindemannii M.Lefèvre, Stylodinium lindemannii Baumeister.
