= Matt Von Roderick =

American jazz musician

Matt Von Roderick (born Matthew Benjamin Roderick Shulman, October 7, 1974) is an American trumpeter, rapper, singer and recording artist. In 2003, he was named Jazz Artist of the Year by the Independent Music Awards.

== Musical career ==
Von Roderick was born into a musical family in Lyndonville, Vermont. His father, Alvin Shulman, is a violinist and first generation American born in New York City, of Russian and Polish descent. His mother, born Elizabeth von Stackelberg in Munich, Germany, was of German, Irish and British descent. She emigrated to America after World War II, and was a piano teacher. Von Roderick is Jewish, and has called his bar mitzvah a formative musical experience.

In 2007, Von Roderick released his first commercial album, So It Goes, under the name Matt Shulman, through the independent label Jaggo Records. With the album came comparisons to "a postmillennial Chet Baker" from The New York Times, which also cited him as among the significant "New Voices from Jazz's Emerging Generation." Matt is noted for his progressive development of multiphonics, in which he "uses his voice as a muted horn in solo and duet with the trumpet..." (All About Jazz).

Von Roderick made his Carnegie Hall debut as a featured guest soloist with the New York Pops Orchestra, and has appeared as both a soloist and composer at Lincoln Center and the Kennedy Center for the Performing Arts. A graduate of the Oberlin Conservatory of Music, he went on to receive his Master's of Music from New York University, where he was granted the Alberto Vilar Global Fellowship. While on fellowship at New York University, he was classically trained by Juilliard trumpet pedagogue, Mark Gould (Principal Emeritus, Metropolitan Opera). Von Roderick is a former member of the New York Trumpet Ensemble, as led by Gould. Former members of the ensemble include trumpet virtuoso and founder, Gerard Schwarz. While living in New York City, Matt performed with the Saturday Night Live Band when the band included Lukasz Gottwald (Dr. Luke) and was one of three trumpeters considered to fill the chair permanently.

Von Roderick has performed with Neil Diamond, Musiq Soulchild, Brad Mehldau, Dionne Warwick, Tenacious D, Super Furry Animals, DJ Spinna, John Corigliano, Lenny Pickett, and John Medeski. He was also featured on Nnenna Freelon's Grammy-nominated album, Soul Call. Awards include the Yamaha Young Performing Artist Award, 1st place in the International Trumpet Guild Competition, 1st place in the National Trumpet Competition, and a finalist in the Thelonious Monk International Competition. He developed the Shulman System, a device he patented for promoting a more efficient and musical approach to the trumpet, which creates balance and support for the instrument.

In 2009, he changed his professional name to Matt Von Roderick and moved from New York City to Los Angeles.

In 2010 he debuted new music and a stage show at the King King club in Hollywood directed by Tony nominee Kristin Hanggi, of which The Huffington Post declared: "Matt Von Roderick Makes Jazz Dangerous Again". His residencies in Los Angeles have played on a futuristic speakeasy theme, and include stints with nightlife impresario Ivan Kane, and André Balazs' The Standard Hotel. TheComet.com has stated of Matt's live show: "Matt Von Roderick's Lush Life Brings Hollywood Glamor Back To Life."

In 2012 Von Roderick released a "pop mix" and video of his single "Let the Trumpet Talk", to favorable coverage by both CBSnews.com and BroadwayWorld.com.

Von Roderick was selected to perform a solo trumpet rendition of the song 'Stardust' as part of the opening ceremony at the 2013 Grammy Foundation's Play It Forward event in Beverly Hills.
