= Subtone =

Music terminology

Subtone is an advanced technique of tone generation on woodwind instruments, particularly the saxophone and clarinet. It is often described as a soft, breathy timbre that is usually produced in the lowest range of the instrument with low volume.

== Popular use ==
Photo of Ben Webster, one of the early popularizers of the technique.

The subtone is used predominantly in jazz, where it has been characteristic of saxophone and clarinet playing since the Swing era with players like Ben Webster and Benny Goodman. Other early practitioners from the 1930s and 1940s include Lester Young, Harry Carney, Woody Herman, Johnny Hodges and Coleman Hawkins. More modern examples of the 1950s, 1960s and beyond include Stan Getz, Paul Desmond, Gerry Mulligan, and Grover Washington Jr. Its unique timbre and quiet temperament lends itself well to jazz ballads, where it has been historically utilized. However, the subtone is regularly employed in virtually every genre of jazz, whether the tempo be fast or slow. The diversity of the below list demonstrates this, as there is an example from the Swing era of the 1930s and 1940s, from cool jazz of the late 1950s, and from jazz bossa nova of the mid-1960s, to name a few.

== Notable examples ==
Some notable examples include:

- Coleman Hawkins' 1939 performance of "Body and Soul"
- Ben Webster's 1940 performance of "Star Dust," as well as other performances from Duke Ellington at Fargo, 1940 Live
- Woody Herman and his orchestra's 1949 performance of "Early Autumn"
- Paul Desmond's 1959 performance of "Take Five," as well as other performances from Time Out
- Ben Webster's 1959 performance of "Sunday," as well as other performances from Ben Webster Meets Oscar Peterson
- Dexter Gordon's 1962 performance of "I Guess I'll Hang My Tears Out to Dry"
- Stan Getz's 1963 performance of "Desafinado," as well as other performances from Getz/Gilberto
- John Coltrane's 1963 performance of "Alabama"
- Stan Getz's 1964 performance of "Misty," as well as other performances from Bob Brookmeyer and Friends
