= Claribel =

Claribel may refer to:

== People ==
- Claribel (1864–1929), one of the Cone sisters, socialites and noted art collectors
- Claribel Kendall (1889–1965), American mathematician
- Claribel Medina (born 1961), Puerto Rican actress
- Claribel Nye (1889–1960), American home economist
- Claribel Wheeler (1881–1965), American nurse
- Claribel Alegría, pseudonym of Nicaraguan poet, essayist, novelist, and journalist Clara Isabel Alegría Vides (1924–2018)
- Charlotte Alington Barnard (1830–1869), English poet and composer of ballads and hymns under the pseudonym Claribel

== Places ==
- Claribel, original name of the city of Richmond Heights, Ohio
- Claribel Creek: see List of rivers of Ohio

== Other uses ==
- "Claribel" (poem), by Alfred, Lord Tennyson
- Saxonette, a soprano clarinet also known as a claribel
- Operation Claribel, see List of Special Operations Executive operations in World War II
- Claribel, mentioned but not seen in Shakespeare's The Tempest

== See also ==
- Clarabella (disambiguation)
- Clarabelle (disambiguation)
