= 14 Compositions (Traditional) 1996 =

Live album by Anthony Braxton / Stewart Gillmor Duo
- Released: 1998
- Recorded: January 25, 1996
- Venue: Wesleyan University, Middletown, CT
- Genre: Jazz
- Length: 65:12
- Label: Leo; CD LR 259
- Producer: Anthony Braxton, Leo Feigin

Anthony Braxton chronology
Solo Piano (Standards) 1995 (1995)	14 Compositions (Traditional) 1996 (1998)	Composition No. 102 for Orchestra & Puppet Theatre (1996)

14 Compositions (Traditional) 1996 is a live album by composer and saxophonist Anthony Braxton with multi-instrumentalist Stewart Gillmor, recorded at Wesleyan University in 1994 and released on the Leo label.

== Reception ==
Professional ratings
Review scores
Source	Rating
AllMusic	4.5/5 stars
The Penguin Guide to Jazz Recordings	3/4 stars

The Allmusic review by Steve Loewy stated:

... this recording of fourteen tunes from the first half of the century is a major addition to Braxton's remarkable discography. Here, he takes old standards, songs like "Ja Da," "Star Dust," and "Rosetta," and gives them new twists. The variety is astonishing, as Braxton and Gillmor try every variation imaginable. ... Often the melodies and solos are true to the era, though there are enough surprises to make this an entirely entertaining and fascinating collection.

— Loewy, Steve. 14 Compositions (Traditional) 1996 – Review at AllMusic. Retrieved June 13, 2017.

== Track listing ==
1. "Rosetta" (Earl Hines, Henri Woode) – 4:20
2. "Kansas City Man Blues" (Clarence Johnson, Clarence Williams) – 5:18
3. "Do You Know What It Means to Miss New Orleans?" (Louis Alter, Eddie DeLange) – 3:30
4. "Blue, Turning Grey Over You" (Fats Waller, Andy Razaf) – 3:50
5. "Skylark" (Hoagy Carmichael, Johnny Mercer) – 6:15
6. "Battle Cry" (Clifford L. Waite) – 0:59
7. "Ain't Gonna Give Nobody None of This Jelly Roll" (Spencer Williams) – 4:12
8. "In a Sentimental Mood" (Duke Ellington) – 4:11
9. "I'm Gonna Sit Right Down and Write Myself a Letter" (Fred E. Ahlert, Joe Young) – 4:29
10. "Stardust" (Carmichael) – 6:18
11. "The Memphis Blues" (W. C. Handy) – 5:24
12. "Some Day You'll Be Sorry" (Louis Armstrong) – 6:19
13. "Blues My Naughty Sweetie Give to Me" (Arthur Swanstone, Carey Morgan, Charles McCarron) – 6:57
14. "Ja-Da" (Bob Carleton) – 1:56

== Personnel ==
- Anthony Braxton – soprano saxophone, alto saxophone, tenor saxophone, bass saxophone, flute, clarinet, contrabass clarinet
- Stewart Gillmor – piano, cornet, valve trombone, flugelhorn, double bell euphonium, sousaphone
