= Saxonette (disambiguation) =

Saxonette may stand for:

- Saxonette, a soprano clarinet in C, A, or B which is also known as the 'Claribel' and 'Clariphon'
- Saxonette (motor), an (auxiliary) motor for bicycles and motorcycles fitted with them by Fichtel & Sachs
- Saxonette (bicycle), the model name of several bicycles and motorcycles powered by the (auxiliary) motor of the same name. Such bicycles or motorcycles were offered by manufacturers Allright, Bismarck, Brennabor, Dürkopp, ESWECO, Meister, Miele, Presta, or Wanderer by Fichtel & Sachs.
