= Arthur W. Lehman =

American musician (1917–2009)

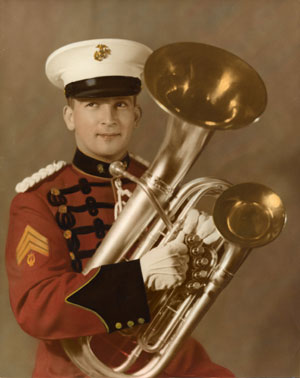

Arthur W. Lehman (September 24, 1917 – June 19, 2009) was a widely recorded American euphonium virtuoso and soloist. He was noted for having radically changed the way the instrument was technically performed, and was a major influence on euphonium soloists who followed him.

Lehman retired as euphonium soloist and section leader of the "President's Own" United States Marine Band in 1971 after twenty-four years of service. During his time with the Marine Band, he performed many solos that set the highest standards for euphoniumists who followed. Arthur Lehman was instrumental in changing the euphonium section of the Marine Band from playing the small-bore C.G. Conn Double-bell euphoniums of the Sousa Band era to the large-bore Boosey and Hawkes self-compensating euphoniums, which he demonstrated to be more functional and adaptable to modern performance practices.

== Early years ==
Art Lehman was born in Doylestown, Pennsylvania, and attended Penn State University, where he was awarded a B.A. in electrical engineering in 1940. Drafted into the United States Army upon graduation, although initially assigned to an aircraft factory based on his engineering background, Lehman wound up playing euphonium with an Army band from 1944 to 1946.

Having studied with Simone Mantia, soloist of the Sousa Band, in the summer of 1946, Lehman began studying euphonium with Harold Brasch, the noted euphonium soloist of the United States Navy Band. Lehman played with the Penn State Varsity Band and the Philco Band of Philadelphia during his studies.

Arthur Lehman was accepted into the United States Marine Band in 1947. Retiring with rank of master gunnery sergeant, Lehman also served as the band's personnel manager from 1956 to 1964.

Lehman's euphonium teacher, Harold Brasch had started using a bigger-bore Boosey and Hawkes euphonium during World War II, but the bigger-sounding British-made euphoniums didn't catch on with other American players until the middle 1950s with Lehman's solo performances during Marine Band radio concerts.

In the late 1940s, Lehman worked closely with the British Boosey and Hawkes musical instrument company to produce a set of five custom-made silver-plated "Imperial" model euphoniums which were used in the Marine Band for over half a century. One of these unique euphoniums is owned today by one of Lehman's former students, Glenn Call.

Always looking for a darker, more powerful sound, Arthur Lehman also developed the deep, large-bore parabolic-cup mouthpieces generally known today as the "Lehman Special," a radical change from the shallower cup-shaped mouthpieces of earlier euphonium soloists. With his performances on the Boosey and Hawkes euphoniums and his "Lehman Special" mouthpieces, Lehman is widely credited for transforming the typical American euphonium sound from the lighter continental sound of the John Philip Sousa days to the rich, dark and resonant sound common today.

== Later years ==
In 1969, Glenn Call, then euphoniumist with the Continental Army Band at Fort Monroe, Virginia, began studies with Arthur Lehman. It was at this time that Lehman began to meticulously formulate his euphonium playing techniques and put them down in a document that came to be called The ART of the Euphonium. These notes developed into a book published in the early 1970s by Robert Hoe, and later by the Tuba Press.

== Students ==
Call continued his lessons with Arthur Lehman through the 1970s after Call was accepted in the Marine Band. During this time, Lee Dummer, of the U.S. Army Band ("Pershing's Own") also studied with Lehman. Other enthusiastic Lehman euphonium students included Michael Ressler, Frank Noonan, Robert Palmer, Maureen Hickey and Tony Ciarlante. Arthur Lehman's final student – and official biographer – was retired FBI agent Keith Barton, whom Arthur gave his personal Boosey and Hawkes euphonium.

A member of the International Tuba Euphonium Association (ITEA), Arthur Lehman was a writer on euphonium technique and repertoire during the 1980s, through the early 2000s, appearing in professional journals and the internet. Following his years in the Marine Band, Arthur Lehman continued playing as a member of the National Concert Band of America. He retired from playing the instrument in April 2002 at age 84½.

== Notable quotes ==
"Remember that accuracy as well as speed are important. Don't lose sight of your pitch, meter, dynamics, tone or tongue!"

"Every note a Pearl!" ... always said with a knowing twinkle in his eye.

== Death ==
Arthur Lehman died June 19, 2009, at his home in Camp Springs, Maryland. He had pulmonary fibrosis. He was survived by his wife, Frieda.

== Books and articles written ==
The ART of Euphonium Playing, Volumes I and II, published by Tuba-Euphonium Press. (Not to be confused with The Art of Tuba and Euphonium Playing, a different book by Alfred Music Publishing).

- Euphoniumist Harold Brasch Remembered, an Article in Ten Parts, 2007
- Arthur Lehman Articles Online
