= Clarabelle (disambiguation) =

Clarabelle Cow is Disney cartoon character.

Clarabelle, Clara Belle, Clarabel, or Clarabell may refer also to:

- Clara Belle Baker (1885–1961), American educator
- Clara Belle Williams (1885–1993), American educator
- Clarabell the Clown, character from The Howdy Doody Show
- Clarabelle C. B. Lansing (1929/1930–1988), flight attendant and sole fatality in the Aloha Airlines Flight 243 accident
- Clarabel, a character in the Thomas the Tank Engine franchise
- Clarabel Trifle, a character from Duncall Ball's Selby novel series

== See also ==
- Claribel (disambiguation)
