= David Childs (musician) =

Welsh euphoniumist (born 1981)

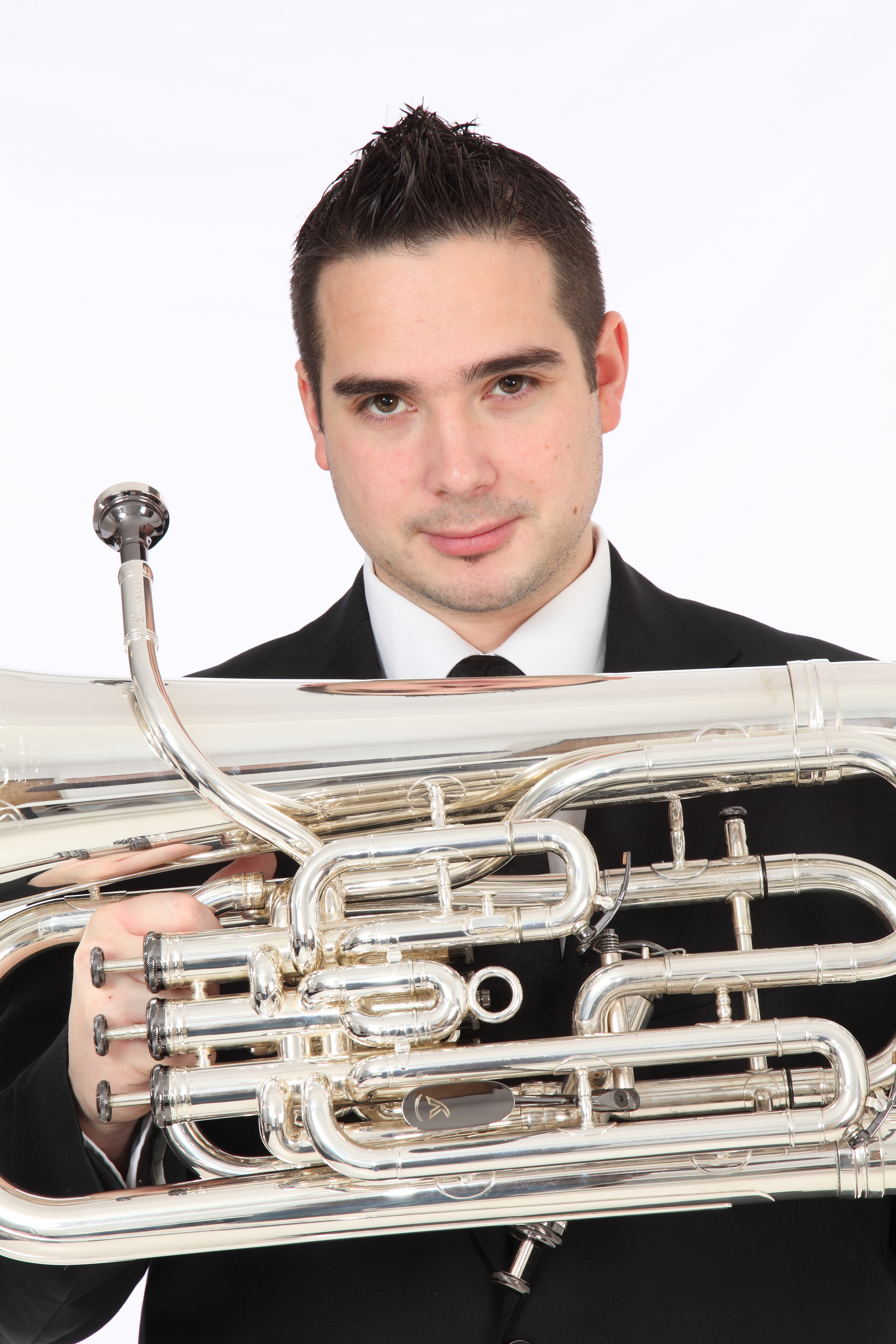
David Childs, 2010

David Childs (born 1981, Grimethorpe) is a Welsh euphonium soloist, recording artist, and brass educator. He is the son of Cory Band director Robert Childs, and nephew of Nicholas Childs, director of Black Dyke Band; both also accomplished euphonium players.

Childs has commissioned and premièred several modern works for euphonium. These include concertos by several composers, including Alun Hoddinott (The Sunne Rising – The King Will Ride, 2004), Philip Wilby (Concerto for Euphonium and Orchestra), Edward Gregson, Karl Jenkins, Paul Mealor, and Christian Lindberg (UK première). For his 2019 recording with Chandos Records and the BBC Philharmonic, Childs and the orchestrator Rodney Newton published an adaptation of the tuba concerto by Vaughan Williams for euphonium and orchestra.

Childs teaches euphonium and brass studies at the Royal Welsh College of Music & Drama, and in 2018 he succeeded Brian Bowman as professor of euphonium at the University of North Texas.
