= Elkhart Band Instrument Company =

Musical instrument manufacturer

- Type: Private
- Industry: Musical instruments
- Founded: 1923 in Elkhart, Indiana, United States
- Founders: Andrew Hubble Beardsley; Carl Dimond Greenleaf
- Fate: Dissolved
- Successor: Buescher Band Instrument Company
- Products: Band instruments

Elkhart Band Instrument Company was a musical instrument manufacturer in Elkhart, Indiana.

== History ==
The company was founded in 1923 by Andrew Hubble Beardsley (b. Dayton Ohio 25 September 1864; d. New York NY 10 October 1936), who was the president of Buescher Band Instrument Company, and Carl Dimond Greenleaf (b. Wauseon, Ohio 27 July 1876; d. Elkhart 10 July 1959), president of C.G. Conn, and who served the new company as secretary-treasurer. The company produced "Elkhart" branded band instruments as well instruments to be sold under merchandisers' brands ("stencil" instruments). Instruments produced by the company had an irregular assortment of features borrowed from the products of Conn and Buescher, partners in the consortium.

In 1927 the company merged with Buescher (some maintain that Buescher was purchased by Elkhart Band Instrument Company). When Beardsley died in 1936, the company was dissolved and Buescher used the Elkhart trademark for student line instruments until 1959.
