= Edna Dean Baker =

American educator

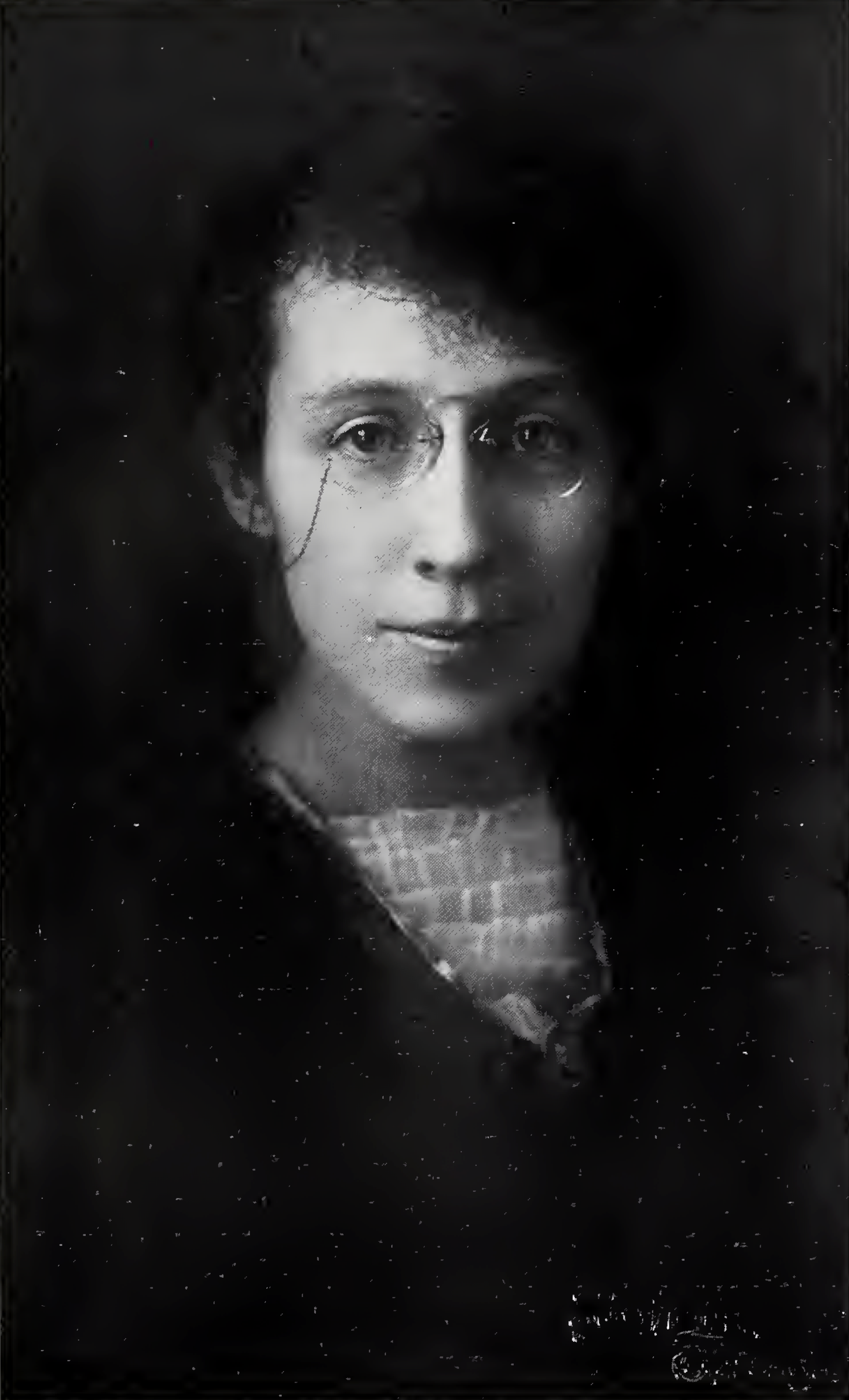
Edna Dean Baker

Edna Dean Baker (1883–1956) was an educator, author, co-founder of Baker Demonstration School, and President of the National Kindergarten and Elementary College (later to become National Louis University) from 1920 to 1949. She was an early advocate for kindergarten style early childhood education in the United States.

Born in Normal, Illinois, her family moved to Washington state when she was six years old. After graduating from Watcom High School in Bellingham, Washington in 1902, she moved with her family to Evanston, IL, where Edna entered Northwestern University as a Classics Major. In 1904 after her father's death. she transferred to Chicago Kindergarten College (Later the National Kindergarten and Elementary College) to pursue a career as a kindergarten teacher. She graduated with a Bachelor's in Education from the National Kindergarten College in 1913, and returned to Northwestern University to earn a bachelor's degree in 1920 and a Master's degree in 1921.

While pursuing her studies at the National Kindergarten and Elementary College, Edna and her sister, Clara Belle Baker, served as co-directors of the Evanston Elementary school, a private elementary school in Evanston, Illinois. Both would later co-found Baker Demonstration School as the demonstration school for the National Kindergarten and Elementary College.

Recognized in her time as a progressive educator, Baker was listed in Who's Who in America, Who's Who in American Education, Who's Who Among College Presidents, American Women, and Principal Women of America.

Baker was the author of several books, including The Beginner's Book in Religion, Parenthood and Child Nurture, Kindergarten Method in the Church Schools, The Worship of the Little Child, and A Child is Born.
