= Solo Piano (Standards) 1995 =

Studio album by Anthony Braxton
- Released: 1995
- Recorded: December 27, 1995
- Studio: Baby Monster Studios, NYC
- Genre: Jazz
- Length: 121:03
- Label: No More; No.2
- Producer: Alan Schneider

Anthony Braxton chronology
Ensemble (New York) 1995 (1995)	Solo Piano (Standards) 1995 (1995)	14 Compositions (Traditional) 1996 (1995)

Solo Piano (Standards) 1995 is a solo album by pianist/improviser Anthony Braxton recorded in 1995 and released on the No More label.

== Reception ==
Professional ratings
Review scores
Source	Rating
AllMusic	4/5 stars

The Allmusic review by Chris Kelsey stated "This is Braxton's first solo piano album, finally recorded after years of woodshedding on the traditional jazz repertoire. That it doesn't sound like any other pianist as much as it sounds like Braxton the saxophonist should not surprise anyone. Braxton approaches standards on piano in much the same way he does on alto. He doesn't just go "out" on the structure; he uses the chords, but he doesn't play patterns or contrived licks over them in the way a bebop player would. Every time he approaches a piece, it's as if he's playing it for the first time, using his accumulated knowledge to decipher just that specific composition's secrets. Braxton doesn't use the tune as a whole. Rather, he dissects the component parts, using the separate elements as material for his improvisation as he makes his way through the piece".

== Track listing ==
Disc one

1. " Variations on the Scene"(George Coleman) – 11:17
2. "Black Nile" (Wayne Shorter) – 7:15
3. "Sue's Changes" (Charles Mingus) – 7:25
4. "Along Came Betty" (Benny Golson) – 7:26
5. "Central Park West" (John Coltrane) – 3:36
6. "Straight Street" (Coltrane) – 6:15
7. "Duke Ellington's Sound of Love" (Mingus) – 8:11
8. "Dee's Dilemma" (Mal Waldron) – 5:19
9. "Pannonica" (Thelonious Monk) – 6:32

Disc two

1. "Remember Rockefeller at Attica" (Mingus) – 7:35
2. "April in Paris" (Vernon Duke, E.Y. "Yip" Harburg) – 5:18
3. "Orbits" (Shorter) – 7:00
4. "Countdown" (Coltrane) – 4:47
5. "Dee's Dilemma" [1st take] (Waldron) – 6:21
6. "Reflections" (Monk) – 5:03
7. "Skippy" (Monk) – 6:27
8. "Pannonica" [1st take] (Monk) – 7:25
9. "Milestones" (Miles Davis) – 7:51

== Personnel ==
- Anthony Braxton – piano
