= Clarabella =

Clarabella may refer to:

- "Clarabella" (song), a pop song composed by Frank Pingatore and recorded by The Jodimars
- Clarabella (organ stop), an 8 ft (2.4 m) organ stop with a clear flute-quality tone
- The Dutch and Italian names of the Clarabelle Cow fictional character from the Mickey Mouse universe

== See also ==
- Clarabelle (disambiguation)
