= Nicholas Childs =

Welsh musician and conductor

Nicholas John Childs (born 7 October 1961) is a Welsh musician, conductor, composer and brass educator.

Childs is known for his conducting of brass bands, winning numerous championships, his teaching at the university level, and his recordings of brass music. He is also the founder of two brass bands for children.

== Life and career ==
Childs was born on 7 October 1961 in Wales. He started playing baritone horn at a young age with guidance from his father John. Childs first performed with the Tredegar Junior Band and later the National Youth Brass Band of Great Britain.

At age 16, Childs became the Welsh and British Euphonium Champion. In 1985, he was voted International Euphonium Player of the Year.

Childs and his brother Bob toured internationally as the Childs Brothers. They debuted in Royal Albert Hall in 1984. His playing career included being Principal Euphonium at Grimethorpe Colliery Band and later the Foden's Band. Later performance appointments included euphonium tutor at the Royal Northern College of Music, Salford University and Huddersfield University.

Currently, Childs is the conductor and music director for the award-winning, Black Dyke Band. Under his baton, the band has won three European Championships.

Childs is married to Alison Childs, an administrator and brass instrumentalist. Their daughter Rebecca is also a baritone instrumentalist. His nephew, David Childs, the son of Robert Childs, is also a euphonium player, recording artist, and professor of euphonium at University of North Texas.

== Academic Awards ==
- Associate Royal College of Music (1995)
- Fellow of the London College of Music (1996)
- Master of Arts University of Salford (1995)
- Doctor of Musical Arts University of Salford (2002)
- Honorary doctorate from Leeds University (2006)
- Professor of music recording and performance at Leeds University (2009)
- Professor at the Senzoku Gakuen Tokyo, Japan (2014)
- Professor at the Royal Northern College of Music (2016)
- Fellow of the Royal Northern College of Music (2024)

== Discography ==
To date Childs has conducted one hundred and sixty commercial CD recordings. His works have received "CD of The Year" on multiple occasions by the British Bandsman, Brass Band World magazine and 4barsrest.

== Championships ==
Childs has won the following championships:

- Three European Championships
- Six National Championships
- Three British Open Championships
- Six Scottish Open Championships
- Six Norwegian National Championships
- Nine Scottish Championships
- Thirty-Four Regional Championships
- Four English Championships
- One French National Championships
- One Swedish National Championships
- Three Grand Shields
- One All-England International Championships
- One Brass in Concert Championships

== Yorkshire Youth Brass Band ==
Childs was the Founder of the Yorkshire Youth Brass Band. The YYBB is administered by Alison Childs.

== National Children's Brass Band of Great Britain ==
The National Children's Brass Band was the concept of Nicholas Childs, who is the music director since 2006. The band is for brass players from age 8 to 14.
