= Alfred James Phasey =

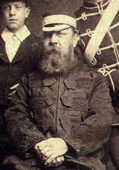
- Alfred James Phasey

Background information
- Born: 19 February 1834; Pimlico, England
- Died: 18 August 1888 (aged 54) Chester, England
- Genres: Concert band
- Occupations: Performer, arranger and conductor
- Instruments: Euphonium, Ophicleide, Baritone Saxhorn and trombone
- Years active: 1849–1888

Alfred James Phasey (19 February 1834 – 18 August 1888) was a British bandsman and tenor brass artist in the mid-nineteenth century. As a euphonium player, he was cited as the master of the instrument in his time.

== Life ==
Alfred J. Phasey was born in Pimlico on 19 February 1834 based on the records of the Royal Military Academy at Chelsea. He was the son of Pte. Thomas Phasey of the Grenadier Guards 1st Foot Guards.

On 12 September 1839, at the age of 5 years 7 months, he was enrolled in the Duke of York's Royal Military Academy at Chelsea. This was an early age for enrollment in this boarding school and in his biography of Phasey, John Roberts speculates that this might have been due to the death of his mother with his father being unable, due to commitments to the service, to raise him alone. In fact RMA/School records show that he was entered by his mother Elizabeth with his father abroad on service in Canada. He would remain at the RMA beyond his 14th year, the customary age at which students then enlisted in the service, not leaving until 12 February 1849, when he enlisted in the band of the Coldstream Guards. He would play ophicleide and trombone before baritone and eventually euphonium under bandmaster Charles Godfrey.

In 1853, as the baritone/euphonium voice became accepted in military and popular bands for the first time, Cadwallader Thomas became bandmaster of the Coldstream Guards. Phasey, in addition to finding a new instrument to play, euphonium, found a wife in Miss Elizabeth Hall. She was the daughter of John and niece of T.Hall, a watchmaker who had become the town band leader in her hometown of Banbury. She was two years his senior when they married in 1854.

They had three sons. The oldest, Alfred Jr., played euphonium with the Gilmore Band in the United States and ultimately assumed his father's many musical responsibilities upon the elder Phasey's death. Son Handel Phasey was also a euphonium player.

In 1859 or 1860, Alfred Phasey joined the faculty of the new Kneller Hall school, but was forced by his many other commitments to relinquish that post after only a few years. As a soloist, bandmaster and performer, he was very active in the London music scene and well known.

In 1887, Elizabeth Phasey died. Alfred began relinquishing assignments due to poor health in 1888 and died at Chester on 18 August 1888.

== Euphonium ==
In eulogizing Alfred Phasey, The British Bandsman credited him with not only the defining architectural modification to make the euphonium distinct from other tenor horns, but with choosing its name. As the tale set forth occurs in 1857–58, after the word had already been in use, this is open to some question. What is known is that after visiting the Paris exposition of 1857, Phasey began playing a baritone saxhorn made by the Antoine Courtois company. He modified the horn and ultimately devised a way of enlarging the bore while not compromising the pitch. This conical expansion of the baritone saxhorn, a cylindrical bugle or post-horn type bore, is the defining element that separates a true euphonium from a baritone horn.

== Career ==
Alfred Phasey began his musical career in the Band of the Coldstream Guards. While there, he became an accomplished euphonium artist and wrote an instructional method for the instrument. He also wrote one for trombone. Other groups with which he performed included the Crystal Palace Orchestra, on multiple instruments, from 1862 until 1888 and as a guest member of the private band of her majesty Queen Victoria. He performed as solo euphonium with the Blues and the Royals. As a touring virtuoso, he was a part of the "Courtois Union" for many years, playing on and promoting the company's instruments.

As a soloist, he was regarded by musical celebrities of his day such as Giuseppe Verdi as without equal on the euphonium.

Alfred Phasey also was employed as a bandmaster. He served in that role with the St George's 6th Middlesex Rifle Volunteers Band from 1868 to 1872. The Crystal Palace Company employed him to lead Phasey's Band, a popular music group, from 1879 until 1882, at which point they returned to financing strictly military bands. He served as the bandmaster of the Earle of Chester's Yeomanty Cavalry band from 1873 to 1888.

His written works included the 1860 Fantasia on Verdi's opera Attila, for Euphonium or Ophicleide and Pianoforte, the 1858 Instruction Book for Euphonium, and the 1858 Popular Instruction Book for Trombone.
