= Claribel Kendall =

American mathematician

- Born: January 23, 1889; Denver, Colorado, US
- Died: April 17, 1965 (aged 76)
- Education: University of Colorado Boulder; University of Chicago
- Occupation: Mathematician
- Awards: Robert L. Stearns Award

Claribel Kendall (January 23, 1889 – April 17, 1965) was an American mathematician.

== Education ==
Born in Denver, Colorado, Kendall received her Bachelor and Bachelor of Education from the University of Colorado Boulder in 1912. Kendall also went on to receive her master's degree in 1914 with a focus in mathematics. She studied mathematics in an era when women were increasingly seeking a college education and slowly beginning to move into math and science, fields that had traditionally been exclusively male. Her master's thesis was on “Pre Associative Syzygies in Linear Algebra."

While completing her master's degree, Kendall began teaching in the mathematics department at the University of Colorado in 1913. After receiving her master's degree, she began to work towards her doctorate. Kendall entered the University of Chicago as a student and spent several summers between 1915 and 1918 there*. In 1920 she received a fellowship from the University of Chicago to aid in the completion of her degree. She received her Ph.D. from the University of Chicago in January 1922. Kendall wrote her doctoral thesis on “Certain Congruences Determined by a Given Surface”, under Professor Ernest Julius Wilczynski. Kendall's work went on to be published in the American Journal of Mathematics in 1923.

== Career ==
Kendall taught at the University of Colorado Boulder from 1913 until her retirement in 1957, being promoted to full professor by 1944. Kendall directed ten master's theses at Colorado; eight of which were by women. Kendall was a member of the Christian Science Church. Kendall was also Secretary of the University of California chapter of Phi Beta Kappa for over 30 years. Kendall was also a contributor to the solutions of problems in the American Mathematical Monthly.

== Awards ==
Kendall was the first member of the department to receive the Robert L. Stearns Award from the University of Colorado, Boulder for "outstanding service or achievement". She was also a charter member of the Mathematical Association of America and one of the founders of the Rocky Mountain Section of the MAA in 1917.
