= Buescher Band Instrument Company =

American musical instrument manufacturer

- Company type: Private
- Industry: Musical instruments
- Founded: 1888
- Founder: F. Augustus Buescher
- Headquarters: Elkhart, Indiana
- Area served: United States
- Products: Band instruments

The Buescher Band Instrument Company was a manufacturer of musical instruments in Elkhart, Indiana, from 1894 to 1963. The company was acquired by the H. & A. Selmer Company in 1963. Selmer retired the Buescher brand in 1983.

== History ==
The company was founded by Ferdinand August "Gus" Buescher (born Elk Township, Noble County, Ohio, 26 April 1861; died Elkhart, Indiana 29 November 1937). He accompanied his family to Goshen, Indiana and then to Elkhart in 1875. In 1876 he found employment with C. G. Conn's fledgling band instrument factory. By 1888 he was promoted to foreman. After being shown an Adolphe Sax model saxophone in possession of E.A. Lefebre in 1888 he produced Conn's first saxophone prototype. In 1890, while still employed with Conn, he began producing band emblems at home and was setting up his own shop. In the fall of 1893 he opened the Buescher Manufacturing Company at 1119 N. Main Street, which made band instruments and other metal products, in partnership with John L. Collins, a clothing merchant, and Harry L. Young, a salesman. In 1894 his company began production of saxophones, becoming Conn's main competitor over the following two decades. In March 1901 he patented a cornet unusual in that the valves were of unequal lengths. True Tone became the trademark name for band instruments made by the Buescher Manufacturing Company.

In 1903 there was a disastrous fire at Buescher's factory. In 1904 the business was reorganized and renamed the Buescher Band Instrument Company, reflecting its sole focus on producing band instruments. In 1916 Buescher sold a major share of his company to six businessmen including Andrew Hubble Beardsley. Buescher remained president until 1919 when Beardsley assumed that title. Buescher was vice-president and general manager of the company until 21 January 1929 when he resigned these positions, remaining on staff as a consultant engineer. In 1926 Buescher Band Instrument Company was joined with the Elkhart Band Instrument Company (some claim that Buescher was bought by Elkhart Band Instrument), a company founded two years previously by Beardsley with Conn's Carl Greenleaf as secretary-treasurer. The "Elkhart" brand was retained by Buescher for its second-line instruments after the company was dissolved upon Beardsley's death in 1936.

Though Buescher manufactured many kinds of brass instruments, the company was known primarily for its saxophones which competed successfully with instruments made by Conn and Martin. Buescher saxophones became distinctive with snap-in pads, patented by Buescher in 1921, and screw-in gold-plated Norton springs, introduced in late 1931. During the 1920s Buescher also made small numbers of tipped-bell soprano, straight alto, and straight tenor saxophones. In this period, noted saxophonist, Jascha Gurewich, an early popularizer of the saxophone as a classical concert instrument, undertook an extensive national promotional tour sponsored by Buescher and tied to Gurewich's vaudeville bookings. Buescher stayed true to Adolphe Sax's concept for saxophone sound into the early 1930s, gaining the favor of classical saxophonist Sigurd Rascher and those influenced by him. Buescher adapted its sound concept to the bigger, bolder sounds favored by dance orchestras and jazz musicians, modifying its Aristocrat model and releasing the model 400 "Top Hat & Cane" in 1940. The Aristocrat and 400 models remained popular with professional players through the early 1950s, until instruments with more modern keywork gained favor, and changes to Buescher's product line were coldly received. By the late 1950s, Buescher's production of professional-line saxophones was a small fraction of what it had been at the start of the decade. Buescher's presence in the professional saxophone market ended when it was acquired by the H&A Selmer Company in 1963, although a nominal "Buescher 400" model continued to be produced through the mid-1970s.

Buescher became the main supplier of student-grade saxophones to the H&A Selmer Company, producing the vast majority of such instruments marketed under Selmer's "Bundy" brand. The Elkhart line was continued until 1959, followed by Buescher's downgraded Aristocrat line as their offering in the student market. After Buescher was sold to Selmer, Selmer allowed the use of the Buescher trademark for products sold under Buescher's established distribution network. During the 1970s, the market position of the Buescher Aristocrat/Selmer Bundy model declined under competition from Yamaha's more up-to-date and more efficiently produced student instruments.

The Buescher brand was retired by Selmer in 1983. After the Conn-Selmer company was formed in 2003, it briefly used the Buescher brand name on some Asian-made saxophones.

The Buescher company also produced some flutes and clarinets between 1910 and 1920, the Saxonette (also known as the "clariphon" and the "claribel"), a clarinet with a curved metal barrel and a curved metal bell pitched in A, B♭, C or E♭. They were produced with the Albert system, and later with the Boehm system. Gretsch and Supertone were merchandiser-branded "stencils" of the Buescher Saxonette.

== Instrument models ==
=== French Horns ===
- Single French Horn
- Double French Horn (model 400)

=== Clarinets ===
- Buescher with oval logo HR, wooden and metal clarinets in Albert and Boehm systems
- Buescher True Tone (possibly Penzel Mueller stencils)
- Buescher 400 (Selmer era)
- Buescher Aristocrat B♭ (Introduced in 1963)

Note: The clarinet in the following five pictures may or may not have been made by the Buescher Band Instrument Company. The engraving on it shows the "American Professional" brand, for which Buescher was the retailer.

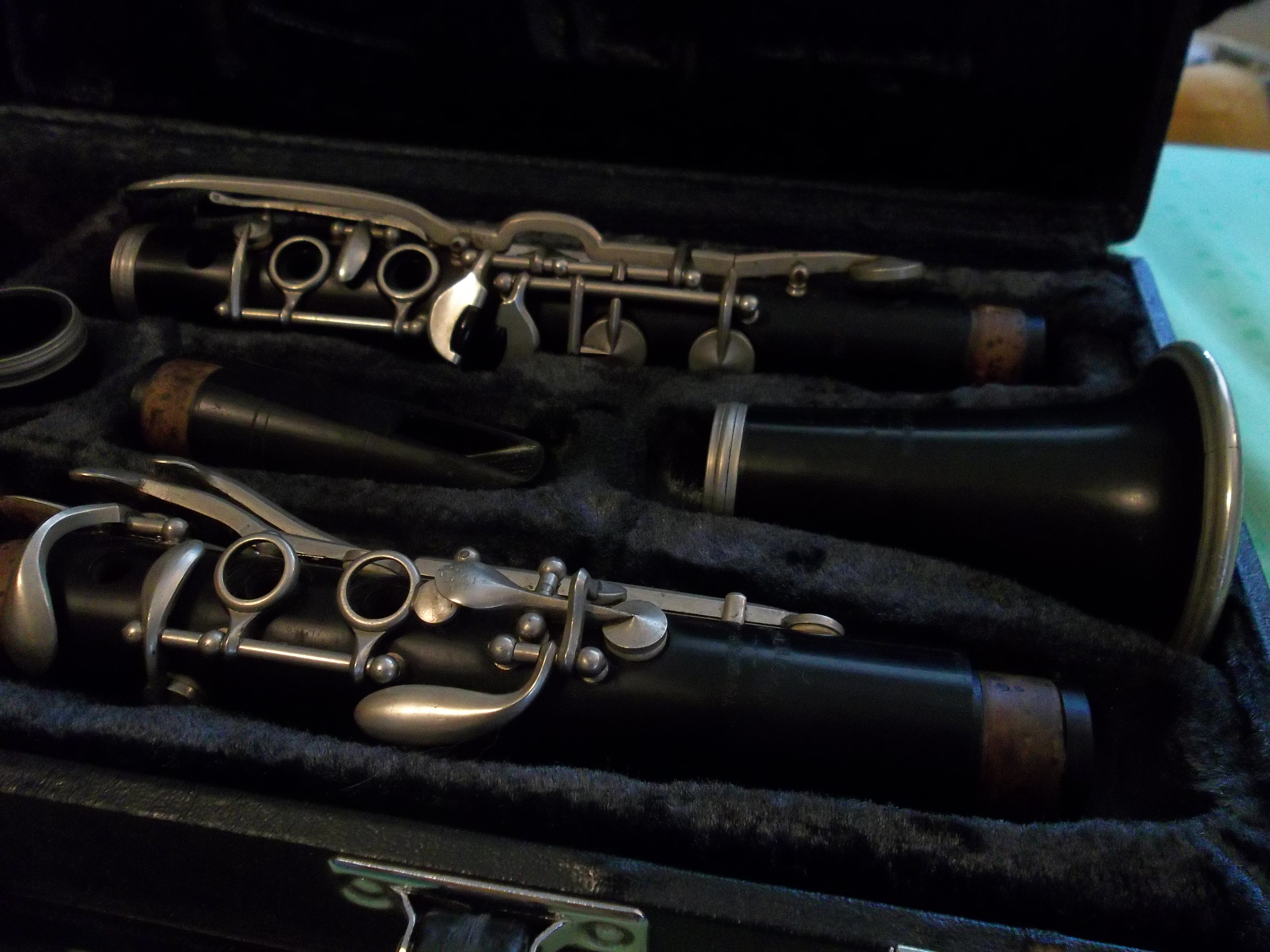
A 14-key Albert system clarinet branded "American Professional", believed to have been retailed by Buescher between 1910 and 1920

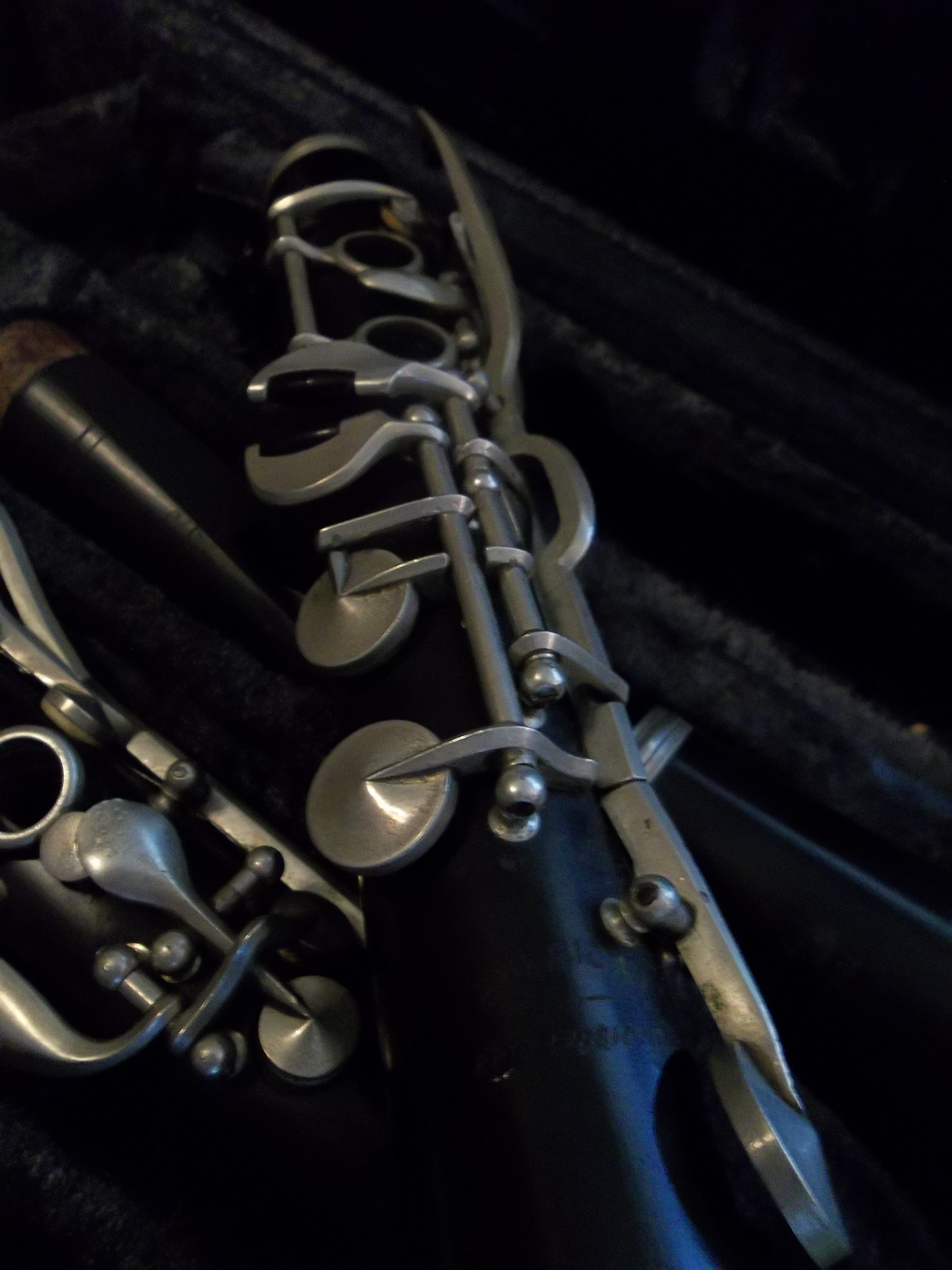
Lower section, showing two lower keys (rather than four as in the Boehm system), and two upper side keys (where modern clarinets have three)

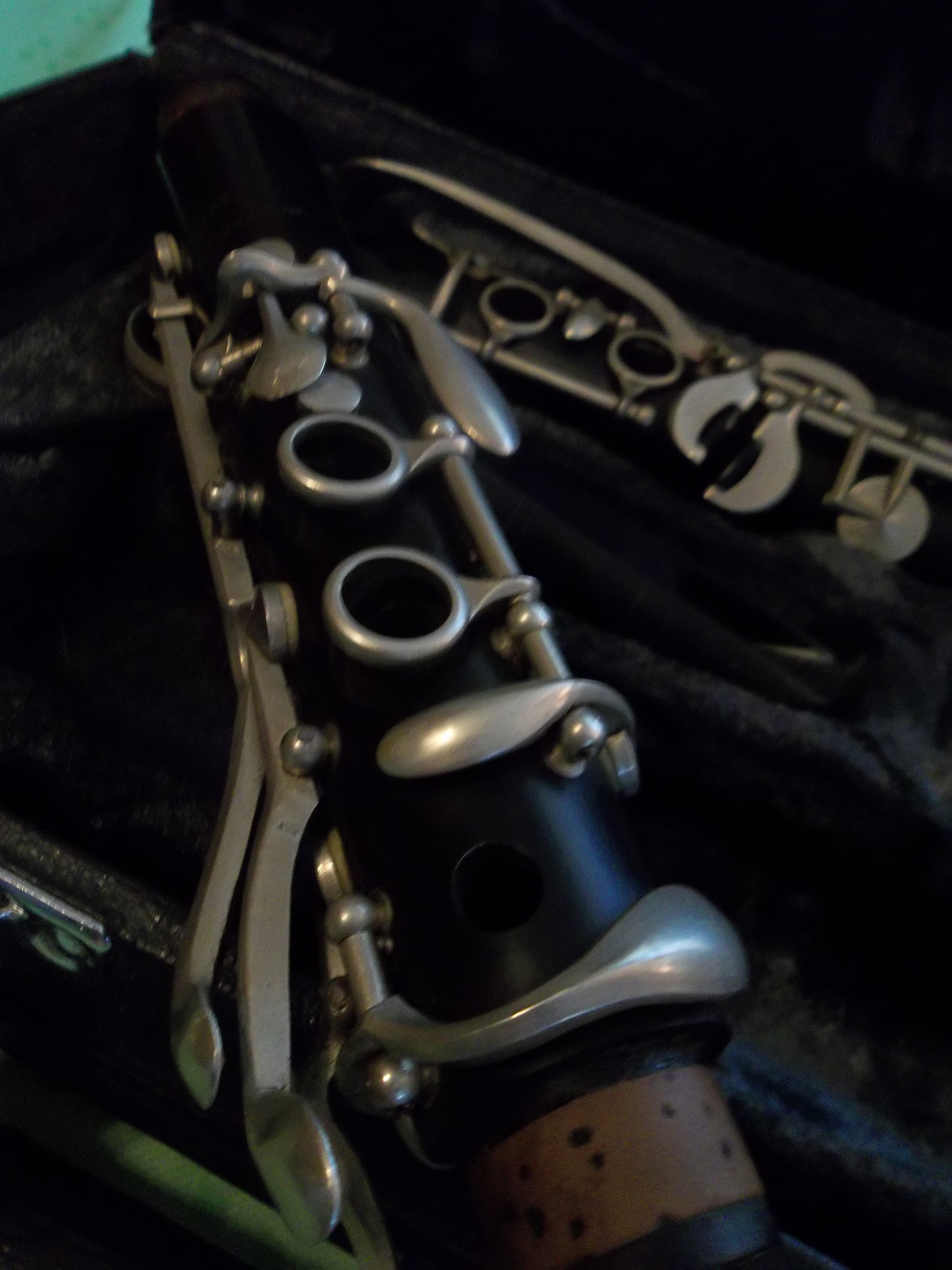
Upper section, with three side keys where modern clarinets usually have four

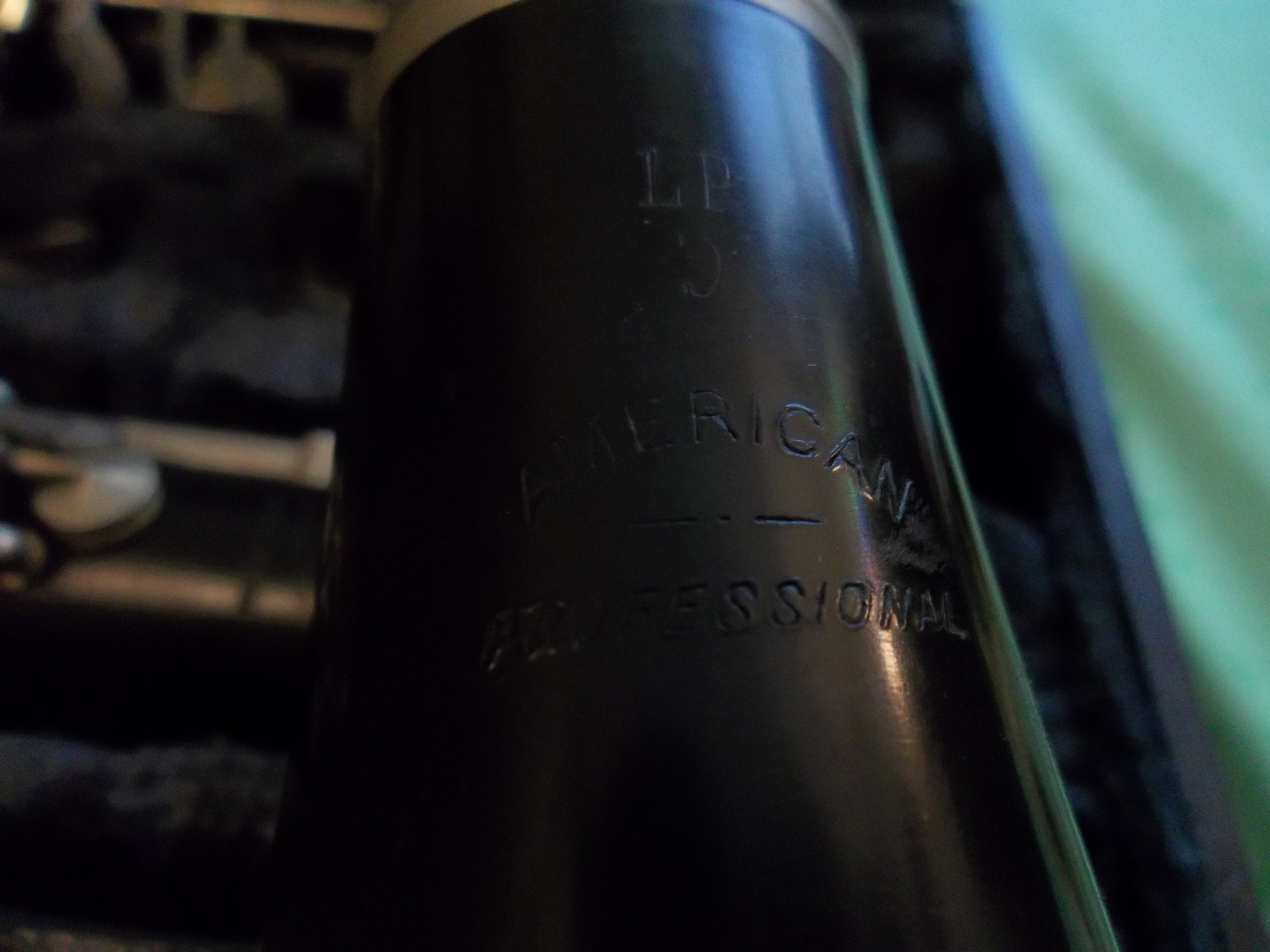
"American Professional" engraved on the bell. Just above that is a backwards "C" and the letters "LP", meaning "Key of C, low pitch", to indicate a C clarinet built to the A=440 Hz tuning that has since become standard

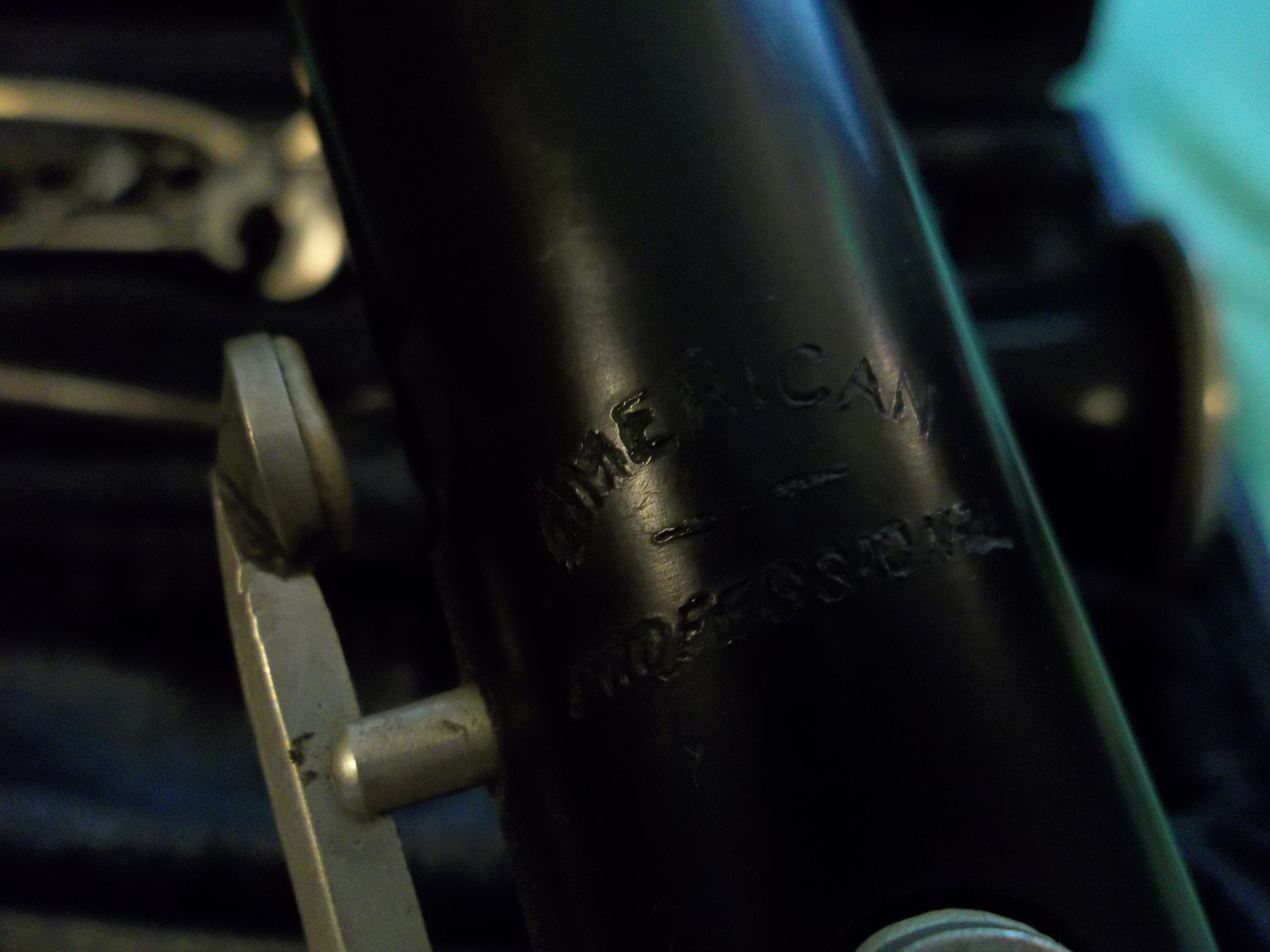
"American Professional" on the upper section, just below the barrel

=== Trumpets ===
- Buescher Truetone B♭ (professional): There were a wide variety of Truetone models, many of them custom made for professional musicians. Louis Armstrong recorded with a Buescher Truetone 10-22R in the late 1920s.
- Buescher Aristocrat: Before the Selmer buyout, this was a professional trumpet a step down from the Truetone. It was changed to a student horn after 1963.
- Buescher 400 Truetone: This was a more modern sounding trumpet, suited for big band jazz, that came in three models: brass with nickel trim; silver plated brass; and one in silver plate with sterling silver bell, called the Super 400.

=== Trombones ===
- Buescher Grand: Silver plated, with gold plated engraving on the bell
- Buescher 400: This model had a 12.7 mm (0.500 in) bore. Early examples had slanted braces on the bell section, and slide tubes that were offset by length, with the upper tube roughly 5 cm (2 in) behind the lower (thus making the end bow of the slide slanted as well). Later examples had straight braces.

=== Tubas ===
- Silver-plated military-band style upright three-valve B♭ tuba
- Silver-plated upright three-valve E♭ tuba with small-shank mouthpiece receiver
- Buescherphone (the company's tradename for its sousaphones)

=== Flutes ===
- Buescher 400
- Buescher special 2000

=== Saxophones ===
- Early models (1894–1931): evolving and sometimes concurrently produced designs without distinct model names; True Tone trademark (not instrument model) name adopted for instruments produced by the Buescher Manufacturing Company at an unknown date prior to 1904; "True Tone, The Buescher Mfg. Co., Elkhart, Ind." with bell/tuning fork logo engraved on bell on pre-1904 versions, "The Buescher, Elkhart Ind." engraved on bell and "True Tone" logo stamped on the rear of the body tube on post-1904 versions; all have split bell keys; early versions have double octave keys, metal key buttons and rollers, soldered toneholes, direct G♯ key action; single octave key, black hard rubber rollers introduced ca. 1905; drawn toneholes and mother-of-pearl key buttons introduced ca. 1916; concurrent production of drawn and soldered tonehole types into early 1920s(?); some examples from around 1920 reported to have (experimental?) elliptical cross-section body tubes; F-linked G♯ key action, snap-in pads introduced in early 1920s; front F key introduced in 1924 and standard by 1926; 4-roller LH cluster introduced in 1926; some straight altos and tenors, tipped-bell sopranos produced in 1920s; used by Sigurd Rascher 1930–1932
- New Aristocrat (1931–1934): alto and tenor only; screw-in gold-plated Norton springs introduced; LH cluster enlarged; neck options introduced; split bell keys, black rollers, "The New Aristocrat" engraving; used by Sigurd Rascher and briefly by Charlie Parker
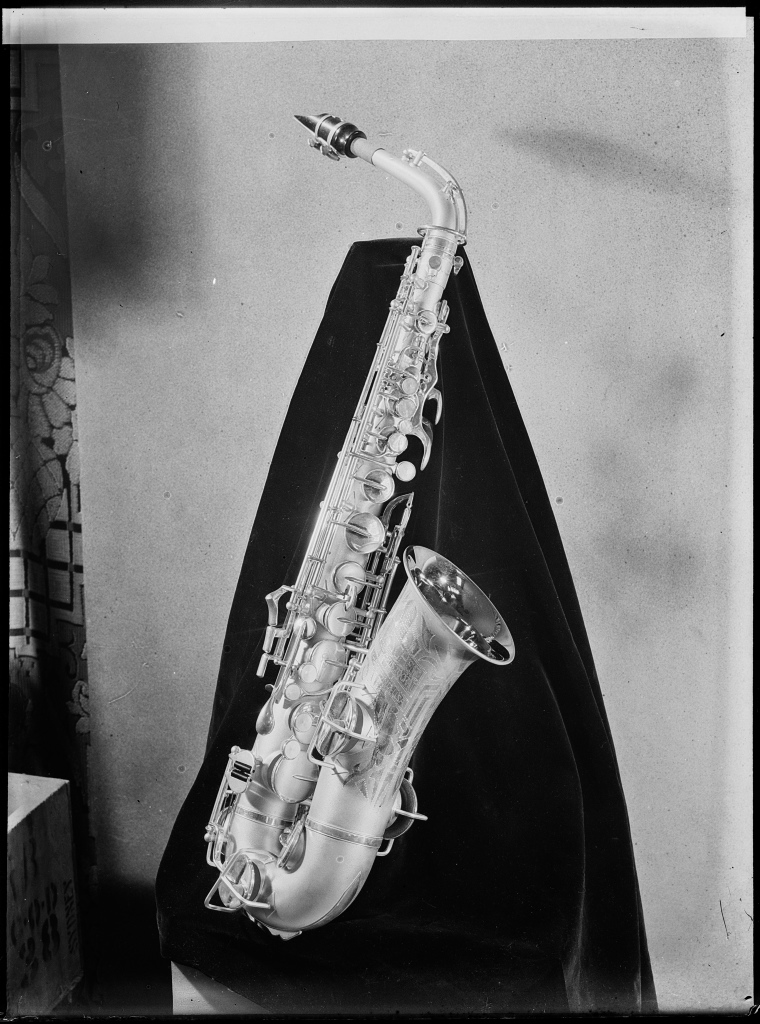
- Aristocrat alto saxophone
  Aristocrat (1934–1940): "The Buescher Aristocrat" engraving with art-deco design; left-sided bell keys replace split bell keys; previous model baritone continued to 1936 with new engraving; "Buescher" wordmark stamped on enlarged G♯ keytouch; yellow or tan rollers; referred to as "series I" by saxpics.com; used by Bud Freeman, Earle Warren, Ike Quebec, Elliot Riley
- Elkhart models (1936–1959): trademark name retained by Buescher after the Elkhart Band Instrument Company was dissolved; student models also marketed as various merchandisers' "stencil" brands and eventually as "Selmer Bundy"
- Aristocrat models 140 alto, 156 tenor, 129 baritone (1940–1955): "I-beam" cross-section key guards replace round wire guards (alto and tenor); neck and bore changed; "The Buescher Aristocrat" engraving; right-hand G♯ trill key and large engraved "B" logo until 1950; instruments with "B" logo and trill key referred to as "series II" and without as "series III" by saxpics.com; used by Johnny Hodges and Al Sears of the Duke Ellington orchestra
- S80 baritone (1955–63): nickel-plated keywork, right-rear facing bell keys; marketed as Buescher "Aristocrat" (1955–1959), Buescher "400" (1960–1963), and "Selmer Bundy"
- Aristocrat models 141 alto, 157 tenor (1955–1959): "The Buescher Aristocrat" engraving; nickel-plated keywork; right-rear facing bell keys; referred to as "series IV" by saxpics.com
- Aristocrat models S33 alto, S40 tenor (1960–63): left side bell keys, round wire key guards, simplified LH cluster mechanisms, simplified engraving; block-letter "Buescher" stamp replaces wordmark on G♯ keytouch; nickel-plated keywork; student model also marketed as "Selmer Bundy"; referred to as "series V" by saxpics.com; Pierret-built "Olds Parisian" type student saxophones also marketed as "Buescher Aristocrat" stencils during the "series V" period
- 400 model altos, tenors (1940–1963): all have extra-large bell, bell keys on right rear of bell tube, high post keywork, nickel-plated rods and hinge tubes, "Buescher 400" wordmark stamped on G♯ keytouch
- 400 models B7 alto, B11 tenor (1940–1958): silver bell flare ring; keys with body finish (lacquer, silver, or gold); bottom-pivot neck octave key; two-piece side B♭ key; brown rollers; "Buescher 400" in silver script soldered to bell; top hat & cane logo engraved on bell
- 400 models S1 alto, S20 tenor (1958(?)-1963): nickel-plated bell flare ring and keys; lacquer finish only; bottom-pivot neck octave key; two-piece side B♭ key; "The Buescher 400," top hat & cane logo engraved on bell through 1959; "Buescher Super 400" without top hat & cane logo engraved on bell, yellow rollers 1960–1963
- 400 models S5 alto, S25 tenor (1960–1963): no bell flare ring; nickel-plated keys; lacquer finish only; top-pivot neck octave key; one-piece side B♭ key; yellow rollers; "Buescher 400" engraved on bell
- Selmer "Buescher 400" (1963-ca. 1977): alto, tenor, and baritone non-professional models with large bell, no bell flare ring; nickel-plated keys; left side bell keys on altos and tenors, right rear on baritones; top-pivot neck octave key (some early examples with bottom-pivot); one-piece side B♭ key; white or yellow rollers; "Buescher 400" engraved on bell; block-letter "Buescher" stamp (no "400") on G♯ keytouch; also marketed as "Selmer Signet" intermediate model; Yanagisawa Model 6 soprano marketed as "Buescher 400" stencil for some period between 1968 and 1977; "Buescher 400" line discontinued ca. 1977
- Selmer "Buescher Aristocrat" (1963-ca. 1983): student model identical to the Selmer Bundy with exception of brand engraving; some examples with painted oval logo and lettering, ill-advised experiments with pads and other details from the late 1970s; switch to Aristocrat 200/Bundy II model with right side bell keys in 1978; "Buescher Aristocrat" line discontinued ca. 1983
- Conn-Selmer "Buescher" stencils (mid-2000s): "Buescher" brand briefly revived by Conn-Selmer corporation to market Asian-made saxophones; rationale for "Buescher" branding unknown
True Tone baritone saxophone, with soldered tone hole rings

Engraving on a True Tone C melody saxophone

True Tone stamping

=== Bassoons ===
- Model 3294
- Model 69

=== Baritones ===
- "Aristocrat" engraving, True Tone valves

== Sources ==
- New Grove Music Dictionary ("Buescher")
- McMakin, Dean "Musical Instrument Manufacturing in Elkhart, Indiana" (unpublished typescript, 1987, available at Elkhart Public Library)
- The Elkhart Truth, 29 November 1937, obituary of Ferdinand August Buescher
- Elkhart city directories (available Elkhart Public Library)

== See also ==
- Martin Band Instrument Company
