= Claribel Wheeler =

American nurse

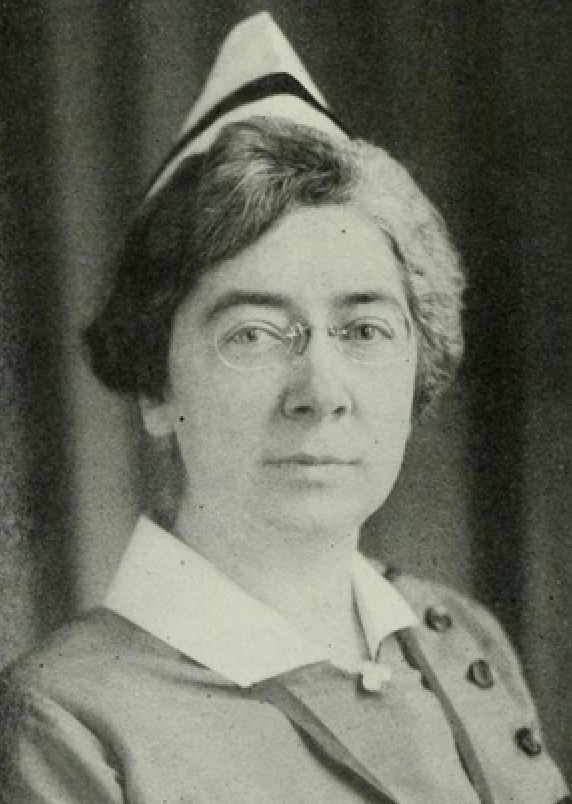
- Claribel A. Wheeler, from a 1921 publication
- Born: August 13, 1881; Prospect, New York, U.S.
- Died: December 8, 1965 (aged 84); Richmond, Virginia, U.S.
- Occupations: Nurse; educator; hospital administrator

Claribel Augusta Wheeler (August 13, 1881 – December 8, 1965) was an American nurse, educator, and hospital administrator. She was executive secretary of the National League of Nursing Education from 1932 to 1942, superintendent of the Washington University School of Nursing from 1923 to 1931, and president of the Ohio State Nurses Association.

== Early life and education ==
Wheeler was born in Prospect, New York, the daughter of Schuyler V. Wheeler and Lucia Augusta Kellogg Wheeler. She graduated from Vassar Brothers' Hospital in 1907, with further studies in hospital administration at Teachers College, Columbia University.

== Career ==
Wheeler was supervisor of nurses at Vassar Brothers Hospital beginning in 1908. She was principal of Mount Sinai Hospital School of Nursing in Cleveland, president of the Cleveland League of Nursing Education and the Ohio League of Nursing Education, and the Ohio State Nurses Association. In Missouri, she was superintendent of the Washington University School of Nursing from 1923 to 1931, succeeding Julia C. Stimson. She was active in the Sigma Theta Tau nursing organization.

From 1932 to 1942, Wheeler was executive secretary of the National League of Nursing Education. In this role, she spoke at conventions of state nurses associations in North Carolina in 1932 and 1937, South Carolina in 1933, Tennessee in 1935 and 1938, New York and New England in 1935, Georgia in 1937, and Alabama in 1940. She also spoke at nursing schools.

== Publications ==
Wheeler contributed articles to the American Journal of Nursing, and edited the Nursing Education Department feature of that publication.

- "The Educational Problem of the Small Hospital" (1917)
- "Value of Public Health Nursing Affiliation in Training of Student Nurses" (1919)
- "The Profession of Nursing" (1921)
- "Hospital Helpers" (1921)
- "The Function of the Private Duty Nurse in the Community" (1925)
- "Equipping a Nurses' Residence" (1928)
- "The Selection of Students for Schools of Nursing and Problems of Adjustment" (1930)
- "Let Us Look at our Clinical Services" (1935, with Blanche Pfefferkorn)
- "A Study of the Nursing Care of Tuberculosis Patients" (1938)
- "Lay Participation in Nursing Education" (1941)

== Personal life ==
Wheeler died in 1965, at the age of 84, in Richmond, Virginia.
