= Clara Belle Baker =

American educator (1885–1961)

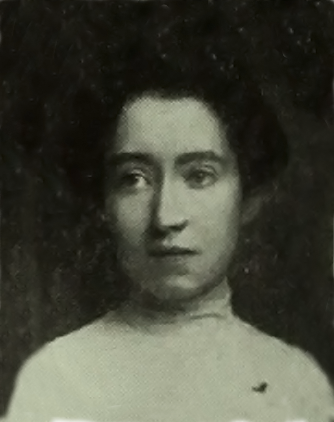
Clara Belle Baker, 1909

Clara Belle Baker (February 6, 1885 – May 5, 1961) was an American educator who was an early advocate of having children learn by doing.

Baker was the co-founder and director of Baker Demonstration School in Wilmette, Illinois.

== Early life and education ==
Baker attended Northwestern University, graduating with bachelor's and master's degrees.

== Career ==
With her sister Edna Dean Baker, Baker co-founded Baker Demonstration School and served as its director for many years.

Baker promoted the modernization of children's reading education; she was the author of many readers and other curricular materials for elementary students.

In 1921, Baker published Songs for the little child, a mixture of her own compositions and various folk songs, with music by Caroline Kohlsaat. The book was released through twelve editions and as of 2019 is still held by more than 100 libraries. She later collaborated with William H. Burton to produce the document Reading in Child Development.
