= Saxonette =

Type of soprano clarinet

A saxonette is a soprano clarinet in C, B♭, or A that has both a curved barrel and an upturned bell, both usually made of metal. It has the approximate overall shape of a saxophone, but unlike that instrument it has a cylindrical bore and overblows by a twelfth. The instrument is also known as the 'Claribel' and 'Clariphon'. First Produced by Buescher Band Instrument Company between 1918 and 1921 under the name Clariphone.

Saxonettes were first produced by the Buescher Band Instrument Company between 1918 and 1921 under the name "Clariphon". They are almost always simple (Albert) system, and most are in C. It is known that they were made in B♭, C and A, and Boehm system examples exist as well. The J.W Pepper company produced similar instruments at this time branded "Claribel".

A "Sax-Clarinet" appeared in the Couesnon catalogue of 1934. Couesnon instruments are amongst the most common instruments around today.

In 1923 the Gretsch Musical Instrument Company advertised a new invention called the Saxonette, which was identical to Buescher's Clariphon. There are some similarities with Buescher branded and Gretsch branded instruments, so the Gretsch may have been a stencil of the Buescher. Instruments have also emerged branded 'Supertone', a trade name of Sears, Roebuck & Company, which may also be stencils of Buescher or Couesnon. A Plateau-keyed B♭ instrument branded 'Abbott' was also produced.

Other than the barrel and bell, there is no difference between a saxonette and a soprano clarinet (of the same fingering system). In fact, some manufacturers sold instruments having both clarinet- and saxonette-style barrels and bells.

The curvature of the bell has little effect on the sound of the instrument. In particular, very few notes on a woodwind instrument vent through the bell, so its effect on most notes is negligible. Switching from a straight wood barrel to a curved metal one is more likely to influence the instrument's sound for several reasons: differences between metal and wood resonances, likely differences in variation of the cross sectional area of the bore, and differences in the player's embouchure due to the different angle of the mouthpiece with respect to the body of the instrument. It is possible that the projection of the instrument could also be improved. Perhaps the main reason for preferring a saxonette to a straight clarinet is visual: the saxonette looks distinctive and unusual.

The Saxonette achieved some popularity amongst the New Orleans style of clarinet players. Alphonse Picou was an adherent and can be seeing performing High Society on YouTube.

Curved bells and barrels have also been sold as aftermarket accessories.
