= Euphonium repertoire =

Set of available musical works for euphonium

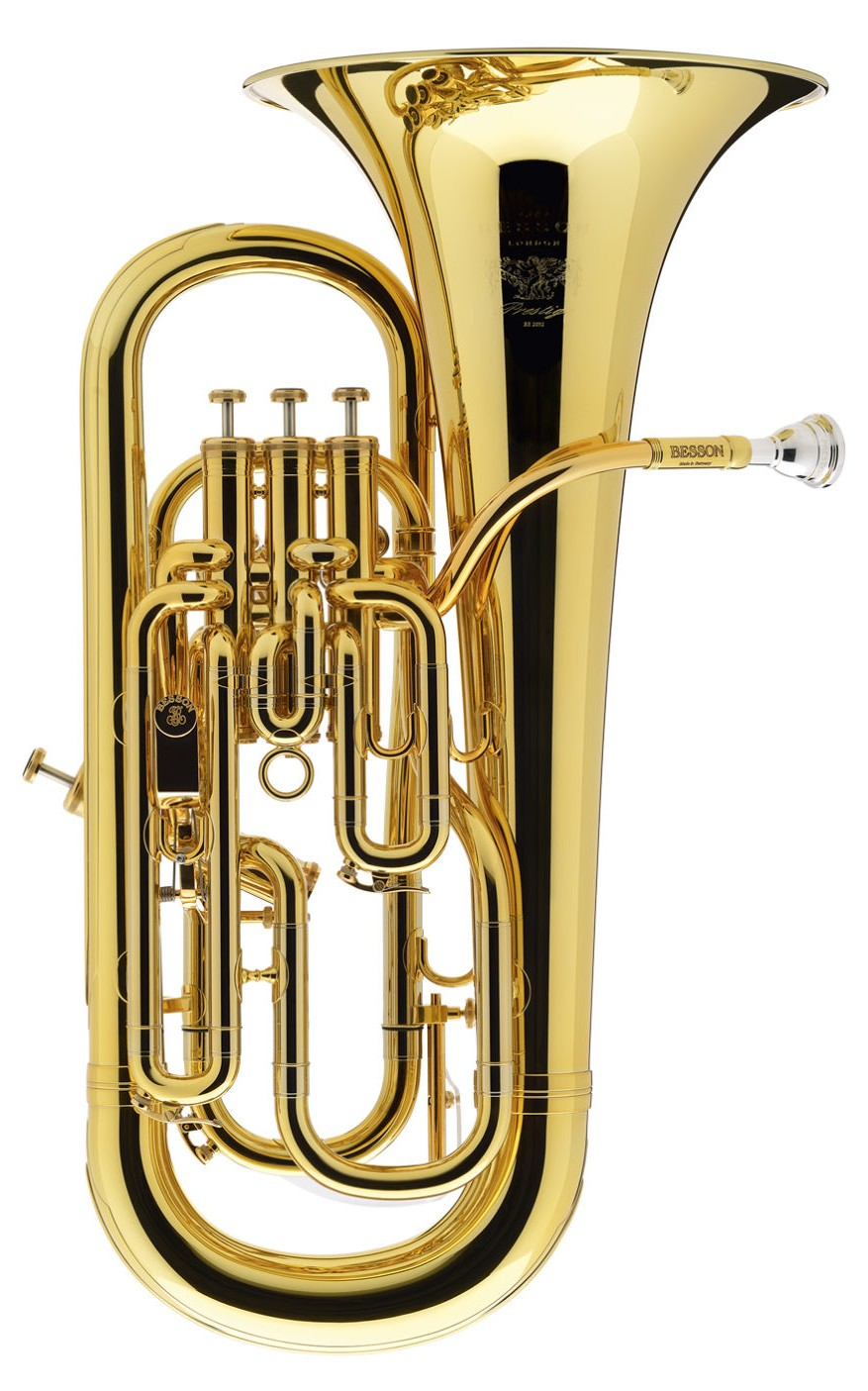
Euphonium by Besson, a professional model commonly used in bands

The euphonium repertoire consists of solo literature and parts in band or, less commonly, orchestral music written for the euphonium. Since its invention in 1843, the euphonium has always had an important role in ensembles, but solo literature was slow to appear, consisting of only a handful of lighter solos until the 1960s. Since then, however, the breadth and depth of the solo euphonium repertoire has increased dramatically.

== Ensemble repertoire ==
=== In bands ===
==== Historically ====
Upon its invention by Ferdinand Sommer of Weimar, it was clear that the euphonium, compared to its predecessors the serpent and ophicleide, had a wide range and a consistently rich, pleasing sound throughout that range. It was flexible both in tone quality and intonation and could blend well with a variety of ensembles, earning it immediate popularity with composers and conductors as the principal tenor-voiced solo instrument in brass band settings, especially in Britain. When British composers who had written for brass bands began to turn their attention to the concert band in the early twentieth century, they used the euphonium in a very similar role. Gustav Holst, for example, wrote very important solos for the euphonium in his first (1909) and second (1911) suites for band, and similar lyrical solos appear in many pieces from the 1920s and '30s by Percy Grainger and Ralph Vaughan Williams.

When American composers also started writing for the concert band as its own artistic medium in the 1930s and '40s, they continued the British tradition of using the euphonium as one of the principal solo voices. Arnold Schoenberg's Theme and Variations and Samuel Barber's Commando March, both from 1943, have extremely prominent, lyrical solos for euphonium; Robert Russell Bennett's Suite of Old American Dances (1949) has brief solos and very active technical writing, and "When Jesus Wept", the second movement of William Schuman's New England Triptych (1956) is largely a euphonium solo and lyrical duet for euphonium and cornet (arranged by the composer from the orchestral original which features bassoon and oboe). All of these pieces are still in the core repertoire of the concert band today, and these solos comprise the core body of euphonium excerpts.

==== Today ====
This is not to say that composers, then and now, valued the euphonium only for its lyrical capabilities. Indeed, examination of a large body of concert band literature reveals that the euphonium functions as a jack of all trades, at times doubling the tuba in octaves, at times adding warmth to the trombone section, at times adding depth to a horn line, and at times adding strength to rapid woodwind lines. In general, idiomatic euphonium parts tend to be very active, resting little and covering a wide range.

In many ways, the role of the euphonium in concert band writing has not changed very much in the last several decades; as a solo instrument, it is still as popular with composers as ever, and it still continues in its versatile, jack-of-all-trades role. The influence of the brass band tradition in euphonium writing is evident in the many euphonium solos in both brass band and concert band pieces by British composers Peter Graham, John Golland, Martin Ellerby, Philip Sparke and Gareth Wood; among contemporary American band composers, Robert W. Smith, David Maslanka, David Gillingham, Eric Whitacre, and James Curnow especially seem to enjoy using the euphonium as a solo instrument. The Gareth Wood concerto can be heard at archive.org.

=== In orchestras ===
Although the deficiencies of the ophicleide gave rise to both the euphonium and the tuba in the mid-nineteenth century, the tuba quickly gained acceptance as an orchestral instrument, while the euphonium did not. Though the euphonium was embraced from its earliest days by composers and arrangers in band settings, orchestral composers have generally not taken advantage of its capabilities. Nevertheless, several orchestral works in the standard repertoire call for a tenor tuba, a German Tenorhorn, (Note: This is not same as the English "tenor horn" in E♭, but rather an oval baritone horn in B♭ with rotary valves.) a Wagner tuba, or a French tuba in C. In these cases the composer's desired effect was that of tenor-voiced, valved brass instrument; the euphonium is usually substituted, either because the instrument is obsolete (French C tuba), unavailable (tenor tuba), or possibly undesirable (Wagner tuba).

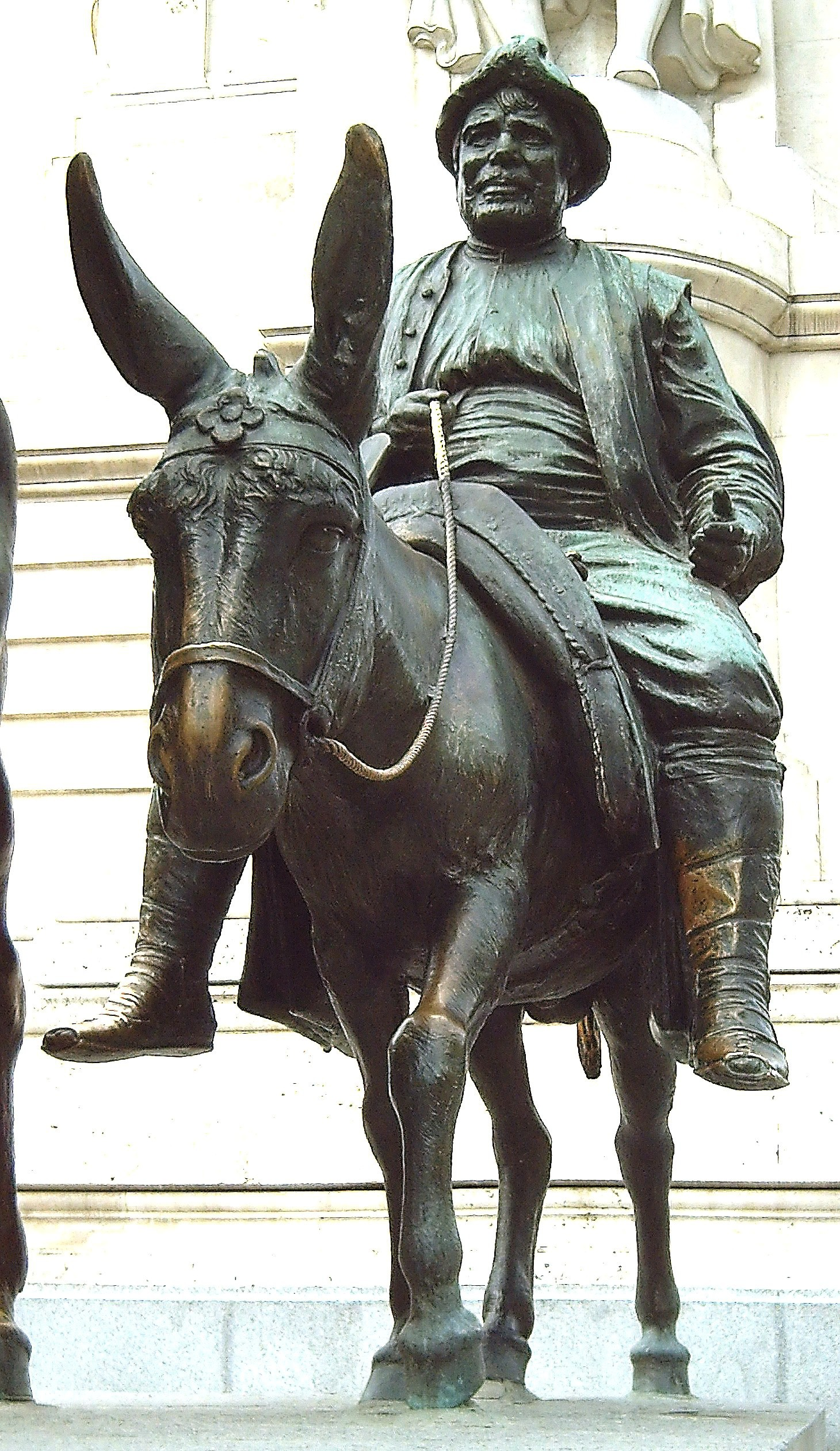
Don Quixote's faithful companion Sancho Panza, portrayed by a euphonium in Richard Strauss's eponymous tone poem

Chief among these examples are the tone poems Don Quixote (1897) and Ein Heldenleben (1898) by Richard Strauss, which were originally scored for Wagner tuba, but after their performance on Wagner tuba proved unsatisfactory, were rescored for euphonium with Strauss's approval. Gustav Mahler opens the first movement of his Seventh Symphony (1906) with a prominent solo for Tenorhorn. Gustav Holst used a tenor tuba in the movements Mars, Jupiter, and Uranus of his suite The Planets (1914–16). Finally, Leoš Janáček's Sinfonietta (1926) employs two euphonium parts, and his Capriccio employs a prominent euphonium part throughout. These parts, usually played on euphonium, are written in both a soloistic role and to function as part of the brass section.

Some British composers in the pre-World War II era, including Ralph Vaughan Williams, Percy Grainger, and Arnold Bax, wrote orchestral pieces with two tuba parts, understanding that the first part would be played on euphonium. Some composers have specifically calls for a euphonium. Among them are Dmitri Shostakovich's score to the ballet The Golden Age, Leonard Bernstein's Divertimento for Orchestra, and several works by the British composer Havergal Brian, the American composers Samuel Barber and Roy Harris, and the still-living Finnish composer Kalevi Aho.

== List of orchestral works ==
Following is a partial list of orchestral works which employ a euphonium (German: Tenortuba or Baritonhorn; Italian: flicorno basso)

- Béla Bartók – Kossuth (2 B♭ tenor tubas)
- Paul Creston – Chthonic Ode "Homage to Henry Moore" for large orchestra with euphonium, celesta and piano, Op. 90 (1966)
- Karlheinz Essl Jr. – Si! for tenor tuba (or trombone), live-electronics and surround sound (2012)
- Roy Harris – "When Johnny Comes Marching Home" (B♭ baritone)
- Gustav Holst – "Mars", "Jupiter" and "Uranus" from The Planets (B♭ tenor tuba)
- Leoš Janáček – Capriccio (B♭ tenor tuba)
- Leoš Janáček – Sinfonietta (2 B♭ tenor tubas)
- Giselher Klebe – Opera Die Ermordung Cäsars (B♭ Tenortuba)
- György Kurtág – Stele (2 B♭ tenor tubas)
- Luigi Nono – Prometeo
- Dmitri Shostakovich – The Golden Age
- Richard Strauss – Don Quixote (B♭ Tenortuba)
- Richard Strauss – Ein Heldenleben (B♭ Tenortuba)

== Solo repertoire ==
In contrast to the long-standing practice of extensive euphonium use in wind bands and orchestras, until approximately forty years ago there was literally no body of solo literature written specifically for the euphonium, and euphoniumists were forced to borrow the literature of other instruments. Fortunately, given the instrument's multifaceted capabilities discussed above, solos for many different instruments are easily adaptable to performance on the euphonium.

=== Transcriptions ===
The most common sources of transcriptions for euphonium are the cornet, vocal, cello, bassoon and trombone repertoires. In each case, one can see the common threads of ease of reading and performance: cello and bassoon both customarily read in bass clef, making them easily adaptable; vocal solos are naturally suited to the singing quality of the euphonium; and in playing cornet solos the euphonist may use the same fingerings that a cornettist would.

==== Cornet ====
Probably the earliest solos played on euphonium were cornet transcriptions, especially variations on popular airs, such as those found at the back of Jean-Baptiste Arban's Complete Method for Cornet. A little later, in the early twentieth century, the American cornettist Herbert L. Clarke wrote a body of virtuosic solos, including Carnival of Venice, Bride of the Waves, and From the Shores of the Mighty Pacific, that were and still are often performed on euphonium. In such cases, no adaptation or arrangement is necessary; a euphoniumist reads the original notation in B♭ treble clef, transposing down a major ninth, and performs the piece exactly as written, merely sounding an octave below the cornet.

==== Vocal ====
The large body of operatic arias, especially those for tenor or baritone, also provides an ideal source of literature for euphoniumists. Puccini's "Vissi d'arte" and "Nessun dorma" are often performed on euphonium, and German art songs, such as Schumann's Dichterliebe or Brahms's Vier ernste Gesänge, are also popular transcriptions, as is Rachmaninoff's "Vocalise", Op. 34, no. 14. In performing vocal transcriptions, some adaptation may be necessary, either because the tessitura is uncomfortably high or because the original key may present fingering or intonation problems.

Despite the prevalence of vocal transcriptions for euphonium, there remains much vocal work that is rarely, if ever, performed on euphonium, including Spanish, French, and German opera arias. The possibility of performing choral music in a euphonium ensemble is also intriguing, but not often seen.

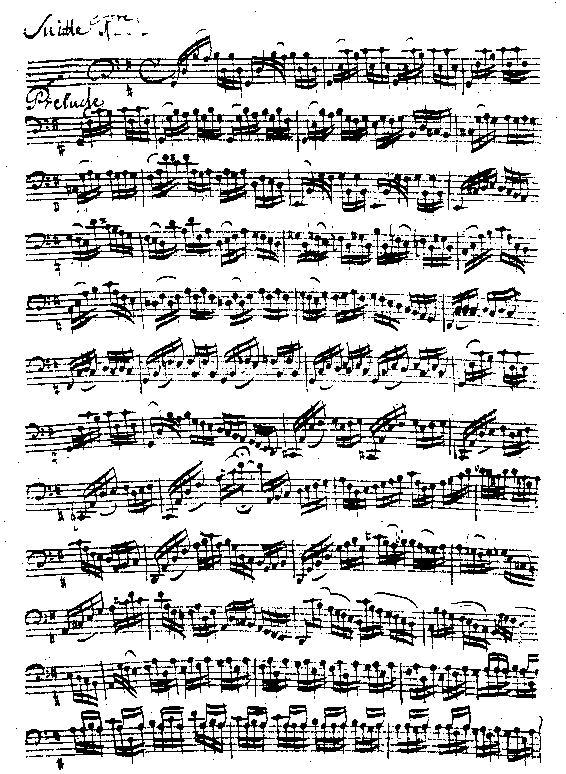
First movement of the first Bach cello suite in G major; the six Bach cello suites are often performed on euphonium.

==== Cello and bassoon ====
Another source of transcribed literature lies in the cello repertoire. Johann Sebastian Bach's six cello suites are a cornerstone of the euphonium's advanced repertoire and have been for some time; Leonard Falcone recorded two of the bourrees several decades ago in the first volume of his "Leonard Falcone and his Baritone" series. Two other cello pieces that are commonly played on euphonium are Benedetto Marcello's Sonata in F major, from the Baroque era, and Julius Klengel's Concertino in C major from the Romantic era. Of course, some adaptation is necessary when performing cello pieces, especially in the case of multiple stops and arpeggiated chords, as well as when considering the ease of technique in certain keys for cello as opposed to euphonium. A few bassoon pieces are regularly performed on euphonium as well, including Mozart's Concerto in B♭ major, K. 191 and Georg Philipp Telemann's Sonata in F minor. Some pieces work the other way round, including Joseph Horovitz's Euphonium Concerto, which is often played on bassoon.

==== Other ====
Recently, there have been attempts at playing more exotic pieces that are much more difficult to adapt for euphonium, as seen in Japanese euphonist Shoichiro Hokazono's recording of Astor Piazzolla's Six Tango Etudes, originally written for flute, and which, even transposed down a major ninth, pose severe range and technical difficulties for euphonium.

=== Original literature ===
==== French Conservatoire ====
One area of literature in which transcriptions and original literature coincide is what could be called the "French Conservatoire" style of writing, (Note: So called because many of the pieces in this style were either written for professors at the French Conservatoire National de Musique, or were written as contest or instructional pieces to be used for students at the Conservatoire.) dating roughly from the first half of the twentieth century and best exemplified by the composer Joseph Edouard Barat (1882–1963). Some of the pieces in this school were written specifically for trombone, such as Barat's Andante and Allegro (1935) and Alexandre Guilmant's Morçeau Symphonique (c. 1937), some for trombone or euphonium, such as Paul Veronge de la Nux's Concert Piece (1900), some for euphonium or tuba, such as Barat's Introduction and Dance, and at least one specifically for euphonium, Barat's Morçeau de Concours (1957).

==== Early 20th century virtuoso ====
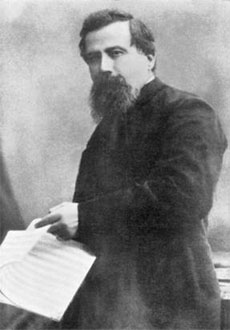
Amilcare Ponchielli, composer of the first original euphonium solo

The earliest surviving solo composition written specifically for euphonium or one of its saxhorn cousins is the Concerto per Flicorno Basso (1872) by Amilcare Ponchielli. Quite demanding technically, the piece mixes the styles of the Italian opera overture and of the quintessential nineteenth-century theme and variations. Following this, for several decades the only literature written specifically for euphonium was in the same virtuosic technical style as the cornet solos described above. Falling under this category would be Joseph Deluca's Beautiful Colorado (1924), Simone Mantia's Fantasia Originale (1909), and Eduardo Boccalari's Fantasia di Concerto (1906). In the 1930s, many euphonium solos were released in various band journals, in classic "theme and variations" setting were such classics as, "The Song of the Brother" (Leizden), "Song of Faith" (Ball), "Ransomed" (Marshall), and "We'll All Shout Hallelujah" (Audoire), as well as many others.

==== The new style ====
While British composers may have led the way in writing for euphonium in an ensemble setting, it was Americans who wrote the first of the "new school" of serious, artistic solo works written specifically for euphonium. The first two examples are Warner Hutchison's Sonatina (1966) and Donald White's Lyric Suite (1970), after which British composers followed suit with Joseph Horovitz's Euphonium Concerto (1972, one of the first euphonium concertos) and Gordon Jacob's Fantasia (1969). Two early very difficult works are Samuel Adler's Four Dialogues (for euphonium and marimba, 1974) and Jan Bach's Concert Variations (1978), both premiered by Brian Bowman. Two of the first unaccompanied solos for euphonium are the Mazurka (1964) by Nicholas Falcone, brother of early euphonium virtuoso Leonard Falcone, and the Sonata (1978) by Fred Clinard Jr. All of these works remain basic repertoire for the euphonium.

==== Today ====
Since then, there has been a virtual explosion of solo repertoire for the euphonium; in a mere four decades, the solo literature has expanded from virtually zero to thousands of pieces as more and more composers have become aware of the instrument's soloistic capabilities.

The euphonium literature from the past three decades has constantly "pushed the envelope" in terms of tessitura, endurance, technical demands, and extended techniques. To give only a few examples, James Curnow's Symphonic Variants (1984), now one of the classics of the literature, set new standards of range for the time, encompassing both D1 and F5. Roland Szentpali's Pearls (2000), written in a jazz/rock idiom, also uses a very high tessitura and contains extreme technical demands, while John Stevens' unaccompanied piece Soliloquies (2001) includes many wide leaps in range, both slurred and articulated.

Another segment of the avant-garde solo literature consists of those works for euphonium and recorded accompaniment, dating back to 1970, with John Boda's Sonatina for Baritone Horn and Tape. Since then, Neal Corwell, a euphonium performer as well as composer, has contributed many additional solos with synthesized, recorded accompaniment, beginning with Odyssey (1990). On the other hand, British composer Philip Sparke has written numerous euphonium solos (e.g. "Pantomime", "Song for Ina", "Harlequin") of a much lighter nature, though no less technically demanding. Unique works such as the war protest piece "One of the Missing (for those lost in Iraq" from the album The Chamber Wind Music of Jack Cooper have also brought the instrument forward to be used in a more divergent and compelling way.

There is a great lack in chamber music for euphonium (where it is not the exclusive soloist). Diálogo Sonoro ao Luar, or "Moonlight Dialogue," for alto saxophone and euphonium (published 1946) is a work written by prominent twentieth-century Brazilian composer Francisco Braga. Aside from its unique instrumentation, it displays technical and lyrical qualities of both the modern sax and euphonium. Between 2014 and 2017, Israeli composer Tamara Hiskia composed several pieces for euphonium which feature pioneering techniques: Rhapsody and Fugue on Classical Themes for trumpet, horn, euphonium and tuba; Variations on a Theme by Paganini (La Campanella) in A♭ minor for euphonium and piano; Ballade "Genius and Fate" for euphonium and piano; and Trio for B♭ clarinet, euphonium or bassoon and piano. The ranges in these compositions are between 3 (Ballade) and 4.5 octaves (Trio). In 2024, American composer David Conte's Sonata for Double Bass and Piano was transcribed for Euphonium for Japanese euphonist Arisa Makita.

The use of euphonium as a solo instrument with orchestral accompaniment still remains limited. The earliest known composition of this type is Alan Hovhaness' Concerto No. 3 ("Diran, the Religious Singer") from 1948. Subsequent pieces include Rule Beasley's Concerto (1967), Hovhaness' Symphony No. 29 (1976), and the David Gaines Concerto (1987). Since then, an increasing number of professionally written concerti for euphonium and orchestra have appeared, including those by Jan Bach (1990), Jukka Linkola (1996), Vladimir Cosma (1997), Torstein Aagaard-Nilsen (2000), Alun Hoddinott (2002), Juraj Filas (2003), Uljas Pulkkis (2004), Kevin Hill (2004), John Stevens (2004), Rolf Rudin (2007), Lee Bracegirdle (2007), Tim Jansa (2009), and Karl Jenkins (2009).

==== Non-traditional settings ====
Thanks to a handful of enterprising individuals, in recent years the euphonium has begun to make inroads in jazz, pop and other non-concert performance settings. One of these individuals was Rich Matteson (1929–1993), who viewed himself primarily as a jazz musician who simply happened to play the euphonium. Together with two other euphoniums and three tubas and a rhythm section, he formed the Tubajazz Consort, which appeared in jazz clubs and at conferences worldwide to great acclaim. Today, jazz euphoniumists such as Marc Dickman carry on Matteson's legacy, and jazz euphonium competitions are held around the world.

The instrument is an essential part of the development of typical music genres in South America. The "Bombardino" is a truly star in Colombian genres such as the Porro or the Fandango. The living master of typical Colombian euphonium is Ramón Benitez. In Brazil, the instrument is part of the development of the very first typical music genre in Brazil, the Choro (from 19th century onwards). Choro is a virtuoso and counterpointing instrumental genre of light music, called sometimes as "street chamber music".

In addition, euphoniumists like Lance LaDuke and Matthew Murchison have recently explored and recorded the euphonium in non-traditional performance situations. LaDuke, in his CD Take a Walk, uses euphonium in a variety of quasi-country, comedic song settings as well as in his recording of Sam Pilafian's Relentless Grooves: Armenia, which uses a pre-recorded accompaniment and treats the solo euphonium almost as an Armenian folk instrument. Murchison has released a recording of traditional euphonium repertoire but has also formed, along with his wife and others, the world music group Mainspring, in which, Murchison's website says, "A typical concert may consist of traditional jigs and reels from Scotland and Ireland, beautiful Mexican serenades, sambas, a suite of Spanish folk music, an Armenian lament, entertaining original music, and always plenty of light-hearted fun!"
