= List of euphonium players =

This is a list of notable players of the euphonium. Although modern performers and composers are pushing the boundaries of the instrument into other genres, the euphonium remains predominantly a band instrument. Full-time professional positions are almost entirely with military bands. This has not deterred new players from learning the instrument, partly due to the increasing worldwide popularity of British brass bands.

Country	Name	Dates	Biography
(United States)	Brian Bowman	1946–	A former soloist with the United States Navy Band, United States Air Force Band, and the Bicentennial Band. He retired as Regent's Professor of Music (Euphonium) in the University of North Texas College of Music (UNT) in 2018 following 19 years of service.
(United States)	Tyrone Breuninger	1939–2012	A former trombonist in the Philadelphia Orchestra, was solo euphonium and assistant conductor of the Atlantic Brass Band, and professor of euphonium at Rowan University.
(United Kingdom)	David Childs	1981–	Recording artist, professor of euphonium at University of North Texas, and nephew of Nicholas Childs.
(United Kingdom)	Nicholas Childs	1961–	Music director of the Black Dyke Band, Fellow of the Royal Northern College of Music.
(United States)	Colonel Michael J. Colburn	1964–	Former player with the "President's Own" United States Marine Band (1987–2004) and its Director of Music (2004–2014). Teaching positions at Butler University and University of Vermont.
(United States)	Leonard Falcone	1899–1985	Solo artist, arranger and professor of euphonium at Michigan State University The annual Falcone International Tuba and Euphonium Competition at Twin Lake Michigan was established in his honor in 1986 to advance the art of Euphonium playing, sponsor new works for the instrument, and promote new talent.
(Japan)	Shoichiro Hokazono	1969–	Former soloist with the Central Band of the Japan Air Self-Defense Force.
(United States)	Arthur W. Lehman	1917–2009	Student of Harold Brasch and Simone Mantia. Euphonium section leader and very active Soloist with the President's Own United States Marine Band from 1947 - 1972. Instrumental in introducing the concept of large-bore, self-compensating Euphoniums to United States players. Developed the "Lehman Special" mouthpieces.
(United States)	Earle Louder	1932–2021	Former soloist with the United States Navy Band and New Sousa Band, guest soloist with many other groups. Former student of Leonard Falcone, professor at Morehead State University.
(Australia)	Alan Lourens	1966–	Australian euphonium recording artist, conductor, composer, and head of the UWA Conservatorium of Music.
(Italy) / (United States)	Simone Mantia	1873–1951	Soloist with the John Philip Sousa Band (1896–1903) — left the Sousa Band to join the Pryor Band.
(United States)	Rich Matteson	1929–1993	Groundbreaking jazz euphonium player, former faculty member at the University of North Texas, and founding member of the Tubajazz Consort.
(United Kingdom)	Steven Mead	1962–	Professional soloist, clinician for Besson / Buffet Crampon and professor of euphonium at the Royal Northern College of Music. Mead has made over fifty recordings of euphonium music.
(Japan)	Toru Miura	1948–	Co-founder of the International Tuba Euphonium Association, professor at the Kunitachi College of Music soloist and clinician.
(United Kingdom)	Alfred James Phasey	1834–1888	Accomplished player of the euphonium, ophicleide and other brass instruments. He is credited with widening the bore of the euphonium to improve the tone. He was an expert player playing with many musical companies and wrote a tutor for the instrument.
(United States)	Kiane Zawadi	1932–2024	Also known as Bernard McKinney, a jazz euphonium and trombone player, worked with artists such as Freddie Hubbard and Yusef Lateef.

== See also ==
- List of tubists
- Lists of musicians

== Bibliography ==
- Bone, Lloyd E.; Paull, Eric; Morris, R. Winston, eds. (2007). Guide to the Euphonium Repertoire: The Euphonium Source Book. Bloomington: Indiana University Press. ISBN 0-253-34811-0. Wikidata Q135963380.
- Herbert, Trevor; Myers, Arnold; Wallace, John, eds. (2019). The Cambridge Encyclopedia of Brass Instruments. Cambridge University Press. doi:10.1017/9781316841273. ISBN 978-1-316-63185-0. OL 34730943M. Wikidata Q136027509.
