= Mantia =

Notable people with the surname Mantia include:

- Bryan Mantia, drummer of Guns N' Roses and other rock bands
- Joey Mantia, American speed skater
- Simone Mantia, Italian/American baritone horn, euphonium, and trombone player
- Simona La Mantia, Italian triple jumper
