= Carol Jantsch =

American tuba player (born 1985)

- Jantsch in 2024

Background information
- Born: Carolyn Mae Jantsch; March 8, 1985 (age 41); Ohio, U.S.
- Occupations: Musician, professor
- Instrument: Tuba

Carolyn Mae "Carol" Jantsch (born on March 8, 1985) is an American tuba player. She is the daughter of a medical doctor and a Kenyon College vocal-music teacher, Nancy Jantsch. She began to study piano at age 6, and the euphonium at age 9. She took up the tuba in seventh grade.

== Life and career ==
Jantsch graduated from Interlochen Arts Academy boarding high school in 2002, and is a 2006 graduate of the University of Michigan. While attending university, Jantsch auditioned for the New York Philharmonic and The Philadelphia Orchestra. She was a semi-finalist for the New York tuba position. She won the Philadelphia position of principal tuba in February 2006, appointed by music director Christoph Eschenbach. She assumed the chair, full-time, with the 2006–2007 concert season. Jantsch was the youngest member of the orchestra for a time and is, according to National Public Radio, the first woman to hold a principal tuba chair among major orchestras in the United States.

In addition to the orchestra, Jantsch also teaches at Yale School of Music.

Jantsch is also a noted Ultimate frisbee player, and won a tuba-throwing competition.

== Awards and solo competitions ==
She has won:

- Potomac Festivals Tuba Artist Competition in 2005
- Leonard Falcone International Euphonium and Tuba Competition
- International Instrumental Competition Markneukirchen in Germany
- Arts Recognition Talent Search
- Young Artist Award from Interlochen Arts Academy
- Columbus Symphony Orchestra Young Musician's Competition
- Student Tuba at the Leonard Falcone International Euphonium and Tuba Competition
- Arnold Jacobs Mock Orchestral Tuba Competition (Arnold Jacobs was the principal tubist for the Chicago Orchestra for 44 years, 1944 to 1988)
- A Scholarship from the Music for Youth Foundation

== Discography ==
- Cascades (2009) - Carol Jantsch, tuba, Susan Nowicki, piano
