= Earle Louder =

American euphonium player (1932–2021)

- Born: July 30, 1932; Somerset, Pennsylvania
- Died: May 26, 2021 (aged 88) Morehead, Kentucky
- Genres: Classical
- Occupations: Virtuoso, professor
- Instrument: Euphonium
- Formerly of: New Columbian Brass Band

Earle L. Louder (July 30, 1932 – May 26, 2021) was a euphonium player, acclaimed by colleagues around the world as one of the finest virtuosos of all time on that instrument. He carried a Doctor of Music degree in Euphonium Performance.

== Career ==
Dr. Louder was a euphonium soloist with the New Columbian Brass Band as well as the assistant conductor and soloist with Leonard B. Smith's Detroit Concert Band. In addition to these roles he played principal euphonium and was the featured soloist with Keith Brion's New Sousa Band and The Cleveland Orchestra Blossom Festival Band.

He completed his undergraduate work at Michigan State University, where he studied with the renowned euphonium artist, Leonard Falcone. He earned his doctoral degree at Florida State University, and achieved the distinction of being the first person to complete the Doctor of Music degree in Euphonium Performance.

His career soared during his tenure with the United States Navy Band in Washington, D.C. For twelve years he played principal euphonium and was Head of the Brass Department.

After his time with the Navy Band, Dr. Louder served as Professor of Tuba and Euphonium at Morehead State University (MSU) in Kentucky. He held the title of Professor Emeritus at MSU.

Louder performed with the Bluegrass Wind Ensemble and for over 4 years was in charge of the baritone section for the All Ohio State Fair Band. He devoted many summers to instruction at the Blue Lake Fine Arts Camp in Twin Lake Michigan working with high school and younger players.

Louder died in hospice care on May 26, 2021, at the age of 88.

== Recordings ==
Dr. Louder has been featured on numerous recordings but never went into the studio to record a traditional CD. Mark Custom Records has released a series of three recordings of Dr. Louder taken from his personal tapes and compact discs of important times in his career. Dr. Louder is featured on several recordings of the Morehead State University Symphony Band under the direction of Dr. Robert Hawkins, Eugene Norden, and Richard Miles.

== Organizations ==
- Pi Kappa Lambda, National Music Honor Society - Initiated 1985
- Sigma Alpha Iota (Gamma Upsilon Chapter, Morehead State University), National Women's Music Fraternity - Friend of the Arts
- Phi Mu Alpha Sinfonia (Gamma Epsilon Chapter, Michigan State University), National Music Fraternity for Men - Alumni Member

== See also ==
- List of Euphonium Artists
