= Nicholas Falcone =

Italian-American musician, music educator, conductor, and marching band director

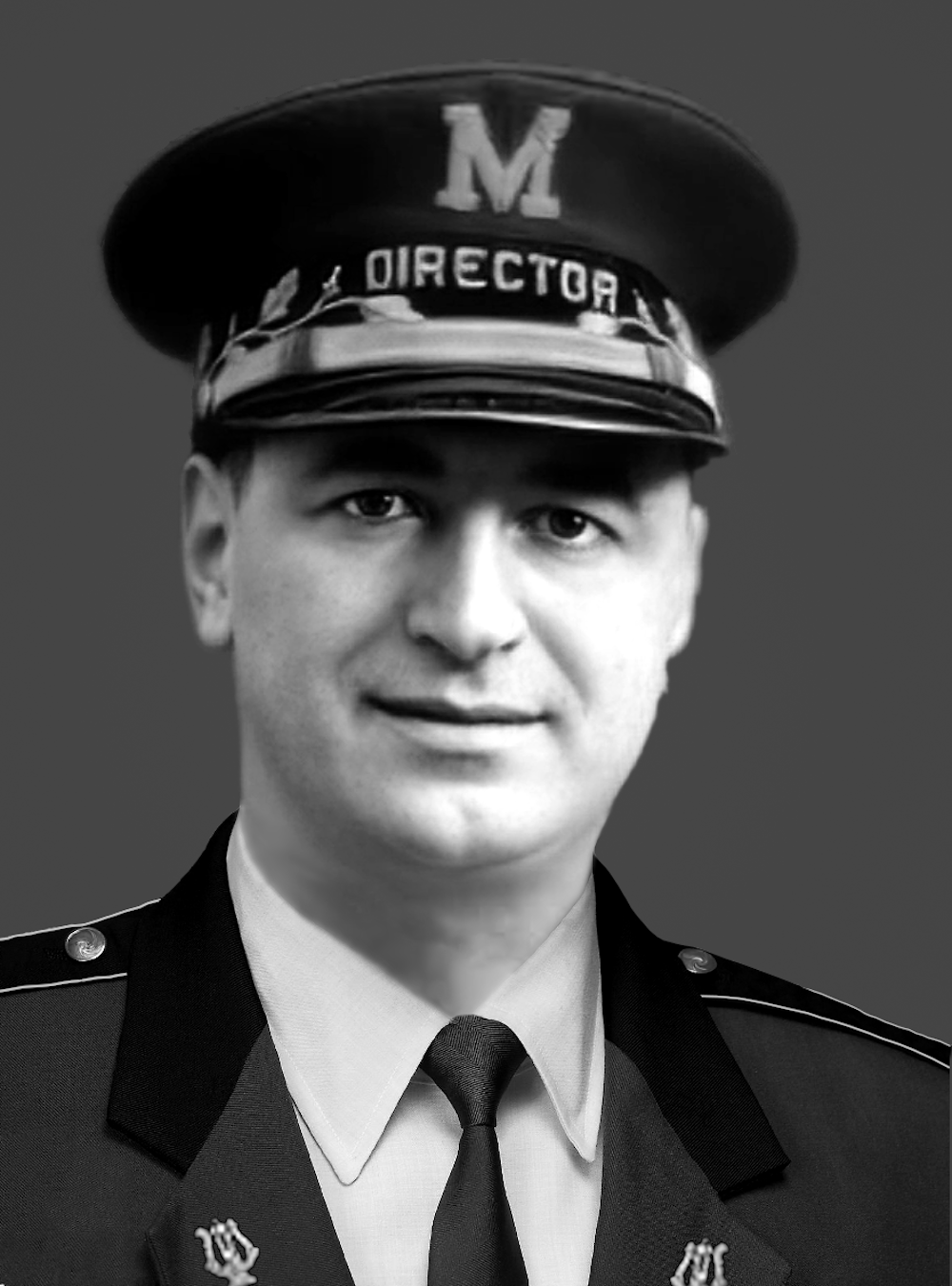

Background information
- Born: Nicholas D. Falcone; September 20, 1892; Roseto Valfortore, Italy
- Died: February 11, 1981 (aged 88) Ann Arbor, Michigan
- Genres: Classical; Marching Band
- Occupations: Tailor, musician, music educator, composer, conductor, marching band director, and factory worker
- Instrument: Clarinet
- Years active: 1911–1934
- Formerly of: Michigan Marching Band

Director of the University of Michigan Bands
- In office 1927–1935
- Preceded by: Norman Larson
- Succeeded by: Bernard Hirsch

Personal details
- Education: Roseto School of Music

Nicholas D. Falcone (/ˌfælˈkoʊˌniː/ September 20, 1892 – February 11, 1981) was a classically trained clarinet virtuoso who served as an educator, composer, conductor, and director of the University of Michigan Bands in the first half of the 20th century. He was also a soloist and assistant director of the Roseto Symphony Orchestra as well as a soloist with the Foggia Symphony in Italy, the Baltimore City Park Band, the Ford Band, the University of Michigan Symphony Orchestra, and the University of Michigan School of Music String Quartet.

== Early years (1892–1911) ==
Nicholas Falcone was born in Roseto Valfortore, Italy on September 20, 1892, to Dominico and Maria Filippa (Finelli) Falcone. Nicholas was the first of seven children born to his parents, including his brother, Leonard Falcone who became a talented baritone horn player, composer, and band leader; and four sisters, of whom two became pianists and two became singers.

Falcone was introduced to cavalry band music at age 2 while his family was traveling in South America. After returning home, he began studying music in earnest at age 5. He received music training at the Roseto School of Music in Italy.

Falcone worked as a tailor's apprentice in Roseto to help pay for his ongoing education. In addition to the instruction he received from Donato Donatelli and his son, Michelangelo, Falcone studied many years under Philip De Cesare and Rufus M. Arey. By age 19, he was conducting Il Trovatore for the Roseto Opera Company.

== A new home (1912–1925) ==
Falcone immigrated to the United States in 1912. Upon arriving, Falcone earned a living as a tailor first in New York City, and then in Ann Arbor until 1915 when he was hired to be the Director of Orchestras in Butterfield Theaters in Ypsilanti and Ann Arbor.

On November 12, 1918, while recovering from influenza, Falcone suffered a temporary and partial loss of hearing.

== 'M' man (1926–1934) ==
While enrolled in the University of Michigan School of Music in 1926, Falcone was placed in charge of organizing a freshman band. Subsequently, he was appointed as director of that band. Falcone then succeeded Norman Larson as conductor of the Michigan Band in 1927.

Falcone served as conductor of the University of Michigan Varsity Band, as the Michigan Marching Band was known at the time, from 1927 until 1935 and enjoyed a generally positive reputation throughout his tenure. Falcone wrote the "M Men March" (which he dedicated to Bob Campbell of the University of Michigan) and a medley of University of Michigan songs around 1927. Falcone spent the summer of 1929 studying under Antonio Vitadino in Rome.

By 1930, Falcone was serving as Director of the Varsity Band and Head of the Department of Band Instruments in the School of Music. Falcone was directing when the University of Michigan Varsity Band first performed a script Ohio formation in 1931.

In early 1932, Falcone's left ear went deaf. He took a short leave of absence in hopes of recovering but revealed that his hearing had been damaged by numerous severe colds he had had since the incident in 1918.

Despite protests in Ann Arbor and within the band's existing membership, Falcone allowed Black students to begin auditioning and joining the band in around 1933. For the first time, women were also allowed to join the band, though their participation was limited to Concert Band activities.

During a performance in January 1934, Falcone suddenly lost the hearing in his right ear, leaving him totally deaf. His brother, Leonard, was by then the Director of the Michigan State University Varsity Band. At Nicholas' request, Leonard also assumed Nicholas' duties at the University of Michigan while Nicholas took a medical leave of absence to seek treatment. Day-to-day management of the band was delegated to student leaders. This arrangement, approved by the University of Michigan, continued from January through June 1934. By the fall of that year, one of those student leaders, Bernard Hirsch, was appointed Acting Conductor and correspondingly provided a small salary.

== The silent years (1935–1981) ==
Though Falcone officially retained his position at the university through 1935, Hirsch continued to serve as Acting Conductor since Falcone recovered his hearing only briefly before becoming permanently and completely deaf. The university offered Falcone's position to William D. Revelli on August 26, 1935, while Falcone technically was still on extended, and now unpaid medical leave. Falcone formally tendered his resignation the following February.

Despite his lack of hearing, Falcone continued to compose and arrange music for years afterward as part of the Federal Music Project. He earned additional financial support for his wife (Thelma) and two children (Nicholas, Jr. and Mary) by working in an Ann Arbor factory. He died in his Ann Arbor home on February 11, 1981.

== Awards and honors ==
As part of the half-time ceremonies of the Michigan homecoming game on October 25, 1975, the University of Michigan Band Alumni Association presented Nicholas Falcone with an Honorary Life Membership Award. He was the third person to receive this award, following Revelli and Louis Elbel (composer of "The Victors").

The University of Michigan Board of Regents recognized him as Director Emeritus of University Bands in 1978.

The national music fraternities Alpha Epsilon Mu and Kappa Kappa Psi have both honored Falcone with life memberships.
