= Leonard Falcone =

- Born: Leonardo Vincenzo Falcone; April 5, 1899; Roseto Valfortore, Italy
- Died: May 2, 1985 (aged 86) Dimondale, Michigan, U.S.
- Occupations: Band director, conductor, music arranger, educator, musician
- Years active: 1927–1985

Leonard Vincent Falcone (Fal-CONE-ee) (April 5, 1899 – May 2, 1985) was an Italian-American musician, conductor, arranger, lecturer, and educator. He was well known as a virtuoso on the baritone horn, having extensively performed, written, and educated on the instrument. Falcone was best known as Director of Bands at Michigan State University from 1927 through 1967. During Falcone's tenure, the Spartan Marching Band expanded from a small ROTC auxiliary band to a large nationally known Big Ten marching band. Scholarship endowments at MSU and Blue Lake Fine Arts Camp were established in his honor, as was the Leonard Falcone International Tuba and Euphonium Festival.

== Early life and family ==
Born Leonardo Vincenzo Falcone in Roseto Valfortore, Italy on April 5, 1899. First playing Alto Horn and Violin, Falcone became active in the local town band in Italy. He studied multiple instruments and conducting under Maestro Donatto Donatelli in Naples in his teens. At age 16 Falcone followed his brother Nicholas, who had emigrated in 1912, to the United States. There he enrolled in the University School of Music in Ann Arbor, Michigan, which would eventually become the University of Michigan School of Music, where he met many of his lifelong professional and personal colleagues and friends. Nicholas followed professor Wilfred Wilson as Director of Bands at the school in the 1920s. Nicholas first hired Leonard as a tailor's assistant since he had found work as a tailor and theater clarinet player. Nicholas later hired Leonard again to play trombone at the Ypsilanti Michigan silent movie theater when Nicholas began conducting the pit orchestra. Leonard Falcone proudly became a citizen of his adopted country in 1924. Two years later, he would graduate from college with a degree in violin.

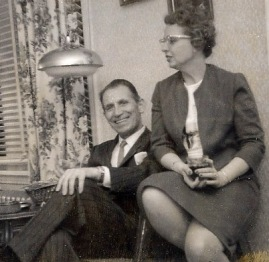
Leonard and Beryl Falcone around 1960.

Leonard married Betty Beryl Cromer (October 29, 1920 – December 5, 2015) of Kalamazoo on December 19, 1948. Beryl, as she was known, met Leonard while playing in one of his summer bands at MSU during her graduate studies. Leonard and Beryl had two children: Mary Beryl (August 6, 1950 – January 18, 2015) and Cecilia (b. May 25, 1952). They also raised their only grandchild Mary Lisa Fulton (b. September 3, 1968). For most of their marriage and until Leonard's death, the Falcone family lived at 519 Charles St. in East Lansing, Michigan.

== Michigan State University ==
In 1927 Falcone applied for and was awarded the post of director of bands at Michigan State College. At the time, MSC had roughly 2500 students and the military band (forerunner of the SMB) only 65. Because the Institute of Music and Arts, forerunner of the College of Music, was not formally created until the following year, he began as director of the military band, professor of wind instruments, and Italian.

As the programs grew along with the Falcone brothers' own reputations as bandmasters, both brothers also competed as prolific arrangers of music for concert band. In 1935 Nicholas lost his hearing and for a year, Leonard commuted between East Lansing and Ann Arbor, serving as Director of Bands at both schools. He was succeeded at U of M by William Revelli in 1928. He was the only person to do so at these schools (which are historic rivals) until the arrival of Kevin Sedatole, the current director of bands, who served as associate director of bands at Michigan previously.

Falcone enlisted in the U.S. Army Air Corps on September 23, 1942. He served eight months as a member of the Air Force Band at Maxwell Field, Alabama. He later organized the 388th Air Force Band at Stuttgart, Alabama. In Falcone's absence the MSC band was placed under the temporary directorship of Dale C. Harris. Falcone returned to campus for good on October 1, 1943.

During the 1940s, 50s, and 60s, Falcone expanded the role and performances of the band and established himself as a leading teacher and performer on baritone horn (and euphonium). Performances by the band at the White House, the New York World's Fair, and televised performances at the Rose Bowl parade in 1954, 1956, and 1965, along with the multiple recordings of both the MSC bands and Falcone on baritone, would bring his name and music at Michigan State onto the national stage. He was initiated as an honorary member of the Gamma Epsilon chapter of Phi Mu Alpha Sinfonia fraternity at Michigan State in 1940, an honorary member of the Zeta Epsilon chapter of Kappa Kappa Psi fraternity at Michigan State in 1972, and an honorary member of the Zeta Epsilon chapter of Tau Beta Sigma in 1978.

Falcone retired in 1967 and Michigan State bestowed an honorary doctorate on him in 1978. He remained Professor Emeritus of Baritone and Euphonium for the rest of his life. Falcone's career at MSU was pivotal in transforming a military auxiliary band of 65 into today's Spartan Marching Band, and building the MSU College of Music into a unit with hundreds of students and tens of thousands of alumni.

== Artist and teacher ==
Leonard Falcone toured as a solo artist for decades as well as publishing several solo recordings. Michigan State University owns the rights to these recordings and republishes them from time to time as baritone and euphonium students still seek them out. He was regarded by some as the 20th century master of the euphonium as Simone Mantia had been regarded before him. Many of those recognized by the Falcone Competition and other similar authorities as the current masters, either studied under, or under students of, Falcone. Brian Bowman, who acknowledged in an interview studying the recordings instead of studying with the man, was an oft-noted exception. Falcone's students include leading artists such as Roger Behrend, Earle Louder, and many others.

Falcone offered the facilities of Michigan State for summer youth music camps for many years and later assisted the Stansel family with making the Blue Lake Fine Arts Camp, a leading facility for the same. In 1941, at the urging of friends and colleagues in southeast Michigan who had formed the predecessor to today's Michigan School Band and Orchestra Association in 1934, Falcone hosted the Band and Orchestra Festival at MSC. These festivals became an ongoing annual event and also include marching band, solo, and ensemble festivals where thousands of Michigan schools and students compete at regional and then, if qualified, state levels where they are adjudicated by experts in the field each year.

Falcone rehearses Birmingham Seaholm HS on Schubert

Falcone wrote, lectured extensively, and presented many clinics on band technique and playing. He published lists of Euphonium repertoire and conducted master classes and clinics at music education venues such as the annual midwestern music conference. He enjoyed working with young people at Blue Lake and also often worked with high school groups as both soloist and clinician - rehearsing the groups with whom he would then play. Falcone continued to teach well after his official retirement in 1967 and maintained an office on campus until his death in 1985. Only months earlier, he had still been coaching a young student on Euphonium, planning an Italian tour for an alumni band, and working to arrange an oriental march for concert band. While the march arrangement was never finished, the alumni band did tour Italy the following summer.

== Death and legacy ==
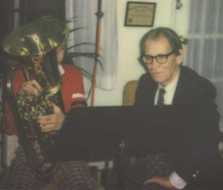
Leonard Falcone at roughly age 80 works with a young euphonium player.

Leonard Falcone died May 2, 1985, at the St. Lawrence Dimondale Center in Dimondale, Michigan. Among Falcone's final visitors, besides his family, were Spartan Marching Band alumni and students who sang and played to him. Former Spartan Marching Band director Kenneth G. Bloomquist visited Falcone the day before his death. Bloomquist recalled his final interaction with Falcone in Solid Brass:The Leonard Falcone Story: "He was very, very quiet, very tired - he had no energy at all. When he would talk I had to get my ear an inch or two to his mouth to hear him, and he whispered, 'Ken, why is this happening to me?'"

Falcone's playing, as well as his devotion to teaching and advancing the instrument, led his students to create the Falcone International Tuba and Euphonium Festival, which seeks to give a stage to new talent and future artists on his instrument and Tuba. Each August, the festival competition welcomes masters of the instruments and new students alike to Twin Lake, Michigan.

While still retaining some aspects of its military origins, the Michigan State University Spartan Marching Band lives on in the modern form established by Falcone, with most of its traditions and values deriving from his 1927 to 1967 tenure. The band has been seen by millions through its many performances on television and at major events, including performing for five sitting US Presidents.

Falcone left to the concert band movement a wealth of arrangements of classical orchestral and operatic music that he adapted to the instrumentation and timbre of the band as well as many military marches from cultures around the world adapted to modern western instrumentation. Michigan State University's marching band continues to play its iconic version of the MSU Fight Song, affectionately known to the band as "Falcone Fight". During his tenure at Michigan State University, the fight song was a very dynamic arrangement, ever subject to changes, as can be heard in the various recordings found throughout the University archives. The Spartan Marching Band now recognizes a specific one of his many arrangements as "Falcone Fight". (However, it also plays another variation, "Pregame Fight" arranged by former SMB assistant director, William Moffit, for pregame performance and as an in-game celebration.)

Falcone published many articles, solo literature repertoires, and even a beginning baritone method in two volumes co-authored with Birmingham Michigan teacher Arnold Berndt and published by Belwin. His most enduring publication, however, has been the recordings which live on today in CD and mp3 formats in many places both with and without the permission of Michigan State University.

His legacy to future musicians at Michigan State University has continued via the Leonard Falcone Scholarship, established by the alumni in 1967 and funded by many contributions as well as the proceeds from the legitimate sale of Falcone recordings.

== Partial discography ==
All recordings cited are in the collection of the MSU archives.

Songs of Michigan State College, Recorded Publications Co, Camden New Jersey / RCA Victor, 1955 {Band and Men's Glee Club}

~MSC Fight Song (Lankey / Falcone)
~Spartan Toast (Coleman)
~Michigan State Spartans
~O Clap Your Hands
~The Gallant Seventh (Sousa)
~MSC March (Marsalis / Bibo)
~MSC Shadows (Traynor / Finn)
~Close Beside the Winding Cedar (Amici / Brown)

Michigan State University Band, Volume 1, LPS-1232 Fidelity Sound Recordings, Redwood City California

~MSU Fight Song (Lankey / Falcone)
~Funiculi Funicula (Denza)
~Suite from Carmen (Bizet / Nicholas Falcone)
~Stars and Stripes Forever (Sousa / Hershey Kay)
~All America March (Taylor)
~MSU Shadows (Traynor / Falcone)
~March Electric (Creatore / Falcone)
~Pines of the Appian Way (Respighi)
~La Traviata, Prelude to Act 1 (Verdi / Falcone)
~Gallito (Lope)

Michigan State University Band, Volume 2, LPS-1245 Fidelity Sound Recordings, Redwood City California

~Army of the Nile (Alford)
~Pepita Greus (Chovi)
~Flag of Victory (Von Blon)
~The Black Horse Troop (Sousa)
~Noble Men (Filmore)
~The Gladiator (Sousa)
~Father of Victory (Ganne)
~The Dover Coach (Vinter)
~Puenteareas (Sautullo)
~Moto Perpetuo (Paganini / Nicholas Falcone)
~Inglesina (Dela Cese)

MSU's Leonard Falcone, Published by Michigan State University Spartan Marching Band Alumni in 1967 to raise funds for the Falcone scholarship

Michigan State University Concert Band at Birmingham Groves HS (Michigan) March 21, 1963, unpublished

~Marche Millitaire Frances, (Saint-Saëns)
~Carnival of Venice
~Overture to Italian in Algiers (Rossini)
~Corcoran Cadet March (Sousa)
~March: Nobel Men (Fillmore)
~Pepita Greus (Chovi)
~MSU Shadows and Fight Song together (Traynor / Lankey / Falcone)

Michigan State University Concert Band at Midland HS (Michigan) April 22, 1960, unpublished

~Procession of the Nobles from Milada (Rimsky-Korsakov)
~Mannin Veen (Wood)
~Jabberwocky (Walters)

Leonard Falcone and his Baritone, RE-7001 Golden Crest Records, Huntington Station, New York

~From the Shores of the Mighty Pacific (HL Clarke)
~Estrellita (M Ponce)
~Bourree 1 & 2 form Suite 3 for Cello (JS Bach)
~Beautiful Colorado (J DeLuca)
~Atlantic Zephyrs (G Simons)
~Piece en Forme de Habanera (JB Senaille)
~Morceau Symphonique (A Guilmant)

Leonard Falcone Baritone Horn, RE 7036 Golden Crest Records, Huntington Station, New York

~My Regards (E Llewellyn)
~Una Furtiva Lacrima (G Donizetti / R Harvey)
~Sentimentale (J DeLuca)
~Concert Piece (PV De La Nux)
~Allegro de Concert (E Cools)
~Andante et Allegro (JE Barat)
~Adagio from Concerto for Cello (J Haydn / D Shuman)
~Napoli (H Bellstedt)

Leonard Falcone Baritone Volume II, RE-7016 Golden Crest Records, Huntington Station, New York

~Concerto (G Magnan)
~Tarantella (WH Squire)
~Fantasia Original (Picchi-Mantia)
~Premier Solo de Concert (F Combelle)
~Platera (E Granados / L Falcone)
~Le Cygne (C Saint-Saëns)
~Blue Bells of Scotland (A Pryor)

Michigan State University Presents Leonard Falcone, Baritone Horn Volume IV, MSU-8984 Crest Records, Huntington Station, New York

~From the Shores of the Mighty Pacific (HL Clarke) Penn intercollegiate band, J Dunlop dir.(1962)
~O Solo Mio (DiCapua)
~Serenade (Schubert / Falcone) Penn intercollegiate band, J Dunlop dir. (1962)
~Ave Maria (Bach / Gounod / Falcone)
~Fantasie Original (Picchi-Mantia / Falcone) Royal Canadian Reg. Band, Capt. D Stannard dir. (1967)
~Flower Song from Carmen (Bizet / AA Harding) Pontiac HS Band, D Harris dir.(1958)
~Serenade (E Toselli)

Birmingham Seaholm HS Spring Concert, April 1961, Arnold Berndt directing, Leonard Falcone soloist, unpublished

~From the Shores of the Mighty Pacific (HL Clarke)
~Serenade (Schubert / Falcone)
~Rehearsal of the Schubert Serenade

(This recording is also in the collection of the Birmingham Historical Museum (MI))
