= Shoichiro Hokazono =

Japanese euphonist (born 1969)

- Born: December 4, 1969 (age 56); Kagoshima City, Japan
- Genres: Classical
- Occupations: Soloist, virtuoso, professor
- Instrument: Euphonium
- Formerly of: NHK Symphony Orchestra; Nagoya Philharmonic Orchestra; Osaka Philharmonic Orchestra; Sapporo Symphony Orchestra; Tokyo Symphony Orchestra; Tokyo Kosei Wind Orchestra

Shoichiro Hokazono (外囿 祥一郎, Hokazono Shoichiro; born December 4, 1969) is a Japanese euphonium player and soloist. He most notably played with the Central Band of the Japanese Air Self-Defense Force and plays on euphoniums made by Besson.

== Background ==
Hokazono studied at the Shobi Conservatory in Tokyo, Japan under Toru Miura, graduating in 1994. He then continued his studies under Kaoru Tsuyuki and Steven Mead.

== Career ==
In 1995, Hokazono appeared as guest recitalist at the International Tuba and Euphonium Conference (ITEC) held at the Northwestern University in Chicago, Illinois.

Throughout his career, Hokazono has played with several orchestral groups, including the NHK Symphony Orchestra, Osaka Philharmonic Orchestra, Sapporo Symphony Orchestra, Strasbourg Orchestra, Tokyo Symphony Orchestra, and the Tokyo Kosei Wind Orchestra.

Hokazono played solo euphonium in the Japan Air Self Defense Force Central Band before retiring in March 2013. He is also a professor at Senzoku Gakuen College of Music and at Soai University.
