= Divertimento (Bernstein) =

1980 composition by Leonard Bernstein

Divertimento for Orchestra
- Suite by Leonard Bernstein
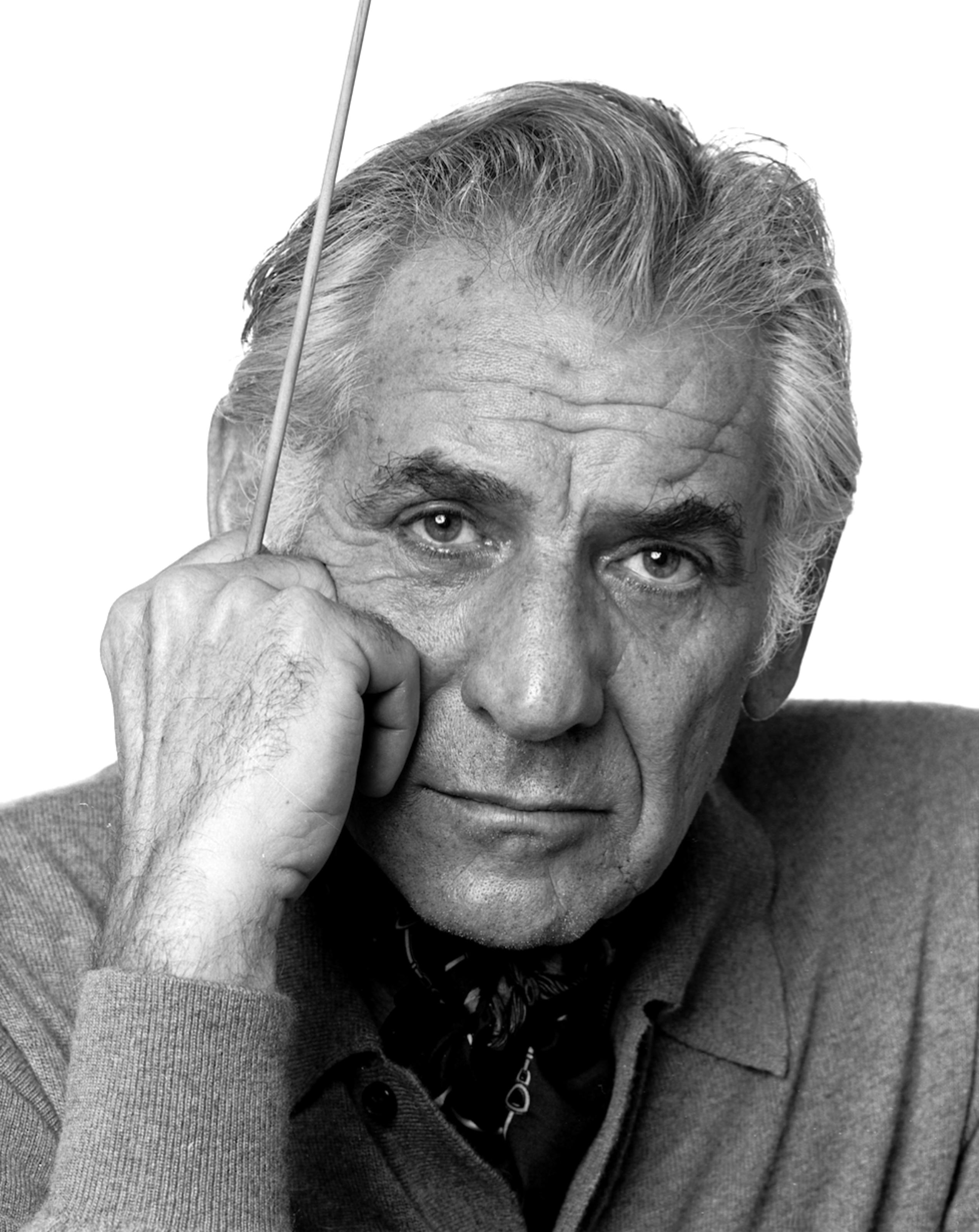
- Bernstein in 1977
- Composed: 1980 — Fairfield, Connecticut
- Dedication: Boston Symphony Orchestra, in celebration of its centenary
- Publisher: Leonard Bernstein Music Publishing Company; Boosey & Hawkes
- Duration: 14 minutes
- Movements: 8

Premiere
- Date: September 25, 1980
- Location: Boston Symphony Hall
- Conductor: Seiji Ozawa
- Performers: Boston Symphony Orchestra

Divertimento, or Divertimento for Orchestra, is a suite of eight orchestral bagatelles by American composer Leonard Bernstein. Completed in 1980 and written to celebrate the centenary of the Boston Symphony Orchestra, it is well-known for featuring the notes B and C in most of its melodic material.

== Background ==
Divertimento was composed two years after the death in 1978 of Bernstein's wife, Felicia Montealegre from lung cancer. They were married for 28 years, and Bernstein took care of her during her final years. In December 1979, he decided to take a sabbatical from commitments and projects, among which was the preparation of an opera based on Nabokov's Lolita, to devote his time exclusively to composing. In this period, which started in December 1979, he worked on many projects, including an untitled film to be directed by Francis Ford Coppola that was eventually abandoned and another musical with the working title Alarums and Flourishes which Bernstein ended on because it grew to be "more and more Broadway-ish".

Finally, in April 1980, Bernstein received a commission by the Boston Symphony Orchestra (BSO) to celebrate their centennial in their upcoming 1980–81 season. Bernstein had significant ties to the BSO, as he had grown up in Boston, graduated from Harvard University, and had spent some time in the 1940s at the Tanglewood Music Center, which had marked his directorial debut. His lifelong relationship with the orchestra was fruitful, as he conducted at least 133 BSO concerts.

Divertimento was initially devised as a short one-movement composition, but later become a longer suite with the original short piece as the first movement. The work was completed in Fairfield, Connecticut, in August 1980, but not yet orchestrated until a few days before the first performance. Bernstein dedicated the piece "with affection to the Boston Symphony Orchestra in celebration of its centenary."

The piece premiered on September 25, 1980, at the Symphony Hall in Boston, with the BSO conducted by Seiji Ozawa. At the premiere, in conversations with the Boston Globe, Bernstein described his own composition as "a fun piece" and a composition that "reflects my youthful experiences here where I heard my first orchestral music".

The composer revised the last movement of the piece in September 1983 to change the ending of the whole composition, with further revisions in 1987 and 1988. The piece was published shortly after its completion by the Leonard Bernstein Music Publishing Company and Boosey & Hawkes.

== Structure ==
Divertimento consists of eight very short pieces. Each of the bagatelles in the set has a distinct flavor and employs characteristics from different musical genres. The movement list is as follows:

1. "Sennets and Tuckets". Allegro non troppo, ma con brio
2. "Waltz". Allegretto, con grazia
3. "Mazurka". Mesto (Molto moderato)
4. "Samba". Allegro giusto
5. "Turkey Trot". Allegretto, ben misurato
6. "Sphinxes". Adagio lugubre
7. "Blues". Slow blues tempo
8. "In Memoriam; March: 'The BSO Forever'". Andante — Doppio movimento. Alla marcia — Tutti quanti tutta forza

The whole series of pieces is based around two notes: B, for "Boston", and C, for "Centennial". Every movement uses these two notes as the basis of all thematic ideas. The first movement, for example, uses the B-C interval prominently.

=== I. Sennets and Tuckets ===
The first movement was initially planned to be the Divertimento itself, a short piece with no further ambitions. The hendiadic title refers to two terms William Shakespeare used to describe fanfares in stage direction: a sennet announces the entrance of a king on stage, while a tucket is used as musical flourishing. It is in C major and, marked "Allegro non troppo, ma con brio" at the beginning. The B-C relationship is much more conspicuous than in other movements, especially in the last few chords, which feature a strongly dissonant B-C clash. Igor Stravinsky's Dumbarton Oaks concerto is quoted in the movement. The piece features many of the composition styles Bernstein explored in his professional career.

=== II. Waltz ===
The second movement is a string-only movement where the typical waltz time is replaced with a 7/8 (3/8+2/8+2/8). This is because Bernstein attempted to evoke the waltz from Tchaikovsky's Pathétique Symphony, which is in 5/4, and which was a favorite of Sergei Koussevitzky, a long-time friend and collaborator of Bernstein's, and conductor of the BSO. The movement would later become a song dedicated to Bernstein's daughter Jamie for her 28th birthday.

=== III. Mazurka ===
The third movement is scored for woodwinds and harp. A slow-moving piece in 3/4 (the time signature only changes for one bar to 5/4), it is marked Mesto (sad) in the score and is in C minor. At the end, the oboe performs a short cadenza where Bernstein quotes the oboe cadenza used by Beethoven in his Fifth Symphony.

=== IV. Samba ===
The fourth movement is colorful, using Latin rhythms and orchestration. Somewhat reminiscent of the music he wrote in other Latino-related works such as West Side Story, the time signature is, but frequently changing. It is a fast and lively piece with a few tempo shifts, scored for the whole orchestra.

=== V. Turkey Trot ===
The fifth movement has an uncommon time signature: +3/4. It is a dance that is meant to sound odd, almost limping. The composer uses subito dynamic extreme changes and some advanced techniques, such as col legno for the strings. The piece was taken from the discarded Coppola movie project.

=== VI. Sphinxes ===
The sixth movement is the shortest and slowest one. Spanning only 11 bars (with one bar in the middle that acts as a grand pause), the piece features a twelve-tone row. This movement also shares its title with a small movement in Schumann's Carnaval — a piece so simple Schumann was uncertain it was going to be played. The movement ends with an attacca, jumping directly into the next movement.

=== VII. Blues ===
The seventh movement is a slow blues featuring brass and percussion instruments. This movement includes a solo fragment by the baritone euphonium and a short cadenza at the end by the first trumpet. Time signatures are variable, but they generally shift from 12/8 to 9/8. Bernstein specifically requests the drum kit to largely ad lib his part with the brass while encouraging "spontaneous invention". The movement is a reference to Bernstein's boyhood visits to Boston nightclubs, and bears some resemblance to Bernstein's own Prelude, Fugue and Riffs.

=== VIII. In Memoriam; March: "The BSO Forever" ===
The final movement is a movement in two parts. The first part, In Memoriam is a slow "Andante" section with a solemn canon scored for three flutes. According to Jack Gottlieb, this section is meant to serve as remembrance to "the conductors and members of the Boston Symphony Orchestra no longer with us". After a long trill, the segment segues into the march.

The march, a lively and fast dance, is loosely based on the Radetzky March, which was a regular feature of Arthur Fiedler's Boston Pops concerts. The march is followed by a Trio I which features a different theme. This is, in turn, followed by a Trio II, only to come back to the main march. After a long pause, the Trio II theme and the ending are reprised. Near the end, Bernstein's score asks the two main flutists and, later, the entire brass section to stand up, which was typical of traditional Sousa marches, especially The Stars and Stripes Forever, which is where the title comes from.

== Instrumentation ==
In Divertimento, the instrumentation for each movement is different, as many parts are tacet in some movements. The suite is scored for two flutes, two piccolos (piccolo 2 doubling flute 3), two oboes, a cor anglais, a clarinet in E♭, two clarinets in B♭ and in A, a bass clarinet, two bassoons, a contrabassoon, four French horns in F, three trumpets in C, three trombones, a tuba (doubling a baritone euphonium), a large percussion section (consisting of timpani, four differently-sized snare drums, a bass drum, a pair of cymbals, a pair of large cymbals, a suspended cymbal, a gong, a triangle, a tambourine, a woodblock, two differently-sized Cuban cowbells, sandpaper blocks, a güiro, a pair of maracas, three bongos, two congas, four temple blocks, a drum kit, a glockenspiel, a xylophone, a vibraphone, and chimes), a piano, a harp, and a standard string section.

== Arrangement ==
Divertimento was transcribed for wind band by Clare Grundman in 1984.

== Recordings ==
The following is a list of recordings of Divertimento:

- The Israel Philharmonic Orchestra recorded a live performance of the piece with Bernstein in the conductor's seat. The recording was taken in May 1981 in Tel Aviv and was released that same year on LP and cassette by Deutsche Grammophon, and re-released on CD Audio in 1988 and 2002.
- The Symphonie-Orchester Des Bayerischen Rundfunks recorded the piece with Bernstein as the conductor. The recording, taken on November 15 and 16, 1983, at the Erkel Theater in Budapest, was released by Hungaroton both on LP and CD Audio and by Music Express Classics on CD Audio in 1983.
- The Boston Pops recorded the piece with John Williams conducting in June 1985. This recording is included on the Bernstein by Boston album released by Philips Records in 1986.
- The City of Birmingham Symphony Orchestra recorded the piece with conductor Paavo Järvi. The recording was made at the Bournemouth's Symphony Hall on June 8 to 10, 1997. It was released by Virgin Classics in 2006 on CD Audio and later by EMI Classics in a compilation of Bernstein works on CD Audio in 2012 and by Warner Classics in 2018.
- The Minnesota Orchestra recorded the piece with conductor Eiji Oue at the Orchestra Hall in Minneapolis, on February 17 and 18, 1999. The recording was released that year by Reference Recordings on CD Audio and HDCD.
- The Bournemouth Symphony Orchestra recorded the piece with conductor Marin Alsop on January 12 and 13, 2005, at the Concert Hall in Lighthouse, in Poole. The recording was released by Naxos in 2005 on CD Audio.

=== Transcription for wind band ===
- The Danish Concert Band recorded a wind band arrangement with conductor Jørgen Misser Jensen in 1994. The recording, taken at Brøndby Strand Kirke, was released by Rondo Grammofon in 1995 on CD Audio.
