= Leonard Falcone International Tuba and Euphonium Festival =

Annual event

The Leonard Falcone International Euphonium and Tuba Festival ("Falcone Festival" or simply "Falcone" for short) is an amateur tuba and euphonium festival and competition, held annually the second week in August at the Blue Lake Fine Arts Camp at Twin Lake, Michigan.

== Origin and goals of the festival ==
Leonard Falcone (b. 1899 Roseto Valfortore, Italy, d. 1985 East Lansing Michigan) was a longtime director of bands and professor at Michigan State University who taught, performed and recorded as a master of the baritone horn and a pioneer of euphonium artistry. The festival was founded by former Falcone students in 1986, to honor his memory. Among its stated goals are to enhance the repertoire of the euphonium and tuba through the commissioning of new works, to promote outstanding artistry on these instruments, and to encourage young people to study them.

Over the years, the Festival has become highly competitive and visible; it is among the most prestigious amateur competitions for both the tuba and euphonium.

Presently, there are four divisions: Student Tuba and Student Euphonium, for players age 20 and younger, and Artist Tuba and Artist Euphonium, for amateur players of any age^{†}, though in reality this translates to college students, mostly at the graduate level.

== Developments in the festival ==
The Falcone Festival has undergone several changes since its inception. Some prominent developments include:

- In 1991, the Festival began inviting prominent guest artists to give masterclasses, lessons, and solo recitals, and over the years, numerous new works have been commissioned and premiered at the festival by these artists. It could be said that at this time it truly became a festival, rather than merely a competition. The first such euphonium artist was Brian Bowman.
- In 1996, the Festival added Student and Artist divisions for the tuba in addition to the euphonium.
- In 2003, the number of players admitted to each Student division was lowered from ten to six.
- As of 2007, the requirement that participants in the Student divisions still be in high school has been dropped; the only requirement is that they not have turned 20 by the December 1 following the Festival.

== Prestige of the Festival and famous alumni ==
Many past winners of the Festival's various divisions have gone on to win major performing or teaching jobs. Some well-known Festival alumni include:

Euphoniumists

- Angie Hunter, 1986 Artist winner, now instructor at the German Bible Institute in Koenigsfeld, Germany
- Lance LaDuke, 1986 Student winner, now instructor at Duquesne University and former principal player with the River City Brass Band
- Matthew Tropman, 1990 Student and 1993 Artist winner, former member of the U.S. Marine Band, now instructor at the University of Arizona
- David Thornton, 1994 Student winner, now principal player with the Black Dyke Band
- Adam Frey, 1997 Artist winner, now instructor at Emory University and Georgia State University and a freelance soloist
- Dr. Benjamin Pierce, 1998 Artist winner, now professor at the University of Arkansas
- Mark Jenkins, 1996 Student and 2000 Artist winner, currently euphoniumist with the "President's Own" Marine Band in Washington, D.C.
- Matthew Murchison, 1997 Student and 2001 Artist winner, now acting principal euphonium of the River City Brass Band and a freelance soloist
- Ryan McGeorge, 2003 Artist winner, currently euphoniumist with the "President's Own" Marine Band in Washington, D.C.

Tubists

- Joseph Skillen, 1997 Artist winner, now professor at Louisiana State University
- Dr. Charles Guy, 1999 Artist winner, now professor at the State University of New York at Potsdam
- Carolyn Jantsch, 2000 Student and 2004 Artist winner, principal tuba of the Philadelphia Orchestra
- Dr. Benjamin Pierce, 2001 Artist winner, now professor at the University of Arkansas
