= Blue Lake Fine Arts Camp =

Nonprofit organization in Twin Lake, Michigan

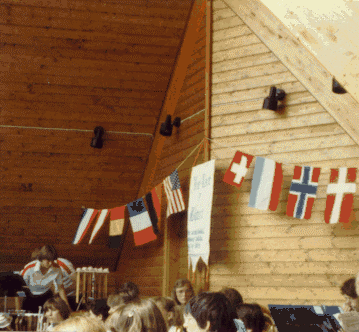
- International Blue Lake group on stage in Germany
- Motto: Anthem of Blue Lake - "From Canterbury Lane"
- Type: Classical and contemporary music school
- Established: 1966
- Founders: Fritz & Gretchen Stansell
- Location: Twin Lake, MI, United States of America
- Campus: Rural, 1,600 acres (650 ha)
- Website: www.bluelake.org

Blue Lake Fine Arts Camp is a Michigan nonprofit organization located in the Manistee National Forest that provides summer fine arts camp and international exchange programs in music, art, dance, and drama.

The Blue Lake Fine Arts Camp was founded as a non-profit organization in 1966 by the Stansell family, who remain the multi-generational proprietors of the institution. The camp is located on approximately 1200 acres in the Manistee National Forest in Michigan. It can host 4500 5th through 12th grade students across several 12-day sessions each summer. It operates FM radio stations locally and in Grand Rapids that are National Public Radio affiliates.

The Blue Lake campus is split into Central Camp and Bernstein Camp. While Central hosts high-school age students during sessions 1 and 2, Bernstein hosts middle-school age students, and while Central hosts middle-school age students during sessions 3 and 4, Bernstein hosts rising 5th through 7th graders. For Central campers, numerous majors or study areas are offered, including theater, band, orchestra, choir, art, dance, among others. Bernstein campers may choose between a Band major or an Orchestra major. Both Central and Berenstein campers can choose from numerous minor or secondary areas of study.

Blue Lake also offers adult camp and family camp programs. Like the youth programs, adult campers take part in daily instruction on their instrument as well as ensemble rehearsals. Access to the camp's recreational, elective instructional, and regular concert programs is available to all ages as well. Adult musicians may either stay on Blue Lake property in campers or tents in the Niblock campground, or find accommodation at local hotels.

== International exchange ==
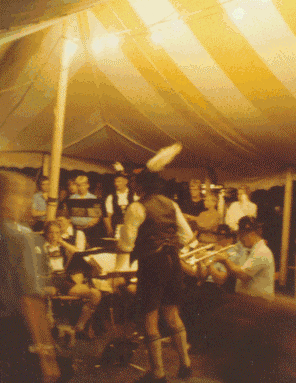
Blue Lake Students and Staff join with a town band in the Bavarian Alpine foothills.

Blue Lake hosts international exchange students in the arts as well as organizing several ensembles of American students to travel to Europe and perform each year. These ensembles include, but are not limited to, concert band, jazz band, orchestra, and choir. These exchanges serve to expose students to other cultures and have been cited as “outstanding representatives of the United States”. The camp has also initiated such experiments in multi-cultural cooperation as the Blue Lake in Bavaria concert band which was formed out of a mixture of American and European junior and senior high school students to rehearse and perform together over the course of a month.

== Leonard Falcone ==
Prior to the founding of Blue Lake, Leonard Falcone, baritone virtuoso and Director of Bands at Michigan State University, had conducted many Youth Music at Michigan State summer camps in conjunction with, and support of, the Michigan School Band and Orchestra Association. At the urging of Fritz Stansell, Falcone shifted his focus to aiding the program at Blue Lake and became a regular staff member/artist in residence. Falcone would be joined later by other notables of the music education and concert band world, such as composers John Barnes Chance and Václav Nelhýbel.

Following Falcone's death in 1985, Blue Lake became home to the new Leonard Falcone International Tuba and Euphonium Festival and competition created by his students in his memory and held at Blue Lake every year. This has become a significant annual event in the international tuba and euphonium community and is the leading American venue for these instruments.

== See also ==
Leonard Falcone International Tuba and Euphonium Festival

Solid Brass: The Leonard Falcone Story by Rita Griffin Comstock
