= Brian Bowman =

American euphoniumist and professor (born 1946)

- Born: Brian Leslie Bowman; July 22, 1946 (age 79); Fort Dodge, Iowa, U.S.
- Genres: Concert band
- Occupations: Performer and teacher and soloist
- Instrument: Euphonium
- Years active: 1970–present
- Website: Dr. Brian Bowman 2020 archive Univ. of N. Texas

Brian Leslie Bowman (born July 22, 1946) is an American virtuoso euphonium artist and music professor who, among other things, held the principal euphonium chair and was a featured soloist with the premier concert bands of the United States Navy and Air Force. On March 28, 1976, Bowman performed the first euphonium recital at Carnegie Hall.

== Early life and education ==
Bowman was born in Fort Dodge, Iowa. He earned a bachelor of music degree (June 1970) and master of music degree (August 1970) from the University of Michigan School of Music, Theatre & Dance in Ann Arbor. He earned a doctor of musical arts from the Catholic University of America School of Music (1975).

== Career ==
Bowman served as a member of three United States military bands, two of which were premier ensembles for their respective services. Bowman served as solo euphonium in the United States Navy Band from 1970 to 1974. This was followed by a two-year period serving with a joint ensemble, the United States Armed Forces Bicentennial Band. He completed his career with the United States Air Force Band, serving from 1976 to 1991.

Bowman was first to perform a recital on euphonium at Carnegie Hall in New York. He also was the first guest euphonium artist at the Leonard Falcone International Tuba and Euphonium Festival at Blue Lake Fine Arts Camp in Twin Lake, Michigan.

Bowman has recorded dozens of ensemble performances in addition to six solo albums on euphonium. He has recorded many new works for euphonium, many of which were written specifically for the instrument. One of the albums, reviewed in The New Records in 1979 was described as containing all music that seemed to "exist just to have something for the euphonium to play". While going on to describe Bowman as "a master of his instrument", the review of the compositions was not favorable.

== Professional career ==
Bowman broke new ground in the American understanding of the euphonium and has been called "The most famous euphonium soloist in the world today". He became known for a "warm, velvet tone" and promoted a style of playing described as "traditional vibrato... balanced by... clean and impressive technique, from-the-heart expressiveness, and a sense of calm assurance". He advanced this new image of the instrument through his performances of new literature, premiering 4 of the 7 such works commissioned by the former Tubists Universal Brotherhood Association (TUBA) now known as the International Tuba Euphonium Association. He served as its president, and was the first euphonium player to do so.

Bowman has been involved in the evolution of the instrument. He has served as a consultant for the design of euphonium mouthpieces to the Swiss-based Willson Musical Instrument Company, whose products are distributed in North America by Eastman Music Company. He has been instrumental in DEG Music Products, which released a line of mouthpieces bearing Bowman's name.

Bowman has been on the music faculty at the University of North Texas College of Music for twenty-six years (since August 1999), where he is a Regents Professor. He was head of the Brass Department at Duquesne University (1992–1999). Bowman has served on the faculty of seven other universities. He continues to perform as a member of several ensembles and serves as a guest instructor and clinician frequently.

== Selected discography ==
- Brian Bowman, Euphonium: The First Carnegie Hall Euphonium Recital, Crystal Records (CD) (2009); OCLC 311798465; UPC 009414739322

Performed live, 8:30 PM, March 28, 1976, Carnegie Recital Hall, New York
Gordon Stout, marimba; Marjorie Lee (DMA 1977) (née Marjorie Huffman; born 1946), piano
1st, 3rd, 4th, & 5th works originally released in 1978 as under the title Brian Bowman, Euphonium, Crystal S393 (LP) & C393 (cassette); OCLC 4827616

1) "Andante and Rondo", for euphonium & piano, Antonio Capuzzi, adapted for euphonium & piano by Philip Bramwell Catelinet (1910–1995)
2) "Sonata", for euphonium & piano, Arthur Frackenpohl; recorded 2008
3) "Partita", for euphonium & piano, Walter Beghtol Ross (born 1936)
4) "Four Dialogs", for euphonium & marimba, Samuel Adler
5) "Sonatina", for euphonium & synthesizer, John Boda
6) "Fantasia Originale", for euphonium & piano", Ermano Picchi (1811–1856); arr. by Simone Mantia; recorded 2008

- The Sacred Euphonium, Mark Records (1988); OCLC 25425356

James Welch, organ

== Family ==
Bowman's father, Bardell Robinson Bowman (born 1915), was a music teacher in the public schools in Dixon, Illinois. Brian Bowman learned to play with the guidance of his father attending a grade school in Dixon where his father taught band. Bowman married Vinette Parry (born 1945) in Salt Lake City on August 26, 1970. They have a son, Brian Parry Bowman (born 1973), who is a recording engineer. Bowman has two siblings, Victor B. Bowman (born 1945) who is a trumpeter and music educator, and Linda Jane Smith, who is a vocalist, pianist, choir director, and music educator.

== See also ==
- List of euphonium players
