= Baritone horn =

Low-pitched brass instrument

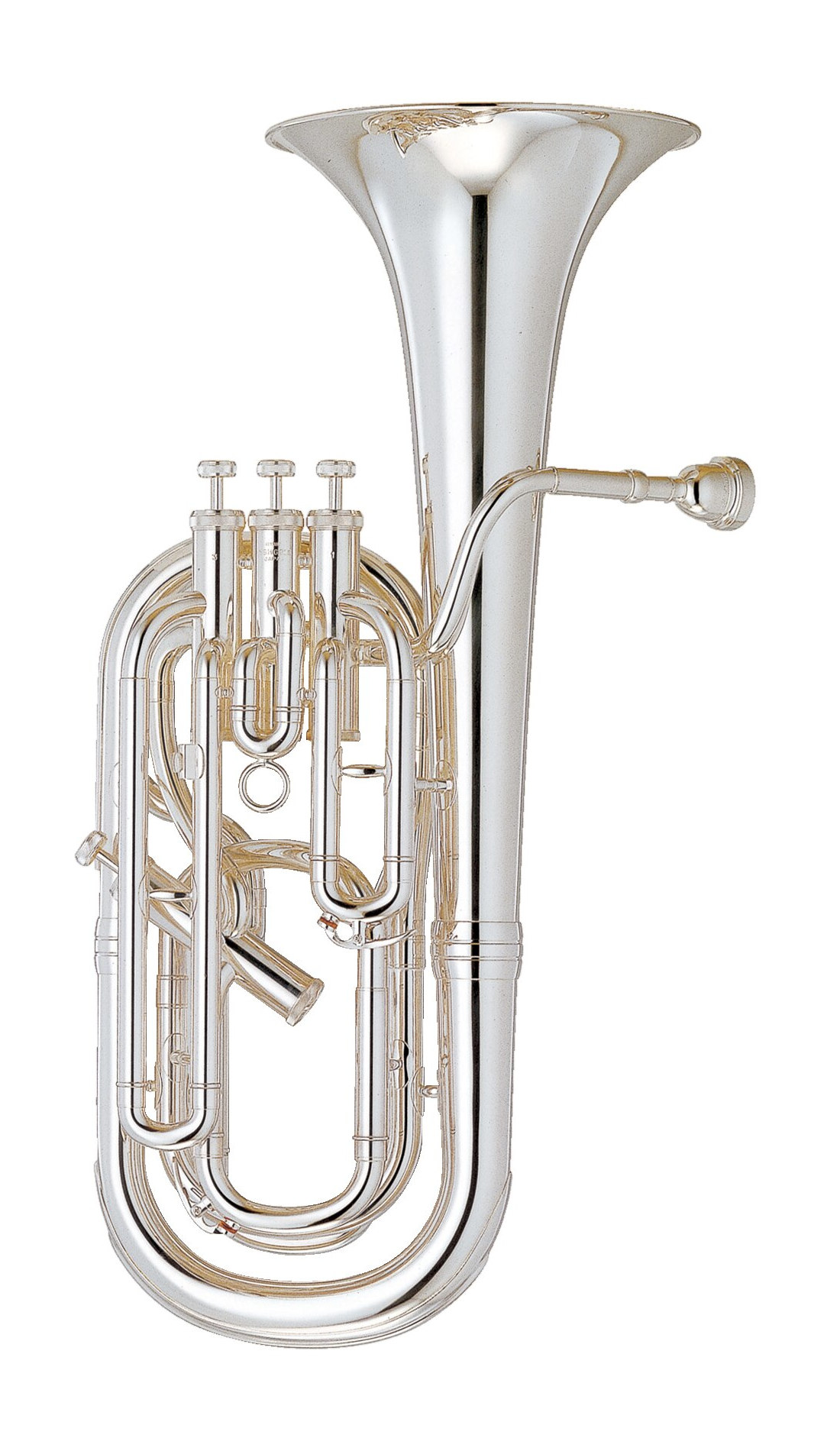

Brass instrument
- Other names: German: Tenorhorn; Italian: flicorno tenore, tenore; French: saxhorn baryton
- Classification: Aerophone; Wind; Brass; Saxhorn
- Hornbostel–Sachs classification: 423.232 (Valved bugle with moderately conical bore)

Playing range
- The baritone is notated in bass clef at concert pitch or as a transposing instrument in treble clef sounding a major ninth lower (see § Range)

Related instruments
- Euphonium; Saxhorn; Tenor horn; Wagner tuba

Musicians
- Mike Cavanagh; Helen Harrelson; Katrina Marzella; Robert Richardson

Builders
- List of euphonium, baritone horn and tenor horn manufacturers

The baritone horn, or often simply the baritone, is a valved brass instrument pitched in B♭ in the saxhorn family, employed chiefly in brass, military and concert bands. In North America, for most of the 20th century, the term baritone also referred to similar instruments with a wider bore closer to the euphonium. The baritone has three or sometimes four piston valves, although rotary valves are common in Eastern and Central Europe, where it is called the Tenorhorn. The bore is moderately conical, like the E♭ tenor horn and cornet, although narrower than the euphonium and other valved bugles, like the flugelhorn and tuba. It uses a wide-rimmed cup mouthpiece of similar dimensions to trombone and euphonium mouthpieces. Like the trombone and the euphonium, the baritone can be considered either a transposing instrument reading B♭ treble clef or a non-transposing instrument in bass clef.

In British brass bands, the standard instrumentation includes parts for two baritones in addition to two euphoniums. In US concert band music, there is often a part marked baritone, but these parts are commonly intended for, and played on, the euphonium. A baritone can also play music written for a trombone due to similarities in timbre and range.

== Name ==
The name baritone has been applied to several related valved brass instruments in different places, languages, and times in history, generally pitched in 8-foot (8′) C or 9′ B♭ and developed in the 19th century. Although similar, the euphonium has a wider conical bore and larger bell that places it closer to the tuba.

Names in other languages include the French saxhorn baryton, from which the modern British brass band instrument was derived, and in Italian, flicorno tenore; flicorno baritono and flicorno basso refer to the euphonium, the basso always having a fourth valve. In Germany, the baritone usually has an oval shape and rotary valves and is called the Tenorhorn (while the smaller E♭ tenor horn is called the Althorn), and Baryton or Baritonhorn refer to a similar instrument but with the euphonium's larger bore and bell size. The American tendency to confuse the baritone and euphonium may have been due to the influx of German musicians and instrument makers to the United States in the 19th century.

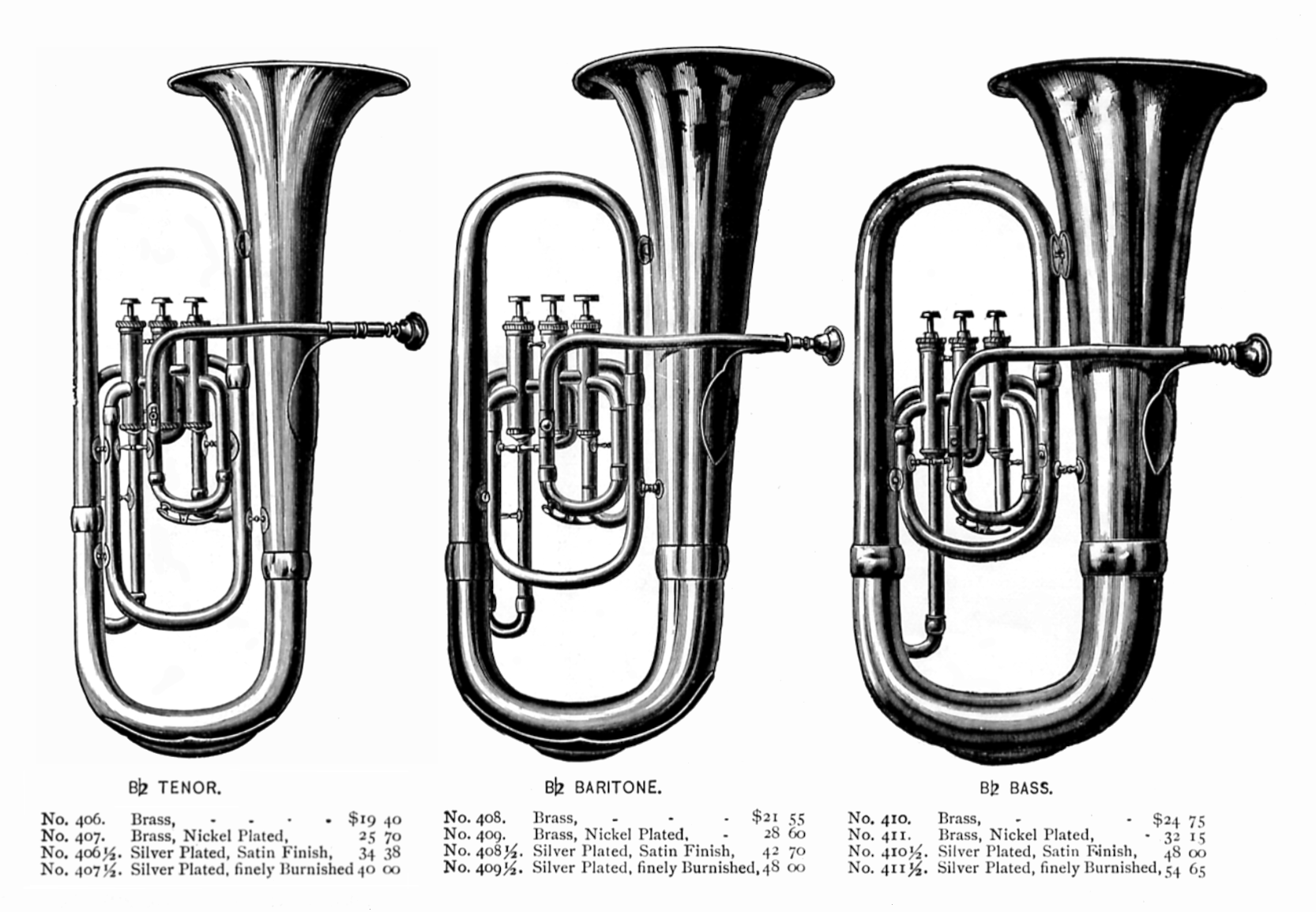
Baritone and euphonium instruments in the 1894 Lyon & Healy catalog

The 1894 catalog from Lyon & Healy, a Chicago-based instrument maker and retailer, depicts instruments called the B♭ tenor, B♭ baritone, and B♭ bass (with only one "B"), with the same pitch and overall three-valve construction and differing only in bore and bell widths.

=== American baritone ===
The American-style baritone with three piston valves on the front and a curved forward-pointing bell was dominant in American school marching bands throughout most of the 20th century. This instrument, along with the British-style upright baritone, concert euphonium, and similar-looking cylindrical bore instruments like the trombonium, were almost universally lumped together and labelled as baritones by both band directors and composers.

== History ==
The baritone horn found in British brass bands was derived from the French saxhorn baryton, a lower-pitched member of the family of saxhorns, although bore measurements of historical instruments show that it is closer to the baritone saxotromba. These were two families of conical-bore piston valve instruments developed in the 1840s by Adolphe Sax. Other members developed into instruments now common in bands, such as the E♭ tenor horn and the E♭ and B♭ tubas.

By the 1850s, Sax had convinced French military bands to use exclusively saxhorns in their bands, giving the instruments one of its first staples in the military field. Adolphe Sax's saxhorns became standard in bands in Britain and the United States largely due to the Distin family, who helped popularise the British brass band movement, promoting and performing widely on Sax's brass instruments. By 1850, Distin & Co. was manufacturing them in London, and in New York and Pennsylvania by the 1870s, after the London business was purchased by Boosey & Co.

In central and eastern Europe, the Baß-Tuba, patented in 1835 by the Prussian military conductor Wilhelm Friedrich Wieprecht and Berlin maker Johann Gottfried Moritz, inspired several related instruments. These eventually utilized rotary valves, and their characteristic oval shape was developed by Václav František Červený in the late 19th century. The equivalent of these to the baritone in bore, bell size, and sound is called the Tenorhorn in German.

=== Developments in North America ===
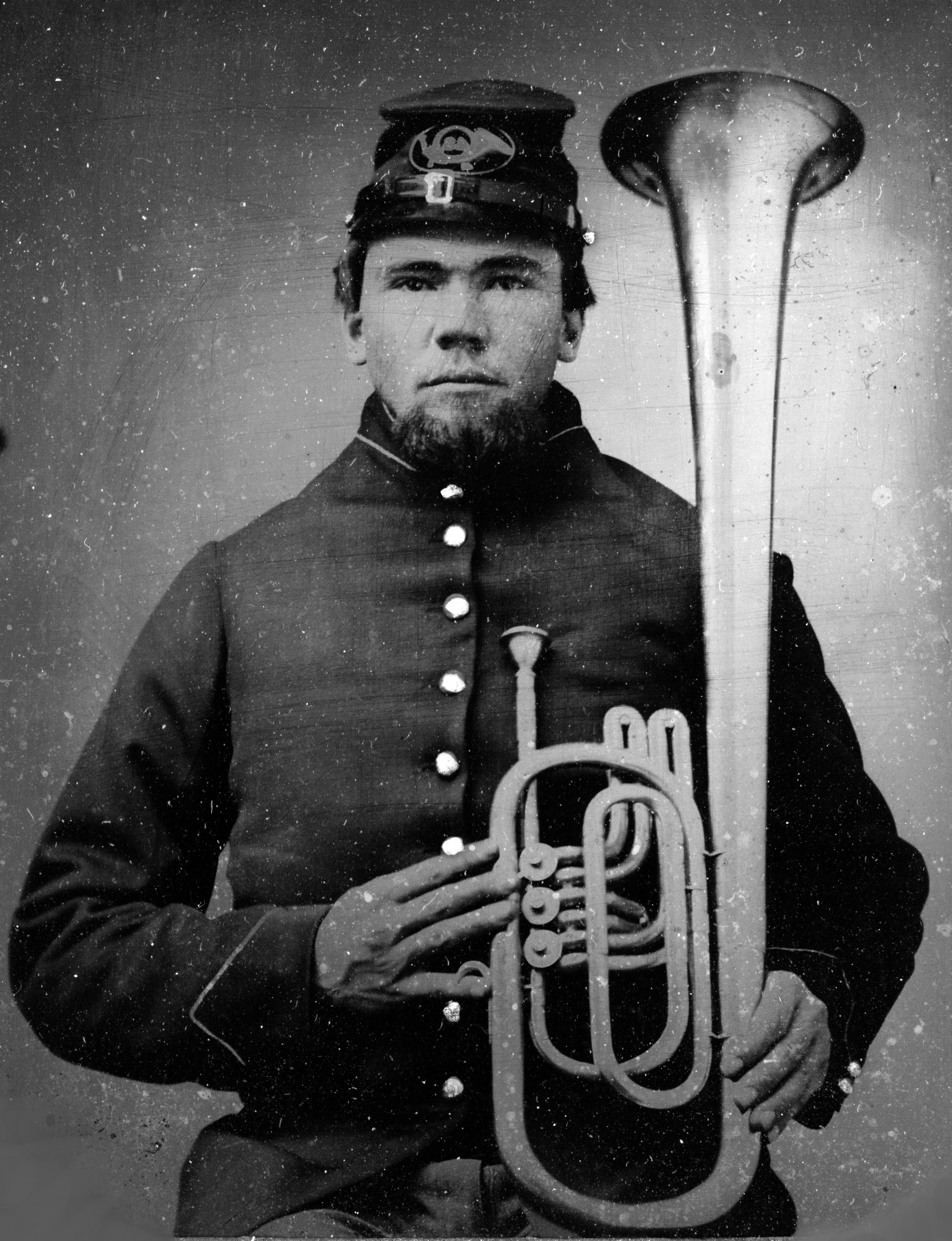
Union soldier with an over-the-shoulder baritone, early 1860s

In the US at the start of the American Civil War, there were only a small number of military bands: the United States Marine Band, the United States Military Academy Band, several Regular Army regimental bands, and bands associated with state militias. In July 1861, the Department of War ordered a full band of at least 16 musicians be assigned to each regiment, and two field musicians per company, playing bugle, fife, or drum. These groups adopted bugles and saxhorns, including B♭ baritones and euphoniums. Over-the-shoulder varieties were frequently employed, as the backward-pointing bell of the instrument allowed troops marching behind the band to more easily hear the music.

During the course of the American Civil War from 1861 to 1865, US instrument makers produced tens of thousands of brass instruments, and many have survived in museums. After the war, the bands and their music remained popular, and manufacturing demand for bugles and saxhorns remained strong. From these ensembles and musicians emerged the American drum and bugle corps tradition, which standardised on brass instruments pitched in G by the early 1890s.

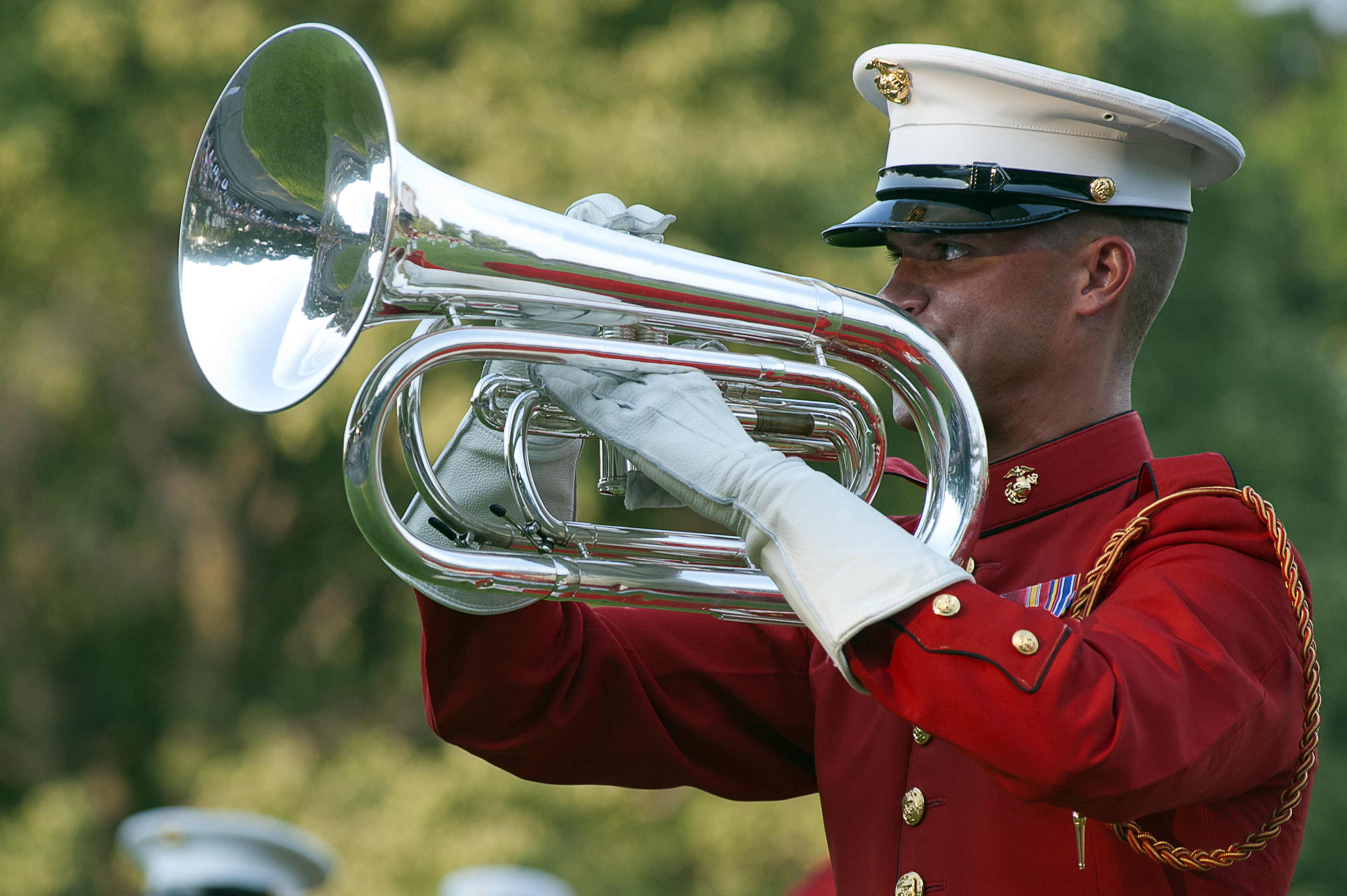
Sgt. David Cox, US Marine Drum & Bugle Corps playing baritone bugle in G with two piston valves

By the early 1930s, the narrow bore bass bugle in G used until then had evolved into the baritone bugle (originally known as a bass baritone), with a wider bore. Also in G, it had a single piston valve that lowered the pitch a fourth, into D. Ludwig (then a subsidiary of C. G. Conn) called theirs the "Baro-tone" bugle. In the following decade, an additional semitone rotary valve was added, then replaced with a second F piston valve as permitted by a rule change in 1967. By 2000, Drum Corps International (DCI), the governing body for competitive drum and bugle corps in North America, changed the rules to permit three-valved instruments in any key, not just G. This allowed instruments common in other band movements to be used in the ensemble, including both regular and bell-forward marching versions of B♭ baritones and euphoniums.

=== The modern instrument ===
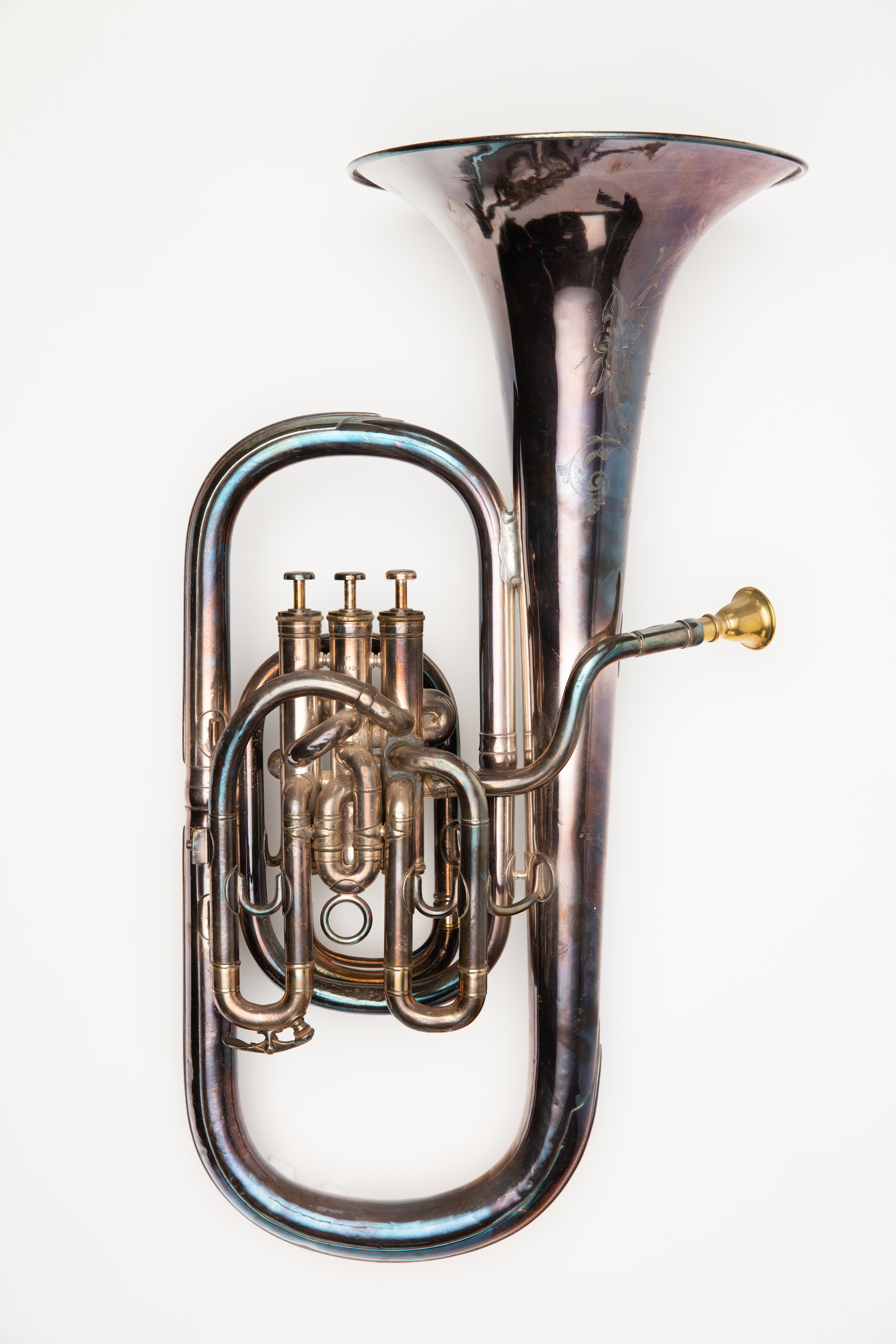
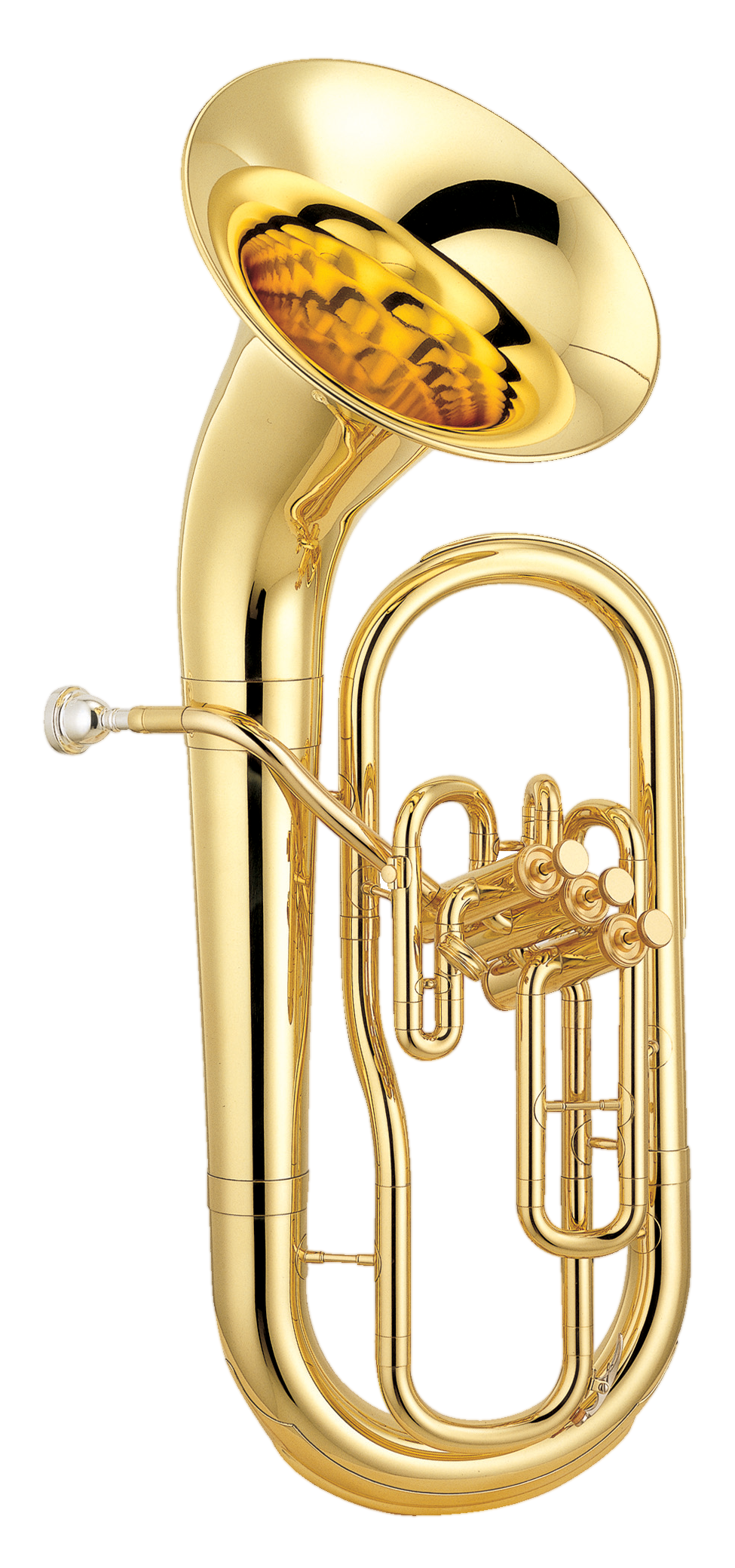
British baritone by Boosey & Hawkes with three compensating valves, left; American marching model by Yamaha with three front-action valves and forward-pointing bell, right (Auckland Museum; Yamaha Corporation)

The modern British baritone horn was developed from the French saxhorn baryton. In the 1870s, a three-valve compensation system was developed by David Blaikley, the factory manager at the London-based manufacturer Boosey & Co. He developed a compensating third valve, where its tubing returns the airway through the first two valves a second time, adding smaller tubing loops to rectify intonation. Similar designs were patented earlier: by Gustave Auguste Besson in 1859 and Pierre-Louis Gautrot's système equitonique in 1864. Blaikley's compensation system was the most successful and was used on instruments by Boosey & Co. (later, Boosey & Hawkes) and Besson, after their merger in the mid-20th century. The three-valve system is still used on baritones from Besson, as well as Blaikley's four-valve compensating system found more commonly on euphoniums.

For much of the 20th century in the United States, the baritone horn referred to a wider bore instrument closer to the euphonium, with three front-action piston valves and usually a curved, forward-pointing bell. Originally made by American makers Conn and King, and later by Yamaha and Jupiter, these were popular with school marching bands and military bands. They were often used interchangeably with the euphonium by American players, band directors, and composers. Manufacturers sometimes listed instruments with identical dimensions, labeling the cheaper student instruments baritones, and reserving the name euphonium for the more expensive professional models.

== Construction ==
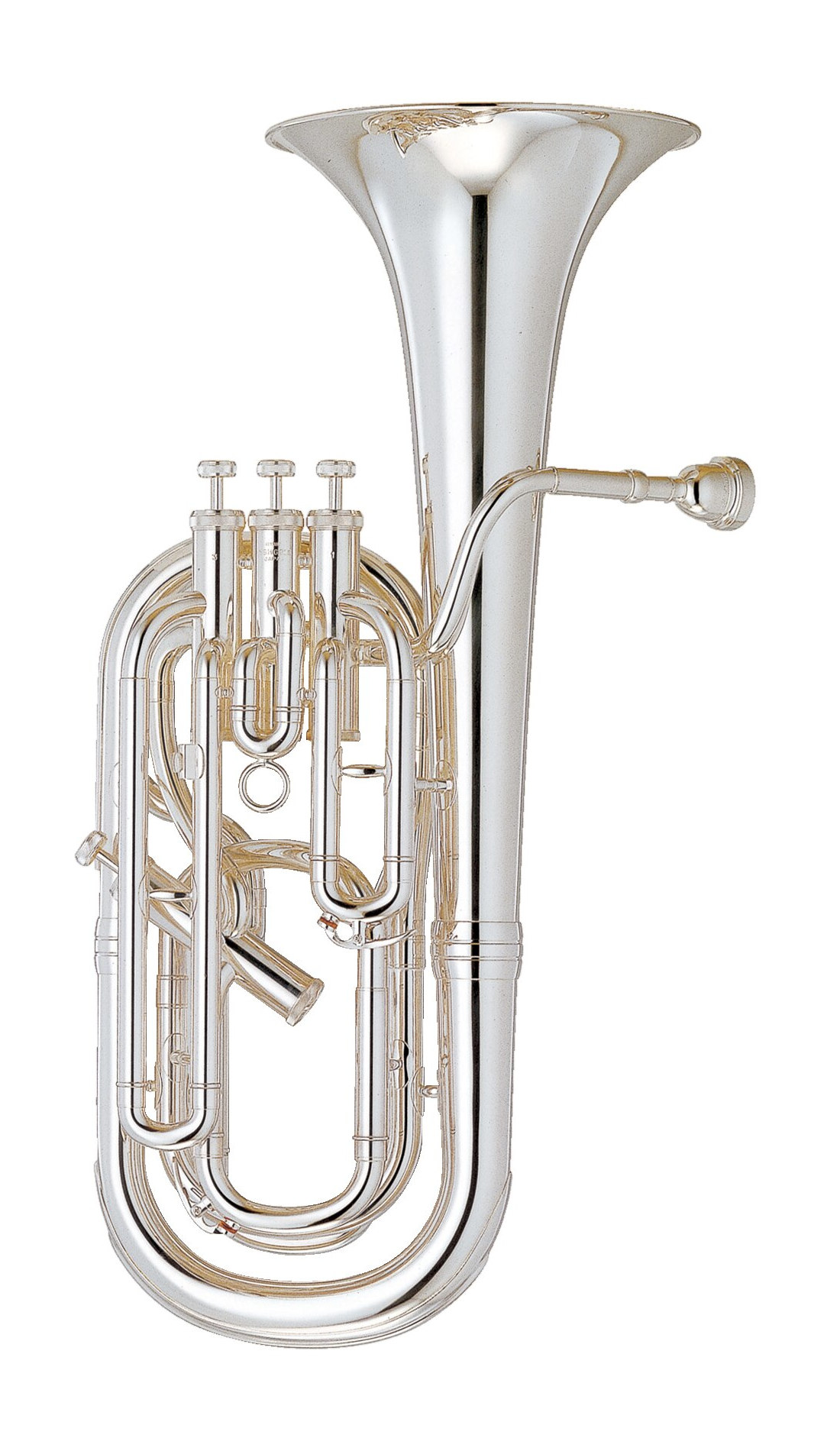
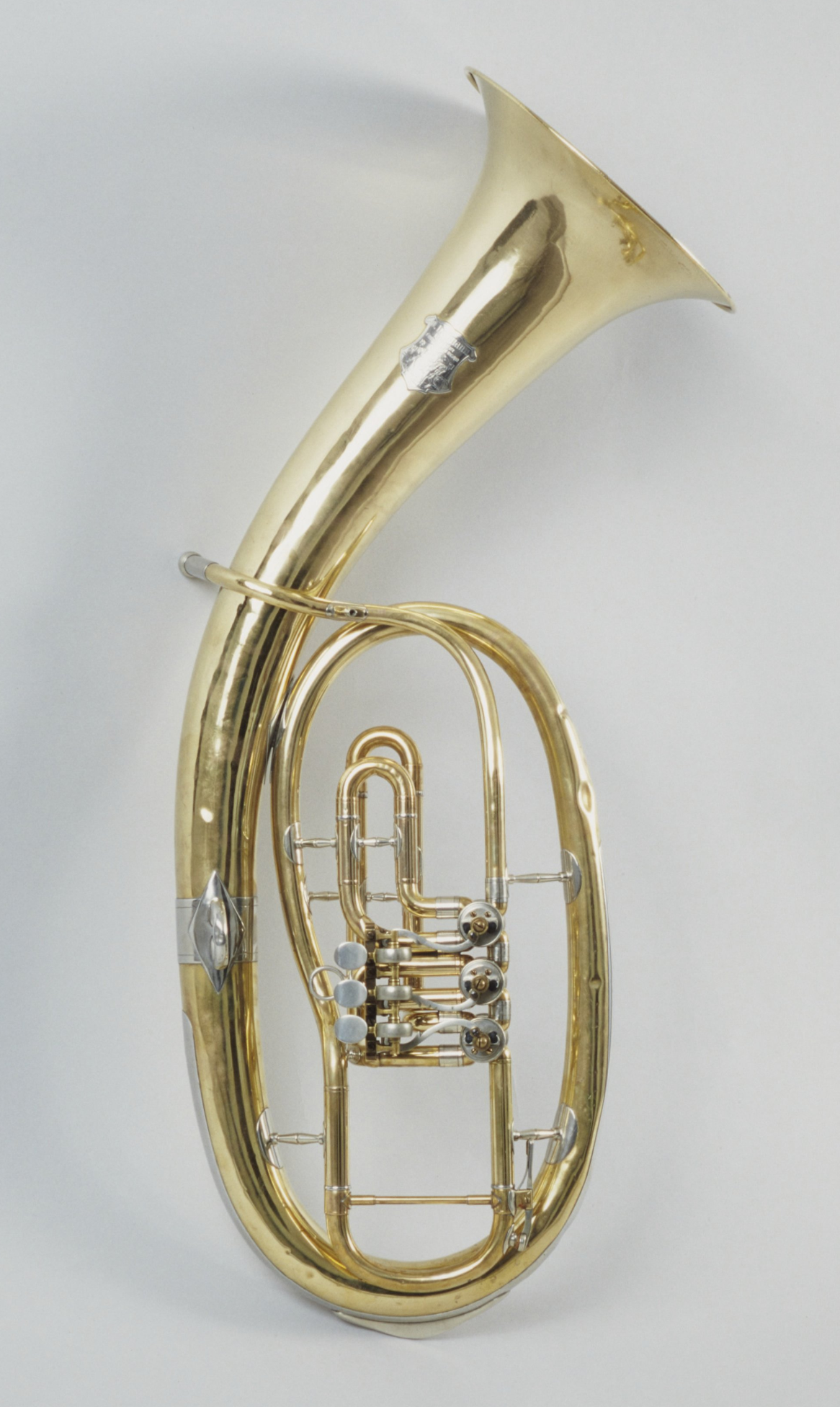
British baritone with four compensating valves by Yamaha, left; European baritone (German: Tenorhorn) by Hoffmann, right (Yamaha Corporation; St Cecilia's Hall, University of Edinburgh)

The baritone horn, like the euphonium, is pitched in 9-foot (9′) B♭, an octave below the trumpet or cornet. When no valves are in use, the instrument will produce partials of the B♭ harmonic series which result from the vibrating air column within its 9 feet (2.7 metres) of tubing.

Like the euphonium, the baritone has a predominantly conical bore, but it is narrower, with less expansion of the bell flare and a consequently smaller bell diameter. It has a tighter wrap and is thus smaller and lighter overall. These characteristics favour higher frequency overtones in the sound, rendering a brighter, more trombone-like timbre than the euphonium.

As with other valved brass instruments, the valves each add lengths of tubing to lower the pitch of the instrument and produce a fully chromatic scale and range. Baritones commonly have three top-action piston valves, operated with the first three fingers of the right hand. Some have a fourth valve, generally found midway down the right side of the instrument, and played with the index or middle finger of the left hand. Some may have a fourth top-action valve placed next to the other three, played with the fourth finger of the right hand. European Tenorhorns mostly have an oval shape and three or four non-compensating rotary valves, operated together by the right hand.

=== Compensating valves ===
Many British-style three-valve baritones and some older American instruments have a compensating third valve. These route the tubing of the third valve back through the first two, which add a second set of small correcting lengths of tubing to correct the intonation of the lower notes, e.g. C_{3} and B_{2}. On premium models, the fourth valve is a compensating valve, resolving intonation and providing range below E_{2}.

The fourth valve lowers the instrument a fourth, provides an alternate fingering for valves 1+3, and serves the same range-extending function as the F valve attachment on the tenor trombone. Although less common on baritones, its absence is not a defining characteristic.

== Performance ==
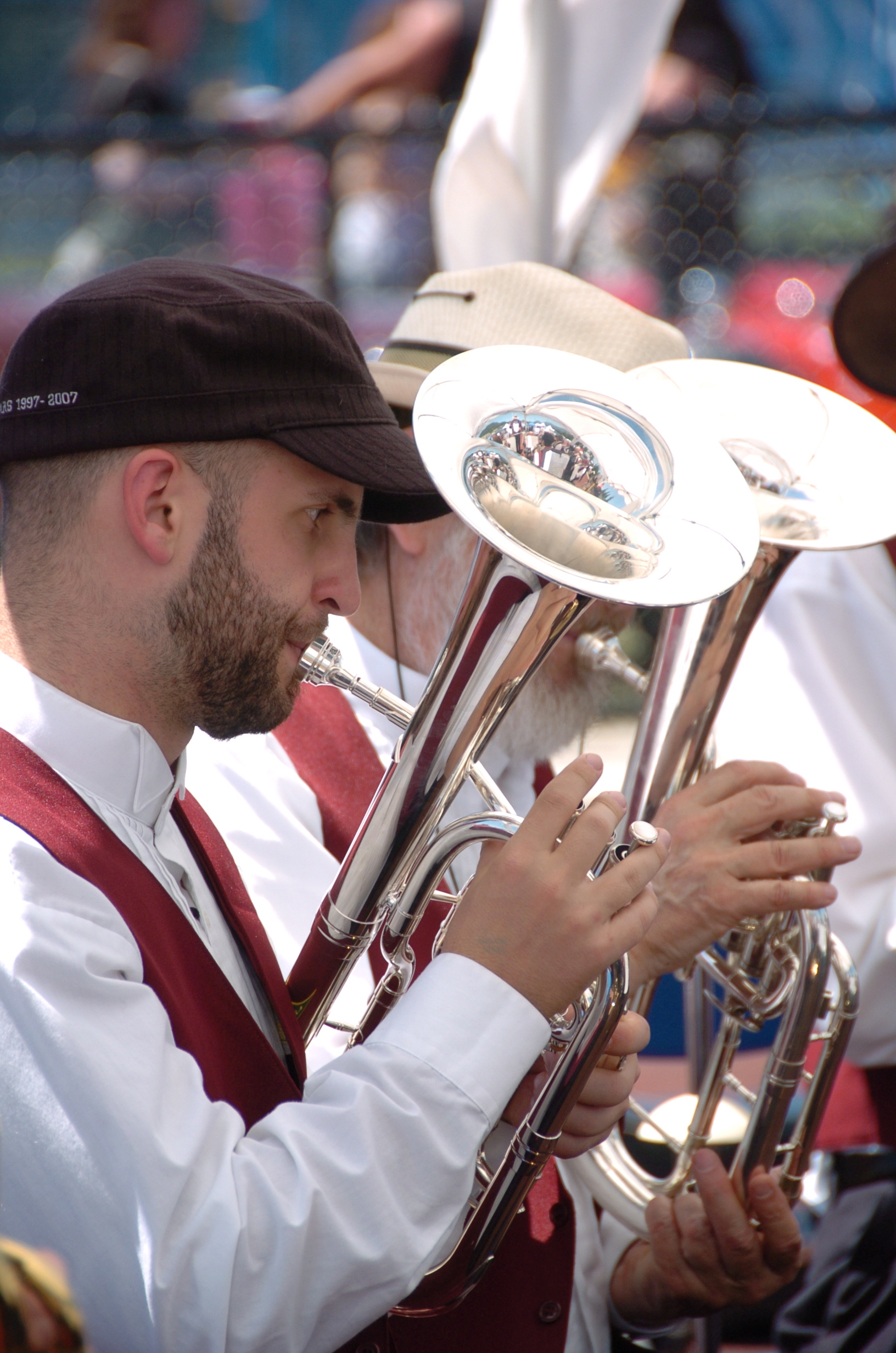
Baritone players at the 2008 Highland Games, British Columbia

The baritone typically forms part of the tenor harmony section of a band, and it can be used to play parts written for the similarly pitched tenor trombone or euphonium. Like players of the cornet and flugelhorn, the euphonium and baritone horn are easily doubled by one player, with some adjustment of breath and embouchure, since they have essentially identical range and fingering.

=== Range ===
On the baritone, the second partial with no valves actuated is B♭_{2} on the second line of the bass clef. The eighth partial with no valves is concert B♭_{4} in the middle of the treble clef. The E_{2} second partial with all three valves actuated is the nominal lowest note on the instrument. Higher notes are possible above B♭_{4} since the upper range is limited only by the fitness of the players' embouchure, although notes above the bell cutoff frequency, around the tenth partial (D_{5}), are more difficult to centre.

Range of a three-valve baritone horn

The lowest notes obtainable depend on the valve setup of the instrument. All three-valve instruments are chromatic down to E_{2}, and four-valve instruments extend that down to at least C_{2}. Non-compensating four-valve instruments suffer from intonation problems in this range and cannot produce low B_{1}. These problems are solved with a compensating fourth valve. The pedals, from B♭_{1} down, are the fundamentals of the instrument's harmonic series. They are more difficult to produce on the baritone than the euphonium, due to its narrower bore and smaller mouthpiece. The extent of the lower end of the pedal range depends on the player's embouchure fitness and the presence of a fourth valve.

=== Notation ===
In British brass bands, all instruments except the bass trombone are transposing instruments using the treble clef notation popularized in France by instrument maker Adolphe Sax for his families of instruments. This system allows band players to easily learn and switch between instruments, since the valve fingering is the same. Like the tenor trombone and euphonium, and also the tenor saxophone and bass clarinet, the baritone when notated in treble clef is a B♭ instrument sounding a major ninth lower than written, an octave below the B♭ trumpet or cornet.

Baritone notation: the same notes in transposing treble clef a ninth above pitch, and in concert pitch in bass clef

In concert bands, the baritone, when not confused with the euphonium, can be treated as a non-transposing instrument written at concert pitch in bass clef and, like the orchestral trombone, with high passages often in tenor clef. Concert band music often provides the baritone parts in both bass and B♭ treble clef to accommodate players from either background, although professional players are usually familiar with either notation. In continental European band music, the baritone and euphonium are occasionally written as B♭ transposing instruments in bass clef, sounding a major second lower than written.

=== Performers ===
In the early 20th century in the United States, the Italian-born trombone, baritone and euphonium virtuoso Simone Mantia (1873–1951) toured with the bands of both John Philip Sousa and Arthur Pryor, made some of the first solo recordings, and helped to popularize the baritone and euphonium in the United States. Leonard Falcone (1899–1985), also Italian-born, was appointed Director of Bands at Michigan State University in 1927, and, as professor of euphonium, taught many euphonium and baritone artists until his death in 1985. The Leonard Falcone International Tuba and Euphonium Festival, a principal venue for tuba family instruments in the United States, was established in his honour.

Some artists within the wind and brass band traditions have championed the baritone horn. Katrina Marzella is a British Yamaha artist, and helped them develop their "Neo" model of baritone horn. She has recorded two albums of baritone horn music, Katrina (2009) and Spotlight (2019), both premiering newly commissioned works. She played solo baritone with Black Dyke Band until her 2024 appointment as the first woman principal conductor of Scotland's champion brass band, The Cooperation Band. Mike Cavanagh is currently principal baritone with Black Dyke Band, and professor of baritone horn at the Royal Northern College of Music.

Helen Harrelson is a British baritone horn soloist, educator, and brass band advocate based in the United States, founding the National Youth Brass Band of America in 2019 and performing with Fountain City Brass Band in Kansas City. She promotes brass band music through teaching, performance, and research. Robert Richardson is a Scottish baritone and euphonium player and held principal positions in the National Youth Brass Band of Scotland, before performing extensively with the US Brass Band of Columbus. He was one of the four baritone soloists to record the band's album Baritones to the Fore! (2008), which included several new compositions.

==== Jazz ====
In jazz, trumpet players will sometimes double on lower valved instruments, including valve trombone and baritone horn. Maynard Ferguson was known to play both, and played baritone horn on his song "Gospel John" (1974).

The soundtrack to the 2023 film Fremont by the Iranian-born Canadian composer Mahmood Schricker features Leandro Joaquim on baritone horn, accompanied by double bass and the Persian setar.

== Repertoire ==
In orchestral music, the baritone horn's contribution is rare. The German composer Gustav Mahler, in his Symphony No. 7, scores for a Tenorhorn, but the part is often played on the euphonium.

Gustav Mahler's Symphony No. 7 Song of the Night, first movement. Opening Tenorhorn solo, bar 2 (concert pitch)
Recording: Utah Symphony Orchestra, conductor Maurice Abravanel, 1965

First movement

Italian composers occasionally call for flicorni in the banda parts in Italian opera, and Ottorino Respighi's off-stage brass parts for his symphonic poem Pini di Roma (1924) include baritone parts marked flicorno tenore in Si♭ intended to be played, if possible, on replicas of the ancient Roman buccina.

In bands, the baritone is used to fill the tenor and baritone texture, and sometimes given solo lines to bridge the gap between the trombones and euphoniums. For solo performances, the lack of original repertoire written specifically for the baritone has hampered its acceptance as a serious instrument. Soloists often have to rely on concertos and other works written for the trombone or euphonium. In 1939, Leonard Falcone published an article in the Music Educators Journal advocating for more solo compositions for the baritone, stating "anyone well acquainted with the instrument cannot deny that the baritone is one of the most, if not the most, expressive of the brass instruments."

In 1948, American composer Alan Hovhaness wrote his Divan Concerto No. 3 for baritone horn and orchestra. In the 21st century, there has been renewed interest in composing works for solo baritone horn, including Philip Sparke's Rhapsody (1991), and concertos with band by Boris Diev (1997), Roger Thorne (2003), Andrew Duncan (2004), Darrol Barry (2006), and Martin Ellerby (2007). British composer Peter Graham wrote his baritone concerto Turbulence, Tide & Torque (2018), which was premiered and recorded by Katrina Marzella.

== Bibliography ==
- Adler-McKean, Jack (2020). The Techniques of Tuba Playing (in multiple languages). Kassel: Bärenreiter. ISBN 978-3-7618-2421-4. OCLC 1201192145. Wikidata Q134349391.
- Apel, Willi, ed. (1969). Harvard Dictionary of Music (2nd ed.). Cambridge: Belknap Press. ISBN 0-674-37501-7. OCLC 21452. Wikidata Q136715895.
- Bevan, Clifford (2000). The Tuba Family (2nd ed.). Winchester: Piccolo Press. ISBN 1-872203-30-2. OCLC 993463927. OL 19533420M. Wikidata Q111040769.
- Bierley, Paul E. (2006). The Incredible Band of John Philip Sousa. Urbana: University of Illinois Press. ISBN 978-0-252-03147-2. OCLC 67345796. OL 21421603M. Wikidata Q136342539.
- Bone, Lloyd E.; Paull, Eric; Morris, R. Winston, eds. (2007). Guide to the Euphonium Repertoire: The Euphonium Source Book. Bloomington: Indiana University Press. ISBN 0-253-34811-0. Wikidata Q135963380.
- Bowman, Brian (2007). "Band and Orchestral Excerpts". In Bone, Lloyd E.; Paull, Eric; Morris, R. Winston (eds.). Guide to the Euphonium Repertoire: The Euphonium Source Book. Bloomington: Indiana University Press. pp. 251–256. ISBN 0-253-34811-0. Wikidata Q135963380.
- Donington, Robert (1962). The Instruments of Music. University Paperbacks (2nd ed.). London: Methuen Publishing. ISBN 0-416-17210-5. OL 25091515M. Wikidata Q136720435.
- Herbert, Trevor; Myers, Arnold; Wallace, John, eds. (2019). The Cambridge Encyclopedia of Brass Instruments. Cambridge University Press. doi:10.1017/9781316841273. ISBN 978-1-316-63185-0. OL 34730943M. Wikidata Q136027509.
- Miller, RJ (2014). Contemporary Orchestration: A Practical Guide to Instruments, Ensembles, and Musicians. New York: Routledge. ISBN 978-0-415-74190-3. Wikidata Q136911157.
- O'Connor, Michael (2007). "A Short History of the Euphonium and Baritone Horn". In Bone, Lloyd E.; Paull, Eric; Morris, R. Winston (eds.). Guide to the Euphonium Repertoire: The Euphonium Source Book. Bloomington: Indiana University Press. pp. 1–18. ISBN 0-253-34811-0. Wikidata Q135963380.
- Pirtle, Scooter (2002), "The evolution of the bugle", in Vickers, Steve (ed.), A History of Drum & Bugle Corps, vol. 1, Madison: Sights & Sounds, OCLC 50171582, Wikidata Q136465477
- Yeo, Douglas (2021). An Illustrated Dictionary for the Modern Trombone, Tuba, and Euphonium Player. Dictionaries for the Modern Musician. Peterson, Lennie (illustrator). Lanham: Rowman & Littlefield. ISBN 978-1-5381-5966-8. LCCN 2021020757. OCLC 1249799159. OL 34132790M. Wikidata Q111040546.
