= John Boda =

American classical composer (1922–2002)

John Boda (2 August 1922, in Boyceville, Wisconsin – 14 April 2002, in Ocala, Florida) was a composer and music professor who taught music theory, composition and piano at Florida State University in Tallahassee, Florida between 1947 and 2001. His papers and collection are at the Warren D. Allen Music Library.

Boda's musical education was at the Eastman School of Music in Rochester, New York. In the late 1940s, he served as assistant conductor to George Szell at the Cleveland Orchestra. During Boda's tenure with the orchestra, he met Igor Stravinsky who made a guest appearance with the orchestra. Boda played the piano part of Petrushka under the baton of Stravinsky. The visit had great impact on the burgeoning neoclassicism of the young Boda. His composition Sinfonia was the product of a large Ford grant in 1960. He often composed in a neo-Classical framework. Boda composed many chamber pieces, including sonatas for most common orchestral instruments. He suffered a stroke in late 1995 that interrupted his compositional activity for a time; however, he soon resumed and produced a number of highly imaginative, profoundly mature works in his final years. Notable students of his include Ellen Taaffe Zwilich, David Ward Steinman, and Jason Overall.
