= Simone Mantia =

American euphonium virtuoso (1873–1951)

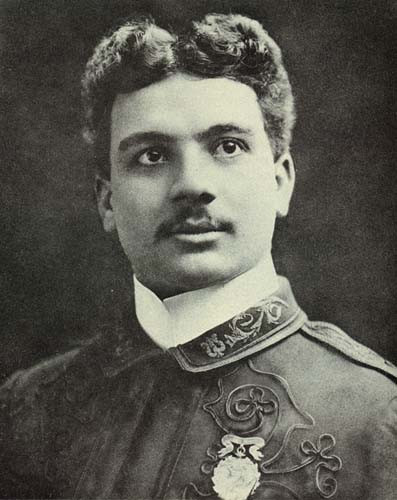
- Simone Mantia around the turn of the century

Background information
- Born: February 6, 1873; Sciacca, Italy
- Died: June 25, 1951 (aged 78); Flushing, New York, USA
- Genres: Concert Band
- Occupation(s): Performer, composer and conductor
- Instrument(s): Euphonium and Trombone
- Years active: 1890-1951
- Labels: Berliner, Zonophone, Edison Records, and Victor Talking Machine
- Website: http://www.simonemantia.com

Simone Mantia (6 February 1873 – 25 June 1951) was an American baritone horn/euphonium virtuoso and also trombone artist at the turn of the twentieth century. He was both a performer and administrator with many American band and orchestral ensembles. On baritone/euphonium he is often cited as the master of the instrument in his time.

== Life ==
Simone Mantia was born on 6 February 1873 in Sciacca, Italy. In 1890, at the age of 17, he immigrated to the United States along with his family. He would spend much of his life in and around New York City, performing in many ensembles and also teaching privately. In later years, he resided with his wife in a very small New York apartment. Simone Mantia died on 25 June 1951 in Flushing, New York. He was survived by his wife.

Mantia is remembered by his students as "very kind, very modest, and very unassuming" as well as just generally having been a "nice guy" who rarely allowed any frustration or anger to enter into his demeanor. He suffered from a speech deficit, though what portion of that may have been merely accent is not well documented.

== Career in music ==
Simone Mantia began, like many Italian baritone masters, playing alto horn at the age of 9. At age 12, he started lessons on valve trombone and the larger baritone horn. By the time he arrived in New York, he played with sufficient proficiency to earn a living in music. He jobbed initially with groups including the Jules Levy and Schneider Bands on baritone/euphonium and the Brooklyn Opera on valve trombone – switching to slide trombone in only a week when so required to keep the gig.

In 1895, he replaced Josef Michele Rafayollo, with whom he had been studying, as soloist with the Sousa Band. This was the first nationally known ensemble he performed with, and one of only two in which he played euphonium primarily. As a trombonist, he later took jobs with other nationally ranked ensembles including New York's Metropolitan Opera, which he joined in 1908 and remained involved with for 37 years, the last dozen as its manager. He also played trombone with The New York Philharmonic, The NBC Symphony, The Chicago Lyric Opera, The Philadelphia Grand Opera, Victor Herbert's Orchestra, and the Arthur Pryor Band in which he primarily served as baritone/euphonium soloist and assistant director (often referred to as Pryor's "second in command")

Mantia held many jobs in music beyond that of performer. He left the Sousa band with Arthur Pryor to help Pryor found and run his group. Like all performers, he also took private students, though a student recalled him as "not very good at all" when it came to teaching those less gifted than himself.

Simone Mantia was the first master of euphonium to work in the era of recorded sound. As a result, he left a legacy of recordings that have been reproduced into the twenty-first century. He recorded as euphonium soloist on several Sousa and Pryor band recordings. He also soloed with the NBC Symphony on recordings as a trombonist. He recorded primarily on the Edison Records and Victor Talking Machine labels. His recorded legacy extends even to YouTube where a recording of Mantia playing a euphonium solo titled Priscilla, which he wrote and dedicated to Sousa's daughter of the same name, can be heard.

In addition to performing and managing, Mantia also composed and arranged. His solos include "The Southerner", "Priscilla", "Fantaisie Original", "Auld Lang Syne" and the oft-parodied by Looney Tunes "Believe Me If All Those Endearing Young Charms".

His diversity of musical endeavor as well as his fame as a soloist led to C.G. Conn Ltd., a maker of brass instruments, taking him on as a sponsored artist. Conn built a number of American style euphoniums, sold as baritones, that were structurally a mix of baritone and euphonium, one of which Mantia would continue to play for the rest of his life.

== Virtuoso performer ==
=== Baritone / Euphonium ===
Simone Mantia began his playing career in Sicily, in a land dominated by the continental baritone horn instrument and style. Mantia crossed over between the continental sound and that of the classic British brass band euphonium. Unlike the next Italian Maestro on baritone to emigrate to the US, Leonard Falcone, he did not care for the vibrato and other aspects of this particular sound and rebelled, refusing to play with any vibrato at all. Playing on an American baritone, and mixing the warmth and power of the sounds of his homeland with the clarity and lack of excess that he favored, Mantia was truly unique.

At times, Mantia would adjust the timbre of his instrument to match the demands of the part. While with the Sousa and Pryor bands, Mantia had favored a double-bell euphonium, the lesser bell of which being on a much more cylindrical extension of the bore, produced a more baritone-like, or even trombone-like timbre.

While not caring for vibrato and other ornamentation of the sound, Mantia added fire and excitement to his performance through improvisation, adding notes and runs, jumping octaves, and playing faster than anyone else. Arthur Lehman described one section of Fantaisie Original as played by Mantia as consisting of "twice as many notes as I have written on the part". He was able to articulate remarkably fast, and an apocryphal story survives that his widow later claimed that Mantia did not even know how to triple-tongue. This would make his high-speed antics challenging if not impossible.

Many nineteenth century brass band instruments without orchestral roles slipped into obscurity in the early to mid twentieth century, slide cornet, cornet, alto horn, tenor horn, and flugelhorn among them. The baritone and its dominant cousin the euphonium are unique as non-orchestral brass that remain in the concert band. Mantia's role in popularizing the instrument as a virtuoso, followed by Leonard Falcone, Arthur W. Lehman, Brian Bowman, Toru Miura (Musician), Steven Mead, and others is considered significant.

=== Trombone ===
Mantia learned to play a used slide trombone in place of valve in only 5 days to keep his job with the Brooklyn Opera. He found at least as much, if not more, work as a trombonist as he did playing baritone. Once Arthur Pryor left the Sousa Band and started his own, Mantia became indispensable as a soloist. Pryor would often elect not to perform and it fell to Mantia to cover the solo responsibility in his stead. He continued in this role through at least 1917.
