= Roseto Valfortore =

- Comune
- Comune di Roseto Valfortore
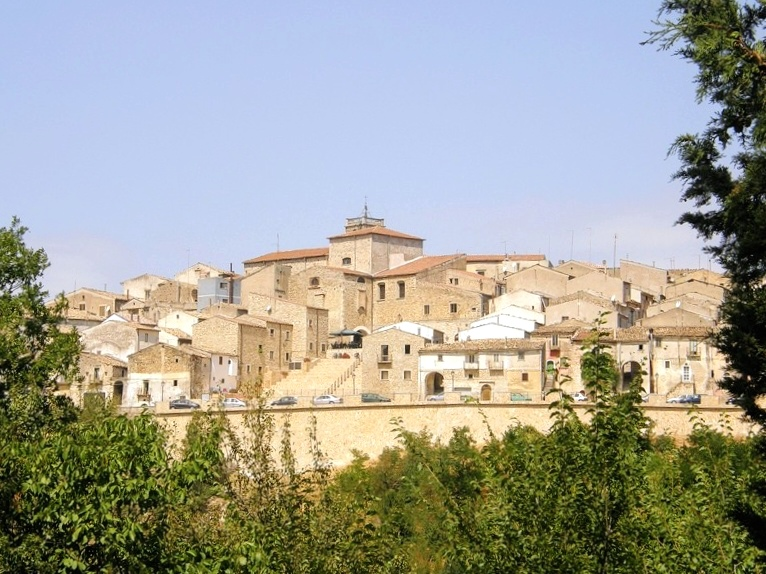
- View of Roseto Valfortore

- Coat of arms

- Location within Italy Location within Apulia
- Coordinates: 41°22′N 15°6′E
- Country: Italy
- Region: Apulia
- Province: Foggia

Government
  - Mayor: Lucilla Parisi

Area
  - Total: 50.06 km^{2} (19.33 sq mi)
- Elevation: 650 m (2,130 ft)

Population (31 December 2016)
  - Total: 1,080
  - Density: 21.6/km^{2} (55.9/sq mi)
- Demonym: Rosetani
- Time zone: UTC+1 (CET)
  - Summer (DST): UTC+2 (CEST)
- Postal code: 71039
- Dialing code: 0881
- Patron saint: St. Philip Neri
- Saint day: May 26
- Website: Official website

Roseto Valfortore (Irpino: Rusìte) is a small town and comune of the Province of Foggia, in the Apulia Region of southeastern Italy.

Located in the Daunian Mountains near Fortore springs, Roseto Valfortore is one of I Borghi più belli d'Italia ("The most beautiful villages of Italy").

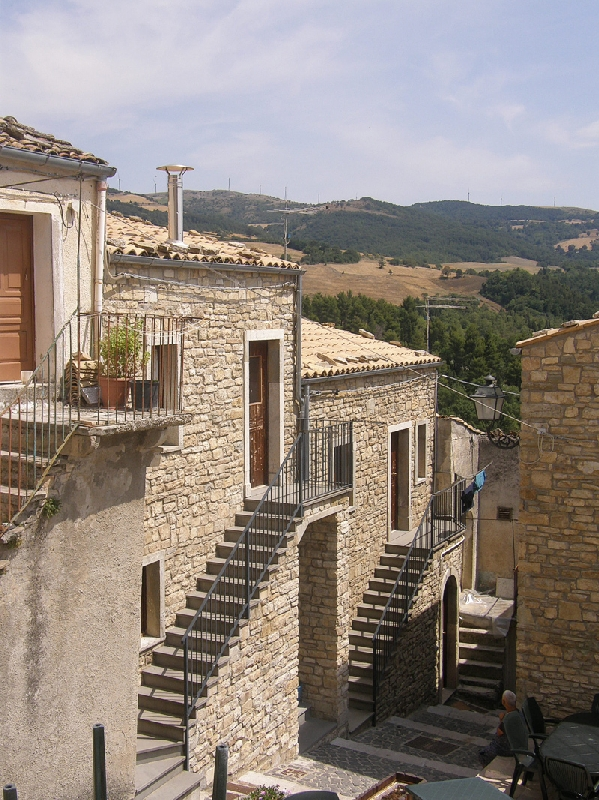
Stone houses in Roseto Valfortore

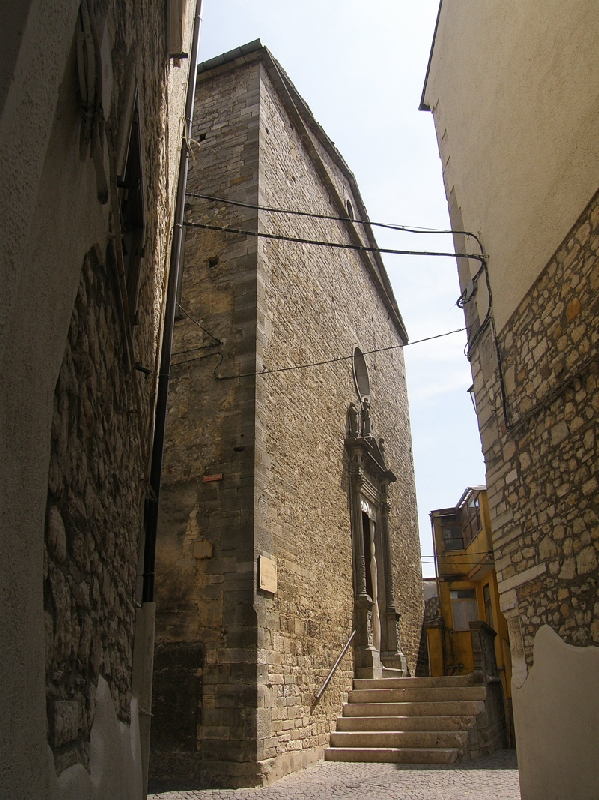
Stone facade of Santa Maria Assunta church

== Geography ==
The landscape surrounding Roseto Valfortore is rolling hills and low mountains, with the river Fortore flowing below the town. It gives the valley its name, Valfortore ("Valley of the Fortore"). The hills surrounding Roseto have electric power windmills.

Roseto Valfortore is a traditional Italian hill town, with predominantly stone and masonry buildings in the older sections. Historic stone churches include the Cappella della Consolazione, Santa Maria Assunta, and San Nicola.

== Emigration ==
There have been numerous waves of emigration from the town of Roseto Valfortore since the late 19th century. The first immigrants to the United States from there arrived in the Lehigh Valley of Pennsylvania in 1883, to work in the local slate quarries. They settled in Bangor first, then bought land in the area, and established the settlement of Roseto, an Italian cultural enclave named after their home village. In 1894 alone, 1,200 residents of Roseto Valfortore applied for passports to the U.S.

From 1900 through 1950s it was recorded that many migrated to Youngstown, Ohio and surrounding areas. Many migrants worked in the steel mills in Ohio. Throughout the 1950s and 1960s more than 3,000 Rosetani migrated to Toronto and its surrounding areas, as well as to Washington D.C. Some went further west into Summit County Ohio and obtained jobs in the rubber industry founded by FA Seiberling [Goodyear Tire and Rubber] and BF Goodrich [Goodrich Tire]. They established private clubs and referred to themselves as Rosetans. There were two such Rosetan Clubs in Akron Ohio.
