= Toru Miura =

Japanese euphonist (born 1948)

Toru Miura 三浦 徹
- Born: September 1, 1948 (age 77); Osaka, Japan
- Occupation(s): Musician, professor
- Instrument: Euphonium

Toru Miura (三浦 徹, Miura Tōru) is a Japanese euphonium player and professor at Kunitachi College of Music. He is a founding member of the International Tuba Euphonium Association (ITEA), formerly named Tubist Universal Brotherhood Association (TUBA).

== Education ==
Miura studied with Kiyoshi Ohishi at the Conservatory of Music of Tokyo University of the Arts, graduating with a bachelor's degree in 1971. He completed a masters in 1973, studying with Ray Young at the University of Southern Mississippi. This was followed by studies at the Eastman School of Music in New York, where he played in the Eastman Wind Ensemble under Donald Hunsberger, and also studied with Cherry Beauregard.

== Career ==
Miura attended the first TUBA International Symposium in 1973. After returning to Japan, he went on to become a euphonium soloist with the Tokyo Kosei Wind Ensemble from 1978 to 2007. He founded the Tokyo Bari-Tuba Ensemble and The Euphonium Company, and is the Japanese representative of ITEA, of which he is a founding member and director. Recognizing his role in promoting the euphonium outside of its traditional western environment, and advancing the wind symphony movement, ITEA awarded Miura a lifetime achievement award. He has served as professor of euphonium at Toho Gakuen School of Music, Soai University, Sobi Music Academy, and Kunitachi College of Music, the former Tokyo Conservatory of Music, where he remained on the faculty as of 2011.

== Instrument ==
Miura was a Besson featured artist and used their Besson Prestige BE2052 and BE2051 euphoniums.
