= List of euphonium, baritone horn and tenor horn manufacturers =

A list of baritone horn, euphonium, tenor horn, tenor tuba and marching baritone horn manufacturers past and present. Most of these companies produce or produced tenor brass as part of an overall band instrument catalogue.

== Active manufacturers ==
- Adams Musical Instruments, Dutch manufacturer of percussion instruments that recently started making brass instruments. Took over the Hirsbrunner workshop.
- Alexander, family-owned manufacturer established 1782, builds traditional European baritones and tubas as well as other brass.
- Amati Kraslice, Czech wind instrument company, makes piston valve brass band instruments.
- B&S (originally: Blechblas & Signalinstrumentenfabrik), German musical instrument manufacturer, produces tubas, and oval-shape rotary valve tenor and baritone instruments. Owned by Buffet Crampon.
- BAC Music, based in Kansas City, US producer of marching brass ("825" brand) and band brass instruments.
- Besson, a subsidiary of Buffet Crampon, manufactures brass band instruments in Germany, France and India.
- Blessing, subsidiary of St. Louis Music, manufactures baritones and other marching brass in the United States.
- Červený, Czech brass instrument manufacturer of mostly European-style tenor and low brass with rotary valves. Subsidiary of Amati Kraslice.
- Conn-Selmer manufactures instruments under Conn, King, Leblanc, and Holton names at multiple facilities in the United States.
- Eastman Winds, makes a variety of instruments including Chinese-made tenor and low brass.
- Geneva, based in the UK, instruments are made in Czech Republic by Amati Kraslice.
- Jinbao, Chinese manufacturer based in Tianjin, widely re-sold as inexpensive stencil instruments.
- Jupiter Band Instruments, a subsidiary of KHS Musical Instruments which manufactures tenor brass in Taiwan.
- Melton Meinl Weston, a tenor and low brass manufacturer since 1810 in Bohemia and Germany. Owned by Buffet Crampon.
- Miraphone, German manufacturer of tenor and low brass instruments, based in Waldkraiburg.
- Schiller, Chinese-made stencilled Jinbao instruments.
- Sterling, a British manufacturer of tenor brass, owned by John Packer.
- Taishan, a Chinese manufacturer of brass instruments (Shan Dong Taishan).
- Wessex Tubas, UK-based, Chinese-made instruments.
- Weril, Brazilian instrument maker founded by an Austrian family in São Paulo in 1909, includes baritones and euphoniums.
- Willson, Swiss manufacturer of brass band instruments, particularly tubas and euphoniums. Owned by Eastman Music.
- Yamaha Musical Instruments, a division of Yamaha Corporation. Japanese manufacturer of musical instruments including tenor and baritone brass.

== Historic manufacturers ==
- John Lathrop Allen, a Massachusetts firm that built tenor brass including the oldest known side lever action rotary instrument (a baritone), in the 1840s and 50s.
- Graves and Co., a Boston Massachusetts firm that built tenor brass ancestors of baritone and tenor horns before 1869
- E.G. Wright and Company, a Boston Massachusetts firm that built tenor brass from 1841 to 1869
- Boston Musical Instrument Company, incorporated as the Boston Musical Instrument Manufactury as a merger of Graves & Co. and E.G. Wright, built tenor brass from 1869 to 1928
- Hall Instrument Company, established 1862, merged with Quinby Brothers to form
- Quinby and Hall Band Instruments, established 1866, which became
- Hall, Quinby and Wright Company in 1870 with the brief partnership of E.G. Wright (d. 1871), transitioning the company to
- Hall and Quinby, until Hall left the company creating
- Quinby Brothers, established 1876, which was purchased by Thomson and Odell to form
- The Standard Band Instrument Company, established 1884, which was ultimately bought by guitar company
- The Vega Company which manufactured brass instruments from 1909 to 1939.
- Kanstul Musical Instruments, Founded in 1981 by the late Zig Kanstul, made an extensive line of brass instruments until its closure in 2020, including historic replicas as well as production for other brands, based in Anaheim, California.
- V. F. Červený & Synové, a Bohemian brass instrument maker established in 1845 and absorbed into the Czech national socialist instrument cooperative after WWII following the expulsion of the ethnic German craftspeople of the region. The name is now utilized by Amati Kraslice (Kraslice being formerly the Bohemian town of Grazlitz) which emerged as the private identity of the former state cooperative.
- Hirsbrunner, Swiss manufacturer of tenor brass and tubas. Workshop and tooling acquired by Adams.
- H.N. White, the makers of “King” musical instruments in Ohio from 1893 to 1965, which after several mergers and acquisitions still exists as a brand of Conn-Selmer
- C. G. Conn, the original instrument firm founded by Colonel Charles Gerard Conn in 1879 (mouthpiece company founded in 1874). Conn sold out in 1915 and the company and name have transformed through many mergers, and sales ultimately becoming a brand of Conn-Selmer.
- York Band Instrument Company, founded by James Warren York, manufactured tenor brass and mouthpieces for them from 1883 to 1917. Alternate names included Smith & York, York & Holton and York & Sons.
- Frank Holton & Company, founded in 1896, is still an active brand of Conn-Selmer, but no longer manufactures tenor brass such as the “Falcone Model” baritone of the late 70s.
- Buescher Band Instrument Company manufactured tenor brass in Elkhart Indiana from 1894 – until being sold to Selmer (now Conn-Selmer) in 1963.
- Seidel Band Instrument Company manufactured tenor brass from 1914 to 1918 when it was bought by
- E.A. Couturier which manufactured mostly Couturier's patented cornets, but also tenor brass from 1918 until 1923 when Couturier lost his eyesight and the company, the assets of which were bought by
- Lyon & Healy, which manufactured tenor brass from 1923 until halting instrument production in 1929.
- Distin & Co which made brass instruments in London from 1849 until 1868 when it was sold to
- Boosey & Company (established before 1851) manufactured tenor brass from 1868 until its 1930 merger with
- Hawkes & Son, established 1865, which created
- Boosey and Hawkes which manufactured tenor brass in England and France from 1930 until instrument production was halted by a succession of sales and financial problems in 2003.
- Olds, former US brass instrument manufacturer established 1910, ceasing operations in 1978 with an auction of all assets, including Reynolds (merged in 1964).
- Vincent Bach Corporation, founded in 1918 in New York initially to manufacture trumpet mouthpieces, then trumpets, trombones and similar brass instruments. It manufactured baritones in the mid-twentieth century, during a progression of changes in ownership. As a brand of Conn-Selmer, the Bach name is no longer used for tenor brass.
- DEG Music, established by Don E. Getzen in 1965, manufactured "Dynasty" marching band baritones, bugles and tubas. Owned by St. Louis Music as a brand of lyres and other marching accessories.

== Sources ==
The summary notes in this list are taken from the Wikipedia pages referenced within except as noted below.
