= Boston Musical Instrument Company =

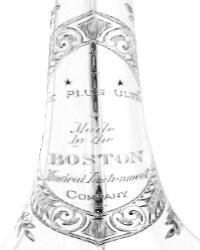
- Typical bell face engraving on later BMIC horns
- Company type: Brass Instrument Manufacturer
- Industry: Musical Instruments
- Predecessor: E.G. Wright & Co. merger with Graves & Co.
- Founded: 1869 as Boston Musical Instrument Manufactory
- Founder: E.G. Wright, Samuel Graves, William Graves, George Graves, Henry Esbach, & Louis Hartman
- Defunct: 1928
- Fate: Name phased out in 1928
- Successor: Cundy-Bettony
- Headquarters: 71 Sudbury Street, later 51 Chardon Street, Boston, Mass., United States
- Products: Brass Band Instruments

The Boston Musical Instrument Company was an American manufacturer of brass band instruments in the late 19th and early 20th centuries located in Boston, Massachusetts.

== History ==
Elbridge Wright was an apprentice to Samuel Graves at his original woodwind shop which had been founded in the 1820s in West Fairlee, Vermont and later headquartered in Winchester, New Hampshire. While in Winchester, James Keat, who had apprenticed to his father Samuel in England around the turn of the century, introduced the Graves firm to brasswind instrument manufacture. Wright learned from both Graves and Keat before setting out on his own.

In 1869, the E.G. Wright Company of Boston, Massachusetts (established in 1841) and Graves & Co. of Winchester, New Hampshire combined to form the Boston Musical Instrument Manufactury located at 71 Sudbury Street, Boston. The partnership included Elbrdige G. (EG) Wright, Samuel, William and George Graves, and Wright’s "practical partners" Henry Esbach and Louis Hartman.

E.G. Wright left the company shortly thereafter to join the firm of Hall and Quinby (established by David Hall in 1862) which became The Hall Quinby Wright Company until Wright’s death in 1871. In the 1869 Catalogue announcing the formation of the Boston Musical Instrument Manufactury, an opening letter to customers cautions against any firms that might “advertise in the old name in order to enhance the value of inferior instruments”. The continued use of E.G. Wright & Co. tools, patterns and craftsman was assured in the same. Hall and Quinby would be bought by Thomas and Odell in 1884 changing its name to the Standard Band Instrument company and then again in 1909 by the Vega Company.

E.G. Wright and Company had been founded in 1841 and continued as the Boston Musical Instrument Manufactury uninterrupted at 71 Sudbury until 1902 when the name was changed to the Boston Musical Instrument Company. This change coincided with a relocation to 51 Chardon Street in Boston. Two years later the company was purchased by Cundy-Bettony which continued to build instruments in the Boston name until 1928.

== Products ==
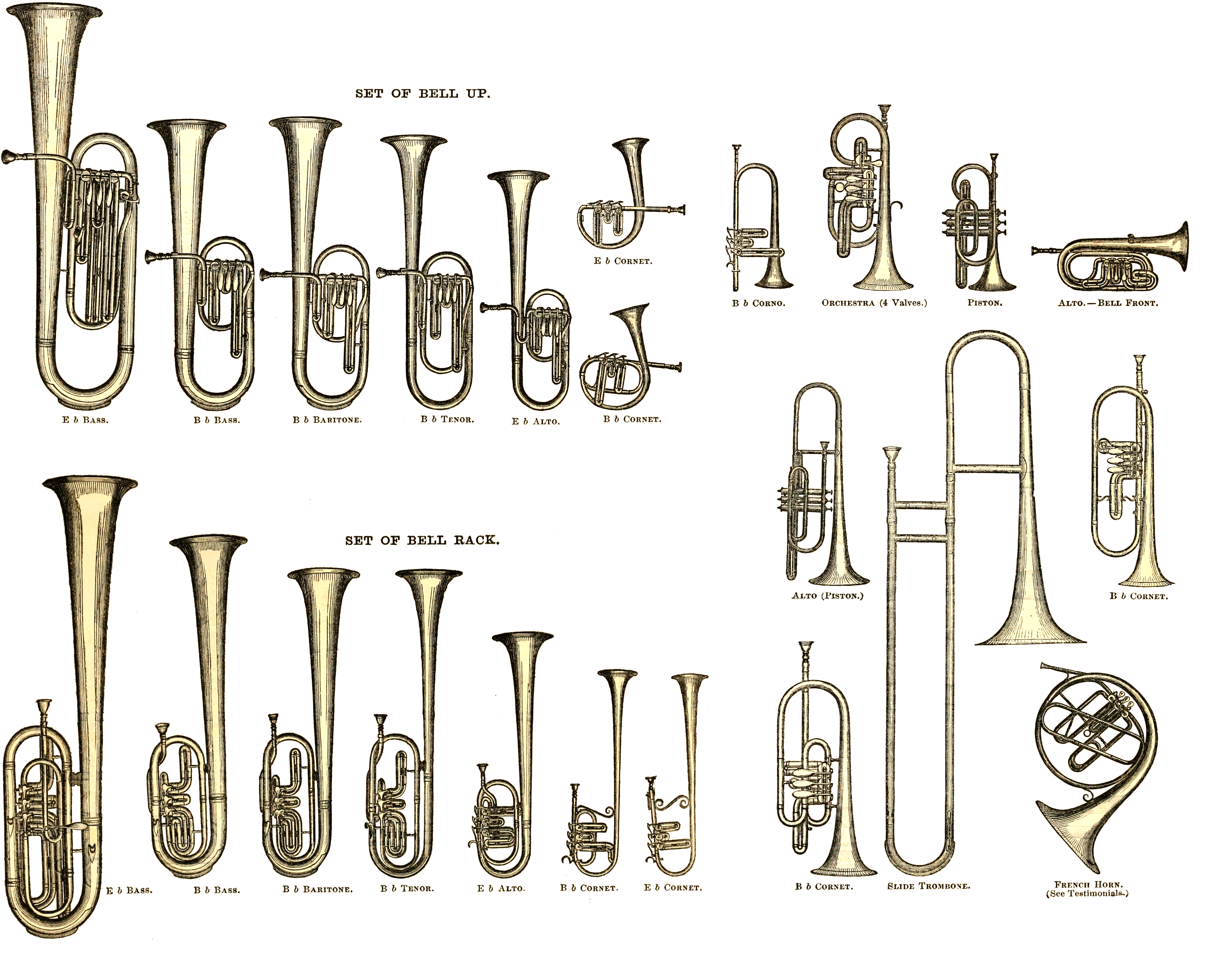
Illustrations from the original 1869 catalogue. left top: upright bell, left bottom: over the shoulder, right: cornets, (valve trombone, flugelhorn,) slide trombone, (trumpet,) and French horn.

The Boston Musical Instrument Manufactury/Company was a producer of traditional instruments for brass band. The 1869 catalog shows a full line of such instruments including the traditional cornets in E-flat and B-flat, E-flat Alto horn and horn, B-flat tenor, B-flat baritone, B-flat valve trombone and slide trombone, and tubas in B-flat and E-flat. Slide cornet was another option. The company also offered the full range of instruments in upright bell and over the shoulder configurations.

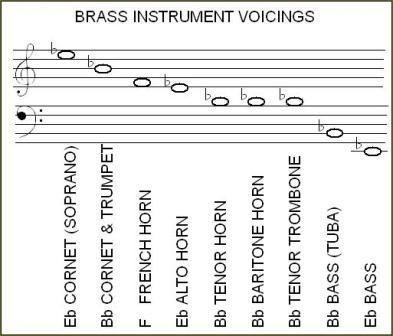

Initially, most valved instruments were offered in rotary valve configurations with piston valve cornet and alto horn being the only exceptions. The rotary valve is a string operated dual-bored axial valve actuated by a lever pressed with the fingers. A piston valve is directly actuated by downward finger pressure on the top of a dual-bored piston over a spring. Rotary valves were common in central Europe in the mid 19th century while piston valves were the preferred configuration in British brass bands.

Among the American firms competing with Boston were the H.N. White Company, The Standard Band Instrument Company, C.G. Conn, Ltd., F.E. Olds, E.A. Couturier Co., Ltd., the Frank Holton Company and the J.W. York Company. All manufactured similar full lines for band.

== Herbert L. Clarke ==
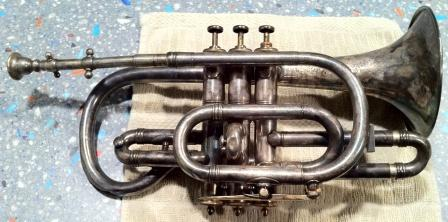
A Boston 3-star cornet made in 1883.

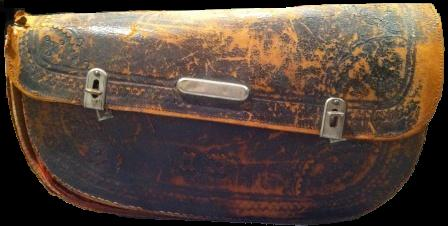
The leather case for above.

Noted cornet virtuoso Herbert L. Clarke, author of many solos for cornet and successful touring soloist of the turn of the 20th century, purchased a Boston 3-star cornet for his first professional quality horn. He purchased this horn after several months of saving following his graduation from high school and relocation to Indianapolis from Toronto in 1884. The Boston 3-star cornets were popular horns of the day and are still respected by collectors and antique cornet enthusiasts. These horns carried the inscription “Ne Plus Ultra” on the bell, Latin for "nothing more beyond". Clarke had learned to play on his brother’s horn and then had played professionally for a time on a band provided Courtois. Clarke did not stay with the Boston for very long, changing horns and manufacturers many times in his career.

== Volume and serialization ==
The Boston Musical Instrument Manufactury/Company was a low volume producer by modern standards.

The company produced only 4000 to 4500 total instruments in each decade of the 1880s, 1890s, 1900s and 1910s. Boston serial numbers do not appear on horns prior to 1880 and begin in the 6000s.

Around 1890 the serial numbers were in the 10,000 range, in 1900 the 15,000 range, in 1910 the 19,500 range, and in 1920 the 24,500 range. Horns built after 1914 (serial numbers 22,000 and above) were manufactured after the departure of the original owners from the firm.
