= F. A. Reynolds =

Brass instrument designer (1883–1960)

- Born: Foster Allen Reynolds; December 29, 1883; United States
- Died: July 18, 1960 (aged 76); Fullerton, California, U.S.
- Occupation: Instrument maker

Foster Allen Reynolds (December 29, 1883 – July 18, 1960) was an American brass instrument designer and manufacturer.

== Career ==
=== Early years ===
Reynolds began as an apprentice with the brass band instrument manufacturer J. W. York. At York, he learned brass band instrument design in a tradition that traced its lineage back through James Warren York, the company's founder, and the Boston Musical Instrument Company, which in turn had been formed by the union of the E. G. Wright Company and Graves & Co, which had been making instruments since the 1820s and the advent of valved brass instruments.

In 1904, Reynolds left York to take a position with the H. N. White company, the maker of "King" instruments. There, he transitioned from craftsman to shop superintendent. Reynolds worked for 30 years at King in Cleveland, Ohio, rising far in the company.

=== F. A. Reynolds Company ===
Reynolds established the F. A. Reynolds Company in 1936 to produce his own brand of band instruments. Reynolds developed a reputation for his instruments' excellent acoustics and superior craftsmanship. He spent 10 years with his company, developing successful lines of cornets, trumpets, baritone horns, French horns, and bass trombones, among other instruments. The company realized significant sales of instruments to the United States Armed Forces during the Second World War. At the age of 61, Reynolds sold the company to Scherl & Roth in 1946.

While at F. A. Reynolds, he teamed with other notable brass men of the day to work on the Martin Committee trumpet in 1939. He also established the Ohio Band Instrument Company, concurrently owned by himself, his brother Harper, and Max Scherl of Scherl & Roth. This spin-off company became wholly owned by Scherl & Roth at the same time they purchased F. A. Reynolds.

=== Retirement and F. E. Olds ===
The year after selling his company to retire, Reynolds was lured to F. E. Olds by Maurice Berlin, the president of Olds's parent company, Chicago Musical Instruments. Reynolds moved to Los Angeles, California, and took control of the Olds factory there. By 1948, this involvement lead to the birth of the Olds Ambassador line of cornets, trumpets, and trombones, which Olds sold for decades. In 1953, Reynolds took on an apprentice, Zigmant Kanstul, who would serve as plant superintendent after Reynolds's death until 1970. Reynolds died on the job from a heart attack in the presence of Kanstul and others at the Olds plant in Fullerton, California.

== Company legacy ==
F. E. Olds has been reconstituted and is selling Olds and Reynolds branded instruments with a headquarters in Westfield, New Jersey. The original F. E. Olds company closed its doors in 1979, still managed by one of the employees present with Reynolds at his death. The Ohio Band Instrument Company name went away around 1950.

== Personal life ==
Reynolds was married twice and had three children. His marriage to Frances Dean at the age of 19 lasted 31 years before ending in divorce. His second marriage, to Myrtle Rozelle, lasted the remainder of his life. He entered the workforce at the age of 19, in 1903, and died on the job on July 18, 1960, at the age of 76.
