= Tenor horn =

Brass instrument in the saxhorn family

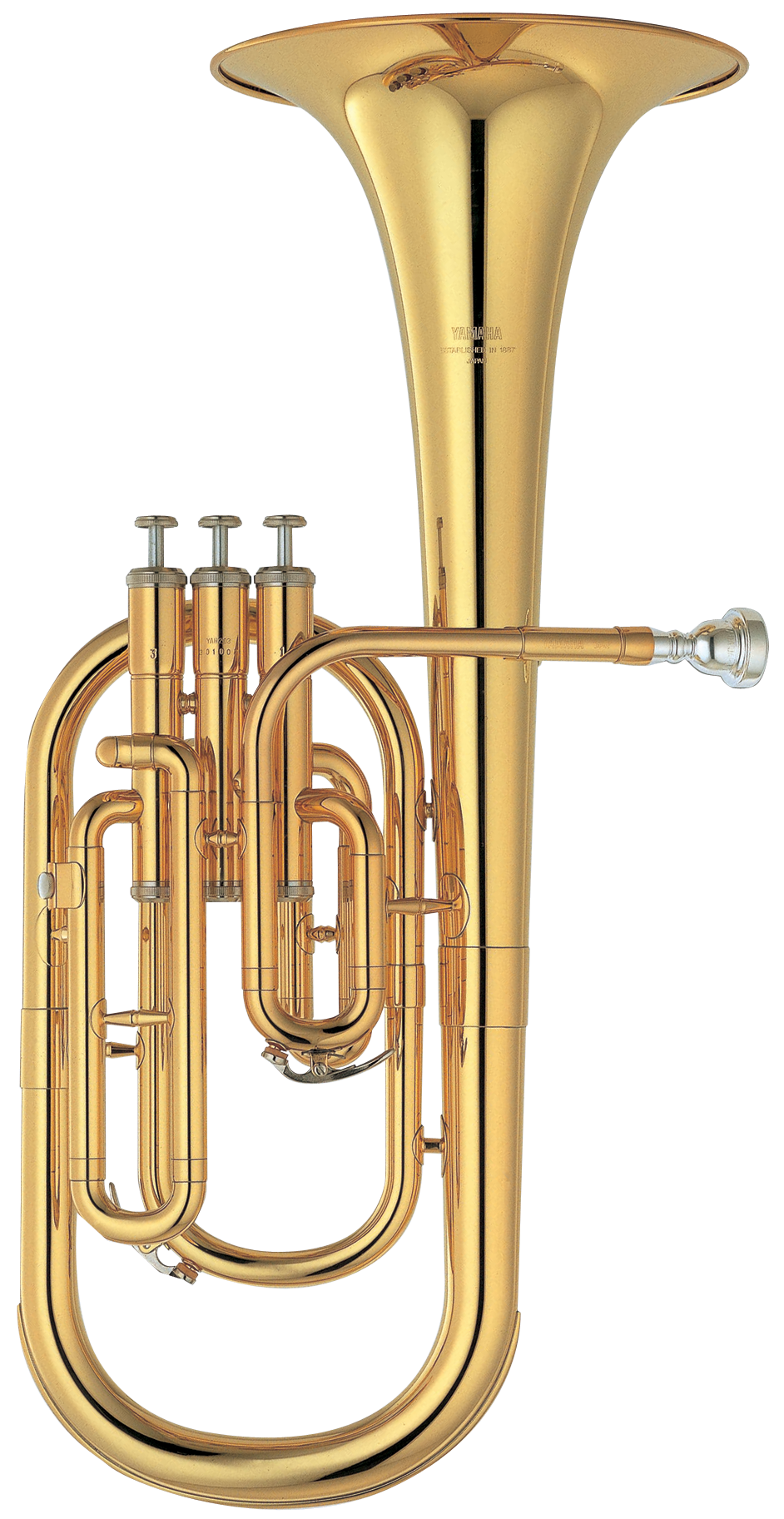
- Yamaha tenor horn in E♭

Brass instrument
- Other names: American English: alto horn, peck horn; German: Althorn; French: saxhorn alto, saxhorn ténor, pichote; Italian: flicorno contralto, genis; Spanish: trompa alto, onnoven; Mexican Spanish: saxor, charchet
- Classification: Aerophone; Wind; Labrosone; Saxhorn
- Hornbostel–Sachs classification: 423.232 (valved labrosone with moderately conical bore)

Playing range
- The tessitura for E♭ tenor horn is A_{2} to E♭_{5}. Notated in treble clef sounding a major sixth lower than written.

Related instruments
- Saxhorn; Flugelhorn; Baritone; Horn; Mellophone; Cornet

Builders
- List of euphonium, baritone horn and tenor horn manufacturers

The tenor horn (British English; alto horn in American English, sometimes E♭ horn) is a brass instrument in the saxhorn family pitched in E♭ with three piston valves. It has a bore that is moderately conical, like the cornet and baritone, and normally uses a deep funnel-shaped mouthpiece. In continental Europe it is known as the Althorn and commonly has rotary valves and an oval shape.

It is most commonly used to play inner harmonies and off-beats in British brass bands and Mexican banda music, reading transposing treble clef, whereas the horn dominates in concert bands and orchestras. In the late 20th century it began to be considered as a serious solo voice, and has amassed a repertoire of contemporary concertos and other solo works.

== History ==
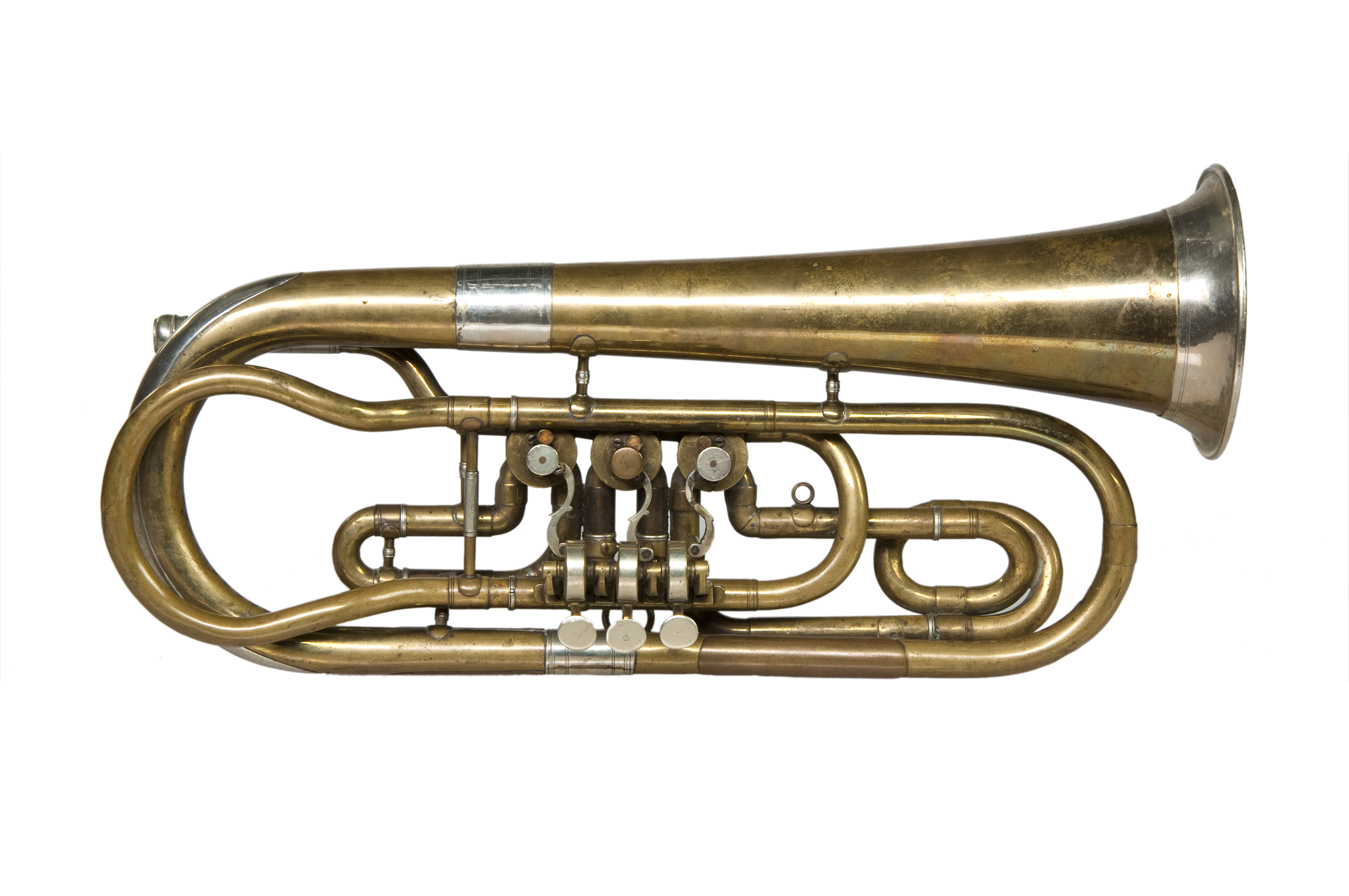
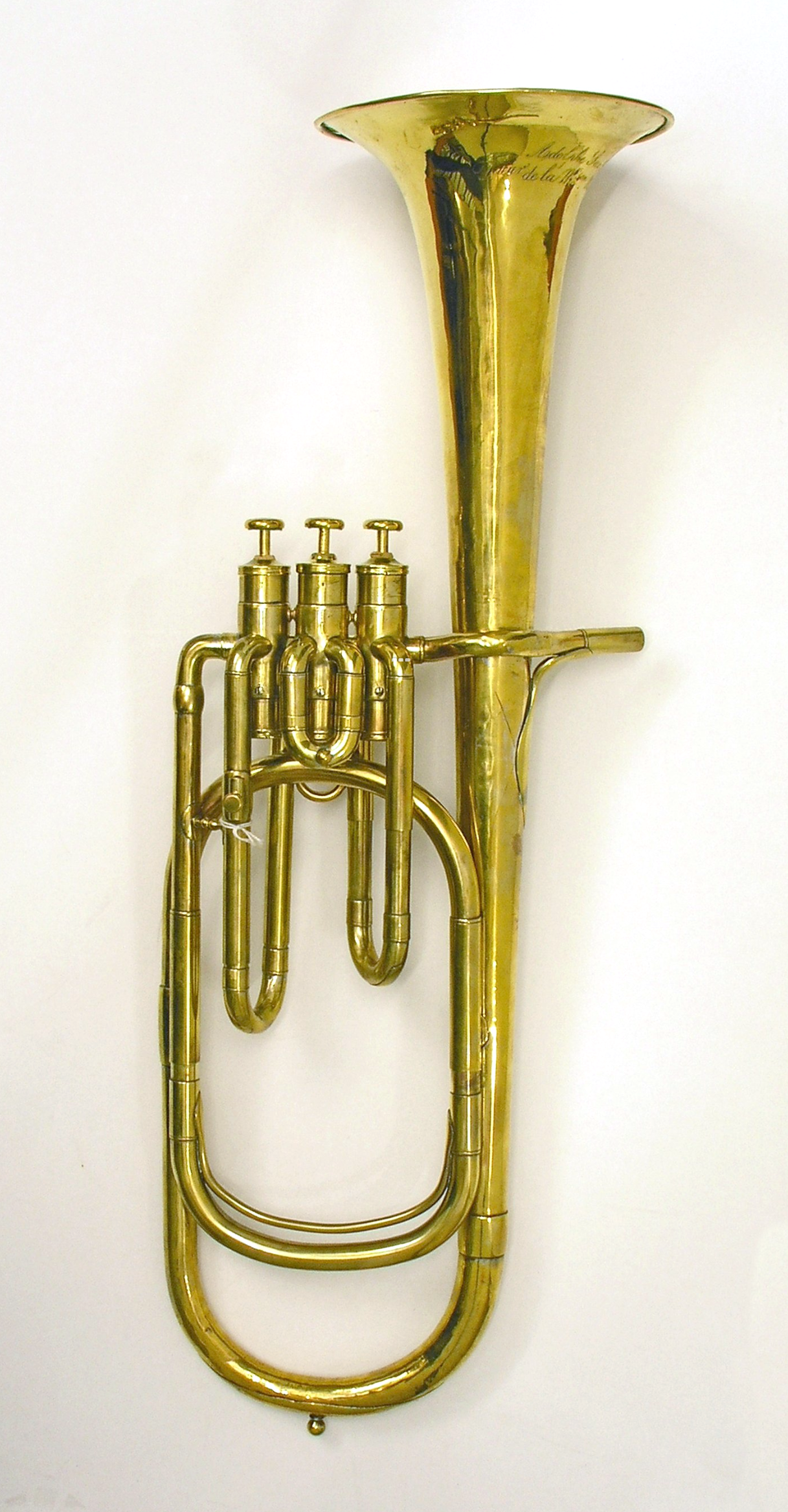
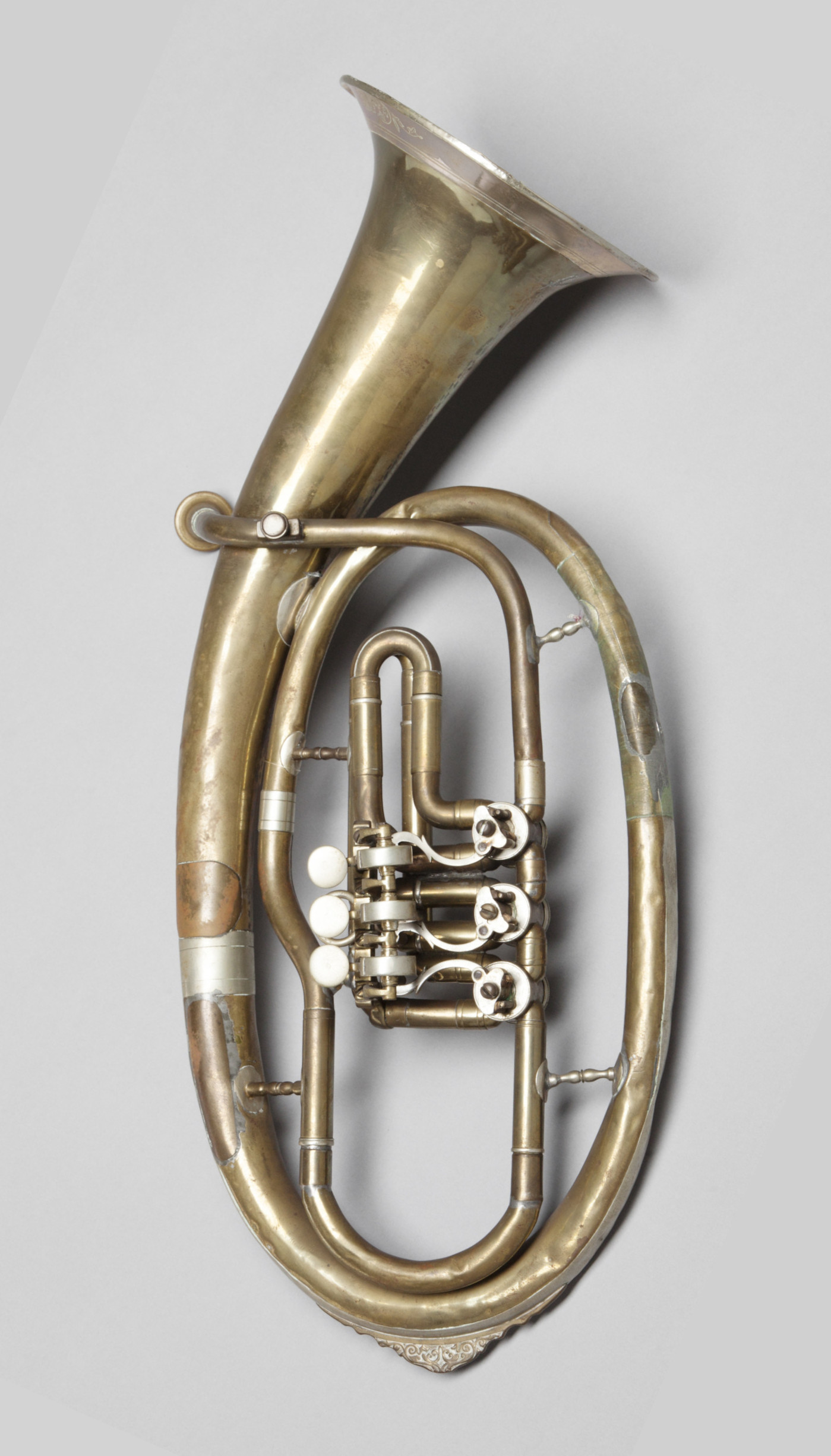
Althorn in E♭ by Wahl, c. 1850–1870, top; Tenor saxhorn in E♭ by Adolphe Sax, 1855; Althorn in E♭ with oval form, c. 1900 by Glier (Scenkonstmuseet, Stockholm; University of Edinburgh; Musikinstrumentenmuseum, Berlin)

The tenor horn found in British-style brass bands was derived from the French saxhorn ténor, a mid-voiced member of the family of saxhorns invented in the 1840s by the Paris-based instrument maker Adolphe Sax. Bore diameter measurements of historical instruments by Sax correspond more closely to his saxotromba patent, which describes a separate family of instruments with narrower bore, although only the E♭ ténor and B♭ baryton were ever built. The earliest 19th century models were made with Berlin valves.

The saxhorns became standard in bands in Britain and the United States due largely to the Distin family, who helped popularise brass bands, promoting and performing widely on Sax's brass instruments. By 1850 Distin & Co. was manufacturing them in London, and in New York and Pennsylvania by the 1870s after the London business was purchased by Boosey & Co. Distin dropped the name saxhorn early on, adopting the names tenor horn, baritone horn and euphonium instead, names still used for the modern instruments common in bands.

In Prussia, early valved instruments with similar pitch and bore profile derived from bugles, called Althorns, were already in use by the late 1820s. Initially built like a large flugelhorn with a forward-pointing bell, these were common in central and eastern Europe. The Althorn was also built in a circular "Waldhorn" form, and the upright "tuba-form" similar to Sax's saxhorn family. Later, rotary valves were adopted, and the modern instrument's oval upright form was developed by the Austro-Hungarian maker Václav František Červený in the 1870s, based on his Kaiser family of instruments.

During the American Civil War in the 1860s, "over-the-shoulder" (OTS) saxhorns, including an E♭ tenor horn size, were built in large numbers in the United States. These were made for military bands, with the bell pointing backwards over the player's shoulder, so that soldiers marching behind the band could more easily hear the music. After the war, the bands and their music remained popular, and manufacturing demand for bugles and saxhorns remained strong. In New Orleans in the early 20th century, the tenor horn was used in Dixieland jazz bands, including those of Papa Jack Laine.

In mid-19th century Mexico, small brass and wind bands known as bandas became popular in rural and urban areas. Different regions adopted instruments from the military bands of European colonists, and music from German immigrants, particularly along the Pacific coast. By the time of the Mexican Revolution (1910–20), Sinaloan bandas populares (popular bands) had standardized on using the tenor horn in the ensemble, along with trumpets, trombones, and tubas or sousaphones.

In America the tenor horn was called the alto horn, and became colloquially known as the "peck horn" as the player "pecks away at" the off-beats it was often assigned in marches and band arrangements. This name is mentioned in the 1957 Broadway musical, The Music Man. In the 1970s, King produced an instrument called the "altonium", keyed in F with a funnel-like horn mouthpiece. In their 1971 catalog, King produced two models: the 1147 upright model, and 1148 with the bell angled forward. Soon after, these "alto" horns were entirely replaced with bell-forward forms of the mellophone in American marching bands and drum and bugle corps.

== Construction ==
The modern tenor horn, found in British brass bands, is pitched in E♭ and changed little from the mid-19th century French saxhorn ténor. It has an upward-pointing bell and three Périnet piston valves. The bore is moderately conical, like that of the cornet or baritone horn, but not as wide as that of the flugelhorn or euphonium. The conical bore dampens the higher frequency partials to produce a mellow, rounded timbre compared to instruments with a cylindrical bore at the same pitch.

Modern manufacturers, tracking the late 20th century trend of increased bore sizes in band and orchestra brass instruments, build tenor horns with more power and projection than earlier instruments. Manufacturers include Amati, Besson, Eastman Winds, Geneva, Willson, and Yamaha.

In the 20th century, E♭ tenor horns were built as "alto" horns for American bands by many makers, including Olds, King, Conn, and York. Many of these have the bell angled to face forwards, and are sometimes called the altonium after models with that name built by King.

In Central and Eastern Europe, the instrument has rotary valves, and is called the Althorn. It usually has an oval upright form, similar to the larger B♭ Tenorhorn. These are made by Miraphone, Červený, and others.

=== Mouthpiece ===
The tenor horn uses a small mouthpiece, usually with a deep funnel-shaped cup similar to an orchestral horn mouthpiece. The rim diameter, ranging from 18 to 19.5 millimetres (0.71 to 0.77 in), is wider than an orchestral horn mouthpiece, and about halfway between cornet and baritone mouthpieces.

== Performance ==
The standard instrumentation of the British brass band has three tenor horn parts: solo, first, and second. The section usually plays as part of the alto and tenor lines in the middle of the band, with the solo horn part having occasional solo passages. Historically, the tenor horn has gained little recognition as a solo instrument in its own right. This has been gradually improving since the late 20th century. The instrument's timbre, with a relatively soft attack and mellow sound, aids it in its ability to blend into the overall band sound.

=== Range ===
Range of a three-valve E♭ tenor horn

The nominal range of the tenor horn (expressed in concert pitch) is from A_{2} an octave and a minor third below middle C to E♭_{5} an octave and a minor third above middle C, although experienced players can reach higher than this. Since the tenor horn is a whole-bore brass instrument, the fundamental pitches, or pedal tones, are available from E♭_{2} to as low as A_{1} but are seldom called for.

=== Notation ===
Tenor horn parts are written in treble clef as a transposing instrument in E♭ a major sixth above concert pitch. The tenor horn's written middle C (C_{4}) sounds the E♭_{3} below middle C.

=== Players ===
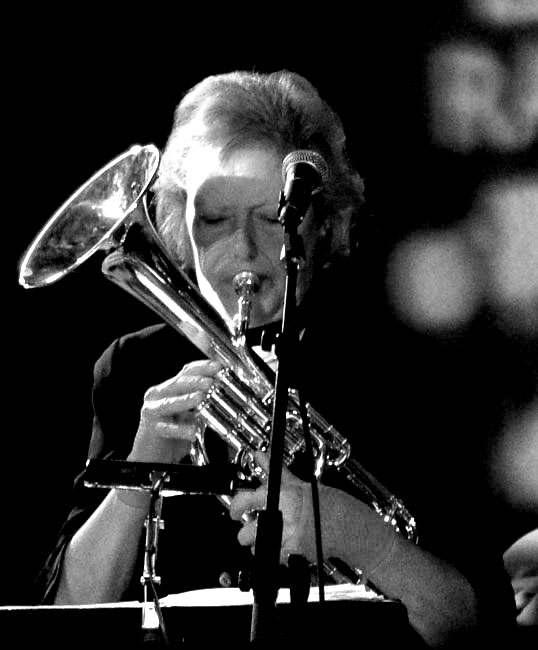
Kate Westbrook playing the tenor horn

The tenor horn as a serious solo instrument was first entertained in the 1970s by Gordon Higginbottom, a horn player with Black Dyke Mills. Brass band composers began writing pieces for him, culminating in his 1978 performance of Eric Ball's September Fantasy in the Royal Albert Hall. In 1996 Sheona White, horn player in the Yorkshire Building Society Band, won the BBC Radio 2 Young Musician Award. She has since made recordings of most of the band solo repertoire, including the tenor horn concerto by Derek Bourgeois, and newly commissioned works in 2023 for tenor horn and string orchestra.

Welsh tenor horn soloist Owen Farr, professor of tenor horn at the Royal Northern College of Music, has tutored several young musicians, including the German hornist Anabel Voigt, who has recorded arrangements, including the Horn Concerto No. 2 by Richard Strauss and new works for tenor horn with piano, strings, and brass band. Flemish tenor horn virtuoso Tim De Maeseneer has commissioned and recorded concertos for tenor horn by Jan van der Roost, Thierry Deleruyelle, and Edward Gregson.

In jazz, tenor horn is sometimes used by trumpeters as a doubling instrument, and was played by Humphrey Lyttelton and Mercer Ellington. British jazz musician and composer Django Bates performs mainly on tenor horn when not playing keyboards. The English singer and painter Kate Westbrook also plays tenor horn, collaborating and recording with her husband Mike Westbrook's various ensembles including The Orckestra (1977–78) and The Village Band since the early 2000s.

== Repertoire ==
The tenor horn has not appeared in the symphony orchestra, where its place is taken by the horn. It is a fixture of brass bands in Britain and the Commonwealth, and sometimes used in concert bands as a horn replacement. The tenor horn is also used in banda music in Mexico and Latin America, where it is called the saxor or charcheta.

In chamber music, the standard quartet in British brass bands is two cornets, tenor horn, and euphonium. In Russia, the brass quartet in the late 19th century was two cornets, tenor horn, and baritone horn, although Russian and Soviet composers after 1890 often substituted a trombone for the lowest part. In Germany, modern posaunenchor ensembles include bugle family instruments—flugelhorn, tenor horn, euphonium—alongside trumpets and trombones. In Scandinavia, an althorn in E♭ (tenor horn) is used in brass ensemble music, such as the Finnish torviseitsikko septet, whose repertoire includes early works by Jean Sibelius.

=== Notable works ===
The first solo piece specifically for a tenor horn was Paul Hindemith's Sonate für Althorn in Es und Klavier (1943), written as part of his endeavour to produce a sonata for every instrument. In the 1970s, pieces appeared as part of Higginbottom's work to popularise the instrument, including Eric Ball's September Fantasy (1977). British composer Philip Sparke has written light solos with band accompaniment, including Masquerade (1985), Aria (2003), and Capricorno (2009). Derek Bourgeois wrote two solo works with piano accompaniment, A Hornting We Will Go (1997) and a sonata (2011).

Concertos for tenor horn have been written since the late 20th century. These include Gareth Wood's Concertino (1989), and concertos by Derek Bourgeois (2003), Elgar Howarth (2004), Idin Samimi Mofakham (Rajaz, 2013), Jan De Maeseneer (Birth of Time Echoes, 2019), Jeffrey Kaufman (Essay, 2023), Jan Van der Roost (2024), Thierry Deleruyelle (Horngold, 2024), and Edward Gregson (Three Gods, 2024).

== Bibliography ==
- Bevan, Clifford (2000). The Tuba Family (2nd ed.). Winchester: Piccolo Press. ISBN 1-872203-30-2. OCLC 993463927. OL 19533420M. Wikidata Q111040769.
- Farr, Ray (2013). The Distin Legacy: The Rise of the Brass Band in 19th-Century Britain. Newcastle upon Tyne: Cambridge Scholars Publishing. ISBN 978-1-4438-4240-2. OCLC 827083144. Wikidata Q136926948.
- Herbert, Trevor; Myers, Arnold; Wallace, John, eds. (2019). The Cambridge Encyclopedia of Brass Instruments. Cambridge University Press. doi:10.1017/9781316841273. ISBN 978-1-316-63185-0. OL 34730943M. Wikidata Q136027509.
- Miller, RJ (2014). Contemporary Orchestration: A Practical Guide to Instruments, Ensembles, and Musicians. New York: Routledge. ISBN 978-0-415-74190-3. Wikidata Q136911157.
- Myers, Arnold (2000). "Instruments and Instrumentation". In Herbert, Trevor (ed.). The British Brass Band: A Musical and Social History. Oxford University Press. ISBN 978-0-19-159012-2. OCLC 51682765. Wikidata Q116480763.
- O'Connor, Michael (2007). "A Short History of the Euphonium and Baritone Horn". In Bone, Lloyd E.; Paull, Eric; Morris, R. Winston (eds.). Guide to the Euphonium Repertoire: The Euphonium Source Book. Bloomington: Indiana University Press. pp. 1–18. ISBN 0-253-34811-0. Wikidata Q135963380.
- Pirtle, Scooter (2002), "The evolution of the bugle", in Vickers, Steve (ed.), A History of Drum & Bugle Corps, vol. 1, Madison: Sights & Sounds, pp. 63–90, OCLC 50171582, Wikidata Q136465477
- Yeo, Douglas (2021). An Illustrated Dictionary for the Modern Trombone, Tuba, and Euphonium Player. Dictionaries for the Modern Musician. Illustrator: Lennie Peterson. Lanham: Rowman & Littlefield. ISBN 978-1-5381-5966-8. LCCN 2021020757. OCLC 1249799159. OL 34132790M. Wikidata Q111040546.
