= Thierry Deleruyelle =

French composer

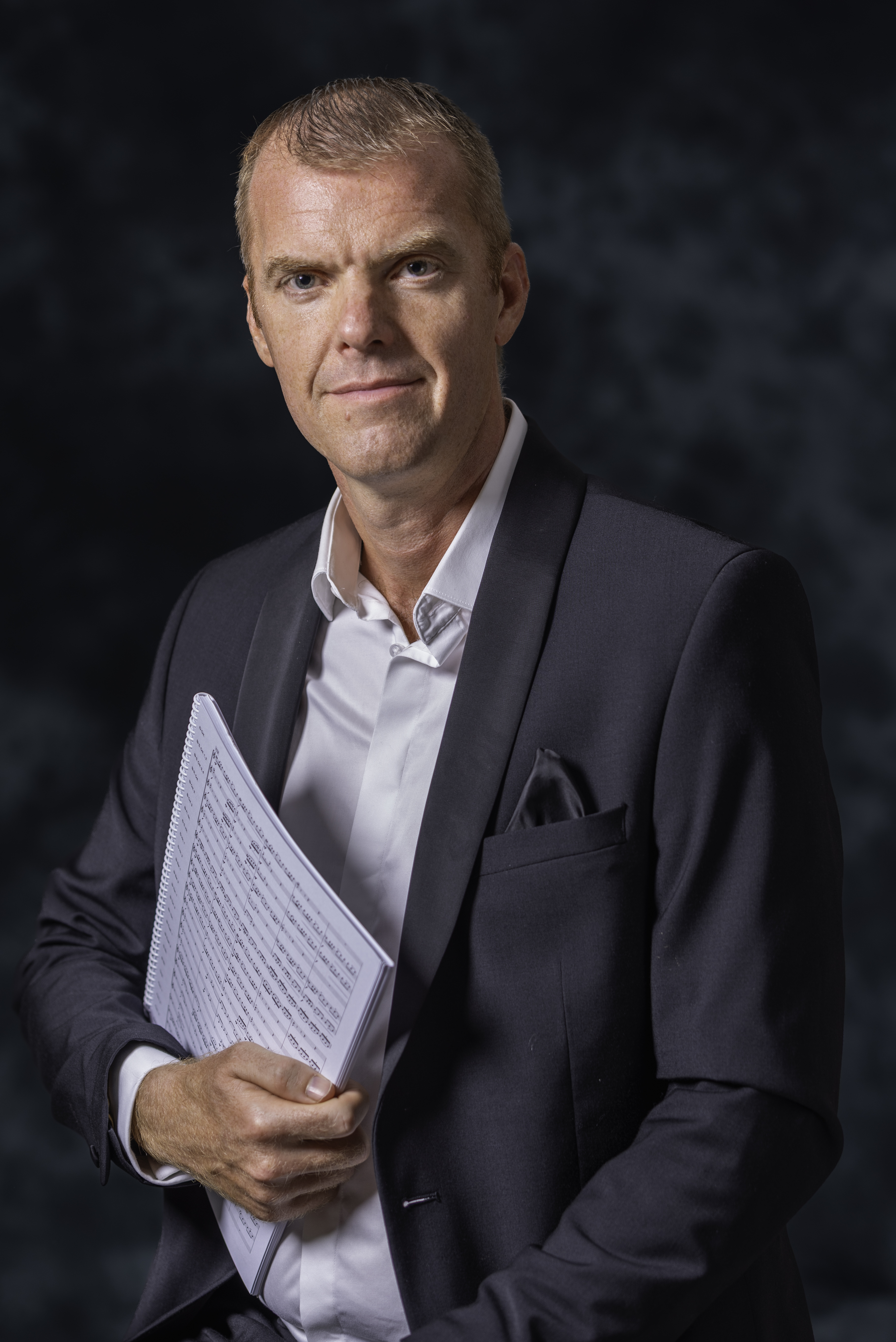
- Thierry Deleruyelle in 2016

Background information
- Born: August 9, 1983 (age 42); Arras
- Origin: France
- Genres: Classical, wind band and brass band music
- Occupations: Composer, conductor
- Label: De Haske Hal Leonard
- Website: www.thierrydeleruyelle.com
- Pronunciation in French

Thierry Deleruyelle (born August 9, 1983, in Arras, Pas-de-Calais, France) is a French composer, conductor and percussionist, known for his work in concert and brass band music. His compositions have been performed internationally by various ensembles. His style is characterised by technical complexity, harmonic richness, and rhythmic dynamism.

== Biography ==
=== Early life and education ===
Deleruyelle was born in Arras, France. He began studying percussion at an early age and participated in regional ensembles during his youth. He later attended the Conservatoire National Supérieur de Musique de Paris, where he studied percussion, harmony, counterpoint, and fugue. During this time, he also performed with several national symphonic orchestras in France as an extra musician.

=== Career ===
Since 2007, his music has been published and distributed exclusively by De Haske Publications, a division of Hal Leonard Corporation.

In 2016, his composition Fraternity was commissioned as the test piece for the European Brass Band Championships, marking the first time a French composer was selected for this role. The piece was subsequently used as the test piece for the British Open in 2017.

His works have been chosen as set pieces for other international brass band competitions, including Sand and Stars for the Dutch National Brass Band Championships and the British Open 2023, as well as Crazy Twenties for the North American Brass Band Championships in 2025. Deleruyelle received the ‘Composer of the Year’ award at the 4barsrest Awards in 2016, 2017, and 2023.

In addition to his contributions to brass band music, Deleruyelle has composed concert band works for major events. On July 14, 2023, his piece Majesty was performed during the opening of the national military parade on the Champs-Élysées, attended by French President Emmanuel Macron. In 2024, his composition Heroes of Liberty won first prize in a prestigious competition organized by the French Ministry of the Armed Forces and was designated as an official national march for the French Army. The piece was also performed during the 8 May 2024 celebrations in Paris, marking the 80th anniversary of the end of the Second World War. In 2026, he received a Buma International Wind Music Award, an international distinction recognizing outstanding contributions to the wind band and bras band repertoire.

== Major Works ==
=== Compositions for concert band ===
- Alliance Day
- Superjet
- The World of Sorcery
- Play for Fun !
- Talisman
- Buffalo Bill
- Chorale for Peace
- Black Gold
- Columbus
- Supernova
- Majesty
- Fraternity
- Lord of the Lake
- Compostela
- Little Tokyo Suite
- Keystone
- Cleopatra
- Eldorado
- Golden Peak
- Mexicana
- Tarjan
- Pop City
- Adventure Land
- Fields of Honour
- The Magic Book
- Sahara
- Children's Oak
- Atlantic Overture
- Merlin
- Statue of Liberty
- High Voltage
- Atlas Symphony
- The Heaven Tree
- Hymn to Freedom
- Colors of Time
- Wind Power
- Emperor
- The Order of the Temple

=== Compositions for brass band ===
- Black Gold
- Superjet
- Chorale for Peace
- Lord of the Lake
- Majesty
- Snow Island
- Crazy Twenties
- Columbus
- Keystone
- Sand and Stars
- Compostela
- Dragonfly, Euphonium concerto
- Crossing Worlds, Cornet concerto
- No Man's Land
- Citadel's Destiny
- Lions of Legends
- Viking Age
- Fraternity

=== Compositions for chamber music and soloist ===
- Horngold, Tenor Horn concerto with piano
- Dragonfly, Euphonium concerto with piano
- Crossing Worlds, Cornet concerto with piano
- Kalaset, for tuba and percussion
- Cadenza infernale, solo timpani
- Balalaïka, solo marimba
- Cyclone, for violin and percussion
- Celero, for percussion quartet
- Face à Face, for vibraphone and piano

=== Distinctive creations ===
- Promethean, Fraternity by Carolina Crown Drum and Bugle Corps (2023)
- Vox Eversio, Fraternity by Santa Clara Vanguard (2019)

== Awards and Recognitions ==
- 2026: Winner of the Buma International Wind Music Awards
- 2025 : Awarded the Gold Medal of the City of Arras in recognition of his international reputation as a composer and conductor.
- 2024 : First Prize Minister of the Armed Forces Composer Contest (France)
- 2023 : Test piece of the Year, 4 Barsrest awards (Sand and Stars)
- 2017 : Test piece of the Year, 4 Barsrest awards (Fraternity)
- 2016 : Test piece of the Year, 4 Barsrest awards (Fraternity)
- 2016 : Newcomer of the year, 4 Barsrest awards
- 2009 : First prize Haize Berriak composition contest (Spain)
- 2005 : First prize Saint-Amand-les-Eaux composition contest (France)
