= King Mortone =

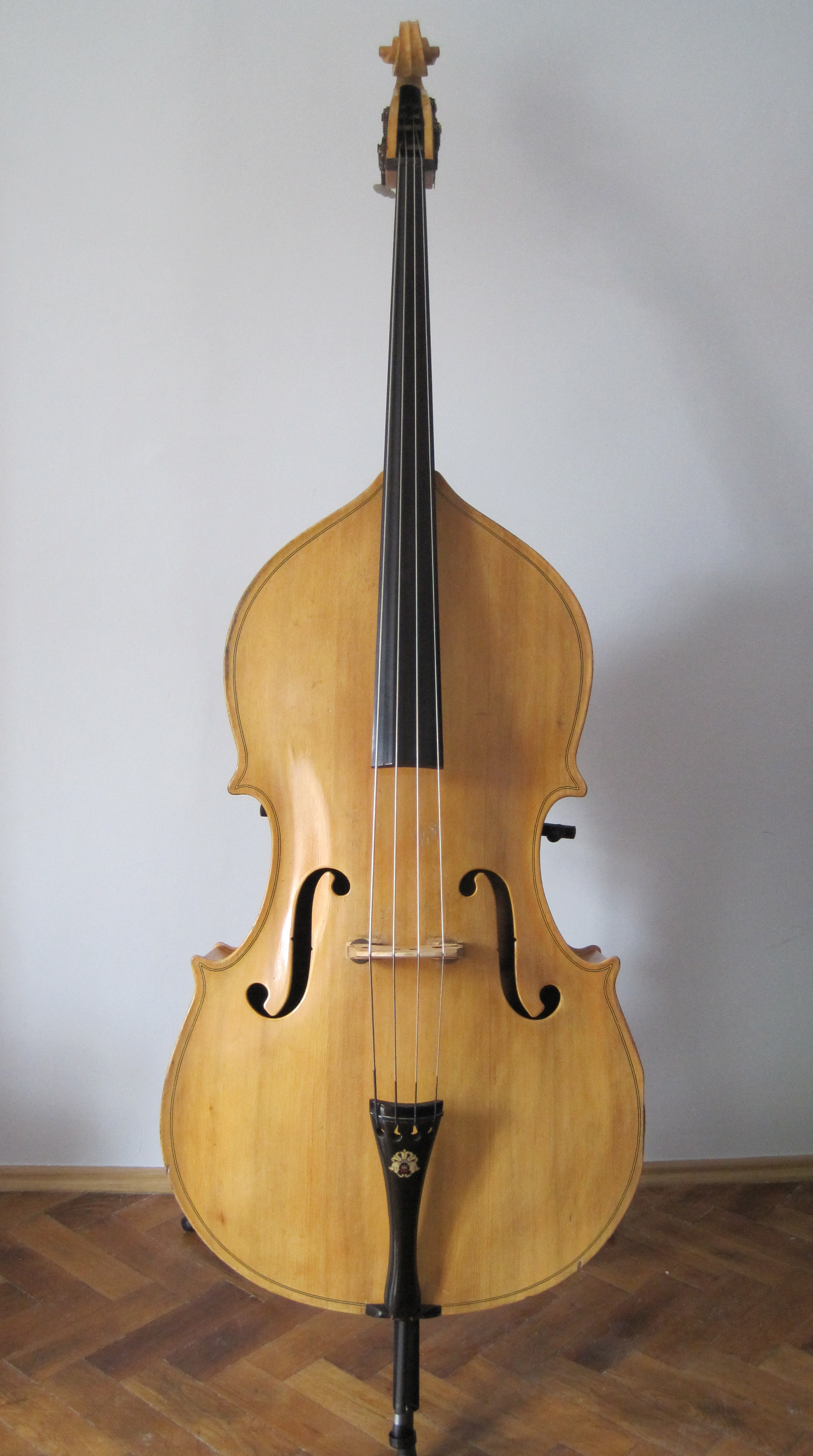
- Manufacturer: H.N. White
- Period: 1934 — 1965

Construction
- Body type: plywood

Woods
- Body: spruce top, maple back and sides.
- Neck: maple
- Fretboard: various dark hardwoods

Colors available
- Sunburst, Blonde

King Mortone is a double bass model made by H. N. White, an instrument-making company founded in America in 1893 by Henderson N. White.

== History ==
The first "King Mortone" double bass appeared in 1934, when H. N. White decided to make a string bass instrument with the same care and attention as was put into making a brass bass instrument. The string bass's fronts were made from the finest straight-grain spruce with very close grain quality, while the rest of the instrument was made of curly maple. Each bass was equipped with an improved geared key mechanism, ensuring rigidity and sensitive tuning. The H. N. White Company claimed that each "King string bass has a greater volume of tone, and carries the vibrations over a longer period of time, than any other string bass ...". During the Second World War production had stopped, but by this point approximately 1200 basses had been made. In 1946 production resumed and continued steadily until 1965, when the string department of H. N. White was sold to Kay Double Basses. By this point approximately 5000 basses had been made. When Kay had control of King Mortone Basses, they stopped production and used the factories to make Kay Double Basses.

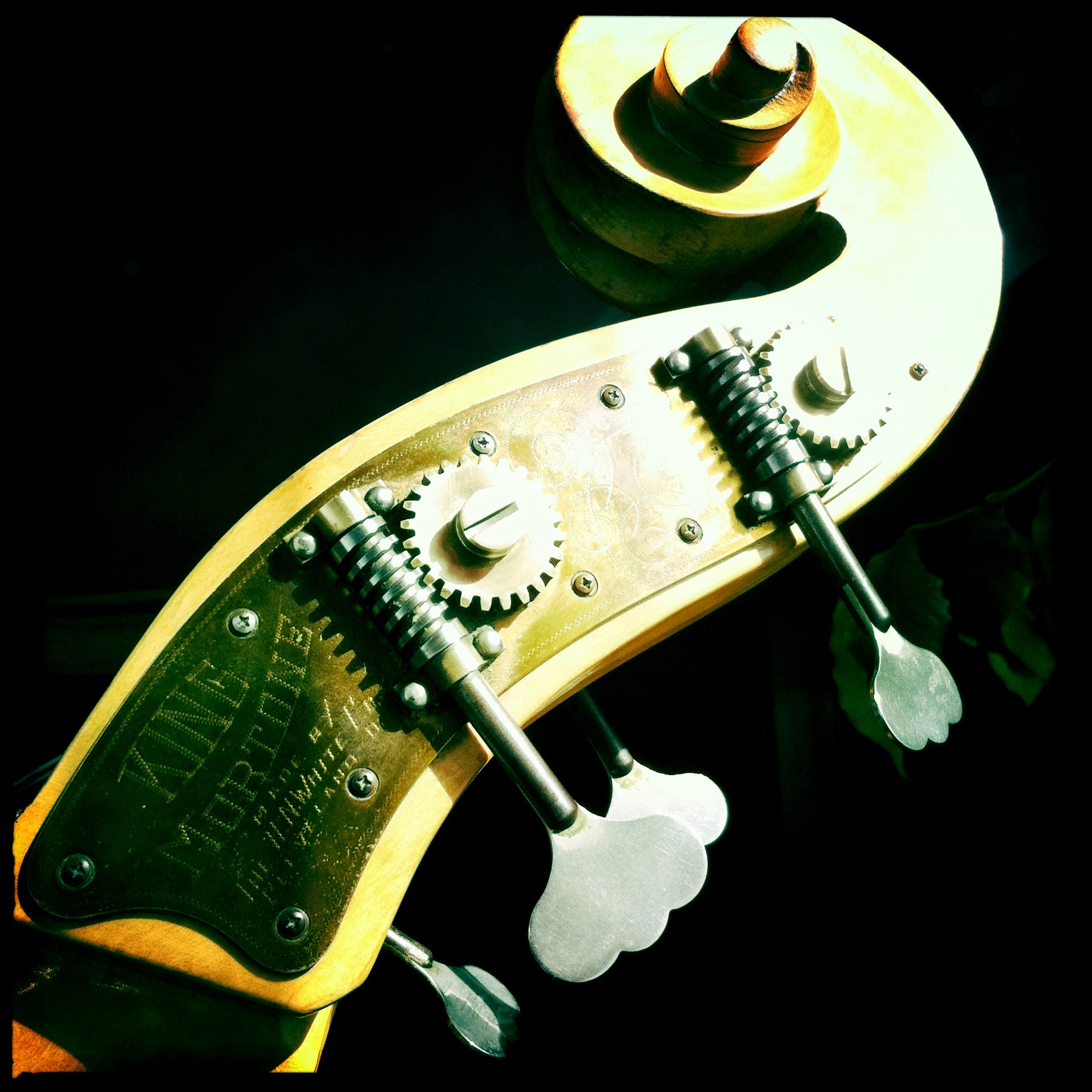
1957 King Mortone Headstock showing the distinctive engraved brass plate tuning machines

As with the American Standard double basses also made by H. N. White, the King Mortone basses had a longer than usual 43 1/2-inch measure (scale length), which was about 1 1/2 inches longer than most 3/4 size double basses. This makes them somewhat more difficult to play for some players, though it is a key component of the characteristic sound of these basses.

"King Mortone" basses are often considered some of the finest double basses for jazz ever to have been made especially for the slap bass style.

== Disambiguation ==
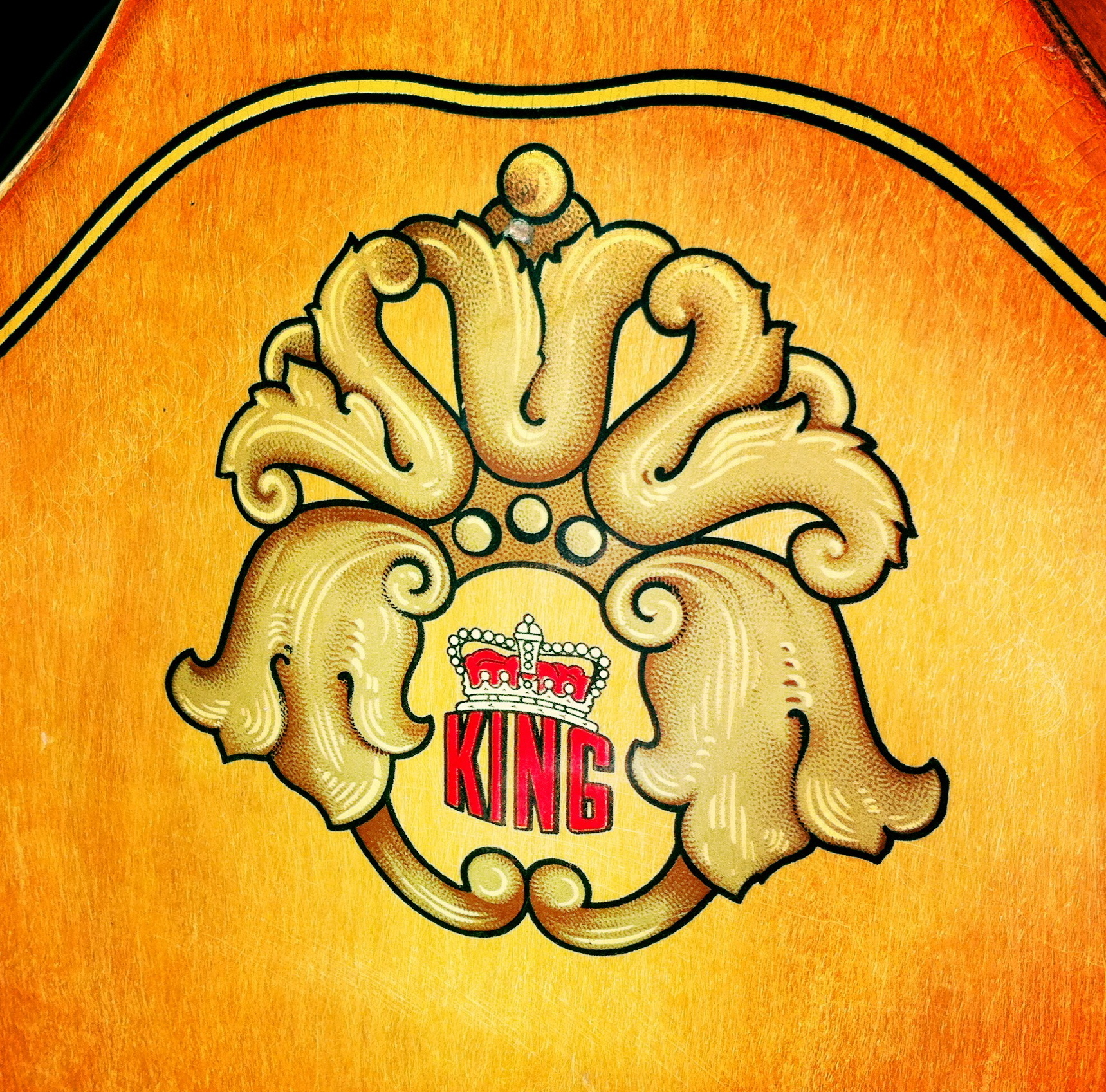
King Mortone logo decal (rear) and false purfling.

The original H. N. White-manufactured King basses are in no way related to the latter-day King Doublebass basses of Huntington Beach, California (KDB). The construction, sizing and finishes all differ significantly, with Mortone basses being on the large size (nearer 7/8 than 3/4) with bulbous shoulders and violin corners, and KDB basses being slim-shouldered with 'Gamba'-type corners. KDB have never made any claims about any connection to the basses produced for the H. N. White Company. Furthermore, as Kay owned the rights to the King Mortone name, it would now be the property of Engelhardt Link, who produce basses to the Kay patterns using the same model designations as Kay under the name Engelhardt. KDB produce basses in the US and in China and are primarily aimed toward the rockabilly and psychobilly markets.

== Models ==
The original "King Mortone" basses were all of the same model, though offered in two finishes: standard sunburst and the less common blonde finish.

== Notable players ==
- Willie Dixon
