= Piston valve =

Fluid control device using linear motion of a piston in a cylinder

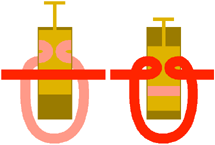
Piston valve in a brass instrument

A piston valve is a device used to control the motion of a fluid or gas along a tube or pipe by means of the linear motion of a piston within a chamber or cylinder.

Examples of piston valves are:

- The valves used in many brass instruments
- The valves used for pneumatic propulsion
- The valves used in many stationary steam engines and steam locomotives

== Brass instruments ==
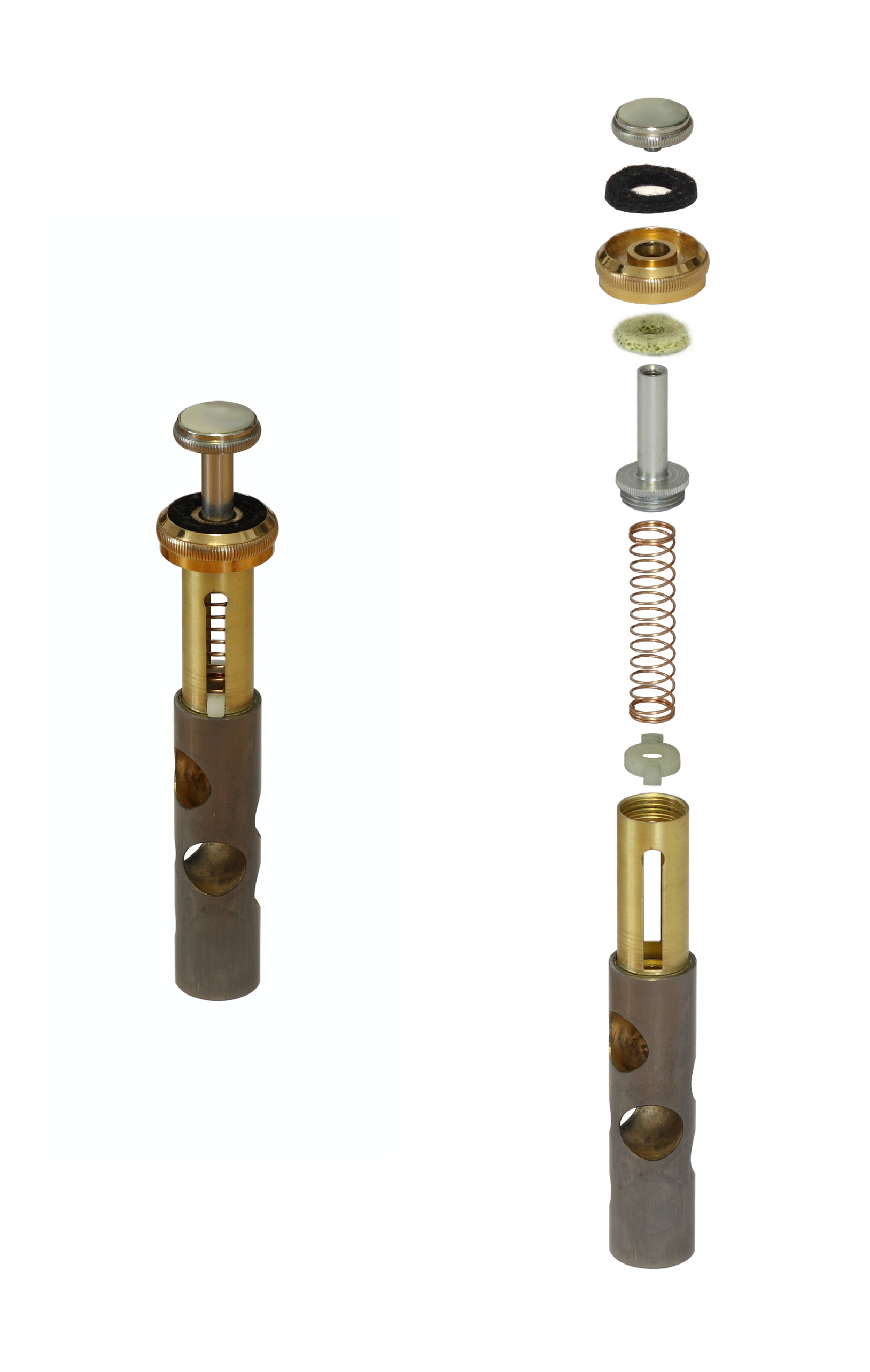
A trumpet's piston valve

Cylindrical piston valves called Périnet valves (after their inventor François Périnet) are used to change the length of tube in the playing of most brass instruments, particularly the trumpet-like members of the family (cornet, flugelhorn, saxhorn, etc.).

Other brass instruments use rotary valves, notably the orchestral horns and many tuba models, but also a number of rotary-valved variants of those brass instruments which more commonly employ piston valves.

The first piston-valved musical instruments were developed just after the start of the 19th century. The Stölzel valve (invented by Heinrich Stölzel in 1814) was an early variety. In the mid 19th century the Vienna valve was an improved design. However most professional musicians preferred rotary valves for quicker, more reliable action, until better designs of piston valves were mass manufactured towards the end of the 19th century.

== Pneumatic cannon ==
A piston valve can also refer to a 2-way 2-position, pilot-operated spool valve. The term is extremely popular among spud gun enthusiasts who often build homemade piston valves for use in pneumatic cannon. Valves are typically constructed primarily from pipe fittings and machined plastics or metals. The inside of a piston valve contains a piston that blocks the output when the valve is pressurized, and a volume of air behind the piston. When the pressure behind the piston is released the piston is pushed back by the force of the pressure from the input. This allows the valve to be opened by a much smaller pilot valve, with speeds faster than possible with just a manually operated valve. Functionally these types of valves are comparable to quick exhaust valves.

This type of piston valve is also sometimes referred to as a back-pressure valve.

== See also ==
- Angle seat piston valve
