= Angle seat piston valve =

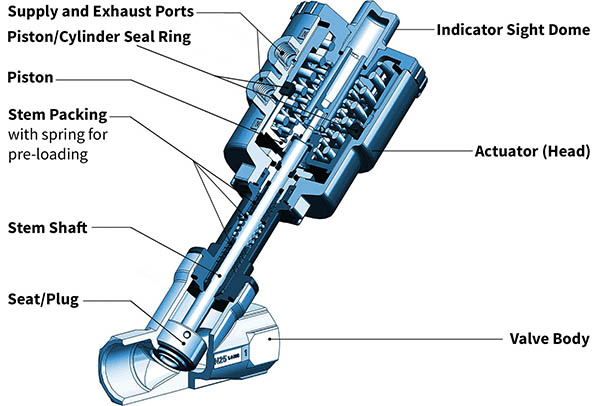
Cutaway diagram of an angle valve

An angle seat piston valve is a pneumatically-controlled valve with a piston actuator providing linear actuation to lift a seal off its seat. The seat is set at an angle to provide the maximum possible flow when unseated. Angle seat piston valves are particularly suited to applications where high temperatures and large flow rates are required, such as steam or water. When used in reverse some models of angle seat piston valve will eliminate water hammer when operated.

== Operation ==
Pneumatic valves are operated by a pilot medium under pressure, usually compressed air but also oil or water.

The valve is equipped with a pneumatic actuator supplied by a three-way solenoid valve. The pressure of the pilot medium enters the actuator cylinder and acts on the piston, which allows the seal to open or to close through the stem. The return of the seal into its rest position is usually achieved by a return spring that can be found in the pneumatic actuator.

In the double-acting configuration, there is no return spring and the pilot medium is used both for opening and for closing the valve.

A red indicator becomes visible through the sight dome that is found on the top of the actuator when the valve is in the open position.

The pressure range depends on the pressure of the pilot medium and the controlled medium and on the direction of the flow, but also on construction parameters of the valve, such as the diameter of the orifice, the diameter of the actuator cylinder and the spring force.

== See also ==
- Piston valve
