= Standel =

American guitar company

The Standel Company is an American company that makes guitar amplifiers. It was founded in 1953 by Robert "Bob" Crooks in Temple City, California. Standel (a portmanteau of standard and electronics) was the name of Crooks' side-business of radio and hi-fi repair, located in his garage at 10661 Freer Street, Temple City, California.

== History ==
=== Origins ===
In 1952, Bob Crooks was approached by inventor-musician Paul Bigsby, who advanced the engineer 75 dollars to build him a custom amplifier to go with the then famous Bigsby solid-bodied electric guitars and pedal steel guitars. It was the first Standel branded amplifier.

When designing the amplifier, Crooks played Les Paul's recording of the song Lover through the amplifier several times as a reference to adjust the sound. However, the final result was inappropriate for amplifying a musical instrument. Paul Bigsby played through the amp with one of his steel guitars and thought it "sounded terrible." Crooks noted the difference between building a guitar amplifier and building a standard hi-fi amplifier. Resultingly, Bigsby loaned Crooks a guitar so he could continue improving the amplifier.

=== Founding ===
Bigsby's involvement in the project lowered. Crooks, however, continued working on his own design. After several months, Crooks came up with what he saw as a satisfactory design. It featured cabinet padded Naugahyde, aluminum guards around the cabinet, a lighted control panel, a JBL D-130 speaker, and independent bass and treble controls. He used his shop's name "Standel" as the amplifier's brand. He called the model the 25L15, because it had 25 watts of power and a Lansing 15-inch speaker. Bigsby eventually purchased a Standel 25L15, #1018 on April 10, 1954.

=== Ascent to popularity ===
Once satisfied with his design, Crooks started attending local concerts to spread the word about his amplifiers and get musicians to test them. The first one of these musicians was the late "Speedy" West. Crooks asked West, a steel guitarist to try out his amplifier at Cliffie Stone's "Hometown Jamboree" show. West liked it, and ordered the first Standel amplifier that night. Crooks then took his amp to the Town Hall Party dance in Compton, California, where Merle Travis and Joe Maphis were playing. They ordered the second and fourth Standel amplifiers.

Standel amplifiers benefited from a rise in popularity among professional musicians, though at a small scale. Due to the high cost of building these amplifiers, they were used mostly by session musicians. Their high prices put them out of reach for most amateur musicians.

By 1963, Standel introduced hybrid amplification and by 1965 developed a full line of all solid-state amplifiers. From 1963 to 1969, Crooks coated the amplifier's modules in color-coded epoxy resin.

=== Downfall ===
In 1970, Standel unknowingly received a batch of defective output transistors that, over time, failed with a burst of direct current that also destroyed the speakers. Following this, Standel began to experience an uptick in warranty repairs.

Eventually, in 1971, the cost to cover warranty repairs became too high for Standel to endure and the company found itself in severe financial trouble. In 1972 Standel Co. was sold to Randall Instruments, Inc., a company founded by Don Randall . Robert C. Crooks retained his former position as president of the company and was also appointed as vice president of engineering at Randall. Robert's son, Robert W. Crooks, was appointed comptroller at Randall while continuing as secretary of treasury at Standel. Don L. Randall became chief executive officer and chairman of the board at Standel Co. For a while Standel practically operated as an independent business entity but the company also worked in close affiliations with Randall and produced Randall's first amplifiers, which were "hybrid" designs with solid-state preamplifier and tube power amplifier (and very much similar to following SG Systems amplifiers). Following briefly in same year, CMI acquired controlling interest in the company.

For a short while Standel amplifiers were manufactured under the CMI rule. During this period Standel, for instance, experimented with the FET transistor technology. The "potted" modules were also ditched and replaced with "modular" circuit board construction. At the same time range of amplifier models was unified and simplified. C.M.I. Also exploited Standel circuitry in developing the "G-series" of amplifiers, which were sold under Gibson label.

By 1972, the Standel brand was replaced by SG Amplifiers (which reputedly stood for "Standel Gibson") manufactured in the Standel factory at 4918 Santa Anita Ave., El Monte, California, as the SG Systems brand. The SG line consisted of "hybrid" designs for guitar and bass amplification and "all-transistor" amplifiers. The amplifiers were most likely developed using Standel resources in coalition with Randall's head design engineer Gary Sunda. (Both Randall and SG Systems employed similar vacuum tube power amplifier circuitry, solid-state power amplifier design was similar to that employed by Standel and Gibson). Circuit diagrams have designer's initials "J.S.G.", which you can also find from early Randall amplifiers.

After just over a year of operation, the SG line of amplifiers was discontinued. and the old factory closed down.

For the next 25 years, Crooks continued design work for various amplifier companies, such as Barcus-Berry. Crooks, for instance, developed early prototypes of company's "Sonic Maximizer" (although it wasn't originally titled "Sonic Maximizer" at the time) and holds a handful of patents of related techniques to "correct" phase response of speaker systems with alleged lead and lag characteristics (in phase) at inductive and capacitive regions of the reactive load. The "Sonic Maximizer" design is largely based on ideas and concepts proposed by Crooks. The "Sonic Maximizer" circuitry was later also packaged into an integrated circuitry format and subsequently licensed by numerous companies. It is arguably Crooks' most successful design.

=== Reformation of Standel ===
In 1997, after 25 years of abandonment, the Standel Trademark became public domain, and Bob Crooks quickly secured it. Wanting to produce Standel equipment, Crooks came into contact with Danny "Sage" McKinney, the founder of Requisite Audio Engineering and through Franklin Garlock, requested a meeting with McKinney. McKinney, having first met Crooks when he was only 14 years old, saw him as a mentor and looked forward to seeing him again. Shortly after this reunion, Crooks offered McKinney the licensing to build and market Standels, with Crooks as technical advisor. For the next 10 years (1997-'07), they built Standels at the Requisite Audio Engineering shop in Glendale, California, 17 miles from the original Standel factory.

Over the next two years, Crooks's health began to fail and, in 1999, he died at 79 years. Crooks lived to see his original design reintroduced at the 1998 NAMM Show in Anaheim, California, 45 years after its introduction in 1953.

After Crooks's death, McKinney continued to operate the Standel Company under the original licensing agreement, granted by Crooks's widow, Deloris Crooks. In 2005, McKinney became the sole owner of The Standel Company and The Standel Company trademark.

=== Present ===
In 2007, the company was moved to Ventura, California, where they continue to build, to original specification, the Standel 25L15 and variations of the 50L15 and 100L15 models and Acoustic Magnifier versions of all models. They continue to use original (50-year-old) JBL D-130 speakers. Each speaker receives a specially developed surround edge treatment and full re-magnetization before being put into another 50 years of service.

In 2023, Standel was purchased by Owen Duffy, a vintage pickup winder living in Vermont.

== Technical achievements ==
Standel was a pioneer in modern amplifier design; the following are some of the company's achievements.

- First to use JBL speakers in a musical instrument amplifier
- First to use padded upholstery
- First amplifier to have illuminated dials
- First closed-back bass amplifiers
- First piggy back amplifiers
- First amplifier to contain its dials on the front panel
- First hybrid amplifier (used both valve and solid state circuitry)
- First self-powered speaker cabinets
- First to have separate "Bass" and "Treble" dials (most amplifiers only had one "Tone" dial at the time)

== Musical instruments ==
From 1961 to 1967, Standel had a short period as a manufacturer of stringed instruments. Bob Crooks made several attempts to market a Standel guitar. The first attempt resulted in 10 prototypes made by Semi Mosely. Joe Hall built the next line of guitars, a run of Mosrite-inspired double-cutaway guitars and a basses that featured an aluminum casting that housed the pickups, bridge and tailpiece. In 1967 Sam Koontz and The Harptone Manufacturing Co. designed and built a product line of 10 semi-hollow body and arch-top guitars, five acoustic models in six-string and 12-string variants and two basses: a semi-hollow body and the first production acoustic bass.
