= Chicago Musical Instruments =

Defunct manufacturer and distributor

Chicago Musical Instruments Company
- Formerly: Martin Band Instrument of Chicago
- Industry: Musical instruments
- Founded: April 1920; 106 years ago in Chicago, Illinois, United States
- Founder: Maurice H. Berlin
- Defunct: 1988
- Successor: Norlin Corporation
- Subsidiaries: Gibson Guitar Company (1944–1986); Epiphone (1957–1986); Lowrey Organ Company (1955–1984); Cordovox electronic accordions; F. E. Olds; William Lewis & Son Co.; Krauth & Benninghofen; Moog Music (1973–1983); Selmer UK

Chicago Musical Instruments Co. (CMI), later known as Norlin Music, was a manufacturer and distributor of musical instruments, accessories, and equipment, which at times had controlling interests in Gibson Guitars (1944 to 1969), Standel, Lowrey, F. E. Olds & Son (brass instruments), William Lewis & Son Co. (stringed instruments), Krauth & Beninghoften, L.D. Heater Music Company, Epiphone Guitars, Selmer UK, Moog, and other musical instrument brands. In the mid-1970s, the company was the largest manufacturer of musical instruments in the United States.

== History ==
Originally founded by Maurice H. Berlin in April, 1920 as Martin Band Instrument Company of Chicago, the company changed its name to Chicago Musical Instrument Co. three years later.

In 1944, CMI took over controlling interests and marketing of the Gibson Guitar Company, then known as Gibson Inc. CMI expanded Gibson's Kalamazoo, MI, plant at 225 Parsons Street by 15,000 square feet in 1945, and changed the logo on Gibson headstocks in 1947. In 1949 CMI appointed as president of Gibson Ted McCarty, who would lead Gibson until 1966, overseeing many classic Gibson guitar designs, such as the Les Paul, the ES-335, the SG, and others.

Shortly after World War II ended and U.S. restrictions on the manufacture of musical instruments were lifted, CMI acquired brasswind manufacturer F. E. Olds & Son.

In 1955, CMI acquired Lowrey Organ Company.

CMI acquired Epiphone Guitars, a former competitor of Gibson's, in 1957. The Epiphone name brand came to be used largely for marketing budget versions of classic Gibson designs, originally made in the Kalamazoo plant but since the 1970s in Asia.

Guitar effects were produced under the Maestro brand, beginning with the FZ-1 Fuzz-Tone in 1962, and later including the Tom Oberheim-designed RM-1A Ring Modulator and PS-1 Phase Shifter.

In 1964, CMI purchased brass instrument manufacturer F.A. Reynolds Company and merged the F.A. Reynolds and F.E. Olds production lines.

In 1969 Ecuadorian Company Limited (ECL), a Panama-based holding company, acquired a majority of CMI shares, and the two companies merged in July of that year. ECL was renamed Norlin Corporation (a portmanteau of the names Norton Stevens of ECL and Arnold Berlin of CMI; Stevens and Berlin were friends and classmates at the Harvard Business School).

In 1973, Norlin purchased Moog Music. That year, with annual sales of more than $120 million, Norlin was the largest seller of musical instruments in the US, with the Norlin Music division accounting for more than two-thirds of Norlin Corporation's total sales at the time.

In January 1984, Norlin became the target of a hostile takeover, and sold off Lowrey Organ in October of that year, followed by Gibson in early 1986.

== See also ==
- Gibson Kalamazoo Electric Guitar
