= Carl Fischer Music =

Sheet music publisher

- Founded: 1872; 153 years ago
- Founder: Carl Fischer
- Country of origin: United States
- Headquarters location: 48 Wall Street, 28th Floor, New York City, New York, 10043
- Publication types: Sheet music
- Official website: www.carlfischer.com

Carl Fischer Music is an American sheet music publisher. It was founded in 1872 in the East Village neighborhood of New York City as a musical instrument repair shop. Except for a brief period in the early 1930s, it has always been the family-owned business of the Fischer-Connor family. They publish both performance and educational music for students, teachers, and virtuosos.

== History ==
=== 1870s into the 20th century ===
In 1872, Carl Fischer opened his musical instrument repair shop in the East Village neighborhood of New York City. Later Fischer began creating and reproducing arrangements, which led him into the music publishing business.

Carl Fischer was also a musical instrument dealer; from the 1890s to 1914 he imported wooden flutes made by Emil Rittershausen (Berlin, Germany). During this early period, Carl Fisher was also the sole U.S. agent for Besson instruments but also imported stenciled brass instruments from Courtois, Alexander, and Bohland & Fuchs. In 1910, Fischer won the importation rights for woodwinds manufactured by Buffet-Crampon of France. In 1929, the C.G. Conn Ltd. corporation acquired the musical instrument department from the company, maintaining the Carl Fischer retail operations as a consortium between Conn and the music publisher under the Carl Fischer name. Instruments from various manufacturers of the period were sold under the Carl Fischer House brand.

=== 1930s and 1940s ===
Walter S. Fischer succeeded his father as President of Carl Fischer Music in 1923.

In 1930, National Broadcast Company (NBC) bought Leo Feist, Inc., the largest music publisher of the time, and Carl Fischer, Inc. They operated semi-autonomously within a NBC-owned holding company, Radio Music Company.

In 1932, the Fischer and Feist families bought back their interests from NBC, taking the two companies private again.

Connor became the president of the company and opened Carl Fischer's second retail location, which also housed a concert hall at 165 West 57th Street in midtown Manhattan. In 1940, the company acquired the York Band Instrument Company. Production at the York facility was switched over to munitions during World War II, after which the York brand subsequently down-scaled their production to budget lines of instruments provided by various suppliers.

=== 2000s–2010s ===
In 2011, former TMEA president and active educator Denise Eaton joined the editorial team as choral editor. Carl Fischer Music is under the leadership of CEO Sonya Kim.
