= F. E. Olds =

American band instrument manufacturer

F. E. Olds was a manufacturer of musical instruments founded by Frank Ellsworth Olds in Fullerton, California, in the early 1900s. The company made brass instruments, especially trombones, cornets, and trumpets.

By the late-1960s or early-1970s, although still producing some professional-level instruments, the company had become better known for mass-produced student instruments. Construction quality declined as production quotas were emphasized. That, plus competition from other companies and cutbacks in school music budgets, led to the firm going out of business in 1979. The Olds and Reynolds names (Olds merged with F. A. Reynolds in 1964) have since been bought and revived in 1983 by a new company under the name "F. E. Olds and Sons", based in Mountainside, New Jersey.

== History ==
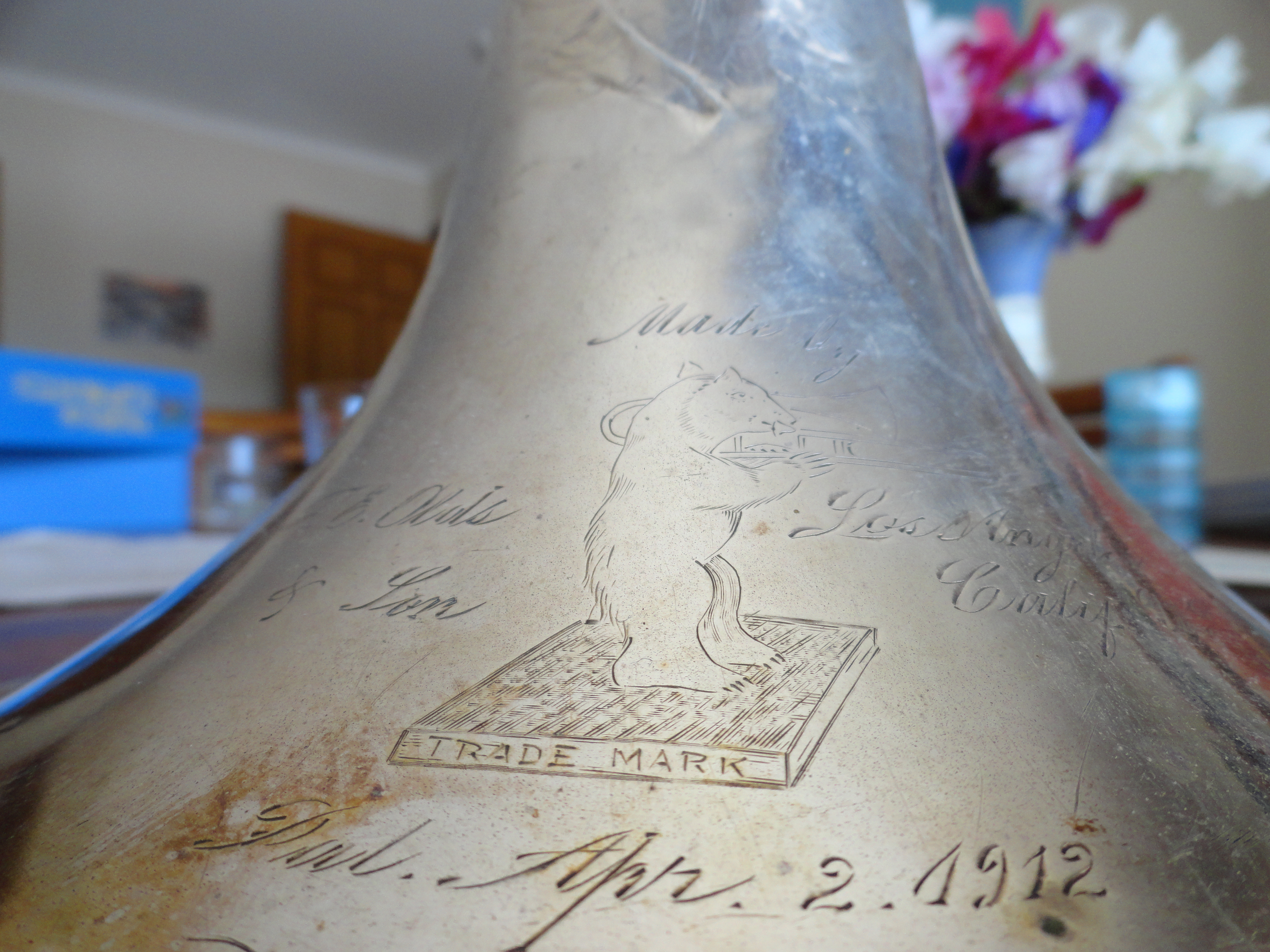
The bell of an F. E. Olds trombone, c. 1927, with the trademark "Golden Bear" and date of the 1912 patent

Frank Ellsworth Olds was born in Medina, New York, in 1861. He was named for the Civil War hero Elmer E. Ellsworth of the Ellsworth Zouaves. While a child, his family moved to Toledo, Ohio. After finishing high school, Olds moved to Elkhart, Indiana, to work for C. G. Conn, and learned the brass instrument making business. In 1885, he moved to Los Angeles, California. An amateur trombone player and entrepreneur, he first set up a shop to build bicycles, which was the only one in Los Angeles at the time. By 1886, he had established the first electroplating shop in Southern California, doing silver plating with H. T. Hazard, establishing the Los Angeles Tool Works by 1887. 1886 also marked the arrival in Los Angeles of Olds's future bride, Helen Daisy Birdsall. In 1901, he was a machinist with the Locomobile Company of the Pacific, branching out from bicycles to automobiles.

Meanwhile, experimenting with trombone design, he was repairing band instruments full-time by 1910. This early work was done in a small workshop behind his house, which was just south of downtown Los Angeles. It was likely around this time that he first offered his new trombones for sale. Implementing new ideas patented in 1912 (some of which are incorporated in contemporary trombones), Olds started producing quality trombones on a small scale. From the earliest years, he was offering a variety of bore sizes (.485″ and dual bores from .494″/.509″ to .509″/.535″) and bell diameters from 6″ to 9 ½″. Model designations were "Solo", "Small Medium", "Medium", "Large Medium", "Large", and "Symphony", which did not indicate a particular bore and bell combination, but a relative size. Most Olds trombones were made to order at this time. These new trombones apparently met with success quickly, and with the help of Earl Strickler and Earl Williams, Olds expanded production to around 200 a year and moved into a large facility by the early 1920s.

Reginald Birdsall (R. B.) Olds (b. September 11, 1899) came to work with his father in 1920, having served in the U.S. Navy during World War I. With R. B.'s enthusiasm, Olds published their first catalog in 1925 and introduced new models shortly after. It was about 1924 that Olds started making mouthpieces with an ivory rim and cup, and the trademark "Golden Bear" playing the trombone was first engraved on the bells. R. B. was most likely responsible for using the slogan "It's a Bear" and otherwise modernizing the image of the company and its products. Also, during these years, they worked on trumpet designs, finally tooling up for their production by 1928.

On October 9, 1928, F. E. was traveling with his wife and other prominent Californians on the SS City of Los Angeles (later commissioned as USS George F. Elliott) to South America. He died suddenly and unexpectedly, suffering a heart attack, and was buried at sea. His new trumpets were not offered for sale until after his death.

R. B. introduced cornets soon afterward. The "Super" Olds line of trombones, trumpets, and cornets was introduced around 1932. Other models introduced in the 1930s included the "Special", "Military", "Symphony", and "French" models. All but the "Super" models could be ordered with a distinctive hammered finish on the bell. This was the standard finish for the "Military" line. The "Super" bass trombone was offered with two valves, both actuated by levers. This is likely the first production bass trombone with two valve levers. There were also some French horns made in the late 1930s, although they didn't appear in the catalogs at that time. The "Recording" model trumpet and cornet were probably designed shortly before the war halted production. During World War II, the government had Olds produce saxophones along with the more standard strategic production. Today, these are very rare as they were not generally available to the public, and a large number of them went down with a supply ship in the Mediterranean. By 1941, Olds held at least six patents for trumpet and trombone designs.

Shortly after World War II ended and brass instrument manufacturing restrictions were lifted, Chicago Musical Instruments (CMI) purchased F. E. Olds & Son.

One of CMI's initial operating decisions was to begin producing a full line of background and low brass instruments in addition to the trumpet, cornet, and trombone models that Olds was already making and had built its reputation on. However, the Olds plant in Los Angeles was not set up for manufacturing the additional brass lines and CMI had difficulty finding a partner who would provide these instruments to Olds without also producing the more profitable small brass and trombones. Instead, CMI's president, Maurice Berlin, coaxed Foster Reynolds, a former apprentice at J. W. York, 30 year veteran of the H. N. White company, and founder of the F. A. Reynolds Company, out of retirement and sent him to Los Angeles with a directive to tool up the factory and begin manufacturing the full line of brasses.

Reynolds was regarded as one of the top brass instrument designers in the country and was responsible for the introduction of many of the finest Olds trumpets and cornets.

In the late-1940s, in a meeting between Reynolds, Reg Olds, and Berlin, it was decided to pursue the student musician market for which great projections had been made. Among his first design actions were the renowned "Ambassador" models of trumpet, cornet, and trombone in 1948. In fact, the trumpet was designed in tandem with the "Mendez" professional model. Because Olds management was concerned about the possible effects of a low-priced model on the company's reputation, Reynolds insisted the horn be built to the same quality and tolerances of the rest of the line, only with less-expensive bracing and other features. According to R. Dale Olsen, who was R&D director at Olds in the 1960s, the company was a "one tolerance shop", meaning that all brass instruments were crafted to the same close tolerances, regardless of price or market niche.

Built on the same bell mandrels as the premium "Recording" models and featuring extremely reliable valve sections, the "Ambassador" line was intended to reflect Reynolds's professional commitment to providing high-quality, dependable horns at an affordable price. The "Brilliant Bell" of the 1948/49 "Studio" line (trumpet, cornet, trombone) points to either collaboration or competition with Reynold's former company in Cleveland, Ohio, who had launched an identical nickel silver bell flare on the "Emperor" ("Silver Flare") and "Roth" ("Tone Tempered") lines in 1947.

Another accomplishment to Reynolds's credit was his signing of the trumpeter Rafael Méndez in the late 1940s to be an Olds clinician and endorser. He worked closely with Méndez to create the artist's signature model trumpet and long cornet. Reynolds began by measuring the F. Besson Meha trumpet that Mendez was so fond of and then evolving the design. (Actually, the measuring was reportedly done by his brother, Harper. The leadpipe, for example, was very different from anything Olds had produced.) These were professional trumpets accepted as equal to or better than what was currently on the market. The Méndez trumpet was used and endorsed by the likes of David Jandorf and Clyde McCoy.

The large bore (.468″) "Opera" trumpet and cornet models followed several years later. Rafael Méndez's name and the use of the "Recording" and "Super" models by other professionals is credited with enhancing the image and sales of Olds instruments.

In 1952, Reynolds, as the plant supervisor, brought Don Agard to Olds from F. A. Reynolds Company. One of Agard's first projects was managing the move in 1954 from Olds's long-time factory in Los Angeles to larger facilities in Fullerton, California.

In 1953, the company was joined by a young Zigmant Kanstul. Starting out at Olds as a French horn assembler, Kanstul apprenticed in the art of brass instrument making from Reynolds.

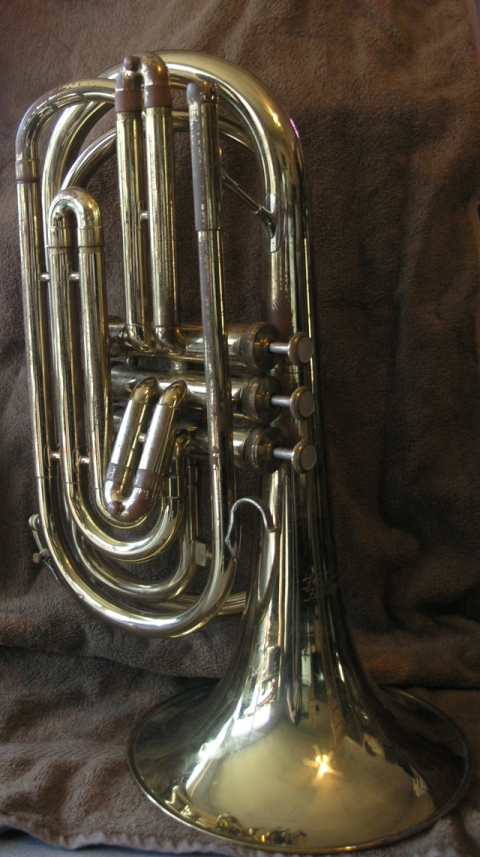
A 1979 F. E. Olds "Flugabone", a specialized redesigned marching trombone with compact, flugelhorn-style valves

Reynolds died of a heart attack on July 18, 1960, while at work at the Fullerton plant. After his death, Agard took over plant operations while Kanstul became factory superintendent. Reynold's brother, Harper, who was shop superintendent and who helped launch the "Ambassador" instruments, retired. R. Dale Olsen was brought in as director of research with a directive to create a line of upper-register trumpets. He succeeded in designing the C, D, and E-flat trumpets and subsequently the "Custom-Crafted" series of B-flat trumpets that featured one-piece hand-hammered bells.

By the 1960s, Olds was producing trumpets, cornets, slide and valve trombones, alto horns, mellophones, French horns, euphoniums, tubas, and sousaphones. They also supplied imported woodwind instruments in the "Ambassador" line. Olds was the second U.S. maker to have produced over one million brass instruments. Increases in volume were accompanied by a lessening in quality, however.

In 1964, CMI (F. E. Olds & Son's parent company) purchased F. A. Reynolds Co. and merged the Olds and Reynolds production lines.

By the mid-1970s, with CMI's successor Norlin Corporation in control, there was a perceived decrease in the quality of construction that made Olds famous. The name became closely associated with the student models and less with the professional models. A buyer for the firm was sought beginning in 1978, but Norlin could not sell the Olds factory for its asking price. The decision was made to close the Fullerton plant and the machinery, tools, and parts inventory were auctioned off.

Kanstul remained at Olds until the early-1970s when he left to become manager of the nearby Benge plant and eventually his own company, Kanstul Musical Instruments. Agard ran operations at Olds until the company finally closed its doors in 1979.

== See also ==
- F. A. Reynolds
