= François Périnet =

Étienne-François Périnet (known professionally as François Périnet; 30 May 1805, Megève – 21 September 1861) was a French instrument maker, best known for his development of an early piston valve system for brass instruments.

== Work ==
Périnet was originally from Savoy. He apprenticed with instrument builder Auguste Raoux, where Périnet took an interest in the new valved brass instruments being produced in Germany, based on the invention of valved horns by Heinrich Stölzel and Friedrich Blühmel. In 1829, Périnet designed a new model of the cornet, adding a third valve and allowing it to play a full range of notes. In the same year, he left Raoux and started his own business.

In 1838, he patented the system of valves with staggered openings which became known as the "Périnet system"; this is the basis for the system still used for most trumpets and brass instruments today.

Competition with other manufacturers (notably Adolphe Sax, who held a monopoly on the supply of instruments to the military and numerous theatres, forced Périnet to sell his business in 1857. At this point, he changed his focus away from valved instruments to building natural horns. He reopened the business as François Périnet, Pettex-Muffat & Cie in 1859. The company Périnet still exists today, manufacturing hunting horns, although Périnet himself had left by the early 1860s and it is unclear where or when he died.
