= King Musical Instruments =

American manufacturer of musical instruments

King
- Formerly: H. N. White Company (1893–1965); King Musical Instruments (1965–80)
- Company type: Privately held company (1893–1965); Subsidiary (1965–2000); Brand (2003–present)
- Industry: Musical instruments
- Founded: 1893; 133 years ago
- Founder: Henderson White
- Fate: Company defunct, currently a brand of Conn-Selmer
- Headquarters: Cleveland, Ohio, United States
- Products: Trumpets; trombones; tubas; marching brasses; saxophones; clarinets; string instruments
- Owner: Conn-Selmer
- Parent: Seeburg Corporation (1965–80); C. G. Conn (1983–85); United Musical Instruments (1985–2000); Steinway Musical Instruments (2000–03)
- Website: www.hnwhite.com

King Musical Instruments (originally founded as the H. N. White Company) is a former musical instrument manufacturing company located in Cleveland, Ohio, United States, that used the trade name King for its instruments. In 1965, the company was acquired by the Seeburg Corporation of Eastlake, Ohio, and the name changed to "King Musical Instruments".

After four changes of ownership for King Musical Instruments since 1980, the rights to the "King" name are currently owned by Conn-Selmer, Inc., a subsidiary of Steinway Musical Instruments, who use it as a brand for brass instruments, including trumpets, trombones, tubas, and marching brasses.

== History ==
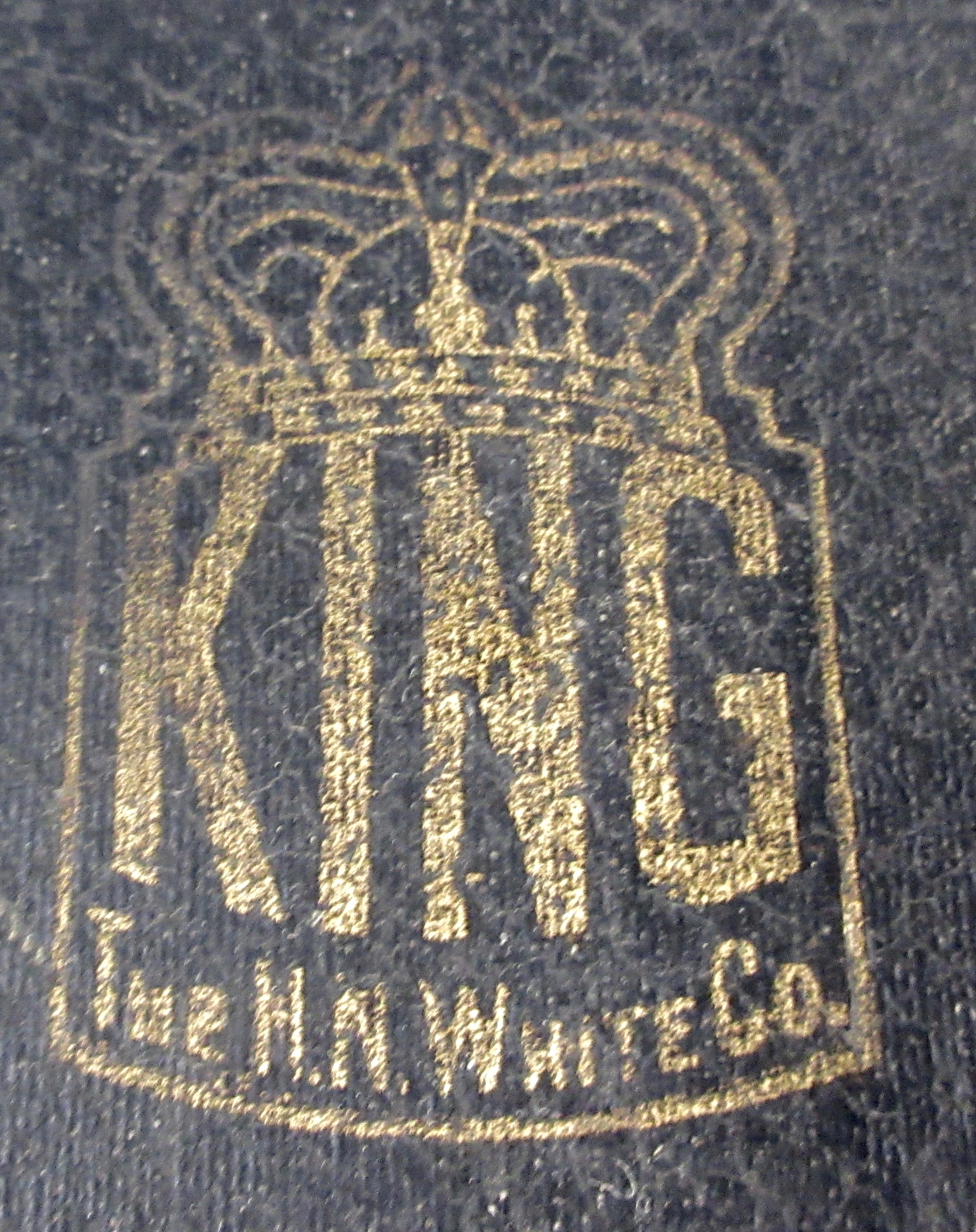
"King / The H. N. White Co." logo on an instrument case

The company was founded as the "H. N. White Company" in 1893 by Henderson White, an engraver and instrument repairman. White designed a trombone for Thomas King, a local player. It became the company's first successful model when it was adopted by Al Pinard, then a famous trombonist. White later designed other brass instrument models, including cornets and baritones. In 1903, The H. N. White company hired Foster A. Reynolds, a talented brass instrument maker at J. W. York & Sons. He worked with White to further develop instruments. H. N. White sought to expand its offerings to woodwinds starting in 1908, importing Evette & Schaeffer saxophones and clarinets manufactured by Buffet Crampon of France. After the import rights for Buffet products were lost to Carl Fischer of New York in 1910, White began importing woodwinds from the V. Kohlert Company, then located in the Czech province of the Austro-Hungarian Empire.

The First World War interrupted the trade of the Czech instruments, so White sought a domestic supplier in the Cleveland Musical Instrument Company in 1916. Many of the earliest saxophones supplied by Cleveland Musical Instruments were made for military bands, as the United States entered the war. H. N. White built a plant to manufacture orchestral woodwinds in 1917. Subsequently, the "Cleveland" and "American Standard" brands were used for less expensive instruments marketed to schools and marching bands, while the "King" brand was reserved for professional grade instruments. In 1925, H. N. White acquired the Cleveland Musical Instrument Company.

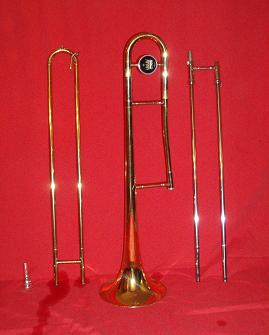
A disassembled King 606 trombone

In 1935, Foster Reynolds left his position as General Manager of the H. N. White Company and founded the rival F. A. Reynolds company. Reynolds would later design the extremely successful Ambassador line of brasswind instruments for F. E. Olds. The H. N. White Company began producing string instruments in 1935.

Henderson White died in 1940. His brother, Hugh E. White, acted as president, and his widow, Edna White, took over as president in 1941. During World War II, the company received government contracts to assemble radar units and fuses. Edna's daughter, Cathryn White Ludwig, married William F. Ludwig Jr. of the drum-percussion company WFL Drum Company. Cathryn was named the Vice President of H. N. White in 1945, making it one of the few companies in America headed by two women.

H. N. White became a major player in the saxophone market dominated by Buescher, C. G. Conn, and Martin during the interwar years. King saxophones had brazed-on tonehole chimneys, which have significant advantages over both the soldered-on and drawn types used by other manufacturers. Brazing was also a relatively high cost process. The King Saxello was a soprano saxophone with a downward curve near the mouthpiece and a bell curved 90 degrees from the body, for optimal playing position and acoustic qualities. With improvements to saxophone design embodied by the King Zephyr in 1935, H. N. White's position as a leading manufacturer of saxophones was firmly established. In 1937, the Zephyr gained a double-socket neck that eliminated the large collar on the body tube at the neck joint, and the Zephyr Special was introduced as a deluxe version with a changed bore, improved keytouches for the left hand table, and mother of pearl inlay on all keytouches. Sterling silver necks and bells also became available.

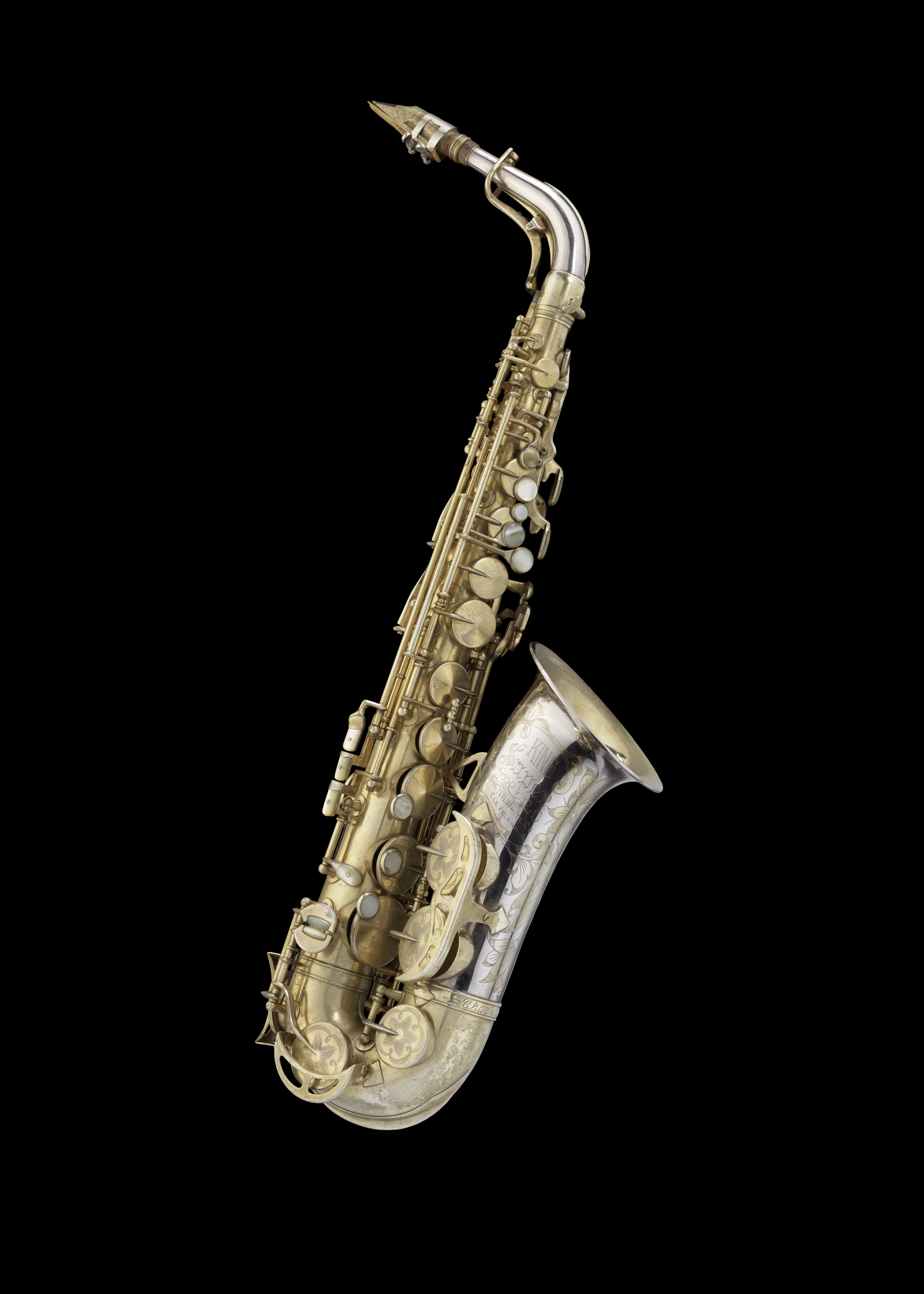
A King Super 20 alto saxophone, owned and played by Charlie Parker, now at the Smithsonian Institution

The King line's run of success continued after World War II, with highly desired lines of woodwind and brass instruments. Several famous musicians were featured playing King instruments, including Tommy Dorsey, Charlie Parker, and Harry James. The Zephyr Special was rebranded the Super 20 in 1945, with a changed lever mechanism for the neck octave key. With improved left hand cluster mechanisms introduced around 1949, the Super 20 represented the zenith of H. N. White's achievements as a saxophone manufacturer. The visually and aurally striking horn was one of the most desired ever. However, new competition from Henri Selmer Paris, aided by the exchange rate between the French franc and the US dollar in the postwar era, put price pressure on the American manufacturers, and H. N. White was no exception. Through the mid-1950s into the 60s, the imperative of cutting costs grew and features were dropped to simplify manufacture. During that same period, the Zephyr was sold as a student-line instrument.

Starting in the early 1960s, King imported saxophones from Strasser-Marigaux-Lemaire (SML) of France, to be sold as the King Marigaux, as the profitability and market niche of their domestically-produced saxophones became increasingly problematic. Some saxophones from the Julius Keilwerth company of West Germany were imported to be sold as the King Tempo. Some saxophones from Amati of Czechoslovakia, and Kohlert, then located in West Germany, were imported to be sold as the King Lemaire.

In 1965 the company was sold to the Seeburg Corporation of Eastlake, Ohio, and the name was changed to "King Musical Instruments", reflecting the long absence of models produced under the "Cleveland" and "American Standard" brands. In 1968, Seeburg moved production to Eastlake and instituted a new round of cost-cutting that effectively ended the era of the Super 20 as a professional-quality saxophone. The Zephyr model saxophone was discontinued during the early 1970s, followed by the Super 20 model in 1975.

In 1972, Seeburg-King acquired the Benge company, which produced a distinctive line of trumpets in Los Angeles, California, shortly thereafter moving production to Anaheim. King was divested of its Anaheim operation in 1983, then used the Benge name for a different model of trumpet produced in Eastlake.

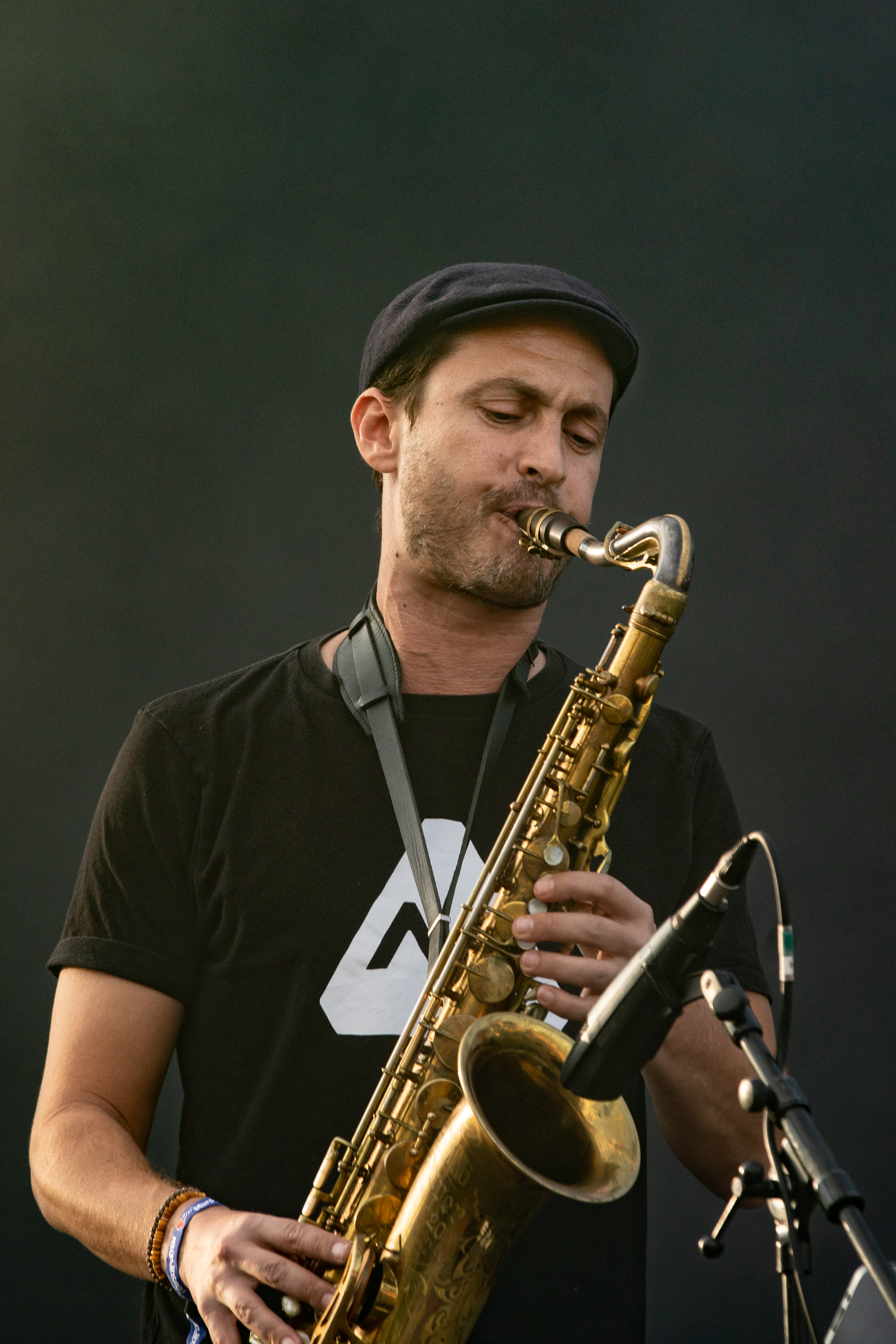
Musician playing a King Super 20 tenor saxophone

King emerged from the 1979 bankruptcy of Seeburg under the ownership of Seeburg's creditors. In 1983, King was sold to Daniel J. Henkin (1930–2012), owner of C. G. Conn. In 1985, Henkin sold his companies to the Swedish investment firm Skåne-Gripen, who placed them under the new parent company "United Musical Instruments" (UMI). UMI revived King's efforts in the student saxophone market, reintroducing the former Cleveland models 613 alto and 615 tenor, as well as assembling some Super 20s from pre-1975 stock. Ownership of UMI passed to Skåne-Gripen partner Bernhard Muskantor in 1990. Muskantor's interest in King was not merely as an investor; he had family roots in the music business and respect for the company's past accomplishments. His ambitions for restoring King's status as a top-tier instrument manufacturer were reflected in the King Super 21 development project that produced between one and two dozen prototype saxophones for professional testing in 1995. A hard-headed view of production costs and the state of the market for high-end saxophones convinced UMI that the project was a no-go, and production was cancelled. Steinway Musical Instruments acquired UMI in 2000. Since 2003, King brand brasswinds are manufactured under Conn-Selmer, Inc., a subsidiary of Steinway. Use of the Benge name for brasswinds was discontinued in 2005, although Benge models continue to be manufactured in Anaheim and marketed under the brand Burbank.
