= James Warren York =

American musical instrument maker (1839–1927)

- Born: November 24, 1839; Exeter, New Hampshire, U.S.
- Died: February 9, 1927 (aged 87); Los Angeles, California, U.S.
- Occupation: Musical instrument maker
- Children: Charles E. York; Frank W. York

James Warren York (November 24, 1839 – February 9, 1927), more commonly known as J. W. York, was an American musician, businessman, business owner, and musical instrument innovator.

== Biography ==
York was born on November 24, 1839, in Exeter, New Hampshire, United States.

York, a cornet player in Grand Rapids, Michigan, theaters, started an instrument repair company in the latter part of the 19th century. Two partnerships, "Smith and York" in 1883 and "York and Holton" in 1885, were reformed into the "J. W. York and Company" instrument manufacturing company in 1884. In 1887, to celebrate the birth of his son Charles E. York, the business was renamed "York & Son". In 1898, the birth of his other son, Frank W. York, prompted him to rename the business "York & Sons". The business went through other name changes ("J. W. York", "J. W. York and Sons", "J. W. York Band Instrument Co", "J.W. York Instrument Co.") before finally settling on "York Band Instrument Company".

In 1917, York retired from the musical instrument manufacturing business and moved to Los Angeles, California. It was here that, on February 9, 1927, he died.
