= York Band Instrument Company =

Former musical instrument manufacturer

- Company type: Private company
- Industry: Musical instruments
- Founded: 1882
- Founder: James Warren York
- Headquarters: Grand Rapids, Michigan
- Area served: United States
- Products: Band instruments
- Number of employees: 300

The York Band Instrument Company was a musical instrument manufacturer in Grand Rapids, Michigan.

== History ==
James Warren York was a former army musician and played professionally in the Grand Rapids, Michigan theaters. He eventually decided to open his own instrument repair business and set up on the ground floor of a Monroe Avenue building in Grand Rapids, Michigan in 1882. The early company originally started from a merger of two partnerships between "Smith and York" in 1883 and "York and Holton" in 1885. Together they were eventually reformed into the "J.W.York and Company". In 1887, Frank York, J.W. York's eldest son joined the business and it was named "York & Son". In 1898, Charles York, the youngest son joined the company which prompted him to again rename the business "York & Sons". The business went through various name changes ("J.W. York", "J.W. York and Sons", "J.W. York Band Instrument Co", "J.W. York Instrument Co.") before finally settling on "York Band Instrument Co".

James Warren York

By 1890, York was operating a successful instrument plant on Canal St. by importing instruments and producing a few original cornets and trombones. Newly designed instruments were added each year and in 1898, the company was manufacturing a complete line of cupped mouthpiece brass instruments. Frank Holton, Henry Martin Jr., Henry Martin Sr., and F.A. Reynolds, pioneers of band instrument manufacturing, were all once employed at the early York factories at 3,5, and 7 North Ionia Avenue in Grand Rapids. The factories were later relocated to the old Raniville Power building at the corner of Campau Ave and Lyon St. In 1908, a plant at 1600 South Division Avenue was built and lasted until it was closed in 1971.

In 1913, rights were sold to original partners James and John Duffy and a stock company was formed. In 1916 J.W. York retired from the company. The company was officially changed to York Band Instrument Company in 1926 when the York family relinquished all control, although the "York Band Instrument Company" name was used in promotional publications starting in the early 1920s after J.W. had retired. The company had various subsidiaries and used the proprietary name "Grand Rapids Band Instrument Company" and "USA Line" for their mass-produced and lower priced student quality horns. Additionally, York produced various stencil horns under the names of "Hallmark", "Acme", "Wolverine", and "Pioneer".

== The "York" Sound ==
The York Band Instrument Co manufactured a full line of woodwind, string, percussion, and brass instruments which included trumpets, cornets, horns, trombones, helicons, baritone horns, sousaphones, and tubas. The brass instruments made before 1940 were known to have superior craftsmanship, ease of enunciation, intonation, and timbre, and were widely sought after by concert, brass, and military bands. Many brass York instruments are still presently used, possessing sound qualities that are still prized by brass musicians. The United States Army Quartermaster Corps and the United States Navy historically used York instruments and still maintain them in their possession.

Two legendary York CC tubas were originally commissioned by the Philadelphia Orchestra in the 1930s. The tubas were later sold to Arnold Jacobs and the Chicago Symphony Orchestra at different times and used by subsequent tubists in their orchestra. These tubas have become the arch-prototypes for as many as six modern tuba designs because of their excellent intonation, tone, timbre, and craftsmanship. These tubas are also the basis for the legendary "York tuba sound" that many tubists try to emulate.

== Decline ==
A vintage 1980's photo of the abandoned York Grand Rapids factory site as well as the site today.

After experiencing unparalleled growth through innovation in much of the early 20th century, the York company fell victim to the Great Depression of the 1930s and was purchased by Carl Fischer for $300,000 in December 1940. This purchase relegated York Band Instruments to being a subsidiary of Carl Fischer. During World War II the company switched to the manufacturing of munitions. After the war, York produced student instruments at the Grand Rapids factories. The name York sometimes became a stamp on stencil horns from other manufacturers as Carl Fischer's ownership outsourced work. Higher quality instruments were transferred to the West German company Boehm Meinl as the "York Master" line.

By 1964 the York company was out of business. In 1970, Carl Fischer sold the York brand to the New York-based Tolchin Instruments, Incorporated. Tolchin Instruments closed the original Grand Rapids factory in 1971. After years of mismanagement Tolchin accumulated an unmanageable $24 million debt. The York brand was eventually sold to Boosey & Hawkes in 1976.

== See also ==
- Buescher Band Instrument Company
- C.G. Conn
- Leblanc (musical instrument manufacturer)
- Martin Band Instrument Company
- Steinway Musical Instruments
