= Cornet =

Brass instrument

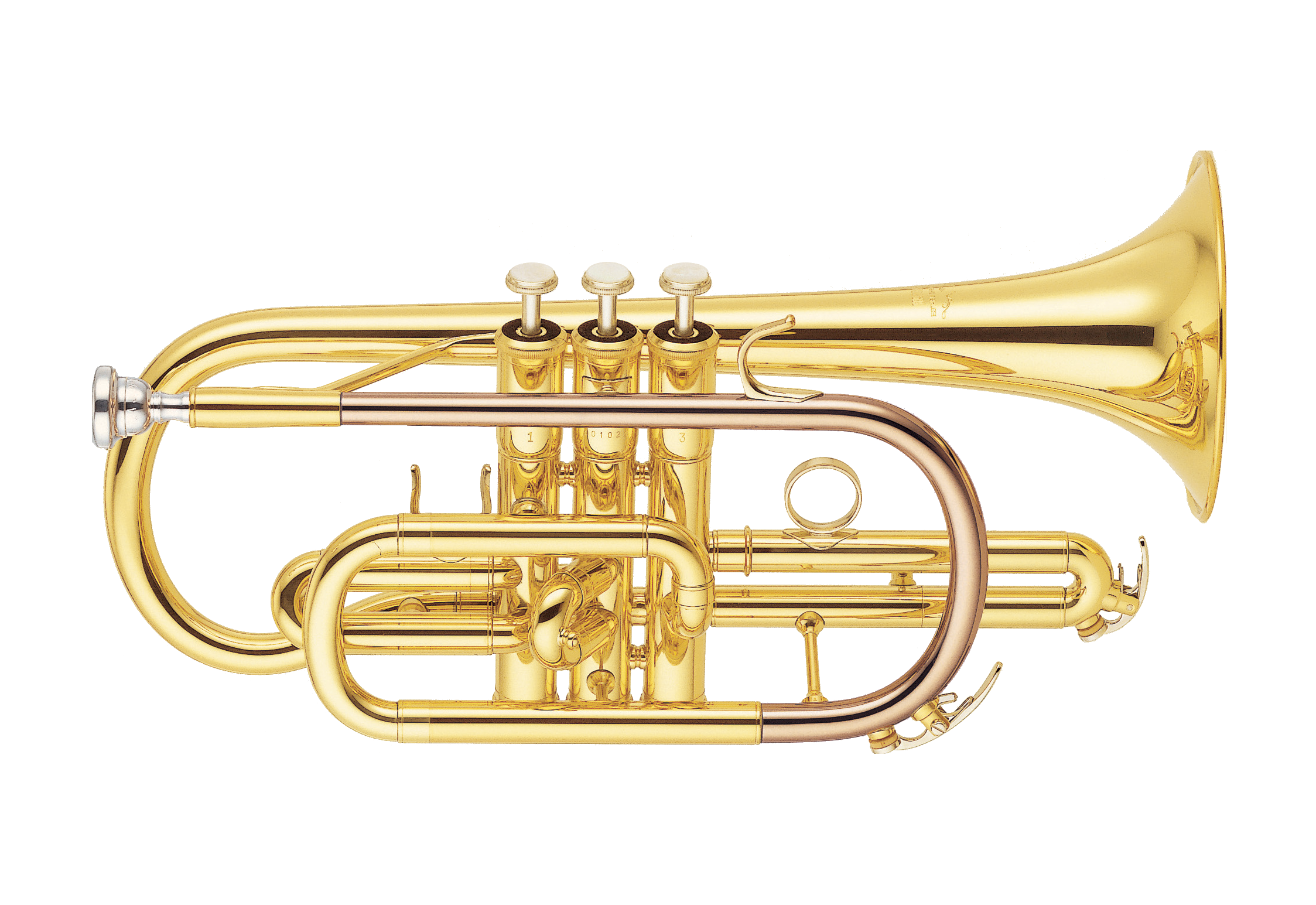
- Cornet in B♭

Brass instrument
- Classification: Wind; brass; aerophone
- Hornbostel–Sachs classification: 423.232 (Valved aerophone sounded by lip vibration)
- Developed: Early 19th century from the post horn

Playing range
- Written range: (lower and higher notes are possible)

Related instruments
- Trumpet; post horn; bugle; flugelhorn; flumpet

The cornet (/ˈkɔːrnɪt/, US: /kɔːrˈnɛt/) is a brass instrument similar to the trumpet but distinguished from it by its conical bore, more compact shape, and mellower tone. The most common cornet is a transposing instrument in B♭. There is also a soprano cornet in E♭ and cornets in A and C. All are unrelated to the Renaissance and early Baroque cornett.

== History ==
The cornet was derived from the posthorn by applying valves to it in the 1820s. Initially using Stölzel valves, by the 1830s, Parisian makers were using the improved Périnet piston valves. Cornets first appeared as separate instrumental parts in 19th-century French compositions.

The instrument could not have been developed without the improvement of piston valves by Silesian horn players Friedrich Blühmel (or Blümel) and Heinrich Stölzel, in the early 19th century. These two instrument makers almost simultaneously invented valves, though it is likely that Blühmel was the inventor, while Stölzel developed a practical instrument. They were jointly granted a patent for a period of ten years. François Périnet received a patent in 1838 for an improved valve, which became the model for modern brass instrument piston valves. The first notable virtuoso player was Jean-Baptiste Arban, who studied the cornet extensively and published La grande méthode complète de cornet à piston et de saxhorn, commonly referred to as the Arban method, in 1864. Up until the early 20th century, the trumpet and cornet co-existed in musical ensembles; symphonic repertoire often involves separate parts for trumpet and cornet. As several instrument builders made improvements to both instruments, they started to look and sound more alike. The modern-day cornet is used in brass bands, concert bands, and in specific orchestral repertoire that requires a more mellow sound.

The name "cornet" derives from the French corne, meaning "horn", itself from Latin cornu. While not musically related, instruments of the Zink family (which includes serpents) are named "cornetto" or "cornett" in modern English, to distinguish them from the valved cornet described here. The 11th edition of the Encyclopædia Britannica referred to serpents as "old wooden cornets". The Roman/Etruscan cornu (or simply "horn") is the lingual ancestor of these. It is a predecessor of the post horn, from which the cornet evolved, and was used like a bugle to signal orders on the battlefield.

== Relationship to trumpet ==
The cornet's valves allowed for melodic playing throughout the instrument's register. Trumpets were slower to adopt the new valve technology, so for 100 years or more, composers often wrote separate parts for trumpet and cornet. The trumpet would play fanfare-like passages, while the cornet played more melodic ones. The modern trumpet has valves that allow it to play the same notes and fingerings as the cornet.

Cornets and trumpets made in a given key (usually the key of B♭) play at the same pitch, and the technique for playing the instruments is nearly identical. However, cornets and trumpets are not entirely interchangeable, as they differ in timbre. Also available, but usually seen only in the brass band, is an E♭ soprano model, pitched a fourth above the standard B♭.

Unlike the trumpet, which has a cylindrical bore up to the bell section, the tubing of the cornet has a mostly conical bore, starting very narrow at the mouthpiece and gradually widening towards the bell. Cornets following the 1913 patent of E. A. Couturier can have a continuously conical bore. This shape is primarily responsible for the instrument's characteristic warm, mellow tone, which can be distinguished from the more penetrating sound of the trumpet. The conical bore of the cornet also makes it more agile than the trumpet when playing fast passages, but correct pitching is often less assured. The cornet is often preferred for young beginners as it is easier to hold, with its centre of gravity much closer to the player.

The cornet mouthpiece has a shorter and narrower shank than that of a trumpet, so it can fit the cornet's smaller mouthpiece receiver. The cup size is often deeper than that of a trumpet mouthpiece.

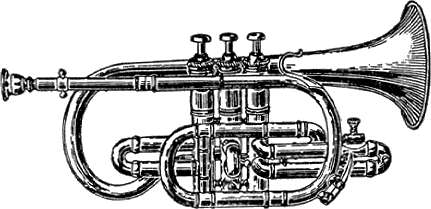
Short-model traditional cornet, also known as a shepherd's crook—shaped model (Webster's Dictionary 1911)

One variety is the short-model traditional cornet, also known as a "Shepherd's Crook" shaped model. These are most often large-bore instruments with a rich mellow sound. There is also a long-model, or "American-wrap" cornet, often with a smaller bore and a brighter sound, which is produced in a variety of different tubing wraps and is closer to a trumpet in appearance. The Shepherd's Crook model is preferred by cornet traditionalists. The long-model cornet is generally used in concert bands in the United States and has found little following in British-style brass and concert bands.

A third, and relatively rare variety—distinct from the "American-wrap" cornet—is the "long cornet", which was produced in the mid-20th century by C. G. Conn and F. E. Olds and is visually nearly indistinguishable from a trumpet, except that it has a receiver fashioned to accept cornet mouthpieces.

=== Echo cornet ===
Echo cornet in B♭ by J. Higham, 1884

The echo cornet has been called an obsolete variant. It has a mute chamber (or echo chamber) mounted to the side, acting as a second bell when the fourth valve is pressed. The second bell has a sound similar to that of a Harmon mute and is typically used to play echo phrases, whereupon the player imitates the sound from the primary bell using the echo chamber.

== Playing technique ==
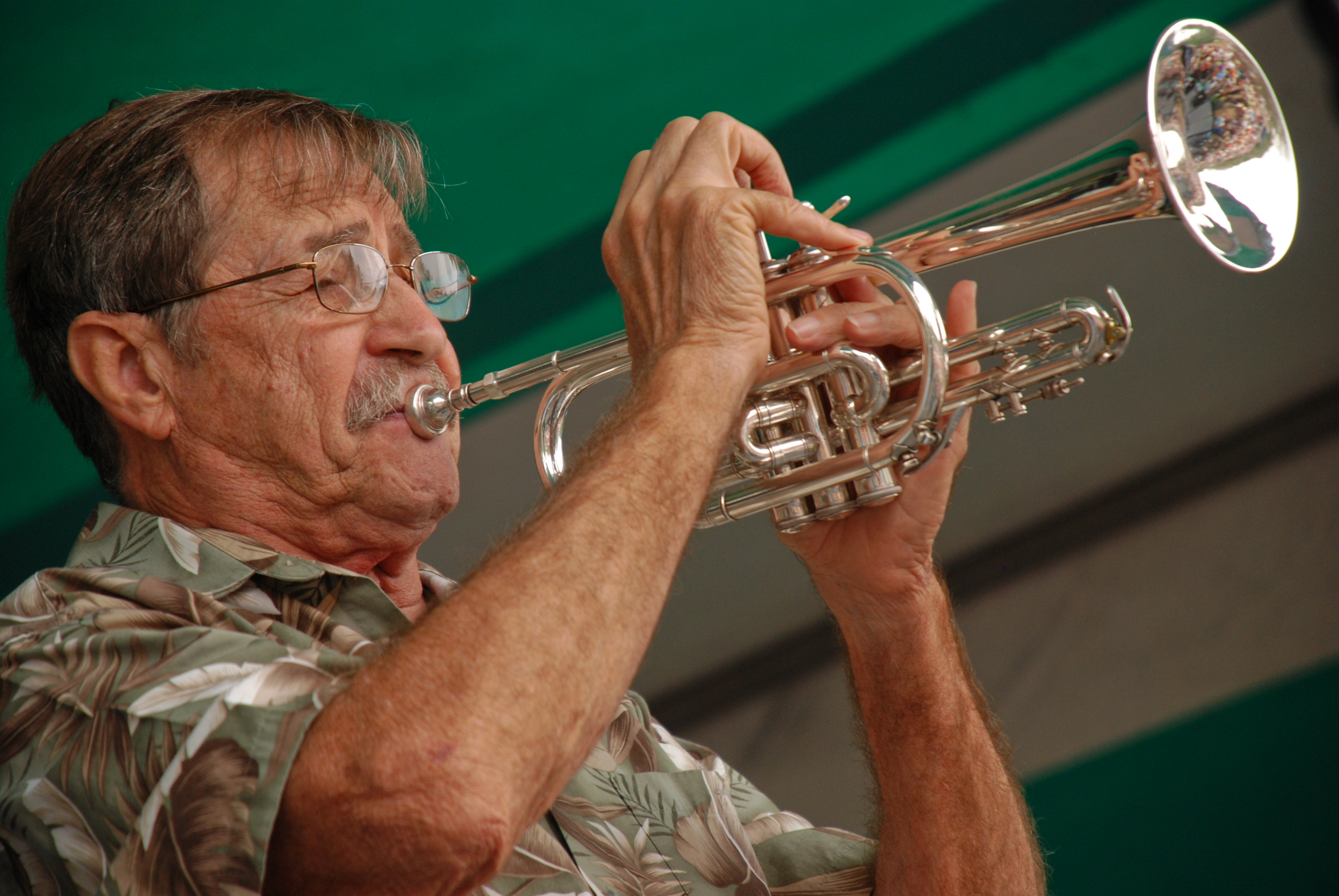
Connie Jones playing a long-model cornet

Like the trumpet and all other modern brass wind instruments, the cornet makes a sound when the player vibrates ("buzzes") the lips in the mouthpiece, creating a vibrating column of air in the tubing. The frequency of the air column's vibration can be modified by changing the lip tension and aperture, or embouchure, and by altering the tongue position to change the shape of the oral cavity, thereby increasing or decreasing the speed of the airstream. In addition, the column of air can be lengthened by engaging one or more valves, thus lowering the pitch. Double and triple tonguing are also possible.

Without valves, the player could produce only a harmonic series of notes, like those played by the bugle and other "natural" brass instruments. These notes are far apart for most of the instrument's range, making diatonic and chromatic playing impossible, except in the extreme high register. The valves change the length of the vibrating column and provide the cornet with the ability to play chromatically.

== Ensembles with cornets ==
=== Brass band ===
British brass bands consist only of brass instruments and a percussion section. The cornet is the leading melodic instrument in this ensemble; trumpets are never used. The ensemble consists of about thirty musicians, including nine B♭ cornets and one E♭ cornet (soprano cornet). In the UK, companies such as Besson and Boosey & Hawkes specialized in instruments for brass bands. In America, 19th-century manufacturers such as Graves and Company, Hall and Quinby, E. G. Wright, and the Boston Musical Instrument Manufactury made instruments for this ensemble.

=== Concert band ===
The cornet features in the British-style concert band, and early American concert band pieces, particularly those written or transcribed before 1960, often feature distinct, separate parts for trumpets and cornets. Cornet parts are rarely included in later American pieces, however, and they are replaced in modern American bands by the trumpet. This slight difference in instrumentation derives from the British concert band's heritage in military bands, where the highest brass instrument is always the cornet. There are usually four to six B♭ cornets present in a British concert band, but no E♭ instrument, as this role is taken by the E♭ clarinet.

=== Fanfareorkest ===
Fanfareorkesten ("fanfare orchestras"), found in only the Netherlands, Belgium, northern France, and Lithuania, use the complete saxhorn family of instruments. The standard instrumentation includes both the cornet and the trumpet; however, in recent decades, the cornet has largely been replaced by the trumpet.

=== Jazz ensemble ===
In old-style jazz bands, the cornet was preferred to the trumpet, but from the swing era onwards, it has been largely replaced by the louder, more piercing trumpet. Likewise, the cornet has been largely phased out of big bands by a growing taste for louder and more aggressive instruments, especially since the advent of bebop in the post-World War II era.

Jazz pioneer Buddy Bolden played the cornet, and Louis Armstrong started off on the instrument, but his switch to the trumpet is often credited with the beginning of the trumpet's dominance in jazz. Cornetists such as Bubber Miley and Rex Stewart contributed substantially to the Duke Ellington Orchestra's early sound. Other influential jazz cornetists include Freddie Keppard, King Oliver, Bix Beiderbecke, Ruby Braff, Bobby Hackett, and Nat Adderley. Notable performances on cornet by players generally associated with the trumpet include Freddie Hubbard's on Empyrean Isles, by Herbie Hancock, and Don Cherry's on The Shape of Jazz to Come, by Ornette Coleman. The band Tuba Skinny is led by cornetist Shaye Cohn.

=== Symphony orchestra ===
Soon after its invention, the cornet was introduced into the symphony orchestra, supplementing the trumpets. The use of valves meant they could play a full chromatic scale in contrast with trumpets, which were still restricted to the harmonic series. In addition, their tone was found to unify the horn and trumpet sections. Hector Berlioz was the first significant composer to use them in these ways, and his orchestral works often use pairs of both trumpets and cornets, the latter playing more of the melodic lines. In his Symphonie fantastique (1830), he added a counter-melody for a solo cornet in the second movement (Un Bal).

Cornets continued to be used, particularly in French compositions, well after the valve trumpet was common. They blended well with other instruments and were held to be better suited to certain types of melody. Tchaikovsky used them effectively this way in his Capriccio Italien (1880).

From the early 20th century, the cornet and trumpet combination was still favored by some composers, including Edward Elgar and Igor Stravinsky, but tended to be used for occasions when the composer wanted the specific mellower and more agile sound. The sounds of the cornet and trumpet have grown closer together over time, and the former is now rarely used as an ensemble instrument: in the first version of his ballet Petrushka (1911), Stravinsky gives a celebrated solo to the cornet; in the 1946 revision, he removed cornets from the orchestration and instead assigned the solo to the trumpet.

== See also ==
- Flugelhorn
