= Gerhard A. Meinl =

German instrument maker and politician (1957–2026)

Gerhard Anton Meinl (5 September 1957 – 26 February 2026) was a German instrument maker and politician of the Christian Social Union in Bavaria (CSU).

== Early life and education ==
Meinl was born on 5 September 1957 in Kempfenhausen, Upper Bavaria, and lived in Geretsried from childhood onward. After taking his Abitur at Gymnasium Bad Tölz, he studied law and philosophy in Munich and Fribourg, completing both German state law examinations. He then trained as a brass instrument maker and as a trumpet player before joining the family firm in 1984.

== Career ==
Meinl was a member of the seventh generation of his family to work in musical instrument making. In 1991, together with investors, he founded the TA Musik group in order to acquire the former East German Vogtländische Musikinstrumentenfabrik (B&S) from the state trust after reunification. In 1994, he opened a modern brass-instrument factory in Markneukirchen, which became home to brands including B&S, J. Scherzer and Hans Hoyer. Later, Besson and Antoine Courtois were added to the group.

He remained closely associated with the family company Wenzel Meinl in Geretsried, known particularly for low brass instruments under the Melton and Meinl Weston names. In 2012, the French company Buffet Crampon acquired B&S GmbH; Meinl remained involved with the group as a shareholder, advisor, and supervisory board member.

Meinl served from 1986 on the board of the Bundesverband der Deutschen Musikinstrumenten-Hersteller and later became its longest serving chairman. He was also active in international brass organisations and served on the board of the International Trumpet Guild from 1986 to 1993. He was a founding member of the Deutsches Tubaforum and also served on the presidium of the German Music Council.

=== Politics ===
A member of the Christian Social Union in Bavaria, Meinl sat on the city council of Geretsried from 1986 until 2026. He was also a member of the district council of Bad Tölz-Wolfratshausen from 1990 to 2008. From 2002 to 2014, he served as second mayor of Geretsried, and from 2014 until his death as third mayor. He was also active in the town's partnership with Chamalières in France.

== Death ==
Meinl died on 26 February 2026, at the age of 68.

== Honours ==
- Cross of Merit on Ribbon of the Federal Republic of Germany (2003)
- Cross of Merit, 1st Class of the Federal Republic of Germany (2014)
- Municipal Merit Medal in Bronze of the city of Geretsried (2018)
