= Soprano helicon =

Brass instrument in the helicon family

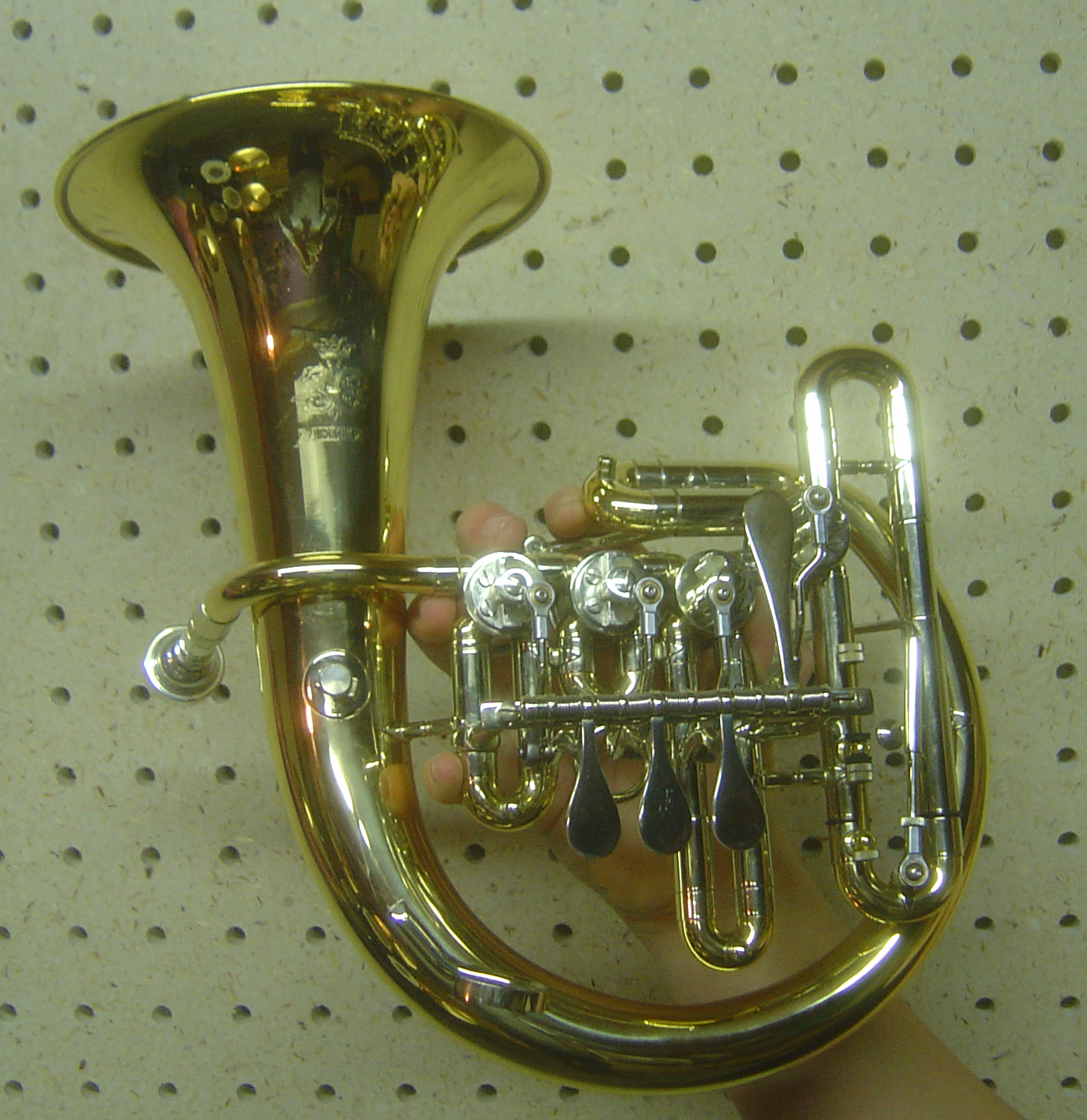
Soprano helicon in E♭

The soprano helicon (in E♭) is a coiled brass instrument from the helicon family.

The design of the modern soprano helicon takes acoustical advantage of the helicon's easy blowing, but is not simply another circular petite bugle or soprano cornet. The helicon clearly has a larger bore and wider tapered conical tube with a large bell for the instrument of its size. The pitch of E♭_{4} was deliberately chosen, so that musicians can easily play the soprano line within the middle register of the instrument going mostly up to G_{5}. E♭_{4} was also chosen for its open and piercing nature within the pitched bass winds since it was intended for the Soprano helicon to become a first and leading voice of the family (speaking in terminology of the band, taking the role of 1st Flugelhorn or 1st Cornet and not the role of Petite Bugle, or Soprano Cornet).

== History ==
The crew of Melton’s Development Department, led by Ferdinand Kleinschmidt and Andreas Gambs made the first prototype in the beginning of May 2006. This instrument had a bore of an E♭ alto horn, so the smallest Alto horn mouthpiece was used for playing it. The tapering and bell size was from the Melton MW-F10 Flugelhorn. The instrument had an intense dark sound and great low register down to the lowest pedal tones but on the other hand it had a problematic high register, starting with the written middle C. Although the intention was to make a brass wind with a voluminous dark sound, there was still problems in the case of the first prototype - mostly caused by creating a soprano instrument with a timbre of an alto.

So the next prototype, which was ready a month later, used a regular bore of B♭ Flugelhorn and a deep cup Flugelhorn mouthpiece. The tapering of the main tube had to be reshaped but the bell size stayed the same – 160 mm (6 1/4 in). The instrument had four valves (the 4th used as a quart valve). The main tube was also reshaped by moving the tuning slide after the 4th valve instead of having it at the beginning like the Flugelhorns. The 4th valve also had a trigger mechanism (which is operated with the right thumb) to extend the tube for better intonation of tones between low F-sharp and pedal C. The 4th valve itself is operated by the left hand. Another characteristic of this instrument was the bore profile, which remained conical even between the valve sections. The instrument still preserved the richness and volume of the 1st prototype, had a great low register, and it also played well in the higher "soprano" tessitura.

The instrument was ready for the first public appearance. Matej Rihter, the eminent Slovenian trumpeter gave its first performance, playing Après un rêve by Gabriel Fauré by himself on the MID EUROPE Festival 2006 in Schladming on 14 July. After this debut, the instrument had to go back to the Melton factory in Geretsried for further improvements and finalization. One of the problems was the complicated right thumb mechanism for 4th valve trigger which was very indirect and so far slow in reaction. The concept was changed and the trigger is now operated with the left hand. Since the main tube tended to be too long, the general intonation was a bit flat. With simple pulling out a general tuning slide and tuning slides on the third valve, an E♭ instrument could be easily changed from E♭ to a D instrument. This is especially appropriate for performing the baroque and classical repertoire for corno da caccia, which was often composed "in D". Ferdinand and Andreas decided to equip the instrument with a set of the two tuning slides (D and E♭) and two 2nd valve slides. Then the Soprano helicon needed a lacquer and Melton Kunstgravur. By the end of September 2006 the first Soprano helicon was completely finished and sold to Irena Nadler who is now the first regular student in the world, learning this instrument.

The Helicon Ensemble, conducted by Igor Krivokapič, was formed in September 2014 at the Ljubljana Conservatory of Music and Ballet and is the only helicon ensemble in the world. In addition to Irena Nadler, the first professional helicon student, Vidor Krivokapic and Bruno Zizmund also play the soprano helicon within the ensemble.

== Sound characteristics ==
As expected, the Soprano helicon:

- Has its own and special timbre and musical personality (to illustrate it: halfway between modern valve corno da caccia and B-flat flugelhorn)
- It’s an easy blowing instrument, well balanced in all registers and dynamics
- It has a useful range of more than three octaves, starting with pedal tones up to C_{6}
- It could be played easily at a high speed and has a potential to become a virtuoso instrument
- It sounds "big enough" to bear a leading melodic line as well as in different Band scorings as in Symphony orchestra
