= Allan Arthur Willman =

American classical composer

- Born: Allan Arthur Simpkins; May 11, 1909; Hinckley, Illinois, US
- Died: May 7, 1987 (aged 77); Cheyenne, Wyoming, US
- Resting place: Lakeview Cemetery, Cheyenne
- Other name: Alan Samar (pseudonym)
- Education: Knox College (1928); Chicago Musical College (1938)
- Occupations: Classical pianist, composer, professor
- Years active: 1926–1989
- Employer: University of Wyoming
- Organization(s): Fellow, MacDowell Colony (Summer 1940)
- Notable work: "Solitude", symphonic poem, for orchestra
- Style: Early 20th-century contemporary classical
- Partner: Regina Kastberg Hansen (1914–1965)
- Awards: 1934 Paderewski Prize for Symphonic Work by an American-born composer

Allan Arthur Willman (variant spellings Alan & Wilman; né Allan Arthur Simpkins; 11 May 1909 Hinckley, Illinois 7 May 1989 Cheyenne, Wyoming) was an American classical pianist, composer, music pedagog at the collegiate level, and longtime chairman of the Department of Music at the University of Wyoming. Willman was a vanguard creator and influential exponent of twentieth-century contemporary music. As chairman of the music department at the University of Wyoming, he is credited with rapidly expanding music arts within the institution. He led the development of a more comprehensive Music Department for aspiring academicians and professionals in performance, composition, education, and musicology. Between 1940 and 1950, enrollment in the Music Department quadrupled. Willman was founder of the Wyoming Music Teachers Association; and—with Wyoming businessman and composer George William Hufsmith, Jr. (1924–2002), and Casper conductor Ernest Gilbert Hagen (1913–2000)—Willman was co-founder of the Grand Teton Music Festival in 1962.

== Career ==
=== Early life ===
Born in Hinckley, Illinois, Willman grew up in Abingdon.

=== Higher education ===
Willman earned a Bachelor of Music degree from Knox College Conservatory of Music in 1928 (age 19) under his original name, Allan Arthur Simpkins. He went on to earn a Master of Music degree from Chicago Musical College in 1930, where he studied with Maurice Aronson (1869–1946), Alexander Raab, and Lillian Powers (1886–1973), who was an associate teacher with Raab and a former pupil of Theodor Leschetizky and Giuseppe Ferrata (1865–1928), who in turn was a certified pupil of Franz Liszt. Willman then studied in Paris with Nadia Boulanger and Thomas de Hartmann. Willman had been recommended to Boulanger by Paderewski. After World War II, while serving as Chairman of the Department of Music at Wyoming, Willman took leave during the 1947–48 school year to study in Lausanne and Paris—Robert R. Becker (1909–1997), a virtuoso violinist and violist who began teaching at Wyoming in 1941, served as Acting Chairman during Willman's sabbatical.

=== Performance career ===
As a concert pianist, Willman performed throughout the United States and in Europe. During the summer of 1953, Willman made a European concert tour with Rudolf Kolisch, artist-in-residence at the University of Wyoming and leader of the Pro Arte Quartet They performed in cities that included Vienna and Berlin and over numerous radio networks. In particular, they performed Arnold Schoenberg's "Fantasie for Violin and Piano," Op. 47, composed in 1949 and published by Edition Peters in 1952. They also performed works of Ernst Krenek, Edward Kilenyi, Beethoven, Schubert, and Kolisch.

Kolisch was Arnold Schoenberg's pupil and brother-in-law by way of his sister, Gertrud. Kolisch and Willman performed four times at the Arnold Schoenberg Chamber Music Festival sponsored by the International Summer School for New Music at Darmstadt and Frankfurt, July 16–30, 1952.

=== Artistic residency ===
Nominated by composer A. Albert Noelte (1885–1946) of Northwestern University, Willman was accepted as a fellow of the MacDowell Colony in the summer of 1940 Willman worked there from August 4 to September 7, 1940, and composed "Where the Lilac Blows" for voice and piano. He also befriended other composers, including Mabel Wheeler Daniels and Normand Lockwood. Daniels kept in touch with Willman, writing on a least one occasion seeking advice on a composition. Lockwood composed in Laramie between 1955 and 1957.

=== Teaching career, professorship, and music department head ===
==== Chicago area ====
After graduating from the Chicago Musical College in 1930, Willman began teaching at the Boguslawsky School of Music in Chicago—Moissaye Boguslawski had been a piano teacher at the Chicago Musical College.

==== University of Wyoming ====
After returning from Paris in 1936 Willman began teaching music at University of Wyoming, where he remained until retirement in 1974. From the school years 1941–1942 to 1973–1974, he was head of the Department of Music. Willman was a proficient recruiter of visiting professors that included:

- Harald Brager-Nielsen (no) (1949–1959), then of the University of Oslo
- Gunnar Johansen (1949–1950), then of the University of Wisconsin
- Darius Milhaud (late 1940s to early 1950s), then of Paris Conservatory

Willman was drafted into the U.S. Army March 1943 and served as an assistant director of the 524th Army Air Force Band, Sheppard Field, Texas. He also composed and arranged for the Army Air Corps radio program, as well as a small orchestra. During his time in the Army, George William Gunn (1899–1966) was acting Chairman of the Music Division at the University of Wyoming. Having served as Chairman of the Music Division at the University of Wyoming for 32 years, Willman is, as of 2014, the longest serving chairman in the history of the institution.

A 1948 University of Wyoming publication profiled four classical music composers at the university:

- Hugh Allan MacKinnon (1891–1981), who also was an organist of international rank and resident organist at St. Matthew's Cathedral in Laramie since 1929
- Allan Willman
- James Bruce Rodgers (1916–1992), hired by Wyoming in 1947, went on to become Chairman of the Music Department at University of Puget Sound in 1953
- Regina Willman

As a collaborative achievement, Willman was a senior faculty administrator involved with the approval and design of the Fine Arts Center at the University of Wyoming, which opened in 1972.

=== Family ===
Willman was the third of five children born to the marriage of Arthur Burton Simpkins, DDS (1872–1937), and Lulu (née Louis Catherine Willman; 1872–1961). His brother and three sisters all predeceased him:

- Thomas Hughes Simpkins (1903–1934)
- Sylvia Hope Ann Simpkins (1901–1986), married to Arthur Leslie Decker (1898–1981)
- Eudora Mary Simpkins (1900–1986), married to Merle Robb Gallup (1889–1965)
- Isabel Burton Simpkins (1912–1939)

In 1942, Willman married Regina Kastberg Hansen (1914–1965), also a composer. In 1956, after suffering from cancer for 8 years, Regina left Allan, and soon thereafter, they divorced. But they remained in close contact until she died in 1965, after 17 years of cancer. Regina and Allan never had any children and Allan never remarried.

Willman's original manuscripts, letters from prominent musicians, 26 various musical instruments including Willman's piano, art work and some of Willman's personal library were devised under the will of his estate to his nephew, Gordon Alban Gallup (born 1927), a retired professor (physics/astronomy) at the University of Nebraska in Lincoln.

== Selected works ==
=== Original compositions ===
- "Pièce Fantastique", for piano, composed in 1926, while at Knox College

Dedicated to Rudolf Ganz
Manuscript, by Willman Chicago: Chicago: Clayton F. Summy Co. (1919); OCLC 26168495
Manuscript, by Alan Samar (pseudonym of Willman), Chicago: Clayton F. Summy Co. (1929); OCLC 299606621
Performed with the Canton Symphony Orchestra, February 17, 1930
Troy Sanders, piano, Rudolf Ganz, conductor (substituting for Vladimir Horowitz)

- "Theme and Variations", by Alan Samar (pseudonym of Willman)
- "Sonata No. 1"
- "Sonata No. 2", by Alan Samar (pseudonym of Willman)
- "Elevation", for piano, manuscript (inscription "Chicago – 1928") (1928); OCLC 26076049
- "Toccatina", for piano, manuscript (1928; ©1962); OCLC 26288886
- "Capriccio", piano solo, Op. 2, manuscript (1928); OCLC 21084845, 26075900
- "Solitude", symphonic poem, for orchestra, words by Percy Bysshe Shelley: "Alastor, or The Spirit of Solitude"

Dedicated to Willman's benefactor, Emily Irish Picher (née Stanton; 1877–1941), widow of Oliver Sheppard Picher (1875–1920)
Manuscript (1929); OCLC 83691458
Manuscript (1929); OCLC 18892332
Manuscript (1931); OCLC 57367809

- "A Ballad for the Night", for string quartet and solo voice, words by Margaret Louisa Woods

Manuscript (1930); OCLC 18900848
Manuscript, transcribed for voice and piano (1930); OCLC 18900970

- "Alchemy", for voice & piano, music by Willman, poem by Francis Carlin (1882–1945) (©1962)

Dedicated to Willman's benefactor, Emily Irish Picher (née Stanton; 1877–1941), widow of Oliver Sheppard Picher (1875–1920)
Manuscript (1933); OCLC 31085894
Manuscript (194?); OCLC 18900081

- "Truth", poem by John Masefield (1935)

Written in 1935, while in Paris; Willman's notes indicated that the work was suggested by "E.P" (Emily Picher)
Manuscript (1935)

- "Symphonic Overture" †

Manuscript (bound copy, 96 pages), completed April 1936
Composed as a study in orchestration while a student of Hartmann in Paris

- "Fugue"

Manuscript, written while a student of Hartmann (inscription: "Paris, September 1935")

- "Tracery", for piano

Manuscript (1942) (inscription: "For Joseph Bloch—April 1942 AAW"); OCLC 696822810
Joseph Bloch Music Collection; OCLC 753989541

- "Where the Lilac Blows", for voice & piano, words by Adelaide Crapsey (©1962)

Manuscript (inscribed "Peterborough") (Summer 1940); OCLC 31085903
Manuscript (195?); OCLC 18900301
New York: Kelton-Romm Music Co. (1962); OCLC 18900433

- "Past Surmise", poem by Emily Dickinson
- "Tone Poem"

Dedicated to the poet Sarah Salinger, Lausanne, December 1947

- "The Hymn of Free Russia", Alexandre Gretchaninoff, arranged for band by Willman to accompany a men's chorus

=== Arrangements and adaptations ===
- Bach: "Andante: from the Third sonata for unaccompanied violin", adaptation by Willman, manuscript (1928; ©1962); OCLC 26289029
- "University of Wyoming Alma Mater", composed in 1901 by June Etta Downey (1875–1932), arranged in 1943 by Willman; OCLC 18933843

Preserving the melody, Willman changed the meter from 3/4 to 4/4 and refined the harmony

- Rachmaninoff: "Vocalise", Op. 34, No. 14; transcribed for two pianos Willman (196?); OCLC 20301409
- "Intermezzo Appassionato", composed by Albert Noelte, orchestrated by Willman (1930s)

=== Arrangements for the 534th Army Air Corps Band at Shepperd Field ===
- "The Hymn of Free Russia", Alexandre Gretchaninoff, arranged for band by Willman to accompany a men's chorus †
- "I'm a Wandr'in", an old slave song by Samuel Gaines, arranged for the Sheppard Field Concert Band by Willman†
- "The Chinese National Anthem", by Cheng Maoyun, arranged for band by Willman †
- "The Australian National Anthem", by Peter Dodds McCormick, arranged for the Air Force Band by Willman †
- "United Nations", by Shostakovitch arranged for band by Willman †

† Private collection of Willman's nephew, Gordon Alban Gallup (born 1927), Lincoln, Nebraska

== Other publications ==
- I Am a Composer, by Arthur Honegger; translated by Wilson Ober Clough (1894–1990) in collaboration with Willman, St. Martin's Press (1966); OCLC 223898, 559737111, 852044932

The original article by Honegger, "Je suis compositeur" (1951; OCLC 1293409) was part of a series titled "Mon métier" ("My Profession"); OCLC 718451858. Published in Paris by Éditions du Conquistador (fr), the series is a collection of biographies or memoirs by notable people from a wide range of professions describing their avocations. Clough was a poet and English professor at the University of Wyoming for more than 25 years, from 1924 to 1961. The publication was highly reviewed and is widely cited.

== Awards ==
- Frederick Stock Fund: Frederick Stock, conductor of the Chicago Symphony, after hearing Willman perform an original composition, gave him a check to do use as he wished. Willman submitted his work, "Solitude", to the Paderewski competition and won $1000
- 1934 Paderewski Prize for a symphonic work; "Solitude". The work was premiered in Boston at Symphony Hall, April 20, 1936, by the Boston Symphony, Serge Koussevitzky, conducting. The music is premised on the poem Alastor, or The Spirit of Solitude by Shelley; Willman used the prize money to travel to Paris to study with Boulanger and Hartmann. While studying in Paris for a year, he befriended prolific musicians, including Darius Milhaud.
- Fellowship of American Composers

== Selected discography ==
- "Fantasy for Violin and Piano", Op. 47, Arnold Schoenberg, Rudolf Kolisch, violin; Willman, piano
1. Live, July 27, 1953 (reel-to-reel tape); OCLC 77858796
2. The RIAS Second Viennese School Project: Berlin, 1949–1965, Audite (4 CDs) (Kolisch & Willman are on the 4th CD) (2012); OCLC 834993726, 818951228, LCCN 2013-627132

Live, August 28, 1953

== Collections ==
- Allan Arthur Willman Papers, 1929–1987, University of Wyoming, American Heritage Center; OCLC 181376313
- Regina Willman papers, 1934–1971, University of Wyoming, American Heritage Center; OCLC 182546587
- Rudolf Kolisch papers, 1886–1978: Guide, Houghton Library, Harvard College Library

Manuscripts of Allan Arthur Willman

- Edwin A. Fleisher Orchestral Collection, Free Library of Philadelphia
- New Music USA (American Music Center and Meet The Composer merged in 2011 to form New Music USA)

== Notable students ==
- Zenobia Powell Perry, composer

== Affiliations ==
- American Association of University Professors (1938)
- Pi Kappa Lambda, men's honorary organization for music students and teachers; inducted while attending Knox College Conservatory of Music under his original surname, Allan A. Simpkins
