= Contrabass trumpet =

Rare brass instrument

- Contrabass trumpet in F by Lars Gerdt, Stockholm

Brass instrument
- Classification: Aerophone; Wind; Brass
- Hornbostel–Sachs classification: 423.233.2 (Valved labrosone with cylindrical bore longer than 2 metres)
- Developed: Mid-20th century

Related instruments
- Bass trumpet; Contrabass trombone; Cimbasso; Tuba

Musicians
- Roger Bobo; Vairis Nartišs

Builders
- Lars Gerdt

The contrabass trumpet is the largest, lowest-pitched, and rarest member of the trumpet family, sounding below the bass trumpet. Only a very small number of instruments exist. The instrument appeared in the mid-20th century and has no orchestral or jazz repertoire. Usually built in 12-foot (12′) F a perfect fourth below the B♭ bass trumpet, it has the same length as the F contrabass trombone, cimbasso, or tuba. When built larger still in 18′ B♭, it is sometimes called a subcontrabass trumpet.

== History ==
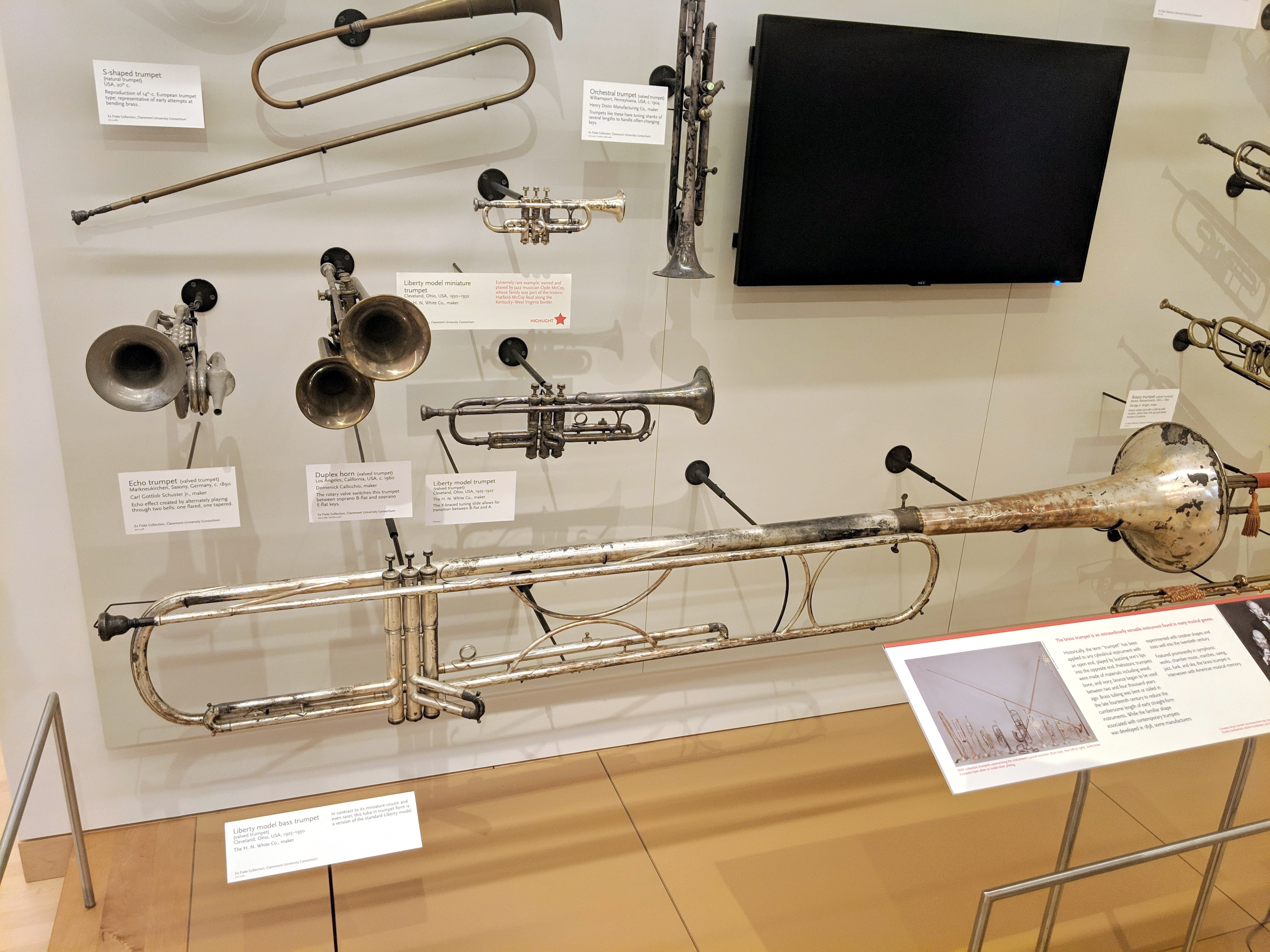
Contrabass trumpet in B♭, c. 1925–1930 by H. N. White Company. Musical Instrument Museum, Phoenix, Arizona

A novelty contrabass trumpet appeared in 1962 on the TV show I've Got a Secret played by the tubist Don Butterfield. The instrument was built in c. 1925–1930 by the H. N. White Company in 18-foot (18′) B♭, the same register as the B♭ contrabass tuba and two octaves below the standard B♭ trumpet. It was loaned to the show from the Claremont College University musical instrument collection, which now resides in the Musical Instrument Museum in Phoenix, Arizona.

In 1967, the tubist Roger Bobo, then principal tuba with the Los Angeles Philharmonic, commissioned a contrabass trumpet from the Californian instrument maker George Strucel. Dissatisfied with the sound of his contrabass trombone while recording the Canzoni e Sonate by Gabrieli, Bobo had Strucel build an instrument in 12′ F in the shape of an enlarged bass trumpet, made from spare tubing and a bass trombone bell from the Bach factory.

Later, in the 1990s Carl Kleinsteuber, then principal tuba with Residentie Orchestra in The Hague, made four similar contrabass trumpets, based on the Strucel design. He made them cheaply out of spare brass instrument parts as "fun" instruments, acknowledging the absence of any known repertoire. In the early 2000s, the Latvian trombonist Vairis Nartišs built four 18′ B♭ instruments, which he called subcontrabass trumpets. Two whereof are now in museum collections.

== Construction ==
The contrabass trumpet is only offered by one manufacturer, Lars Gerdt in Sweden. It is based on the Bobo-Strucel instrument in F and built to order, with three piston valves and a fourth rotary valve. Its 14.3-millimetre (0.562 in) cylindrical bore and 245 mm (9½ in) diameter bell are the same as a modern bass trombone, and it uses a small-shank tuba mouthpiece.

== Performance ==
The weight and unwieldy shape of contrabass trumpets make them difficult to hold up like a regular trumpet, so they are often played mounted to an adjustable floor rod. The timbre from the cylindrical-bore construction is similar to a bass or contrabass trombone, and the valves and similar range allow them to be readily substituted with a cimbasso.

== Repertoire ==
The contrabass trumpet, being a relatively recent invention, has no historical classical or jazz repertoire. Whilst it has not gained wide appeal, it occasionally appears in contemporary works. The Slovenian composer Igor Krivokapič includes one in his 2021 Symphony No. 5 Sedem trobent Apokalipse (lit. 'Seven Trumpets of the Apocalypse').
