= Paderewski Prize =

The Paderewski Prize for American Composers (aka Paderewski Fund for the Encouragement of American Composers) was a prize awarded to American composers every three years from 1901 to 1948. The prizes were sums of money ($1000 for a symphonic work, $500 or chorus and chamber) offered by the Trustees of the Paderewski Fund for American composers of (i) the best symphonic music and (ii) the best chamber music. For reference, $1000 in 1920 would be worth about $12,331 in 2014, assuming an annual inflation rate of 2.71%. The prestige of the prize far outweighed the cash benefit. In most cases, the publicity from the prizes led to assurances of international performances.

Paderewski established a similar fund for Composers in Leipzig in 1898.

== History ==
On May 15, 1900, Paderewski established the Ignacy Jan Paderewski Trust of $10,000. In November 1900, Paderewski defined a series of prizes, under the Paderewski Trust, for the encouragement of American composers. Initially the prize categories, limited to American composers, were (i) piece for full orchestra, (ii) piece for chorus with orchestra accompaniment, with or without solo voice parts (iii) a piece for chamber music for any combination of instruments. The works were submitted anonymously — under an assumed name or motto, accompanied with a seal envelope containing the composers name; and the works must never have been performed in public or offered at any previous competition.

The prize was actually intended to launch in 1897. In a letter dated April 21, 1896, Paderewski expressed to William Steinway his gratitude to Americans, with $10,000, his wish to establish a fund with Henry Lee Higginson of Boston and William Mason of New York serving as co-trustees. The initial prize sums were to be $500 for a full symphony work, $500 for a choral work with orchestra, and $200 for a chamber work. William Steinway, who died in 1896, had added $1,500 around the time of his death, in order to make the prize immediately operative.

== Trustees ==
Two of the fund's founding trustees were Henry Lee Higginson and William Payne Blake (1846–1922), a banker. Higginson died in 1919 and Blake died on March 7, 1922. In June 1922, Paderewski appointed successor trustees Arthur D. Hill (1869–1947) and Joseph Adamowski (1862–1930). Adamowski was a Polish-born American cellist with the Boston Symphony and relative of Paderewski. He was also the father of Tadeusz Adamowski, 1928 Olympic Polish hockey player and Helenka Pantaleoni, silent film actress and founding director of UNICEF.

Other trustees

Harrison Keller
Wallace Goodrich (1871–1952), New England Conservatory faculty from 1897 to 1947
Adams Sherman Hill (1896–1968) (son of Arthur D. Hill)

== Selected prize recipients ==
Competition for composers born in America

1901:
Winners were announced from New York on October 30, 1901.
Symphony:
Henry Kimball Hadley; "Symphony No. 2", in F Minor "The Four Seasons", motto, "Geheimness"
Chorus:
Horatio William Parker; "A Star Song", for voice solos, chorus, and orchestra
Chamber:
Arthur Bird; "Serenade for Wind Instruments", motto, "Vento"
Judges:
Wilhelm Gericke, Benjamin Johnson Lang; Carl Zerrahn; William Foster Apthorp; Henry Edward Krehbiel; William James Henderson; H. T. Finck, James Gibbons Huneker; and Samuel Sanford — Zerrahn, Finck, Huneker, and Sanford did not vote because they were in Europe at the time.
Notes:
68 compositions were submitted.

1905:
Winners were announced from New York by the judges on November 17, 1905.
Symphony:
Arthur Shepherd; "Overture Joyeuse"
Chorus:
No award given.
Chamber:
No award given.
Judges:
Benjamin Johnson Lang; John Knowles Paine; Franz Kneisel; Walter Damrosch; Henry Edward Krehbiel
Notes:
Approximately 80 manuscripts were submitted. A minor scandal transpired by the submission of a symphonic work titled "Palisades Overture", attributed to John Rice, Jr., of Hudson Heights, New Jersey. It was actually a manuscript copy of Berlioz's "Le Corsaire", the same work that Damrosch had conducted November 30, 1905. The incident was easily detected by the judges, reported to the trustees, who, in turn, delivered a letter to Rice, demanding an explanation. Rice denied any involvement. The competition was unaffected by the incident, but gained wide attention in the news media.

1909:
Winners were announced from Boston by the Judges on January 12, 1910. Entry deadline was September 1, 1909.
Symphony:
Paul Hastings Allen; "Symphony", in D Major, "Pilgrim"
Chorus:
David Stanley Smith; "The Fallen Star", Op. 26 (cantata); OCLC 25720997
Chamber:
Rubin Goldmark; "Quartet for piano and strings", in A Major, Op. 12; OCLC 15057650
Judges:
George Whitefield Chadwick; Horatio William Parker; Frank Van der Stucken

1911–1919:
Competition hiatus — New England Conservatory, in 1921, because serving as custodian of the competition, Mrs. Elizabeth C. Allen (born 1872), secretary of the Paderewski Fund; the competition, henceforth offered prizes in two categories: Symphonic and Chamber

1921:
The winner was announced by the New England Conservatory on July 29, 1922. Entries must have been received between December 20 and December 31, 1921.
Symphony:
No award given, for a lack of submissions meeting contest criteria.
Chamber:
Wallingford Constantine Riegger; "Trio for Piano, Violin, and Cello", in B Minor, Op. 1; OCLC 280238, 280238, 3248704, OCLC 238232639, 223999728, 809052480
Judges:
Charles Martin Loeffler, John Wallace Goodrich (1871–1952), Frederick Stock
Notes:
The trio was Riegger's first published composition; he submitted it anonymously under the initials "D.M.I."

1928:
Winners were announced from Boston by the trustees — Arthur Dehon Hill (1869–1947) and Joseph Adamowski (1862–1930) — on December 24, 1928. Submission deadline was March 1, 1928.
Symphony:
Hans Levy Heniot (1900–1960), brother-in-law of Alexander Kipnis
Chamber:
Homer Corliss Humphrey (1880–1966); "Introduction and Allegro: Risoluto for Violin, Violoncello, and Piano"
Judges:
George W. Chadwick; Frederick Shepherd Converse; Henry Kimball Hadley

1934:
Winner was announced April 13, 1935, from New York by the trustees.
Symphony:
Allan Arthur Willman; "Solitude"; OCLC 83691458
Honorable
mention:
Charles Haubiel; "Mars ascending"; originally for piano (1917); orchestrated in 1923
Judges:
Edward Burlingame Hill; Zygmunt Stojowski; Deems Taylor
Notes:
"Solitude" was premiered in Boston at Symphony Hall, April 20, 1936, by the Boston Symphony, Serge Koussevitzky, conducting. The music is premised on the poem Alastor, or The Spirit of Solitude by Shelley.

1938:
Winners were announced on November 4, 1939.
Symphony:
Walter Helfer (1896–1959); "Prelude to a Midsummer Night's Dream"
Chamber:
Morris Mamorsky (1910–2003), "Concerto", for piano and orchestra
Judges:
Hans Lange; Quincy Porter; Zygmunt Stojowski

1942:
Winners were announced from Boston by the trustees on May 9, 1943. Entry deadline was December 31, 1942.
Symphony:
Gardner Read; "Symphony No. 2", in E Flat Minor, Op. 45 (1943); OCLC 53334421
Chamber:
David Leo Diamond; "Quartet for Piano and String Trio in E Minor" (1938)
Judges:
Howard Barlow (1892–1972); Jacques Gordon (1897–1948); Walter Piston
Notes:
Read's "Symphony No. 2" was premiered November 26, 1943, by the Boston Symphony, Read conducting

1945:
The winner was announced from Boston on March 16, 1946.
Large work:
Herbert Elwell; "Lincoln", requiem aeternam, for chorus and orchestra, text by John Gould Fletcher
Judges:
Archibald Thompson Davison, PhD; Frederick W. Kempf; Carl Keister McKinley

1948:
Winners were announced in June 1949.
Chamber:
Phyllis Hoffman (née Phyllis Gertrude Sampson; 1918–2012); "Quartet for Piano and Strings"
Judges:
Richard Burgin; Randall Thompson; Francis Judd Cooke

Paderewski Prize winners from Leipzig

1898:

Chamber:
Woitech Gavronski (Gah-vron-skee; born 1868); "String Quartet"
Symphony:
Emil Młynarski; "Concerto for Violin and Orchestra", in D Minor, Op. 11; OCLC 855981853, 846542760, 824239627
Symphony:
Sigismond Stojowski; "Symphony", in D Minor, Op. 21; OCLC 70714154, 35315333, 165481251
Concerto:
Henryk Melcer-Szczawiński; "Piano Concerto No 2", in C Minor; OCLC 77710961
Judges:
Arthur Nikisch (chair); Carl Reinecke; Julius Klengel; Friedrich R. Pfau (Leipzig music critic; died around 1906)
Notes:
Stojowski's work was the first published symphony for orchestra by a Pole. It was premiered in Leipzig under the direction of Arthur Nikisch, who also conducted its performance in Berlin.

== Selected commission recipients ==
Beginning in the 1950s, the Paderewski Fund for the Encouragement of American Composers was renamed Paderewski Fund for Composers and began awarding commissions to composers, in lieu of the competition.

| 1952: | Robert Kurka; "Symphony No. 2", Op. 24; OCLC 518503615 |
| Notes: | Premiered in San Diego on July 8, 1958 |
| 1954: | Donald Martino; "Portraits: a Secular Cantata"; OCLC 22330816 |
| 1954: | Donald Martino; "Anyone Lived in a Pretty How Town"; OCLC 25350381 |
| 1956: | Donald Martino; "Contemplations" (originally titled "Composition for Orchestra") |
| Notes: | Premiered August 1966, Berkshire Music Center, Gunther Schuller, conducting |
| 1965: | Robert Earl Middleton (born 1910); "Variations for Piano and Orchestra"; OCLC 27905876 |
| 1967: | Daniel Pinkham; "Jonah", for chorus and orchestra; OCLC 2338424 |
| Notes: | Premiered by the New England Conservatory Chorus and Orchestra, Lorna Cooke deVaron, conducting, May 17, 1967 |
| 1967: | Robert Cogan; "Whirl — ds (I)", for chorus and orchestra |
| Notes: | Premiered by the New England Conservatory Chorus and Orchestra, Gunther Schuller, conducting, December 13, 1967 |
| 1972: | Donald Martino; "Paradiso Choruses" |
| Notes: | Premiered by the New England Conservatory Chorus and Orchestra, Lorna Cooke deVaron, conducting, May 7, 1972; commissioned in honor of deVaron's 25th year as director of the NEC Chorus |
| 1972: | Ronald C. Perera (born 1941); "Apollo Circling"; OCLC 4168461 |
| Notes: | Based on James Dickey's commemorative poem "For the First Manned Moon Orbit"; OCLC 21886677, 4470457, 658271724 |
| 1975: | David Stock; "Dreamwinds"; OCLC 56977111, 48953400 |
| 1980: | Robert Leigh Selig (1939–1984); "After the Ice" |
| Notes: | Premiered December 8, 1981, at NEC; OCLC 369220982 |
