= Malcolm Peyton =

American classical composer (1932–2025)

Malcolm Cameron Peyton (January 12, 1932 – January 26, 2025) was an American composer, concert director, conductor and teacher.

== Life and career ==
Peyton was born in New York City on January 12, 1932. He grew up in Princeton, New Jersey, and received early classical training in piano starting at age 6, and in trumpet starting at age 9. From 1950 to 1956 he attended Princeton University for both undergraduate and graduate training in musical composition, studying with Edward T. Cone and Roger Sessions, and was awarded a Woodrow Wilson National Fellowship. In 1956–57 Peyton traveled on a Fulbright Scholarship to Germany to study with Wolfgang Fortner. From 1958 through 1961 Peyton, along with Edward T. Cone and William Carlin, initiated a series of contemporary chamber music concerts in New York presenting many new works.

After joining the faculty at New England Conservatory (NEC) in 1965, Peyton directed with Lyle Davidson Evenings of New Music, the first continuous contemporary music series at NEC, until 1972. Subsequently Peyton directed the Composer's Series at NEC, presenting works by faculty, invited guests, and students in NEC's Jordan Hall. Peyton lectured at Boston University in 1975 and at Princeton University in 1978. In 1980, Peyton was appointed chairman of composition at NEC, a position in which he served for many years. In 1995, he conducted the premiere of Robert Ceely's Automobile Graveyard, a full-length opera staged in Jordan Hall.

Peyton received awards from the Academy and Institute of Arts and Letters, the National Endowment for the Arts, and the Norlin Foundation. He received an honorary doctorate from New England Conservatory in 2016, recognizing his 50 years on the NEC faculty. His works are published by Boelke-Bomart/Mobart and the Association for the Promotion of New Music, and recorded on the CRI and Centaur labels.

Notable students of Malcolm Peyton included Slovenian composer Igor Krivokapič and American composer Karen Tarlow.

Peyton died on January 26, 2025, at the age of 93.

== List of compositions ==
- Two Pieces for String Orchestra (first performance by Princeton Symphony Orchestra; Nicholas Harsanyi, conductor; 1955)
- Suite for Clarinet (George Jones, clarinet; 1955)
- Chamber Cantata Part I (Susan Miller, soprano; Ray DeVoll, tenor; Gustav Meier, conductor; 1958)
- Chamber Cantata Part II (Bethany Beardslee, soprano; Ray DeVoll, tenor; Gustav Meier, conductor; 1959)
- Concerto for Violin and Orchestra (Princeton Symphony Orchestra; Joseph Kovacs, violin; Nicholas Harsanyi, conductor; 1960)
- Four Songs from Shakespeare (Shirley Suddock, mezzo-soprano; Gustav Meier, conductor; 1960)
- Choruses from e.e. cummings (New England conservatory Chorus; Lorna Cooke deVaron, conductor; 1967)
- ‘Cello Piece (Ronald Clearfield, violoncello; 1972)
- The Blessed Virgin Compared to the Air We Breathe (New England Conservatory Concert Choir; Lorna Cooke deVaron; 1974)
- Songs from Walt Whitman (Bethany Beardslee, soprano; Malcolm Peyton, piano; Eric Rosenblith, violin; 1978)
- Fantasy for 14 Players in March Tempi (1978)
- Concertine (for 17 players) (Collage; Gunther Schuller, conductor; 1981)
- Two Fantasies for Winds, Brass & Percussion (Swedish Wind Symphony Orchestra; Larry Livingston, conductor; 1982)
- Envoi for solo flute (1985)
- Songs from T. Sturge Moore (Barbara Winchester, soprano; Dinosaur Annex Music Ensemble; Malcolm Peyton, conductor; 1989)
- Suite Nocturnale for viola solo (Jonathan Bagg, viola; 1978-1991)
- String Quartet No. 1 (Borromeo String Quartet; 1991-1993)
- Apostroph (NEC Chorus and Orchestra, Tamara Brooks, conductor; 1997)
- My Glorious Lord for chorus (1998)
- Sonnets from John Donne (Jesse Coston, bass-baritone; New England Conservatory Contemporary Ensemble; Gunther Schuller, conductor; 1968-2002)
- Fantasies Concertante (Concerto for Orchestra) (Boston Modern Orchestra Project, 2002)
- String Quartet No. 2 (Ciompi Quartet 2001; Fibonacci Quartet 2005)
- Tango Steps (Cyrus Stevens, violin; Donald Berman, piano; 2005)
- Overture for Piano (Katie Reimer, piano; 2005)
- Lyric Meditations (Gregorio Rangell; 2009)
- Septet (undated)
- Little Aria (Time's Arrow Ensemble; undated)
- Warble for Lilac-Time (undated)
- A Cradle Song (undated)
- That Music Always Round Me (undated)
- For Classmates Departed (undated)
