= Sharon Ruchman =

American classical composer

Sharon Ruchman (born 1949) is an American classical music composer and musician. Ruchman's works have been performed on Connecticut Style on WTNH, channel 8 in Connecticut, at the National Composers Association in San Francisco, the Hartford Women Composers Festival, the Federation of Jewish Communities of Western Connecticut, and Pomperaug Woods in Southbury, Connecticut.

== Early life ==
Ruchman was born in New York. Her great uncle was violinist Rudolph Fuchs, who in the 1920s debuted in Steinway Hall, played for President Calvin Coolidge and was a concertmaster on KMTR in Los Angeles.

Ruchman began her musical career at age 5, composing tunes as she played piano. She began taking piano lessons at age 8. Throughout her childhood, Ruchman studied voice, dance and cello. One of her teachers was Juilliard School of Music's Rosetta Goodkind.

In high school, Ruchman developed her voice and performed in high school recitals and plays. By her junior year, she was chosen to sing with the All-County Chorus in Nassau County, All-State Chorus in New York and the All-Eastern Chorus, performed in Boston.

== Education ==
She studied at the New England Conservatory of Music and was both singer and pianist for the Conservatory choir under Lorna Cooke DeVaron. In 1971 she graduated with a Bachelor of Music Education degree.

Ruchman then attended the Yale School of Music, earning her Master of Music degree in 1973. She was a soloist in the “Mozart Requiem” with the New Haven Symphony Orchestra. She sang in other Yale performances and was chosen to participate in the Yale Summer School opera program in Norfolk, Connecticut.

== Composer ==
Ruchman taught music for many years thereafter while raising a family and following a career in singing. In 2006, she returned to Yale School of Music and studied composition with professor and composer Orianna Webb. In 2007 Ruchman began composing steadily, and since 2009 has produced at least one album each year. She composes original classical music for solo instrumentation and chamber ensembles.

== Discography ==
- 2009 Sharon Ruchman Chamber Music
- 2010 Arrival of Spring
- 2011 Remembrance
- 2012 Textures
- 2013 Love & Ceremony – Wedding Music
- 2014 A Bit of Tango and More
