= Helicon (instrument) =

Musical instrument in the tuba family

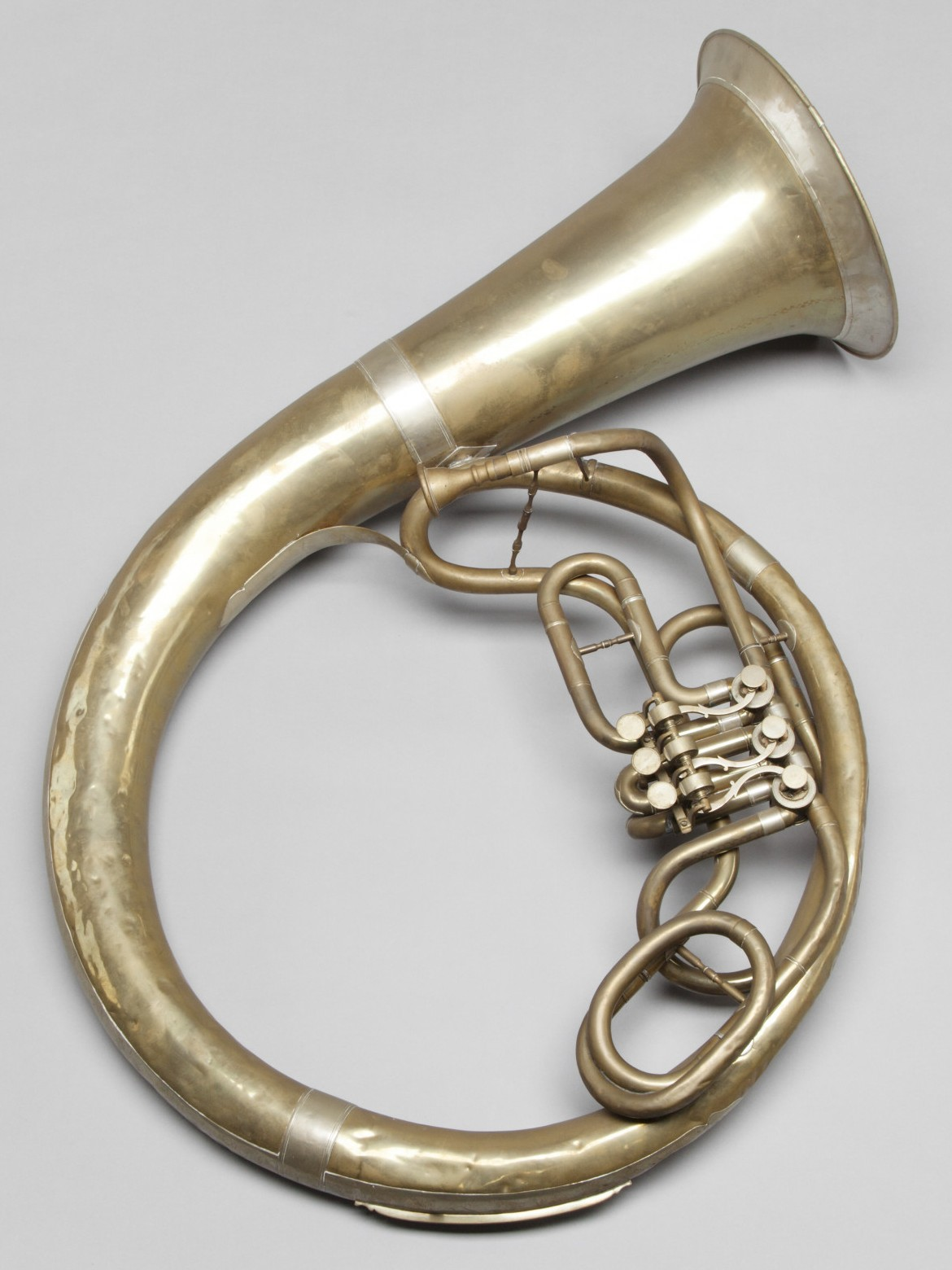

Brass instrument
- Classification: Aerophone; Wind; Brass; Bugle
- Hornbostel–Sachs classification: 423.231.2 (Valved lip-reed aerophone with wide conical bore)
- Inventor(s): Patented by Stowasser, 1848
- Developed: 1840s

Related instruments
- Tuba; Saxtuba; Sousaphone

The helicon is a brass musical instrument in the tuba family. Most are B♭ basses, but they are also built in E♭ or F, and occasionally in tenor or even smaller sizes. The helicon has a wide, roughly-circular shape designed to be worn around the player's body, with the tubing wrapped under one arm and the bell resting on the opposite shoulder.

The instrument is very popular in Central and Eastern Europe and is a common instrument for a military band and a mounted band. It is used by Ed Neuhauser of the traditional folk band Bellowhead.

The range of the B♭ helicon is two octaves below that of a B♭ cornet, thus similar to that of the more common B♭ bass tuba (though generally without the additional valves and other optional features sometimes seen on tubas, so that a few notes in the lowest range are unavailable on the helicon).

The sousaphone is a specialized version of the helicon. The first sousaphone, a non-production prototype made by J. W. Pepper & Son, Inc., had an upright bell, hence the nickname "rain catcher" because of its shape. Later production versions differ primarily in two ways: a bell shaped to face forward with a larger flare and a bell diameter of 22 to 28 inches (56–71 cm), and a "goose-neck" leadpipe which offers greater adjustability of mouthpiece position at the expense of tone quality.

== History ==
The helicon is derived from the saxhorn or the saxtuba. Helicons were first used in the 1860s in cavalry and artillery mounted bands, then later used in military marching bands.

== Helicon family ==
The Slovenian composer Igor Krivokapič invented a new family of helicons which were produced by the German manufacturer Melton:

- Soprano in E♭
- Alto in B♭
- Tenor in E♭
- Baritone in B♭
- Bass in F (or EE♭)
- Contrabass in BB♭ (or CC)
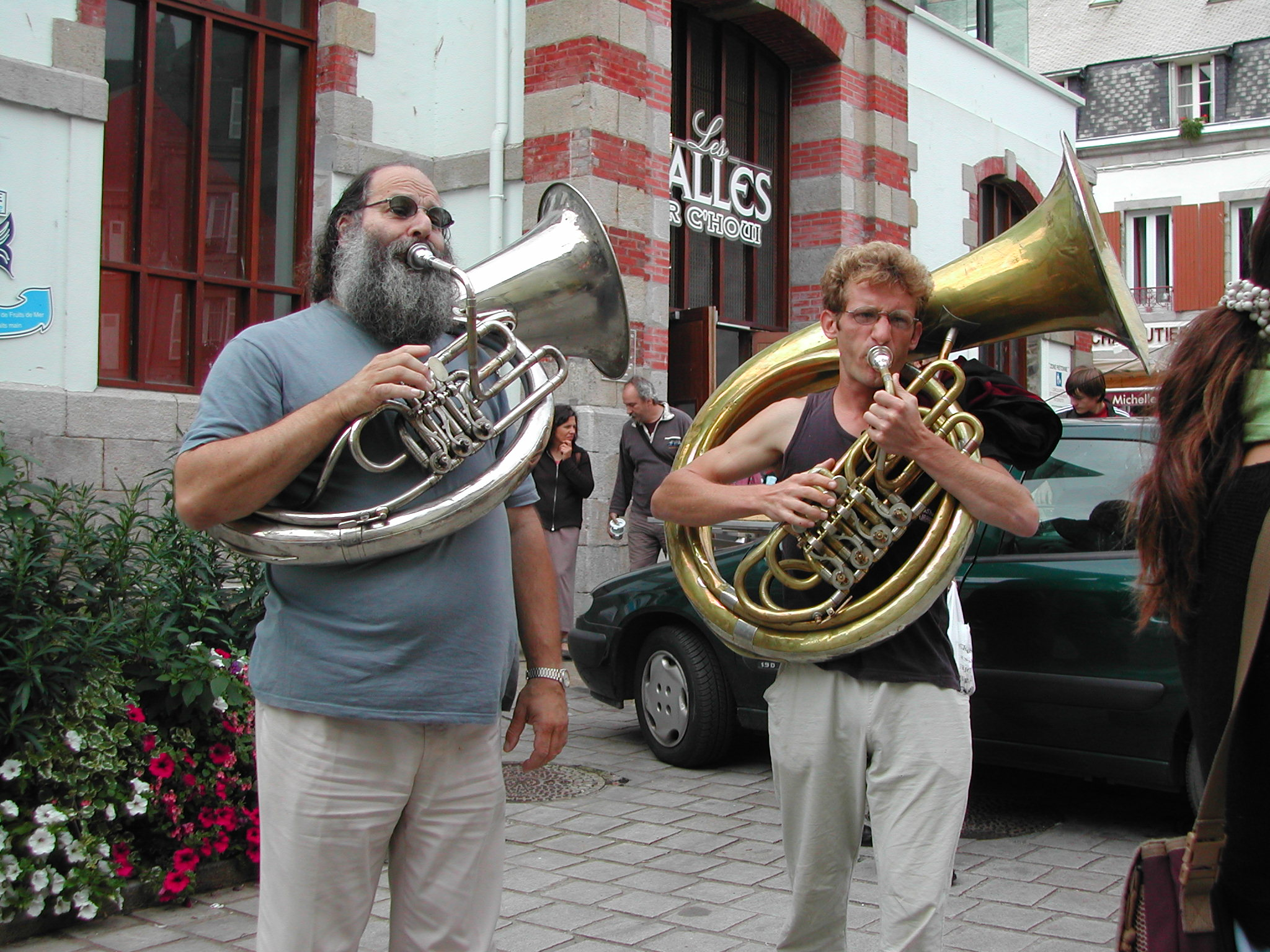
Two musicians playing helicons.

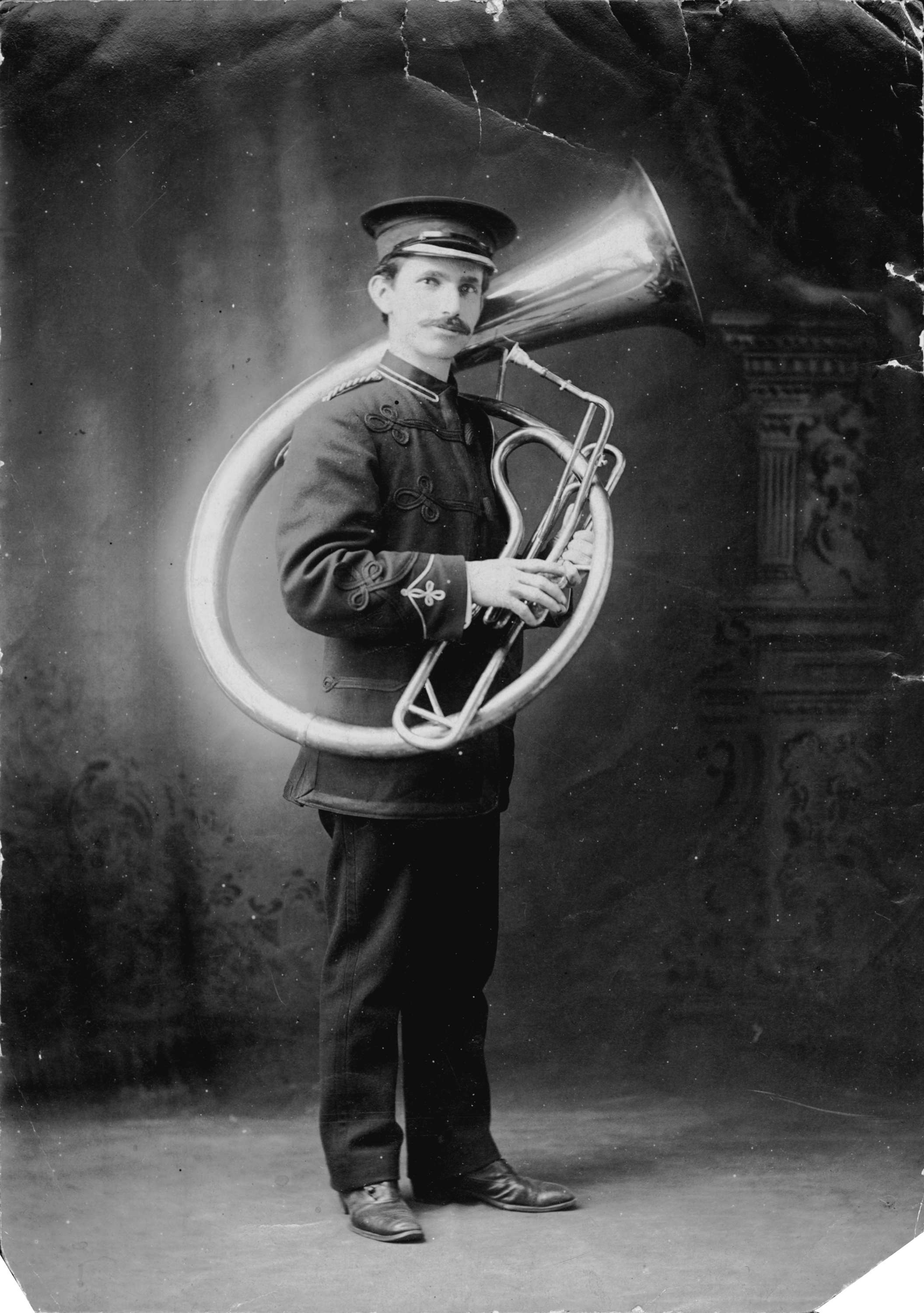
Philip Timms with his E♭ bass helicon in 1909
