= Beaussant =

Beaussant is a French surname. Notable people with the surname include:

- Antoine Beaussant (born 1957), French entrepreneur, businessman, and oboeist
- Philippe Beaussant (1930–2016), French musicologist and novelist, father of Antoine
