= Karen Tarlow =

American composer and music teacher

Karen Anne Tarlow (born September 19, 1947) is an American composer and music educator who has composed multi-media pieces and many choral works based on Hebrew texts.

Tarlow was born in Brookline, Massachusetts. She received a BM and MM from the University of Massachusetts, and a DMA from Boston University. She received a Howard Lebow Memorial Scholarship in 1972 and studied in Germany at the University of Freiburg. In 1978 she won first prize in the Boston University Composition Competition. Her teachers included Philip Bezanson, Wolfgang Fortner, Charles Fussell, Malcolm Peyton, Gardner Read, Robert Stern, Frederick Tillis and David del Tredici.

Tarlow married John Montanari in 1985. She is a retired assistant professor of music theory from the University of Massachusetts Amherst. She belongs to the American Society of Composers, Authors, and Publishers (ASCAP), and has received commissions from Da Camera Singers, the Eric Carle Museum of Picture Book Art, the Hampshire Young People's Chorus, and the Picture Book Theatre.

Tarlow's compositions are included on several commercial recordings by Navona Records. Her music is published by ECS Publishing Group, New Valley Press, Subito Music/Seesaw Press, and Treble Clef Music Press. Her works include:

== Chamber ==
- Games for Three (oboe, viola and piano)
- Three Household Miniatures (clarinet and bassoon)
- Uchronia (harp)
- Woodwind Quintet
- Zenana (violin and piano)

== Multi-media ==
- Chansons Inoocentes
- Concerto for Orchestra
- Emperor and the Nightingale
- Uncle Wiggily and the Duck Pond

== Orchestra ==
- Bachanale
- Kavanah (Remembrance)

== Vocal ==
- Ahavat Olam (With Everlasting Love; two voices and piano)
- Fields of Sorrow (women's chorus, flute, harp or piano)
- Five Yiddish Poems (a cappella choir)
- Hin'ni (Behold, I am Prepared; two voices and piano)
- "Horeini Adonai" (Teach Me Your Way, O Lord; voice and piano)
- Lieblingstier (three voices, four woodwinds and cello)
- Lowest Trees Have Tops (two voice and chamber ensemble)
- Renascence (soprano, clarinet and piano)
- Salvacion de la Primavera (women's chorus)
- "Shalom Rav" (Grant Lasting Peace; voice and piano)
- "Two Songs" (voice and piano)
- "Ush'mor Tseiteinu" (Guard Our Going Out; voice and piano)
- Yihyu I'ratzon (Let the Words of My Mouth; two voices and piano)
- "Yism'chu" (Let the Heavens be Glad; voice and piano)
