= Besson (music company) =

Musical instrument company

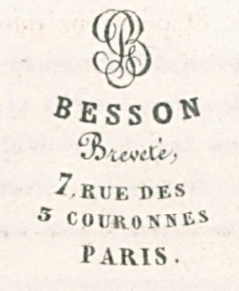
- Genre: Musical instrument manufacturers
- Founded: 1837; 189 years ago in Paris, France
- Headquarters: Mantes-la-Ville, France
- Parent: Buffet Crampon
- Website: www.besson.com

Besson is a manufacturer of brass musical instruments. It is owned by Buffet Crampon, which bought Besson in 2006 from The Music Group.

The company was formed in 1837 by Gustave Auguste Besson, who at the age of 18 produced a revolutionary design of cornet which surpassed all contemporary models. His products quickly gained a great reputation throughout Europe. In 1857, he moved to England where he built a large factory in London from which his instruments took a share of the English market and from where he exported to many countries including the United States.

The modern company produces a range of cornets, tenor horns, euphoniums, tubas, French horns and baritone horns. In its history, Besson also produced a number of other brass instruments, including a huge 'triple' B♭ tuba.

== History ==
In 1837, Gustave Auguste Besson (1820–1874) created the Besson brand in Paris with his new cornet. His instruments became famous in Europe, and he has been credited with over fifty inventions.

In 1858, following a long series of lawsuits with Adolphe Sax, Gustave-Auguste Besson left Paris to build a factory in London. Over the following years, Besson continued to manufacture in Paris and London, and also had warehouses for distribution in Brussels, Charleroi, Madrid and Barcelona. Following Gustave-Auguste Besson’s death in 1874, the company changed its name, becoming Fontaine-Besson in 1880 in France, and Besson in England.

At the same time, another English manufacturer was becoming well-known: Henri Distin, born in London in 1819.

Henry Distin and his new fluegelhorn were active in the development of brass bands in England. He created a new line of instruments under his own name, and in 1872 the Distin brand was bought by Boosey (a music publisher since 1792, and a manufacturer of instruments since 1851). D. J. Blaikely, the inventor in 1878 of an automatically compensation tuning system for valves collaborated with Distin, and together they developed a new range and improved existing models.

In the 1930s in Paris, Strasser Marigaux and Lemaire, SML, all produced instruments for Besson with Aubertin. In 1957, Couesnon bought the French company Fontaine Besson.

In London, at the same time, Boosey & Co and Hawkes & Sons of England merged to create the group Boosey & Hawkes.

At the end of the nineteenth century (1894), the Besson factory of London employed 131 workers, producing 100 brass instruments a week, and no less than 10,000 musical ensembles appeared on their contact lists. In 1925, Besson purchased Quilter, and Wheatstone & Co. in 1940. In 1948, the group Boosey & Hawkes acquired the Besson London brand.

In 2003, Boosey & Hawkes joined The Music Group. In 2006, at the initiative of its CEO, Paul Baronnat, Buffet Crampon acquired two brass instrument brands, Antoine Courtois Paris (created in 1803) and Besson (created in 1837). The company became Groupe Buffet Crampon, with two subsidiaries in the United States and Japan, and in November 2007, it appointed Antoine Beaussant as new chief executive officer.

By joining the Buffet Crampon Group, Besson has restructured and relaunched its production of professional instruments in Germany and France. The Besson student instruments continue to be manufactured in the factory near Delhi, in India, under the supervision of specialists from the Buffet Crampon Group.

== Models ==
- Concertiste – Besson's most expensive model from the 1890s to the advent of World War I. The bowed-out shape of the Concertiste's intervalve portings is the design favoured today.
- Desideratum – Besson's second most expensive model. The main difference in configuration between the Desideratum and the Concertiste models is the relationship of the leadpipe to the third valve slide.

== Counterfeit 'Bessons' instruments ==
A flood of very poor quality Indian-made instruments bearing the name Bessons entered the market in the late 1990s. They are unrelated to the Besson instruments manufactured by the company with that name. Many sales are made through online auctions. The fake instruments, particularly pocket trumpets, cornets, euphoniums, bugles and B♭ trumpets, are likely to feature a 'serial number' of H.75983 (or 84059) embossed on the top of the bell and valve keys are often hexagonal in plan view. Similar counterfeit instruments, possibly made at the same factories, have been falsely branded with other reputable manufacturers' names, such as Getzen and Boosey. These instruments are best described as novelty items since they are shoddily built from very thin metal and they are often unplayable (due to faults in the manufacturing) and untunable (the tuning slides are simply ornamentation – they do not work).

== Guitars ==
Besson guitars were produced in the 1950s. They were badged as Besson Aristone. These guitars were imported and often rebranded. Many of them were made by Framus. There was also a model made by Framus in the Besson name designed by jazz guitarist Jack Durante.

== See also ==
- Harvard University Band, owner of a Besson B♭ subcontrabass tuba, one of the largest playable tubas in the world
