= Rubin Goldmark =

American composer, pianist and educator (1872-1936)

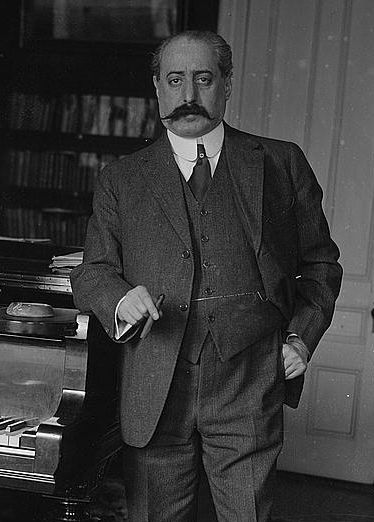
- Born: August 15, 1872; New York City, US
- Died: March 6, 1936 (aged 63); New York City, US
- Education: Vienna Conservatory
- Occupations: Composer; pianist
- Years active: 1891–1936
- Relatives: Karl Goldmark (nephew)

Rubin Goldmark (August 15, 1872 – March 6, 1936) was an American composer, pianist, and educator. He is best known as the teacher of other important composers, including Aaron Copland and George Gershwin.

== Early life ==
Rubin Goldmark was born in New York City in 1872, a nephew of composer Karl Goldmark, and of Jewish heritage. Goldmark completed his undergraduate studies at City College in New York. After completing his studies in the United States in 1889, Goldmark traveled to Austria, where he studied at the Vienna Conservatory until 1891. There he studied piano and composition, the former with Alfred von Livonius, the latter with Johann Nepomuk Fuchs.

== Return to the United States ==
After the conclusion of his studies in Vienna, Goldmark returned to United States. From 1891 to 1893 he taught piano and music theory at the National Conservatory of Music in New York City. While in New York, Goldmark also studied composition with Antonín Dvořák and piano with Rafael Joseffy. Goldmark moved to Colorado Springs, Colorado, hoping to improve his poor health, and was the director of the Colorado Conservatory of Music from 1895 to 1901.

Upon Goldmark's return to New York in 1902, he focused much of his energy on teaching. Over the 30-year period that Goldmark remained in New York he gave over 500 lectures on music, music theory, and composition, while continuing to compose. He was also the founder and frequent speaker at The Bohemians, a New York musicians' club.

== Teaching career ==
Goldmark taught composition to several private students. Goldmark taught fifteen-year-old Aaron Copland. However, Copland was critical of Goldmark, finding him "too pedantic and academic". The young George Gershwin also turned to Goldmark during the composition of his piano Concerto in F. While his Rhapsody in Blue had been orchestrated by Ferde Grofé, he wished to orchestrate his piano concerto himself, and sought Goldmark's advice. Other students of Goldmark's include composers Fannie Charles Dillon, Dorothy Priesing, Sammy Timberg, Vittorio Giannini, Frederick Jacobi and Alexei Haieff.

In 1924, Goldmark became the head of composition at the recently opened Juilliard School of Music in New York City. He remained at Juilliard until his death on March 6, 1936, at his residence at 88 Central Park West.

== Musical works ==
Goldmark's music was performed regularly during his lifetime. His Negro Rhapsody was among the most performed pieces in the seven years following World War I. In 1910, he was also awarded the 1909 Paderewski Prize for Chamber Music. His other important works include Hiawatha, The Call of the Plains, and his Requiem. Goldmark's nationalism is clearly evident from many of the titles of his works – even the ambiguously titled Requiem (perf. 1919) was inspired by Abraham Lincoln's Gettysburg Address. Goldmark's other compositions include a string quartet, a piano trio, a violin sonata, several orchestral pieces, piano music, and songs.
