= Melton Meinl Weston =

German brass instrument manufacturer

- Company type: Private
- Industry: Brass instruments
- Headquarters: Geretsried, Germany
- Area served: Worldwide
- Products: tuba; cimbasso; baritone horn; flugelhorn; bass trumpet
- Parent: Buffet Crampon
- Website: www.melton-meinl-weston.com

Melton Meinl Weston is a manufacturer of brass instruments owned by Buffet Crampon. It is based in Geretsried in Germany, and formerly based in Kraslice.

Their main brands are Melton and Meinl Weston, with current instruments bearing both logos. Despite the engraving A Division of Getzen which appears on some instruments sold in the United States, the company is part of the Buffet Crampon group.

In 1991, Gerhard A. Meinl helped found the TA Musik group to take over Vogtländische Musikinstrumentenfabrik, the B&S brand in East Germany. The group became JA Musik GmbH, and managed the Meinl-Weston, B&S, Scherzer, and Hans Hoyer brands of band instruments. In December 2012 it became part of Buffet Crampon.
