= Regina Hansen Willman =

American classical music composer

Regina Kastberg Hansen Willman (October 5, 1914 – October 28, 1965) was an American composer, born in Burns, Wyoming. She married Allan Arthur Willman in 1942; they divorced in 1956, but remained close throughout her life. Willman received a B.M. from the University of Wyoming in 1945, and a M.M. from the University of New Mexico in 1961. She studied with Darius Milhaud at Mills College, Roy Harris at Colorado College, and pursued further studies at the University of California, Berkeley, the Juilliard School, the Sorbonne, and the Lausanne Conservatory. Willman was the resident composer of the Helene Wurlitzer Foundation in Taos, New Mexico, from 1956–57 and 1960-61. Her papers are archived at the University of Wyoming.

== Works ==
Regina Willman's compositions include:

=== Ballet ===
- Doves (piano)
- Legend of the Willow Plate (1949; chamber orchestra)

=== Orchestra ===
- Anchorage Symphony
- Design for Orchestra 1 (1948)
- Design for Orchestra 2 (1953)

=== Piano ===
- Little Tailor Suite
- Steel Mill (1941; two pianos)
- Three Compositions for Piano

=== Theatre ===
- Music for Medea (text by Euripides)

=== Vocal ===
- Ante Vero Longam (1961; tenor solo, men's chorus, oboe, and piano; text by Lambertus)
- Apres le Deluge (1961; high voice and piano; text by Arthur Rimbaud)
- First Holy Sonnet (voice and string trio; text by John Donne)
- O Sleep Now (1956; medium voice and piano)
- Vocalise (voices and low strings)
