= Philip Bezanson =

American composer

Philip Thomas Bezanson (January 6, 1916 – March 11, 1975) was an American composer and educator.

== Life ==
Born in Athol, Massachusetts, Philip Bezanson graduated from Yale University School of Music in 1940. Following military service, he enrolled in the graduate program of musical composition at the State University of Iowa. He joined its faculty in 1948 and received his PhD there in 1951. In 1954, Bezanson was appointed head of the program in musical composition, and in 1961, was made a full professor.

In 1964, Dr. Bezanson was appointed to the faculty and named head of the Music Department of the University of Massachusetts Amherst. He held the latter post until 1973 when he returned to full-time teaching at the University for the last two years of his life. An influential educator and composer, Philip Bezanson helped guide the Department of Music at UMass Amherst through its period of rapid expansion in the late 1960s and early 1970s.

Dr. Bezanson was active as a composer, particularly from 1946 through 1975, and he received several awards, including the prestigious Fromm Foundation award for his Piano Sonata in 1953.

A prolific and productive composer, Bezanson won several prestigious awards and received commissions from, among others, Dimitri Mitropoulos, who commissioned a piano concerto in 1952. His most famous work is perhaps the opera Golden Child, written in 1960 to a libretto by Paul Engle. The work was commissioned by the NBC Opera Theatre and first performed on television on the Hallmark Hall of Fame program. Several of his vocal and choral works use texts by Engle as well.

His notable students included Olly Wilson, M. William Karlins, Karen Tarlow, Bruce MacCombie, Fred Tillis, and James Yannatos. See: List of music students by teacher: A to B#Philip Bezanson.

Dr. Bezanson received a Guggenheim Fellowship in 1971 and a Distinguished Alumni Award from Yale in 1974. The Bezanson Recital Hall in the Fine Arts Center of the University of Massachusetts Campus is named in his honor.

The musical manuscripts for 46 of his 47 extant compositions are housed in the Special Collections & University Archives of the University of Massachusetts at Amherst. Voice and instrumental parts for at least one of Dr. Bezanson’s works are in the Music Library of the University of Iowa.

His music is published by the American Composers Alliance.

== List of works ==
=== Stage Works ===
- Golden Child, opera in 3 acts (1960)
- Stranger in Eden, opera in 3 acts (1963)

=== Orchestral Works ===
- Symphony no 1 in b
- Symphony no 2
- Cyrano de Bergerac, overture
- Dance scherzo for small orchestra
- Fantasy, fugue and finale for strings (1951)
- Concerto for piano and orchestra (1952)
- Rondo-prelude for orchestra (1954)
- Anniversary Overture (1956)
- Capriccio Concertante (1967)
- Concertino for Oboe and String Orchestra (1969)
- Sinfonia Concertante (1971)

=== Chamber Works ===
- Sextet for woodwinds and piano (1956)
- Divertimento for eight wind instruments
- Duo for cello and piano (1965)
- Divertimento for organ, brass, and timpani (1966)
- Diversion for brass trio (1967)
- Five miniatures for clarinet & cello (1969)
- Four Bagatelles for Violin and Piano (1969)
- Brass sextet (1974)

=== Vocal Works ===
- Contrasts for voice and piano (1966)
- Dies Domini Magnus (1971)

=== Solo Instrument Works ===
- Children's Suite for Piano (1946)
- Four Piece for Carol for Piano
- Church Sonatina for Organ (1946)
