= Philip Timms =

Canadian photographer

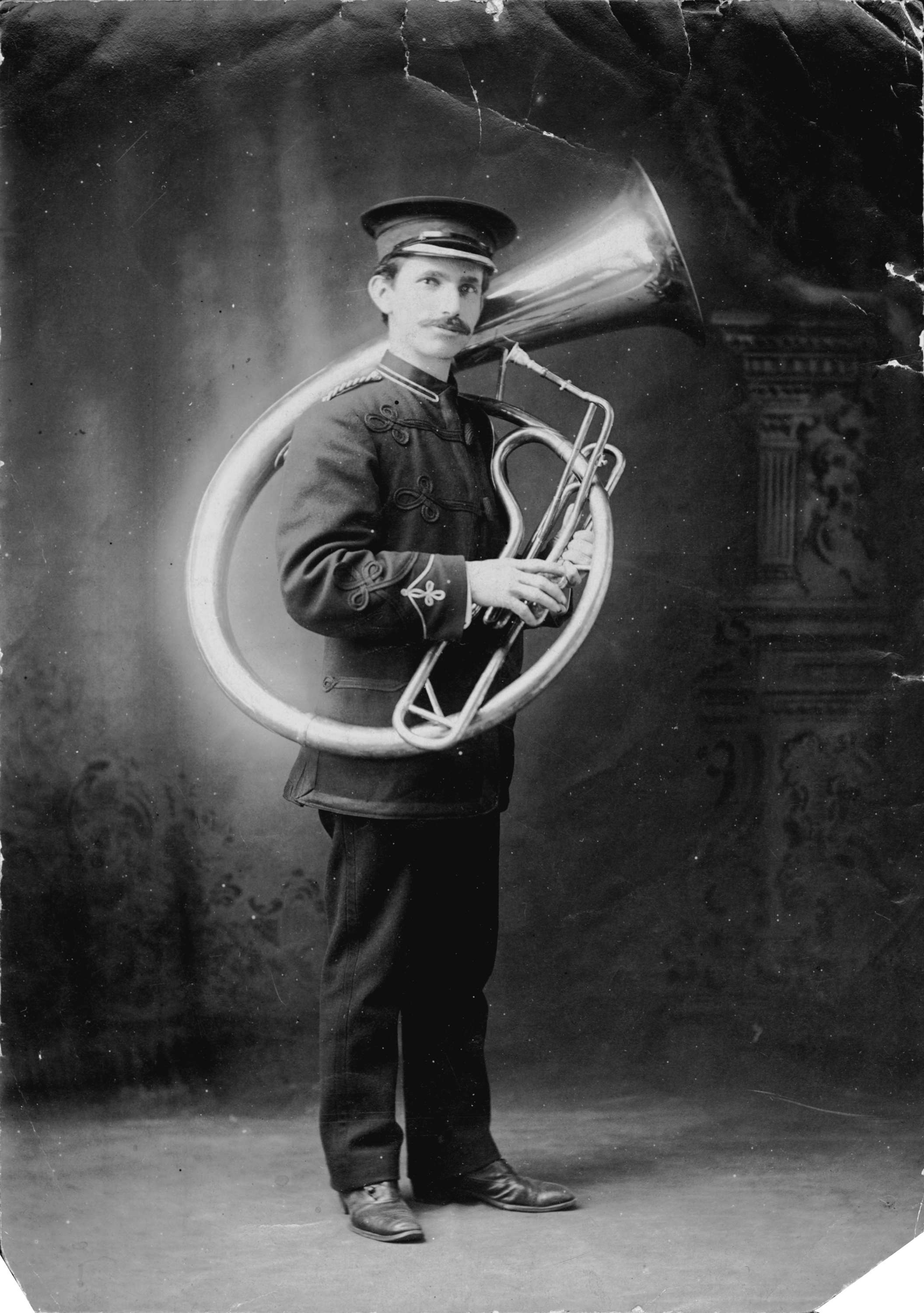
- Philip Timms in 1909 with his Helicon E flat bass, Vancouver, B.C.
- Born: Philip Thomas Timms; September 16, 1874; Toronto, Ontario, Canada
- Died: August 8, 1973 (aged 98); Vancouver, British Columbia, Canada
- Occupations: Photographer, printer, activist
- Known for: Historic photography

Philip Thomas Timms (September 16, 1874 – August 8, 1973) was a Canadian photographer and printer. He was an advocate for vegetarianism and animal welfare and against vivisection.

== Life and career ==
As an amateur he was involved in archaeology, history, music, and film. He was a member of the Royal Photographic Society and the official photographer of the Vancouver Museum. Major J.S. Matthews stated he "is a real Vancouver pioneer; handpicked, extra special, double refined and forty over proof" and Maclean's Guide to Vancouver described his works as an "invaluable contribution to our cultural heritage".

He managed his own photography shop for decades producing thousands of postcards. Between 1900 and 1910 he travelled around Vancouver on his bicycle taking many photographs of city life.

Timms became a vegetarian at the age of 27 after visiting a slaughterhouse. He advocated for animal welfare and was a member of the Anti-Vivisection Society and the SPCA. He was secretary of the Vancouver Vegetarian Society.
