= Elliot Mason =

English jazz trombonist (born 1977)

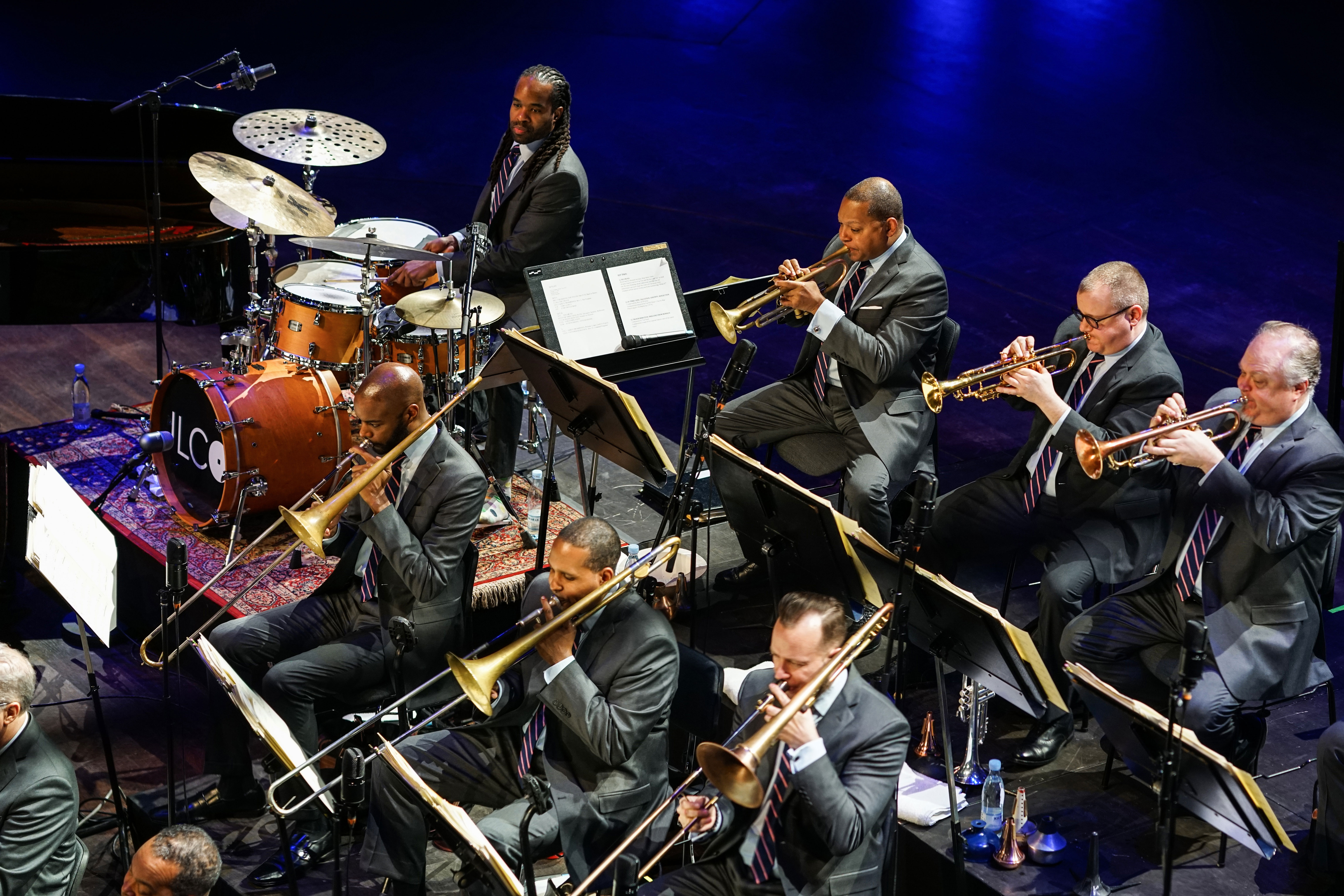
- Mason with the Jazz at Lincoln Center Orchestra in Aalborg, 2020

Background information
- Born: 13 January 1977 (age 49); Norwich, England
- Genres: Jazz
- Occupation: Musician
- Instruments: Trombone; Keyboard; Bass trumpet
- Years active: 1991–present
- Member of: Jazz at Lincoln Center Orchestra

Elliot Mason (born 13 January 1977) is an English jazz trombonist. He also plays the keyboard and the bass trumpet. He has been praised by such musicians as Michael Brecker for his technical facility and innovative harmonically complex improvisation.

== Biography ==
Born in Norwich, England, Elliot was a young talent, playing in clubs as early as age eleven. He rapidly made a name for himself in the local jazz scene. At age fourteen, he won the national Daily Telegraph Young Jazz Soloist Award and was featured at John Dankworth's Wavendon Jazz School. The following year, Elliot and his brother, trumpeter Brad, won the national Daily Telegraph competition for a second time. Mason left England at age sixteen to study at the Berklee College of Music in Boston.

In 2007, Mason joined the Jazz at Lincoln Center Orchestra. Meanwhile, Mason also plays in the Mason Brothers Band alongside his brother, Brad. Mason was a featured soloist during the JLCO 2009 premiere tour, which originally aired on PBS.

In 2008, Mason was asked to join the music faculty at Northwestern University in Illinois.

In 2016, Mason joined the music faculty at the Juilliard School in New York City.

== Discography ==
=== As leader ===
- Before, Now, & After (Self Produced, 2018)
- Mason Brothers Quintet: Two Sides One Story (Archival Records, 2010)
- Mason Brothers Quintet: Introduction (Archival Records, 2016)

== Awards ==
Elliot has received numerous accolades, including the Frank Rosolino Award and the Slide Hampton Award from Berklee College of Music. He also won the International Trombone Workshop's "Under 29" Jazz Trombone competition in 1995.
