= Paul Hastings Allen =

American composer

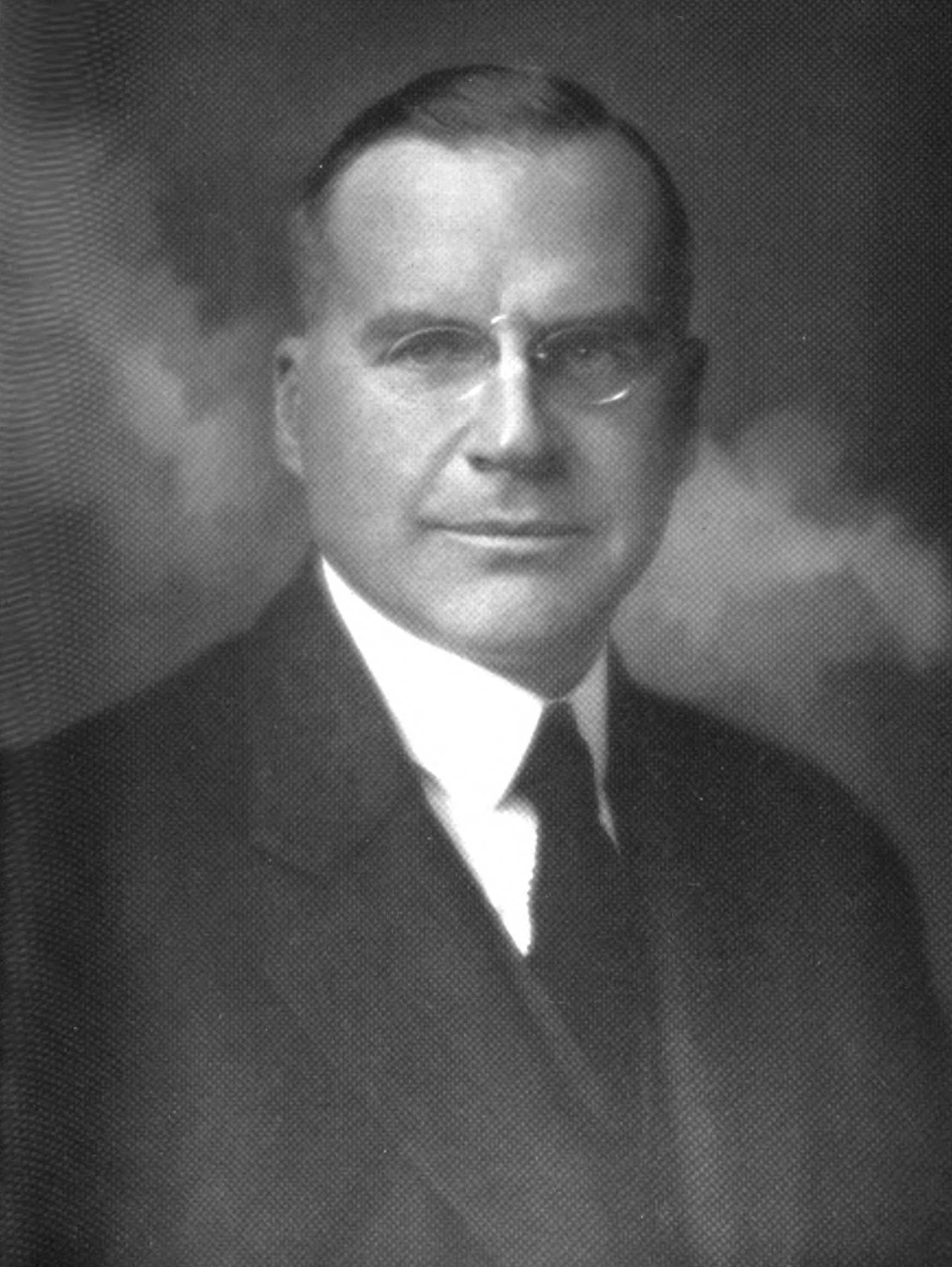
Paul Hastings Allen

Paul Hastings Allen (28 November 1883 in Boston, Massachusetts – 28 September 1952 in Boston, Massachusetts) was an American composer.

== Life ==
He was born in Hyde Park, a neighborhood of Boston, After being graduated from Harvard College (A. B., 1903), he went to Florence, Italy, where he studied composition with Antonio Scontrino and piano with Giuseppe Buonamici. During World War I, he served in the U.S. diplomatic service. After returning to Boston in 1920, he remained for the rest of his life. He was a prolific composer of operas, symphonies, chamber, and vocal music. He wrote an opera based on The Last of the Mohicans by James Fenimore Cooper. He was awarded a Paderewski Prize for his symphony entitled Pilgrim. Though dated 1909, the prize was awarded in January 1910. Many of his works are in the library at Harvard University.

== Works ==
=== Operas ===
- The Monastery (1911)
- It filtro (Genoa, October 26, 1912)
- Milda (Venice, June 14, 1913)
- L'ultimo dei Mohicani (Florence, February 24, 1916)
- Cleopatra (1921)
- La piccolo Figaro (1931)
- I fiori
- The Amaranths

=== Symphonies ===
- Symphony No. 1 in G, Al Mare
- Symphony No. 2 in C, Cosmopolitan
- Symphony No. 3 in E, Liberty
- Symphony No. 4 in A, Lyra
- Symphony No. 5 in E, Phoebus
- Symphony No. 6 in D, Pilgrim (received the Paderewski Prize, 1909)
- Symphony No. 7 in E-flat, Somerset
- Symphony No. 8 in D, Utopia.
