= Jeffrey Swann =

American classical pianist

Jeffrey Swann (born November 24, 1951) is an American classical pianist.

Swann was born in Arizona but moved to Dallas, Texas, as a young child. He began piano studies at the age of four. While attending St. Mark's School of Texas, he studied for seven years with Alexander Uninsky at Southern Methodist University in Dallas. (He was known at St. Mark's for practicing without shoes - socks only.) He received his Bachelor and Master of Music degrees from the Juilliard School under Beveridge Webster and Joseph Bloch. He completed his Doctor of Musical Arts degree under Adele Marcus, graduating with highest honors. During this time, he won the Young Concert Artists International Auditions in 1974 and opened the 1975–76 YCA Series at Carnegie Hall with his New York debut.

He won first prize in the Dino Ciani Competition sponsored by La Scala in Milan, second prize at the Queen Elisabeth Music Competition in Brussels, and top honors in the Warsaw Chopin, Van Cliburn, Vianna da Motta and Montreal Competitions.

== Career ==
Swann has performed internationally in the United States, Europe, Latin America, and Asia. He has appeared as a soloist with numerous orchestras in North America and Europe and has presented lecture-recitals internationally. He has also served as a juror for piano competitions, including the Premio Venezia in Italy.

Among his festival appearances is the International Keyboard Institute & Festival, presented by the Kaufman Music Center in New York.
