= Bass trumpet =

Lowest-pitched instrument in the trumpet family

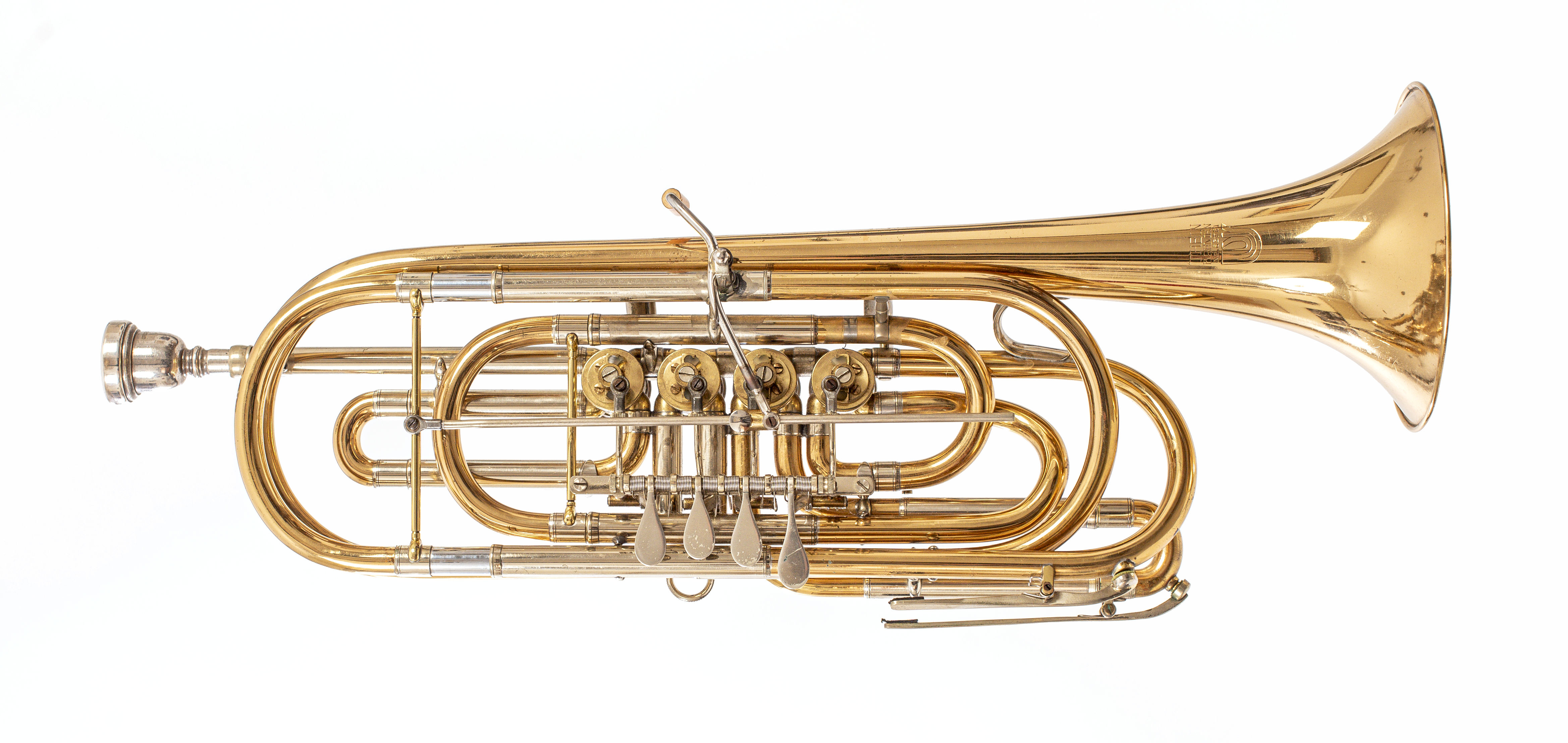
- Bass trumpet in C with 4 rotary valves

Brass instrument
- Classification: Wind; Brass; Aerophone
- Hornbostel–Sachs classification: 423.233.2 (Valved aerophone sounded by lip vibration with cylindrical bore longer than 2 metres)
- Developed: Early 19th century

Related instruments
- Trumpet; Contrabass trumpet; Valve trombone

Musicians
- Willie Colón; Philip Jones; Johnny Mandel; Elliot Mason; Leonhard Paul; Raymond Premru; Rashawn Ross; Cy Touff

Builders
- Alexander; Bach; Getzen; Schagerl; Thein

The bass trumpet is a type of low trumpet which was first developed during the 1820s in Germany. It is usually pitched in 8' C or 9' B♭ today, but is sometimes built in E♭ and is treated as a transposing instrument sounding either an octave, a sixth or a ninth lower than written, depending on the pitch of the instrument. Having valves and the same tubing length, the bass trumpet is quite similar to the valve trombone, although the bass trumpet has a harder, more metallic tone. Certain modern manufacturers that sell 'valve trombones' and 'bass trumpets' employ the same tubing, valves, and bell in different combinations; in these circumstances, the bass trumpet is nearly similar to the valve trombone.

== History ==
The earliest mention of the bass trumpet is in the 1821 Allgemeine Musikalische Zeitung, in which Heinrich Stölzel's Chromatische Tenor-Trompetenbaß and Griesling & Schlott's Chromatische Trompetenbaß are described. Several other variants were produced through the 1820s and were employed in military bands. Wide-bell versions in 9' B♭ are still used today in Austria and Bavaria under the name Baßtrompete, and narrow-bell versions in 9' B♭ are used in Italy under the name tromba bassa. They perform no melodic function, but are used solely to fill out harmonies.

=== Wagner's bass trumpet ===
Richard Wagner's first intention for Der Ring des Nibelungen was a bass trumpet in 13' E♭, based on the instruments he would have come across during his dealings with military bands. However, while the opening section of Das Rheingold might indicate the use of such an instrument, the part quickly rises to G♭5, which would be the nineteenth partial on this long instrument; Wagner understood brass instruments very well and saw that this was impractical. While it was argued during the late nineteenth century (Oskar Franz: Zeitschrift für Instrumentenbau, 1884) that the instrument in question was actually pitched an octave higher, the instrument actually built by Moritz of Berlin on Wagner's personal instruction for the Munich theatre (according to Zeitschrift für Instrumentenbau, 1908) was pitched in 8' C with crooks for B♭ and A and sounded one octave lower than written. The records of Moritz were not preserved, though a wide-bell bass trumpet with military-band proportions in 8' C with B♭ and A crooks does make an appearance in their post-1900 catalogue, while Gebrüder Alexander of Mainz offered a narrow-bore model in either E♭ or C.

The model normally used today is in 8' C with four rotary valves, and is played by a trombonist owing to the size of the mouthpiece. Bass trumpets in E♭ are usually played by trumpeters as the mouthpiece is closer in size to that of the standard B♭ trumpet.

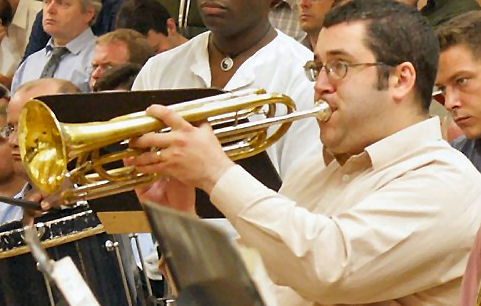
Duncan Wilson playing rotary bass trumpet in C with the BBC Symphony Orchestra

Wagner wrote for his new addition to the brass section, exploiting open and muted effects, and extremes of range and dynamics. The bass trumpet is frequently featured in Der Ring des Nibelungen, playing solos in every register, as well as playing in octaves, unison, or harmony with trumpets, trombones, and Wagner tubas. Its distinctive timbre is identifiable within the orchestral texture and Wagner made frequent use of this tone colour. However, as with the Wagner tuba and the contrabass trombone, Wagner's other additions to the opera house orchestra for Der Ring des Nibelungen, the bass trumpet has not become a regular member of the orchestral brass and is used relatively infrequently.

Other composers who have used the bass trumpet in the orchestra include Richard Strauss (in the tone poem Macbeth and the opera Elektra), Arnold Schoenberg (in the cantata Gurrelieder), Igor Stravinsky (in the ballet Le sacre du printemps – fourth trumpet doubling bass trumpet in E♭), and Leoš Janáček (in the Sinfonietta – two bass trumpets in B♭). György Ligeti used the bass trumpet as one of Nekrotzar's "Entourage" instruments in his opera Le Grand Macabre.

== Notation ==
The bass trumpet is usually notated in the treble clef. The bass trumpet in C sounds one octave lower than written, the bass trumpet in E♭ sounds a major sixth lower than written, and the bass trumpet in B♭ sounds a major ninth lower than written. Wagner's transpositions include bass trumpet in E, E♭, D, C, and B♭, though players often have parts for the bass trumpet transposed into C to play on the C bass trumpet.

== Performers ==
In jazz, Johnny Mandel became well known as a bass trumpet player, as well as Cy Touff and Raymond Premru in the 1950s and 1960s. The jazz trombonist Elliot Mason regularly plays the bass trumpet with Wynton Marsalis's Jazz at Lincoln Center Orchestra as well as in his own bands. Rashawn Ross regularly plays bass trumpet with the Dave Matthews Band, and in other groups and recordings. He plays both a silver-plated Getzen bass trumpet and a Mount Vernon era Bach B♭ trumpet. The Chicago-based bass trumpet player Ryan Shultz also plays a Getzen bass trumpet, recording and performing in the progressive jazz scene in Chicago since the 1980s.

The salsa musician and trombonist Willie Colón (1950 – 2026) played a Getzen bass trumpet on several recordings on Fania Records.

While the bass trumpet in classical music is usually played by a trombonist, the British trumpeter Philip Jones performed on the bass trumpet while employed by the Royal Opera House, Covent Garden. Leonhard Paul plays bass trumpet regularly with the Austrian brass ensemble Mnozil Brass. Up until late 2006, he played a traditional rotary valve bass trumpet made by Gebr. Alexander, but now plays a redesigned instrument by the Austrian maker Schagerl.

== See also ==
Other trumpets:

- Piccolo trumpet
- Contrabass trumpet
- Pocket trumpet
