= Gardner Read =

American composer

Gardner Read (January 2, 1913 in Evanston, Illinois – November 10, 2005 in Manchester-by-the-Sea, Massachusetts) was an American composer and musical scholar.

His first musical studies were in piano and organ, and he also took lessons in counterpoint and composition at the School of Music at Northwestern University. In 1932, he was awarded a four-year scholarship to the Eastman School of Music (B.M. and M.M.), where he studied with Bernard Rogers and Howard Hanson. In the late 1930s, he also studied briefly with Ildebrando Pizzetti, and Aaron Copland.

After heading the composition departments of the St. Louis Institute of Music, the Kansas City Conservatory of Music, and the Cleveland Institute of Music, Read became Composer-in-Residence and Professor of Composition at the School of Music at Boston University. He remained in this post until his retirement in 1978.

His Symphony No. 1, op. 30 (1937, premiered by Sir John Barbirolli) won first prize at the New York Philharmonic-Symphony Society's American Composers' Contest, while his second symphony (op. 45, 1943) won first prize in the Paderewski Fund Competition. Another first prize came in the 1986 National Association of Teachers of Singing Art Song Competition, won by his Nocturnal Visions, op. 145. He wrote one opera, Villon, in 1967.

His book Music Notation: A Manual of Modern Practice (1969/1979) attempted to catalogue the rapidly changing landscape of notation for contemporary western art music.

== Bibliography ==
- Dodd, Mary Ann, and Jayson Rod Engquist (1996). Gardner Read: A Bio-Bibliography. Greenwood Press. ISBN 0-313-29384-8. (Contains a complete list of his compositions.)
- Read, Gardner (1953, rev. 1969). Thesaurus of Orchestral Devices. Pittman Publishing Corp. ISBN 0837118840
- -- (1964, rev. 1972). Music Notation: A Manual of Modern Practice. Crescendo Publishing, (1964, 1972); Taplinger Publishing Company (1979, 2nd edition). ISBN 0800854535
- -- (1975, 1993). Contemporary Instrumental Techniques. Schirmer Books, 1975. ISBN 0028721004. Revised as Compendium of Modern Instrumental Techniques. Greenwood Press, 1993. ISBN 0313285128
- -- (1978). Modern Rhythmic Notation. Indiana University Press. ISBN 0253338670
- -- (1979). Style and Orchestration. Schirmer Books/MacMillan Publishing Company, 1979. ISBN 0028721101
- -- (1987). Source Book of Proposed Music Notation Reforms. Greenwood Press. ISBN 031325446X
- -- (1990). Twentieth Century Microtonal Notation. Greenwood Press. ISBN 0313273987
- -- (1998). Pictographic Score Notation. Greenwood Press. ISBN 0313304696
- -- (2004). Orchestral Combinations: The Science and Art of Instrumental Tone Color. Scarecrow Press, Inc. ISBN 0810848147
