= Joseph Bloch =

American musician (1917–2009)

Joseph Meyer Bloch (pronounced "block", November 6, 1917 – March 4, 2009) was an American concert pianist and professor of piano literature at the Juilliard School in New York City. During a career at Juilliard that spanned five decades, Bloch's students included Emanuel Ax, Van Cliburn, Misha Dichter, Garrick Ohlsson, Jeffrey Siegel, Şahan Arzruni, and Jeffrey Swann. During his time at the school, with the exception of an attempted retirement in the 1980s, Bloch taught every piano student at Juilliard. While other Juilliard piano instructors taught prowess at the keyboard, Bloch focused on what The New York Times described as "the who, the why and the what-if" of the piano, not "the how-to". For one year, 1995–96, Mr. Bloch co-taught the Juilliard piano literature courses with Bruce Brubaker. After Mr. Bloch's retirement in 1996, Brubaker continued teaching the piano literature courses at Juilliard for nine years.

Bloch was born on November 6, 1917, in Indianapolis, Indiana. He attended Chicago Musical College, where he was awarded a bachelor's degree and later attended Harvard University, where he earned a master's degree in musicology. His education was interrupted by his service in the United States Army Air Forces during World War II, where he was stationed in Guam. While serving in the army Air Forces, he was stationed at Lowry Field in Denver, Colorado and became a captain.

Bloch was a National Patron of Delta Omicron, an international professional music fraternity.

Bloch died at 91 on March 4, 2009, due to a heart attack at his home in Larchmont, New York.
