= Normand Lockwood =

American classical composer

Normand Lockwood (March 19, 1906 – March 9, 2002) was an American composer born in New York, New York. He studied composition at the University of Michigan from 1921 to 1924, and then traveled to Rome and studied composition under Ottorino Respighi from 1925 to 1926, and during this time he also had composition lessons with Nadia Boulanger in Paris. He won a Prix de Rome in 1929 that allowed him to continue his work in Rome. He was a National Patron of Delta Omicron, an international professional music fraternity.

== Professorships ==
Lockwood returned to America in 1932, becoming an associate professor of composition and theory at Oberlin Conservatory, and won Guggenheim Fellowships in both 1943 and 1944. He taught at Columbia University and the Sacred School of Music from 1945 to 1953, Trinity University (Texas) from 1953 to 1955, University of Wyoming from 1955 to 1957, University of Oregon from 1957 to 1959, and University of Hawaii from 1960 to 1961. He was Composer-in-Residence at the University of Denver, Colorado from 1961 until becoming Professor Emeritus in 1974. He died in Denver, Colorado on March 9, 2002, ten days short of his 96th birthday.

== Important works ==
Lockwood composed works in many forms, but he was most well known for his choral works, which were mostly based on religious texts. He also composed operas, orchestral symphonies and suites, and instrumental and vocal chamber music.

=== Choral ===
- The Birth of Moses, 1947
- The Closing Doxology, 1952
- Prairie (setting of Carl Sandburg writings), 1953

=== Opera ===
- The Scarecrow (1945)
- Early Dawn (1961)
- Wizards of Balizar, 1962
- The Hanging Judge, 1964
- Requiem for a Rich Young Man, 1964

=== Orchestral ===
- Symphony (1941)
- Concerto for organ, trumpets (2), trombones (2) (1951)

=== Chamber ===
- Trio (flute, viola and harp). 1939
- String Quartet No.3 (published 1948)
- To Margarita Debayle (voice and piano), 1977
- Trio (violin, cello, and piano), 1984
- Psalms 17 & 114 (mezzo-soprano and organ), 1985

== The Normand Lockwood Collection ==
The Normand Lockwood Collection is located in the American Music Research Center archives of the University of Colorado at Boulder and contains materials dated from 1921 to 1996. The collection size is 112 linear feet, and it contains many of his original scores, personal records, correspondence, student compositions, and audio recordings.
