= Antoine Beaussant =

French musician

Antoine Beaussant (French pronunciation: [ɑ̃twan bosɑ̃]; born 1957), is a French entrepreneur, businessman and oboist. He was President of Buffet Crampon since November 2007 and was replaced in July 2014 by Jérôme Perrod.

Antoine Beaussant completed a science Baccalauréat in 1974, at the age of 16. He graduated from Ecole de Hautes Etudes Commerciales du Nord (EDHEC) in Lille and from Institut Européen d'Administration des Affaires (Insead), where he followed the European Marketing Program.

He began his professional career in the field of new technologies and the media, first as Head of Multimedia at French newspaper Le Monde and then at Amaury, publisher of Le Parisien and L'Équipe.

As an internet pioneer in France, he launched, ran and invested in a number of start-ups between 1994 and 2002. In 1999, he founded Nart, the web’s first art auction site, before going on to buy L’Œil and Le Journal des Arts.

From 2002 to 2005 he was deputy CEO of Capgemini Sogeti, an IT company with some 15,000 employees, and from 2005 to 2006 he was deputy CEO of ESR, an IT service provider listed on the Paris stock exchange.

He combined his managing director roles with membership of the Conseil Supérieur de la Télématique, the administrative body responsible for regulating the ICT sector, a role to which he was appointed in 1992 by the French Minister for Industry and which he performed until 2000. In 1996, the government appointed him to produce a white paper on internet regulation in France, resulting in publication of the Charte de l’Internet (internet charter). From 2001 to 2008 he was a member of the Conseil des Ventes Volontaires, France’s auctioneering regulator. He is currently chairman of the Conseil de développement de la Communauté d'agglomération de Mantes-en-Yvelines, an urban planning agency in the Paris area.

In 2005, Beaussant, who is a keen oboist, joined the Supervisory Board of Buffet Crampon, Europe’s leading wind instrument manufacturer since its takeover by the Argos Soditic investment fund. He took control of the group in November 2007, a move which enabled him to combine his experience as a manager with his passion for music in the service of the great French professional musical instrument manufacturing tradition. Buffet Crampon was created in 1825, and with some 750 employees based in France, Germany, the United States, Japan and China, today turns over around €67 million, of which 94% outside France. It manufactures some 60,000 musical instruments every year under the Buffet Crampon, Besson, B&S, Antoine Courtois, Hans Hoyer, J. Keilwerth, Meinl Weston, Scherzer and W. Schreiber brands.

In 2004, Antoine Beaussant was made Chevalier de la Légion d’Honneur by the French prime minister.

In 2011 Antoine Beaussant was appointed vice-president of CSFI (Association of Instrument Manufacturers), of the European Association et de la Chambre syndicale Allemande (German Association).

== Personal life ==
Antoine Beaussant comes from an artistic and learned family. His grandfather Charles-Gustave Beaussant was an entrepreneur and music lover who graduated from HEC in 1923. His father Philippe Beaussant, was a writer, baroque music expert and member of the Académie française.
