= Igor Krivokapič =

Slovenian composer, tubist and instrument inventor

Igor Krivokapič (born 10 November 1965 in Ljubljana) is a Slovenian composer, retired tubist and instrument inventor.

== Life and work ==
Igor Krivokapič first studied tuba at the Academy of Music in Ljubljana. He then continued his studies at the New England Conservatory of Music in Boston under Toby Hanks (tuba), Caleb Morgan (electronic composition), Bob Ceely (classical composition) and Malcolm Peyton (orchestration). After his studies Igor Krivokapič was first appointed solo tubist at the RTV Slovenia Symphony Orchestra from 1985 to 1995. He was forced to quit tuba playing due to consequences of a car accident in 1995. He then worked as an editor for classical music at the Slovenian Radio from 1996 to 1999. From 1999 to 2009 he was a free lance composer. Since 2009 Igor Krivokapič is professor for tuba and chamber music at the Conservatory for Music and Ballet in Ljubljana and also teaches partly at the Academy of Music in the same city.

In the early 2000s Igor Krivokapič invented a new family of instruments based on the tuba which consists of 6 instruments of different sizes. They are called the New Helicons and first examples were produced by the German instrument manufacturer Meinl-Weston. Performances with these New Helicons were given at meetings of the International Tuba Euphonium Association in 2004 (Budapest), 2008 (Cincinnati) and 2014 (Bloomington). Professional performances have been also given at several music festivals in Europe and North America.

As a composer Igor Krivokapič was delegate at the UNESCO International Rostrum of Composers in 1996 and 1997. And he was awarded twice for his compositions at the Concorso Internazionale per Giovani Strumentisti in Povoletto (Italy) in 2000 and 2001. The compositions by Igor Krivokapič are published through Edicije DSS, Sloway music editions, Edition Reift, Edizioni Musicali Wicky, HoneyRock Publishing, Saxtet Publications and ITEA Publications.

== Compositions ==
=== Orchestral music ===
- Structures for chamber orchestra (1990)
- Concerto for electric violin and orchestra (1993/2019)
- Symphony No.1 (1999/2000)
- Symphony No.2 (2004/2005)
- Poco triste for chamber orchestra (2007)
- Symphony No.3 (2009)
- Symphony No.4 (2010)
- Concerto for piccolo and string orchestra, piano, harp, celesta and percussion (2012/2013)
- Imaginarni plesi (Imaginary dances) for bassoon (or contrabass helicon) and orchestra (2016)
- Concerto for tenor helicon and concert band (2018/2019)
- Symphony No. 5, Sedem trobent Apokalipse (2021?)

=== Band and brass music ===
- Kaša, suite for traditional wind band (1999)
- Rondo fresco for concert band (2004)
- Razprava o občutljivosti (A Treatise on Sensibility) for concert band (2009)
- Korakoma (Marziale) for larger ensemble of symphonic brass winds and snare drum (2013)

=== Chamber music ===
- Eclogue for cello solo (1989)
- Modifikacije for 2 horns in F and bass tuba in F (1989)
- Melos for flute solo (1993)
- Asociacije for 5-string double bass (or bass saxophone), electric piano and four percussion instruments (1994)
- Sonata for cello and piano (1994/1995)
- Genesis for clarinet quartet (1994/1995)
- Radosti (Joys) for oboe, viola and piano (1996-1998)
- Epika for cylindrical brass quintet (small trumpet in E-flat, trumpet in B-flat, alto, tenor and contrabass trombone) (1998)
- Suite for guitar solo (1999/2000)
- Zvočne pripovedi ozarjenega večera (Sonic Tales of the Transfigured Evening) for English horn and harp (2000)
- Mala rapsodija for alto saxophone and piano (2000)
- Rapsodija for bass tuba or cimbasso in F and piano (2000)
- Capriccio for small clarinet in E-flat and harp (2001)
- Drobižki (Mignons) for flute, violin and harpsichord (2001)
- Jesenske povedi (Autumn narratives) for flute, viola and harp (2001)
- Tri za tri (Three for Three) for piccolo, bassoon and piano (2001/2002)
- Suita Barboletta for flute and piano (2002)
- Sonata for flute and piano (2002)
- Rhapsody for cimbasso and piano (2003), commissioned by Mihael Švagan
- Štirje prebliski (Four ideas) for piccolo and piano (2004)
- Veseli rondino (Gay rondino) for bass helicon and piano (2004)
- Woodwind trio for flute, clarinet and bassoon (2004/2005)
- Clarinet sextet for small clarinet in E-flat, two clarinets in B-flat, alto clarinet, bass clarinet and contrabass clarinet (2006)
- Milina for soprillo (piccolo saxophone in B-flat) and harp (2006)
- Melos 2 for soprano helicon (2007)
- Sonata for horn and piano (2008)
- Trije nokturni (Three nocturnos) for piano solo (2008/2009)
- Rosna žalostinka (Weeping lament) for piccolo and harp (2009)
- Zasanjanost (Reverie) for flute and piano (2011)
- Imaginari plesi (Imaginary dances) for bassoon (or contrabass helicon) and piano (2012)
- Zvočne krajine (Soundscapes) for piccolo, flute, alto flute and bass flute (2013)
- Mladostni trio (Juvenile trio) for soprano helicon, tenor helicon and piano (2014)
- Alkimije (Alchemies) for violin, flute, tenor helicon, accordion and percussion ensemble (2018)
- Elementi besa (Elements of fury) for solo accordion (2019)

=== Electroacoustic and tape music ===
- The unstable state of stability for tape (1989)
- Mir for bass flute, tape and three narrators (1989/1990)
- Mrak/Solze for tape (1990)
- Idyll for tape (1991)

=== Vocal and choral music ===
- U’ Lublan Pr' Šestic, arrangement of a popular song for soprano, flute and guitar (1998)
- Sama for eight voices (1990)
- Posvetilo for four-voiced mixed choir (1991)
- Večerna pesem for four-voiced male choir (1992)
- Od zibke do groba for four-voiced male choir (2000)
- Makov cvet for lyric baritone and piano on a poem by Ivan Minatti (2015)
- Tvoja roža for basso cantante and piano on a poem by Ivan Minatti (2015)
- La Luna for soprano and piano on a poem by Jorge Luis Borges (2017)
- Elogio de la Sombra for soprano and piano on a poem by Jorge Luis Borges (2017)

== Bibliography ==
- Igor Krivokapic: Introducing A New Helicon Family: Soprano Helicon, in: ITEA Journal, vol. 35:1, fall 2007
