= Getzen =

American instrument manufacturing company

Getzen Company
- Company type: Private
- Industry: Brass instruments
- Founded: 1939
- Founder: T. J. Getzen
- Headquarters: Elkhorn, Wisconsin, United States
- Number of locations: 1
- Area served: Worldwide
- Products: Trumpets, cornets, flugelhorns, trombones
- Subsidiaries: Edwards Instrument Company
- Website: www.getzen.com

The Getzen Company is a family-owned manufacturer and wholesaler of brass instruments. The present product portfolio consists of trumpets, cornets, flugelhorns, trombones, and a baritone horn. Four generations of the Getzen family have participated in the company. Most Getzen instruments are rated well by consumers, and it is well known for its custom line of Edwards trumpets and trombones.

== History ==
=== Founding ===
In 1939, Anthony James (T.J.) Getzen founded the Getzen Company, in Elkhorn, Wisconsin. Getzen had trained in instrument repair with the C.G. Conn company and worked as a plant superintendent for the Frank Holton Company. Initially opened as a repair shop, the company expanded after World War II to instrument manufacture. In 1946, Getzen produced its first trombones. In 1947, Getzen started producing trumpets and cornets as well. In 1949, J. Robert Getzen, T.J.'s son, assumed the position of plant superintendent, and Getzen started to produce piston bugles. These bugles became popular with Drum and Bugle Corps.

=== Expansion and sale ===
In 1959, J. Robert Getzen left the company to found Allied Music. His brother Donald Getzen briefly assumed the leadership of the company in 1960 and acquired control of the Hoosier Band Instrument Company. Late in 1960, the family sold the company to attorney Harold M. Knowlton. No longer a family-owned business, the company continued to follow the same business model, expanding its visibility through an association with trumpeter Carl “Doc” Severinsen of The Tonight Show fame. In addition to the marketing aspect, this association also produced the Getzen 900 Severinsen Model Eterna trumpet. Producing both student and professional lines, the Getzen company was preparing to expand in October 1963 when the existing facility was destroyed by fire. The new factory opened in February 1964 with only a brief interruption in business. Founder T.J. Getzen died in 1968.

=== Modern family business ===
In 1985, Harold Knowlton sold Getzen to Charles F. Andrews, and the same year, J. Robert Getzen sold Allied Music to his sons Thomas and Edward. Edward concurrently founded Edwards Trombones. Charles Andrews lost control of the company in bankruptcy in 1991, and the Getzen brothers purchased the firm's assets. Transitioning Allied Music to the original role of the Getzen Company, instrument repair only, the family focused on the Getzen name for brass instrument manufacture with Edwards as a subsidiary. In 1999, Thomas Getzen bought out his brother to become sole owner of the Getzen Company. In 2003, J. Robert Getzen died. In 2009, two of Thomas Getzen's sons were working for the company maintaining the family business model under the leadership of their father.

== Products ==
The Getzen Company produces a line of trumpets including the professional level Genesis and Artist lines, the beginner level 300 and 400 series, the step-up line Capri and 700 series, and the semi-pro Eterna series. Additionally, the company builds two models of piccolo trumpet (Capri and Eterna), a herald trumpet, bass trumpet, and field trumpet. The instruments are particularly known for their reliable and durable piston valves. The company also produces cornets in the 300, 400, Capri, 700, Eterna, and Custom series. flugelhorns are available in the Capri, Eterna, and Custom series. Trombones are produced in the 300, 400, Capri, 700, Eterna, Custom, and Custom Reserve series. Getzen also builds one model of baritone horn.
