= Antoine Courtois =

French musical instrument makers

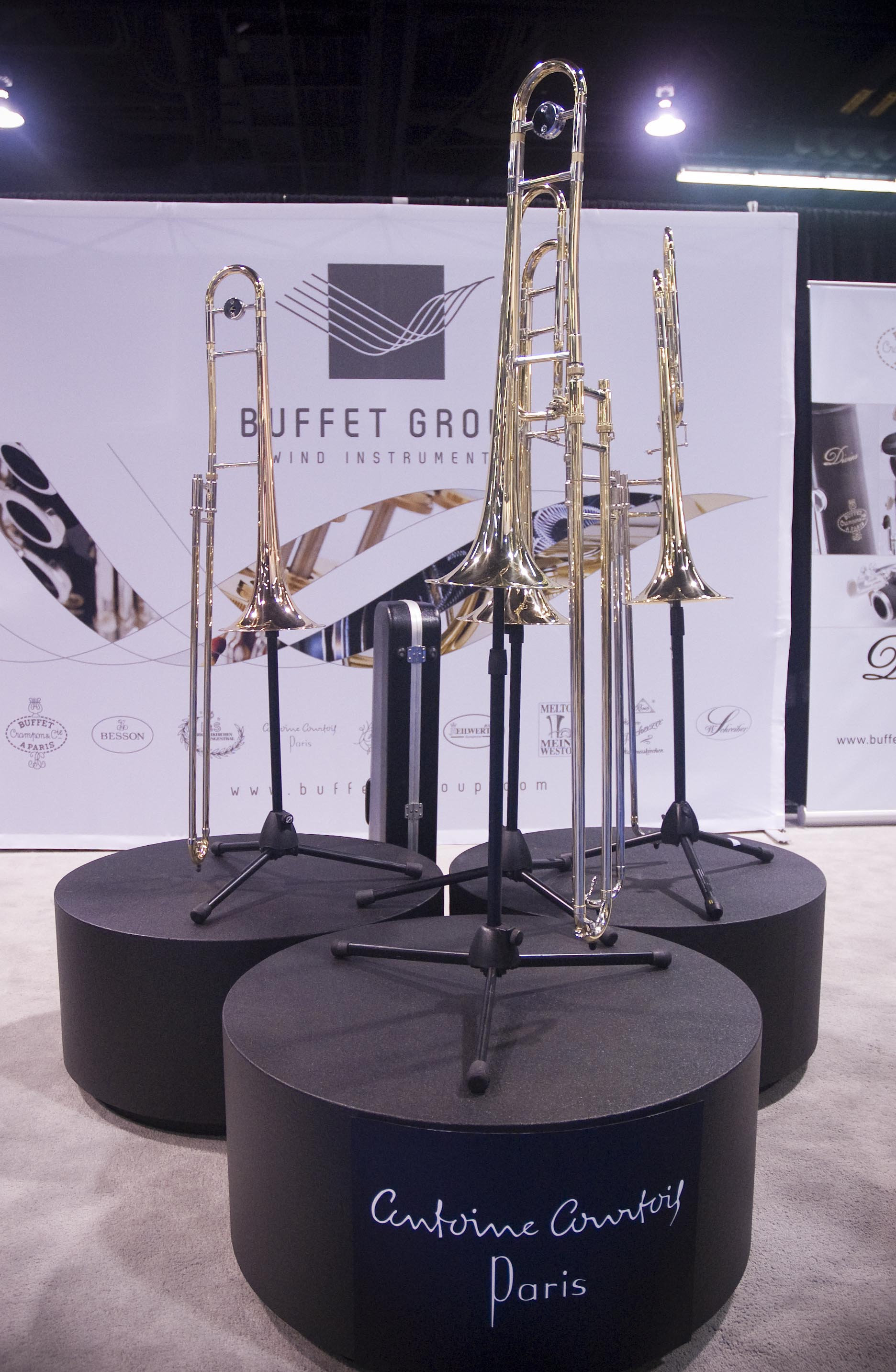
- Industry: manufacture of musical instruments
- Genre: Musical instrument manufacturers
- Founded: 1789
- Headquarters: Paris, France
- Website: a-courtois.com

The Antoine Courtois (French pronunciation: [ɑ̃twan kuʁtwa]) company, founded in Paris in 1789, is a manufacturer of brass musical instruments. The company's name comes from the name of the founder's children who created the brand name in 1803. The company has been a manufacturer of brass instruments ever since, particularly trumpet, cornet, saxhorn, flugelhorn and trombone. Today, Antoine Courtois is one of the brand names of Buffet Crampon Group, headed by Antoine Beaussant.

The cornetist Herbert L. Clarke was given a Courtois cornet on joining the Queens’s Own Regimental Band in Toronto in 1883, where he served intermittently as cornetist for nine years.
