= Lorna Cooke deVaron =

American conductor (1921–2018)

- Born: 17 January 1921
- Died: October 6, 2018 (aged 97)
- Education: Wellesley College; Radcliffe College
- Occupation: conductor

Lorna Cooke deVaron (January 17, 1921 – October 6, 2018) was an American choral conductor. She was one of the pre-eminent choral conductors of the 20th century, having given the world premiere or American premiere of many important works by Benjamin Britten, Leonard Bernstein, Samuel Barber, Aaron Copland, Irving Fine, Gunther Schuller, Daniel Pinkham, and others. DeVaron founded the New England Conservatory Chorus, which she directed from 1947 to 1988.

== Education ==
DeVaron studied at Wellesley College and Radcliffe College, where she assisted G. Wallace Woodworth in the direction of the Radcliffe Choral Society.

== Career ==
Subsequently, she became Assistant Professor of Music at Bryn Mawr College, whose choir she conducted. Her principal conducting teacher was Robert Shaw, with whom she studied at Tanglewood. In 1953, deVaron was appointed to the faculty of Tanglewood. There, she trained the Tanglewood Festival Chorus. She quickly became sought after as a choral conducting teacher to students from all over the world.

For 34 years deVaron prepared choruses for top orchestras, most notably the Boston Symphony Orchestra who collaborated regularly with the New England Conservatory Chorus prior to the formation of the Tanglewood Festival Chorus. Six of deVaron's recordings won the Grand Prix du Disque. She also received several nominations from the National Academy of Recording Arts.

In 1967, deVaron took the NEC Chorus on tour to the Soviet Union, as part of the Cultural Exchange Program, for which she received the Boston Medal for Distinguished Achievement. Several European tours with the Chorus followed. In 1978 she received the Medal for Distinguished Achievement from the Wellesley College Alumnae Association.

In the summer of 1977, the Israeli Government invited deVaron to conduct Kibbutz choirs and to lead a choral workshop in Israel. As a result, the following summer (1978), the government invited deVaron to return, this time with the NEC Chorus, where they participated in the 30th Anniversary celebration of the founding of Israel.

During the 1980s deVaron guest conducted the Cameron Singers in Israel and the Broadcasting Chorus of Beijing and conducted the NEC Chorus on concert tours to Romania, Bulgaria, and China.

== Retirement and honors ==
In 1988 deVaron retired as Chair of the Choral Department of New England Conservatory. Among her many honors include an Honorary Doctorate in Music from the New England Conservatory, the Harvard Glee Club Medal for Distinguished Service to Choral Music, and a citation from the American Choral Directors Association for Distinguished Service to Choral Music.

== Death ==
DeVaron died in October 2018 at the age of 97.
