= Geretsried =

- Town
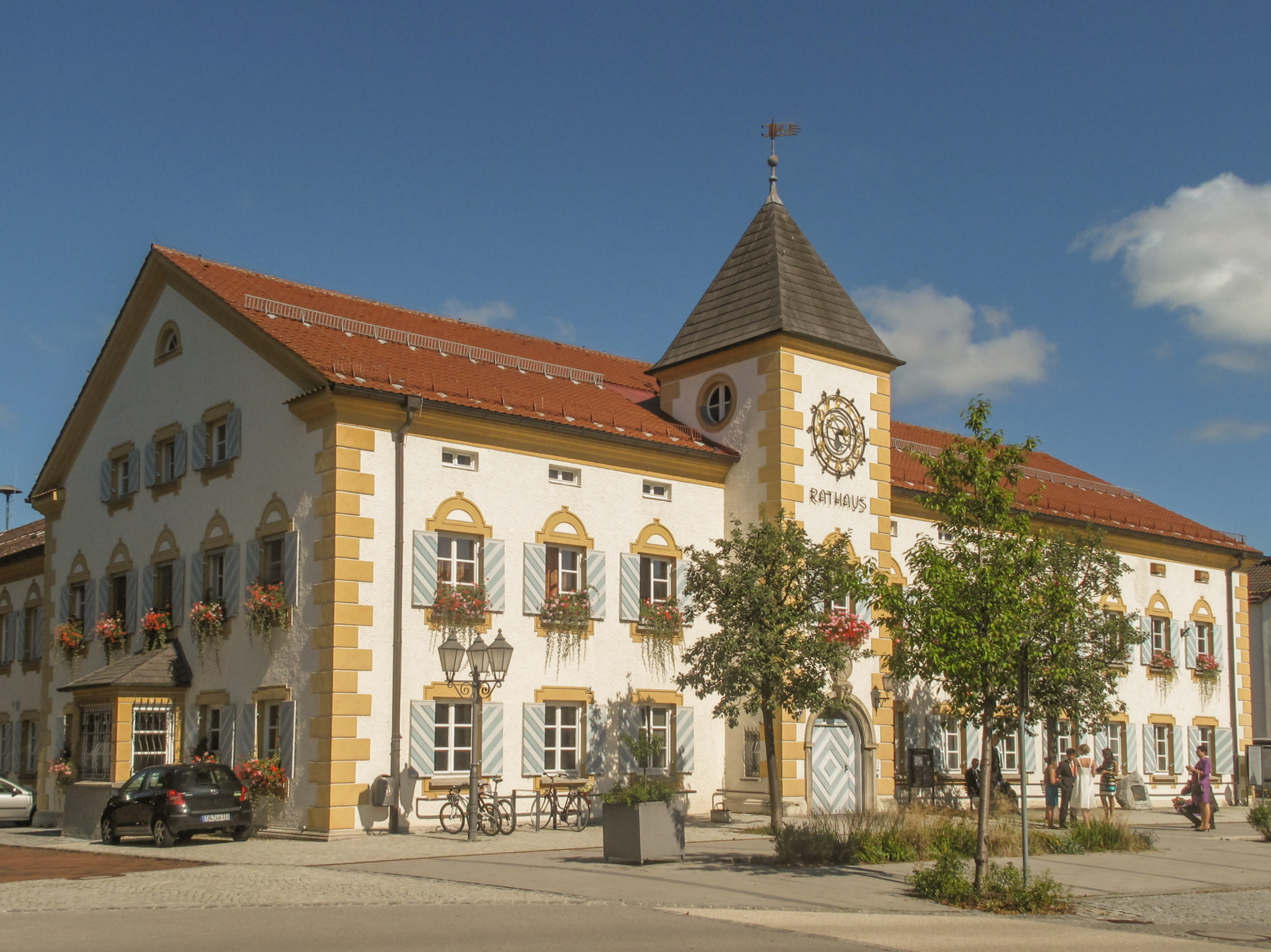
- Town hall

- Flag Coat of arms

- Location of Geretsried within Bad Tölz-Wolfratshausen district
- Interactive map of Geretsried
- Location within Germany Location within Bavaria
- Coordinates: 47°52′N 11°28′E
- Country: Germany
- State: Bavaria
- Admin. region: Upper Bavaria
- District: Bad Tölz-Wolfratshausen

Government
  - Mayor (2020–26): Michael Müller (CSU)

Area
  - Total: 24.6 km^{2} (9.5 sq mi)
- Elevation: 605 m (1,985 ft)

Population (2025-12-31)
  - Total: 25,907
  - Density: 1,050/km^{2} (2,730/sq mi)
- Time zone: UTC+01:00 (CET)
  - Summer (DST): UTC+02:00 (CEST)
- Postal codes: 82538
- Dialling codes: 08171
- Vehicle registration: TÖL, WOR
- Website: www.geretsried.de

Geretsried (German pronunciation: [ɡeːʁətsˈʁiːt]; Bavarian: Geretsriad) is a town in the district Bad Tölz-Wolfratshausen, located in Bavaria, Germany. The town is the most populated town in the district, with 23,219 inhabitants as of 31 December 2012.

The town is the site of a geothermal energy project using a novel closed-loop system that offers more environmental protection than conventional geothermal technologies. The project is a partnership between Eavor Technologies and Deep Energy Capital to produce sustainable zero carbon energy in Germany.

Geretsried in Bad Tölz-Wolfratshausen district

== History ==
Geretsried was first mentioned in the year 1083. In the early years it served a little more than a group of farms along the postal route between Munich and Innsbruck. It belonged to the city of Wolfratshausen.

In 1937 two munitions factories were built: "Dynamit Aktien Gesellschaft" and "Deutsche Sprengchemie", in the boroughs of what are today Gartenberg and Stein. Towards the end of the war, these factories employed slave and foreign labourers. Today, the remains of storage bunkers, administrative buildings, and other remains are scattered throughout the town. On April 9, 1945, The Eighth Air Force of the United States Army Air Forces bombed the factories.

In 1946, the empty bunkers and buildings were used to house German refugees from former ethnic German areas in Eastern Europe. In 1949, the citizens began to organize themselves and on April 1, 1950, the community of Geretsried came into being. On June 27, 1970, Geretsried got city rights.

== Gallery ==
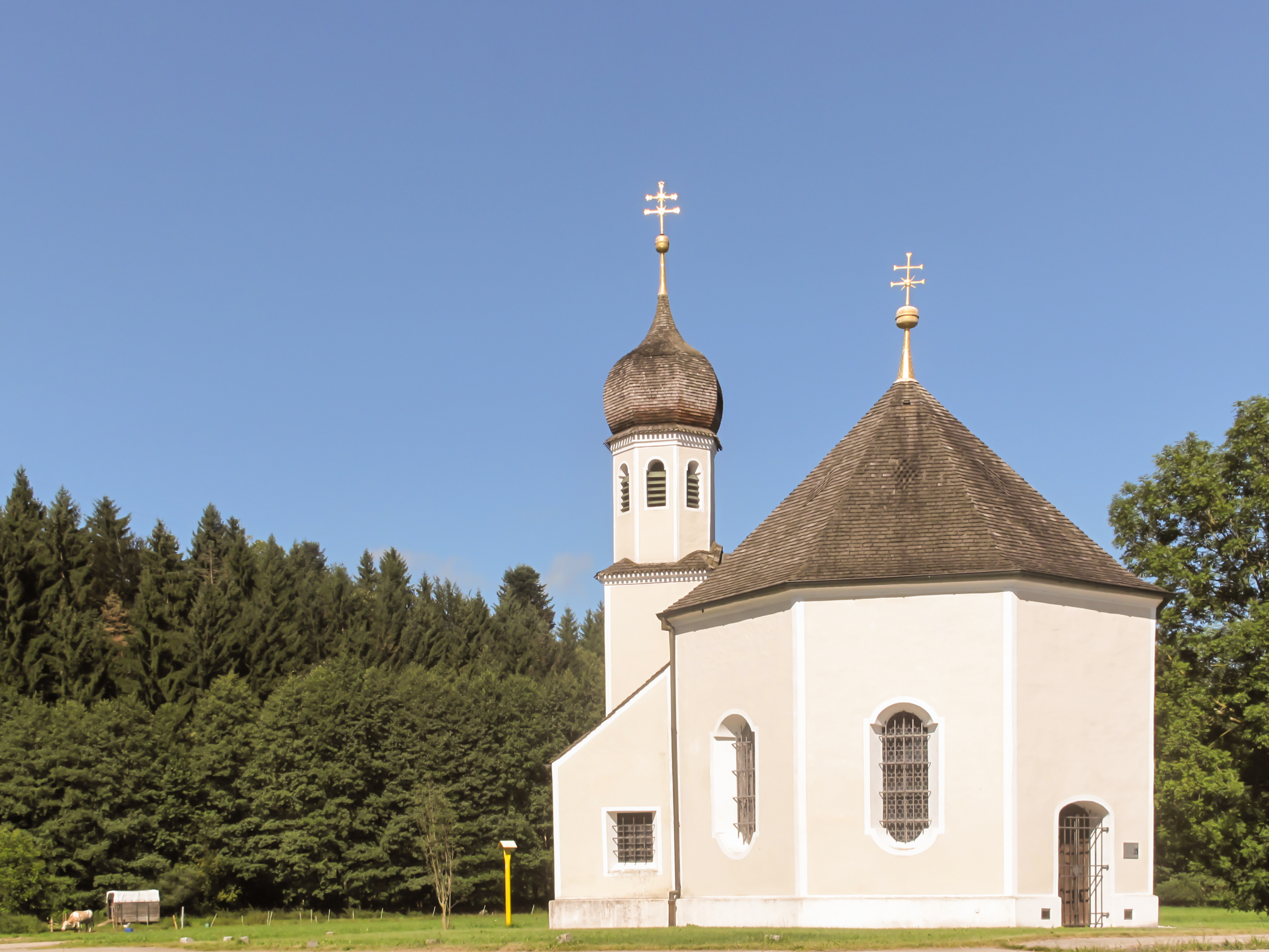
Geretsried, church: the Sankt Nikolaus Kirche

== Geography ==
Geretsried lies on the Isar River and includes the communities of Gartenberg, Gelting, and Stein. The Bundestrasse (federal highway) 11 runs by the city. The distance to Munich is approximately 35 kilometers.

=== Coat of arms ===
The cogwheel in the coat of arms symbolizes the local industry, the river symbolizes the Isar and the Conifer symbolizes the nature.

== Transport ==
The town belongs to the Munich public transportation zone. Regional buses connect the town to Wolfratshausen and Bad Tölz. An extension of the Munich S-Bahn line S7 is planned from Wolfratshausen to Geretsried.

== Economics ==
Various logistics companies have bases in Gelting, e.g. GLS, DPD, and DHL. Tyczka Totalgaz, DMG Mori AG, Speck Piston Pumps, Byk Gardner, Rudolf Chemie, Pulcra Chemicals, Loxxess Kontraktlogistik, and the Bauer Compressor Group are the largest employers in the city. The Geretsrieder sausage factory Sieber, once the purveyor to the royal Bavarian court, recently achieved a turnover of 25 million euros, but in 2016 after the discovery of listeria it had to stop production, recall and subsequently file for bankruptcy. The Franco Fresco company now produces frozen pizzas on the site.

== Twin towns – sister cities ==
Geretsried is twinned with:

- Chamalières, France

== Notable people ==
- Edmund Nick (1891–1974), composer, conductor and music writer
