= Carl Wilhelm Moritz =

German musical instrument maker

Carl Wilhelm Moritz (1810–1855) was a German musical instrument builder.

== Biography ==
Moritz was born in Berlin, the son of instrument builder Johann Gottfried Moritz, who had invented the five-valve Baß-Tuba together with Wilhelm Wieprecht. Carl Wilhelm took over his father's business when his father retired, five years before his death.

Wieprecht was a musical director for the royal military bands in Berlin, and in 1835 gave C. W. Moritz the task of producing baroque kettle drums and other military drums for the reforms of military music happening at the time. Moritz was able to design numerous improvements to these drums, including using thinner kettle walls than had previously been possible, and improved tuning keys. On 8 May 1838, a concert was given to celebrate a visit to Berlin by the Tsar Nicholas I of Russia, which featured over 1,000 musicians and 200 drummers, and used Moritz's drums.

Original timpani and drums built by Moritz are still kept in museums today. Carl Wilhelm Moritz also invented a number of new wind instruments, as his father. This included an early tenor tuba and bass bassoon.

After his death, his son Carl Albert Moritz continued the family business of instrument building, supplying Richard Wagner with instruments such as the bass trumpet, bass trombone and the construction of a "waldhorn tuba", the so-called Wagner tuba for performances of Der Ring des Nibelungen.

The Moritz family business continued operation in Berlin under the name "C. W. Moritz" until it finally closed in 1959, due to economic conditions after World War II. The business had operated continuously since 1808.
