= Emilie Mayer =

German composer (1812–1883)

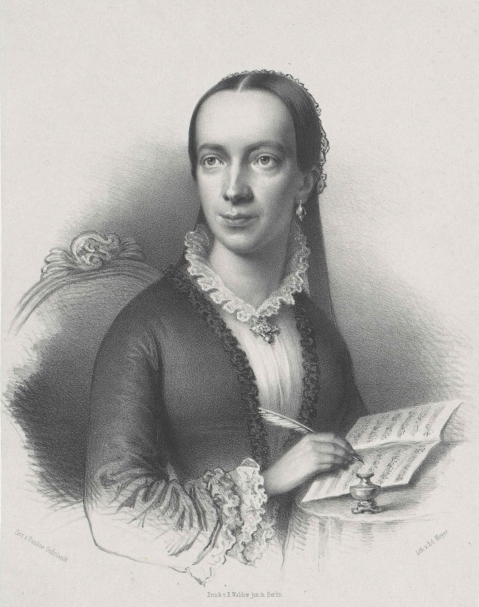
Lithograph of Mayer based on a drawing by Pauline Suhrlandt

Emilie Luise Frederica Mayer (14 May 1812 – 10 April 1883) was a German Romantic music composer who became one of the most prolific women to compose during the nineteenth century. Mayer composed eight symphonies and numerous chamber works, piano sonatas, and orchestral overtures. Despite the limited opportunities for women in professional music during her time, she achieved wide recognition and frequent public performance of her music across Germany. During her lifetime, her work was compared to that of Beethoven. In the twenty-first century, renewed interest in her work developed and her work has become celebrated again for its craftsmanship, originality, and contribution to the Romantic repertoire.

== Biography ==
=== Early life and career ===
Emilie Mayer was born in Friedland, Mecklenburg-Vorpommern, the third of five children and the eldest daughter of Henrietta Carolina and Johann August Friedrich Mayer, a wealthy pharmacist. Her mother died when Emilie was three years old. She started private music lessons at age five under the tutelage of Carl Heinrich Ernst Driver, an organist. At the same time, she began composing and submitting pieces of "free interpretation" to Driver. According to one of her surviving personal statements, "After a few lessons… I composed variations, dances, little rondos, etc." At the age of 28, her circumstances changed in 1840 when her father committed suicide - 26 years to the day after her mother was buried. Filled with devastation, Emilie consumed herself in her compositions. She became further disheartened when her mentor, Carl Driver died a few months later.

Mayer was encouraged to pursue music and composition by her family and her musical mentors, unlike many of her contemporaries. In nineteenth century Germany, women were expected to be "wife and mother", putting aside all other aspirations in favor of those of the household, regardless of status. While she did take up her late mother's role of caretaker of her father's household, she was never pressured to give up her musical aspirations nor was she ever pressured to marry. After the death of their father, her brothers further continued the encouragement for her to pursue composition. They accompanied her during her travels and financially supported her trips.

In 1841, at the age of thirty, she moved to the regional capital city of Stettin (now Szczecin, Poland) where she studied composition with Carl Loewe, a central figure in the musical life of the city who had been appointed "musical tsar" by the rising Prussian monarchy in 1821. The German writer Marie Silling claims that Loewe, after auditioning her, claimed "You actually know nothing and everything at the same time! I shall be the gardener who grows your talent from a bud to a beautiful flower". Her only singspiel, Die Fischerin, was a piano concerto collaboration with Loewe.

Loewe became one of the most important influences on the development of Mayer as a composer. Through his mentorship, Mayer became integrated into the musical culture of Stettin. Loewe established many concerts, education practices, and salons around the city in which Mayer and her compositions played a large role.

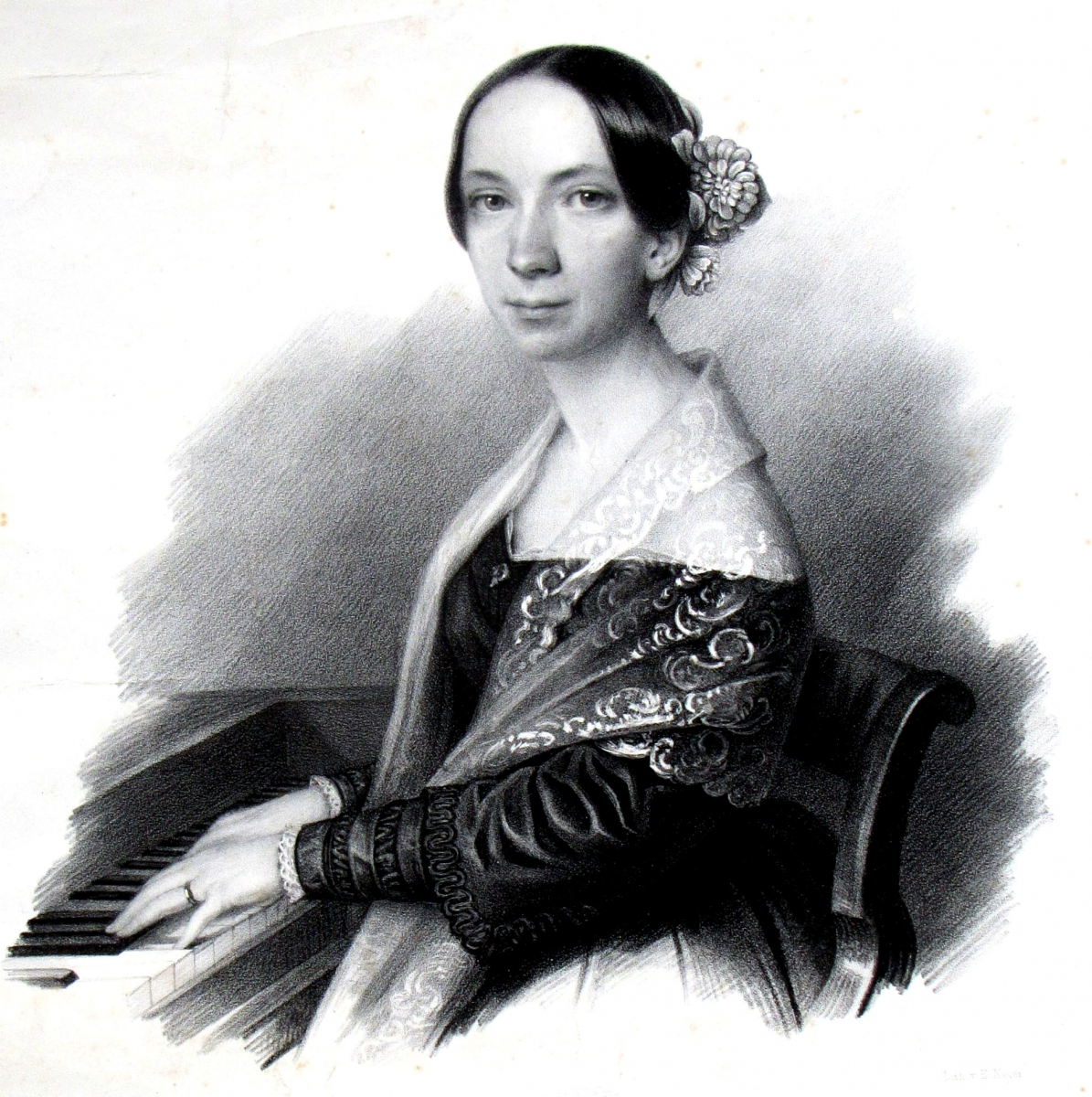
Emilie Mayer

=== Move to Berlin and professional success ===
After the premiere of her first two symphonies (C minor and E minor) by the Stettin Instrumental Society, in 1847 Loewe urged her to move to Berlin to continue her compositional studies. Once in Berlin, she studied fugue and double counterpoint with Adolf Bernhard Marx, and instrumentation with Wilhelm Friedrich Wieprecht.

She began publishing her works (e.g. Lieder op. 5-7, in 1848) that were performed in private concerts. Then, on 21 April 1850 at the Royal Theatre, Wilhelm Wieprecht led his "Euterpe" orchestra in a concert devoted to several Mayer compositions: a concert overture, a string quartet, a setting of Psalm 118 for chorus and orchestra, two symphonies, and some piano solos. Shortly after this performance, Mayer was awarded the gold medal of art from the Queen of Prussia, Elisabeth Ludovika of Bavaria. This success was especially significant because it was uncommon not only for a woman to be a composer in mid-nineteenth-century Europe, but also to have a large-scale orchestral concert devoted primarily to her compositions. Mayer's growing success in Berlin made her one of the few women of the period to gain recognition as a symphonic composer.

With critical and popular acclaim, she continued composing works for public performance. She traveled to attend performances of her works, including to the Königliches Schauspielhaus in Berlin, and to the performances of her compositions in cities such as Cologne, Munich, Lyon, Brussels, and Vienna.

=== Later years and death ===
After Carl Loewe died in 1869, the Loewe Society was formed. Mayer dedicated two of her cello sonatas to members of the society and their families. Her Op. 40 (1873) Cello Sonata is dedicated to the sister of composer Martin Plüddemann from Kolberg, and her Cello Sonata in D major, Op. 47 (1883), is dedicated to the Baron von Seckendorff from Stargard.

In 1876, Mayer returned to Berlin where her music was being performed frequently. Mayer's new Faust Overture, based on Goethe's Faust, was successful and she re-established herself as a significant figure in the city's cultural circles. She was an honorary member of the Philharmonic Society in Munich and was the co-chair of the Berlin Opera Academy.

=== Death and burial ===
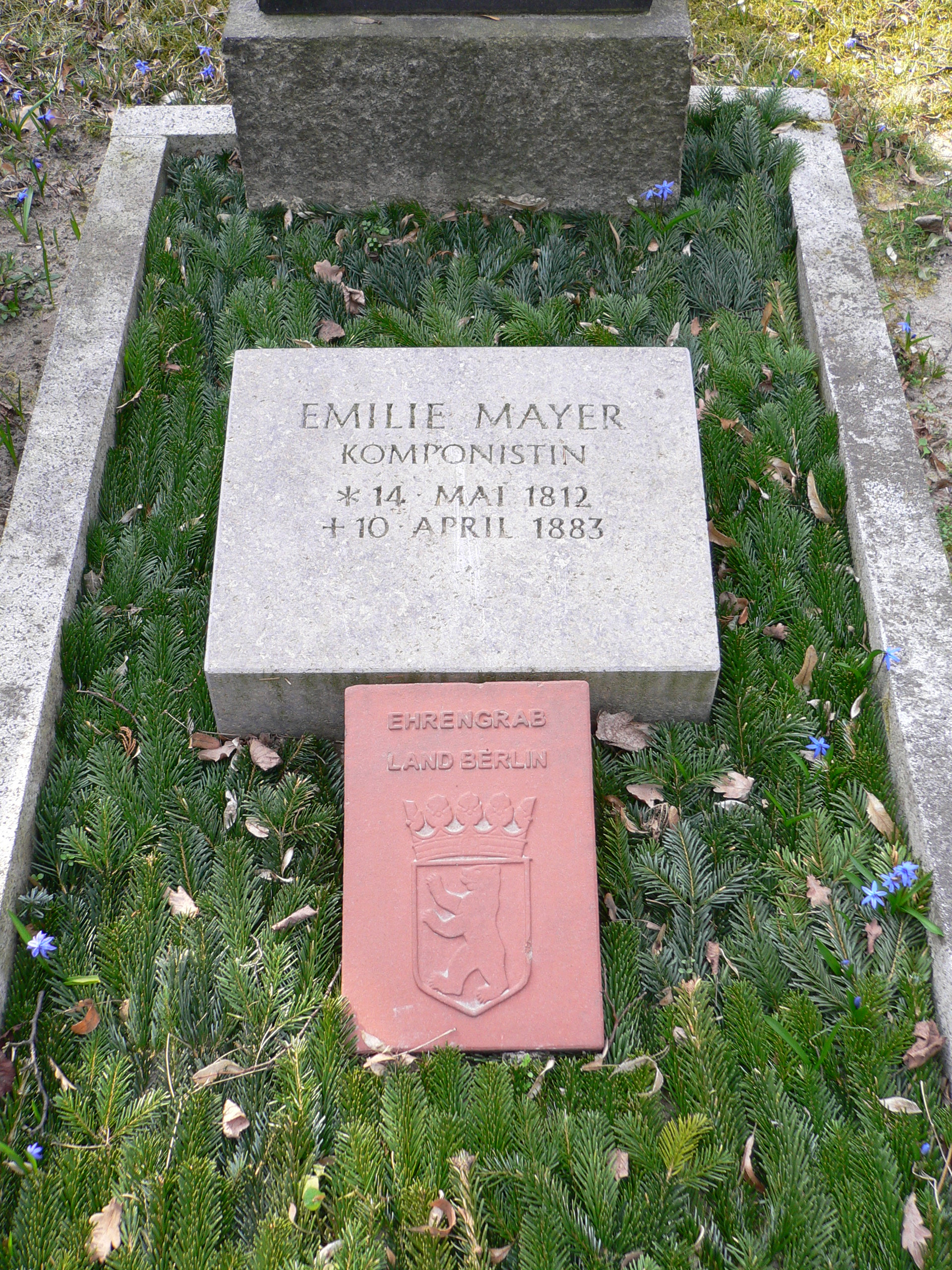
Grave of Emilie Mayer at the Holy Trinity Church, Berlin

Mayer died from pneumonia on 10 April 1883 in Berlin. She was buried at the Dreifaltigkeitsfriedhof I at the Holy Trinity Church, not far from the graves of Felix and Fanny Mendelssohn.

== Musical relationships and influence ==
The launching of Emilie Mayer's professional musical career was significantly shaped by her mentorship under composer and conductor Carl Loewe, who encouraged her to pursue composition professionally. In Stettin, Loewe helped Mayer begin to establish herself as one of the few women recognized as a symphonic composer during her lifetime, and he suggested her 1847 relocation to Berlin in order to further her career. He continued to program her works often in Stettin. His influence and encouragement helped Mayer's music become respected and championed by her professional colleagues. Even when Loewe also departed Stettin in 1866, the new directors of the Stettin Instrumentalverein continued programming her works.

Her Symphony No. 3, "Military", was influenced by military-band music of the day. Her career took place during the rise of national conservatism in Germany that followed many failed revolutions and it is likely that her successful pursuit of music composition was considered as very progressive.

Upon relocating to Berlin, Mayer became connected with influential musicians and patrons in the concert scene of the city during the 1850s, securing performances of her symphonies and chamber works. Her relationships with orchestras and conductors, including those who premiered her compositions, played a crucial role in the dissemination of her music.

== Compositional style ==
Emilie Mayer was initially influenced by the Vienna classic style, whilst her later works were more Romantic. Mayer's harmonies are characterized by sudden shifts in tonality and the frequent use of seventh chords, with the diminished seventh allowing Mayer to reach a variety of resolutions. One defining characteristic of Mayer's music is a tendency to set up a tonal centre with a dominant seventh, but not resolving to the tonic immediately; sometimes, resolution is skipped altogether. Often her rhythms are very complex, with several layers interacting at once. The first movements of her works usually follow a sonata-allegro form.

Modern scholars and conductors have often compared Mayer's orchestral works to that of Beethoven because of their dramatic contrasts, energetic rhythms, and large-scale symphonic structures. Like Beethoven, Mayer composed powerful thematic developments in her pieces along with emotional intensity within traditional Classical forms. Her symphonies combine the structure of Viennese Classicism with expressive harmonies and a wide emotional range associated with Romanticism. These characteristics, along with the ambition and scale of her orchestral works, contributed to her reputation during her lifetime as "the female Beethoven".

== Legacy ==
Although Emilie Mayer's music was highly regarded in her own time, it fell into obscurity after her death, along with the work of many women composers of the nineteenth century. Her compositions have received renewed interest from scholars, performers, and recording labels in recent decades. Modern performances of her symphonies and chamber works have revealed her distinctive voice marked by a dynamic sense of form and a lyricism that was influenced by Beethoven and Mendelssohn. Musicologists have explored Mayer's place within the broader context of women in classical music, noting her persistence in overcoming gender barriers to achieve professional recognition. Recent recordings and critical editions of her scores have contributed to a growing appreciation of her legacy. Conductors and musicologists have increasingly recognized her as one of the most significant female symphonic composers of the Romantic era, helping restore her works to the concert repertoire after more than a century of neglect.

== Selected works ==
=== Symphonies ===
- Symphony No. 1 in C minor (1850)
- Symphony No. 2 in E minor (1852)
- Symphony No. 3 in C major (1853)
- Symphony No. 5 in F minor (1857)

=== Overtures ===
- Overture in C major
- Overture to Faust

=== Chamber music ===
- Piano Trio in D minor, Op. 13
- String Quartet in G minor
- Cello Sonata in D minor, Op. 38

=== Piano ===
- Piano Sonata in D minor
- Various character pieces and studies

=== Lieder ===
- Drei Lieder, Op. 7
  1. "Du bist wie eine Blume"
  2. "O lass mich dein gedenken"
  3. "Wenn der Abendstern die Rosen"
- Zwei Gesänge
  1. "Abendglocken"
  2. "Das Schlüsselloch im Herzen"
- Erlkönig I
- Erlkönig II

== Discography ==
- Fanny Mendelssohn-Hensel, Emilie Mayer, M. Laura Lombardini Sirmen: String Quartets (CPO, 2000). String Quartet in G minor, op. 14. Performed by: Erato Quartett Basel.
- Fanny Hensel, Emilie Mayer, Luise Adolpha LeBeau (Dreyer Gaido, 2003). Symphony No. 5 in F minor. Performed by: Kammersymphonie Berlin, Jürgen Bruns (conductor).
- Mayer: Violin Sonatas (Feminae Records, 2012): Sonata in E minor for Violin and Piano, op. 19 – Sonata in E-flat Major for Violin and Piano – Sonata in A minor for Violin and Piano, op. 18. Performed by: Aleksandra Maslovaric (violin), Anne-Lise Longuemare (piano).
- Emilie Mayer (Capriccio, 2018). Symphony no. 4 in B minor – Piano Concerto in B flat major – String Quartet in G minor – Piano Sonata in D minor – Tonwellen. Valse – Maricia in A major. Performed by: Ewa Lupiec, Yang Tai (piano), Klenke Quartett, Neubrandenburger Philharmonie, Stefan Malzew, Sebastian Tewinkel (conductors).
- Emilie Mayer (CPO, 2020). Symphony No. 1 in C minor – Symphony No. 2 in E minor. Performed by NDR Radiophilharmonie conducted by Leo McFall.
- Emilie Mayer (CPO, 2022). Symphony No. 3 in C major 'Sinfonie Militar' – Symphony No. 7 in F minor. Performed by NDR Radiophilharmonie conducted by Jan Willem de Vriend.
- Emile Mayer (Hänssler Classic, 2021). Symphony No. 3 in C major - Symphony No. 6 in E major. Performed by Philharmonisches Orchester Bremerhaven, conducted by Marc Niemann.
- Emilie Mayer: Piano Trios, Notturno (CPO, 2017): Piano Trios, Op. 13 and 16; Notturno for Violin & Piano, Op. 48. Performed by: Trio Vivente.
- Emilie Mayer (CPO, 2023). Overture in D minor - Overture No. 3 in C minor - Overture No. 2 in D major - Piano Concerto in B-flat major. Performed by Tobias Koch (piano), Kölner Akademie, conducted by Michael Alexander Willens.
- BBC Radio 3 broadcast five hours of Mayer's music from 29 November to 3 December 2021 as Composer of the Week. These are available as downloads on BBC Sounds and as podcasts.

== Sources ==
- Martina Sichardt: "Auf den Spuren einer vergessenen Komponistin. Emilie Mayer (1821–1883)". With a catalogue of works by Karola Weil (in German). In: Bettina Brand, Martina Helmig et al. (eds.): Komponistinnen in Berlin. Musikfrauen, Berlin 1987, 150–178. DOI:10.25366/2025.263
- Eva Rieger: "Emilie Mayer". In: The New Grove Dictionary of Woman Composers, ed. by Julie Anne Sadie and Rhian Samuel, London 1994, 321.
- Martha Furman Schleifer, Linda Plaut: "Emilie Mayer (1812–1883)". In: Women Composers. Music through the Ages. Volume 8, Composers born 1800–1899: Large and Small Instrumental Ensembles, ed. by Sylvia Glickman (= Women Composers 8). Detroit, Mich. 2006, 131–136.
- "Forgotten Works of the ‘Female Beethoven’ Piano Concerto by Emilie Mayer." Kölner Akademie, 10 Aug. 2023.
- Barbara Beuys: "Emilie Mayer." Fembio. 2021. Accessed 14 Feb. 2024.
- Chloé van Soeterstède: "Chloé van Soeterstède on Emilie Mayer." Scottish Chamber Orchestra, accessed 22 Apr. 2024.
- Sadownik, S. (2020). The Lieder of Emilie Mayer (1812-1883), Accessed 5 May 2025.
- Cormac, J. (2025) ‘Regionalizing the nation: The symphonies of Franz Lachner and Emilie Mayer in relationship to German national identity’, Journal of the American Musicological Society, 78(2), pp. 361–408. doi:10.1525/jams.2025.78.2.361. Accessed 17 Sept. 2025
