= Johann Gottfried Moritz =

German musical instrument builder

Johann Gottfried Moritz (1777 - 23 July 1840) was a German musical instrument builder, best known as one of the inventors of the modern tuba.

== Biography ==
Moritz was born in Berlin in 1777. From 1799 he apprenticed as an instrument builder in Leipzig, then in 1805 moved to Dresden. From 1808 he returned to Berlin and opened his own workshop. In 1819 he was appointed as instrument maker to the Prussian royal court, where he worked for most of his career.

Together with Wilhelm Friedrich Wieprecht, the director of the royal military music corps, Moritz was successful in greatly improving the valve system used on early brass instruments. These valves designed by Moritz and Wieprecht were known as “Berliner Pumpen”, and were more reliable than the previous models. Shortly after that, Moritz invented the "Bass tuba in F", the first modern tuba, which he patented in 1835. Wieprecht included the new tuba in military bands almost immediately, where its descendants remain used as the bass instrument in marching bands today. The oldest remaining original tuba from Johann Gottfried Moritz's workshop is today held in the Musikinstrumenten-Museum Berlin.

In 1835, Johann Gottfried retired from building instruments, with the manufacturing business being taken over by his son Carl Wilhelm Moritz. Their sons and grandsons kept the business in family hands more or less continuously over the following century and a half, until economic issues following World War 2 forced its closure in 1959.
