= Tuba =

Brass instrument

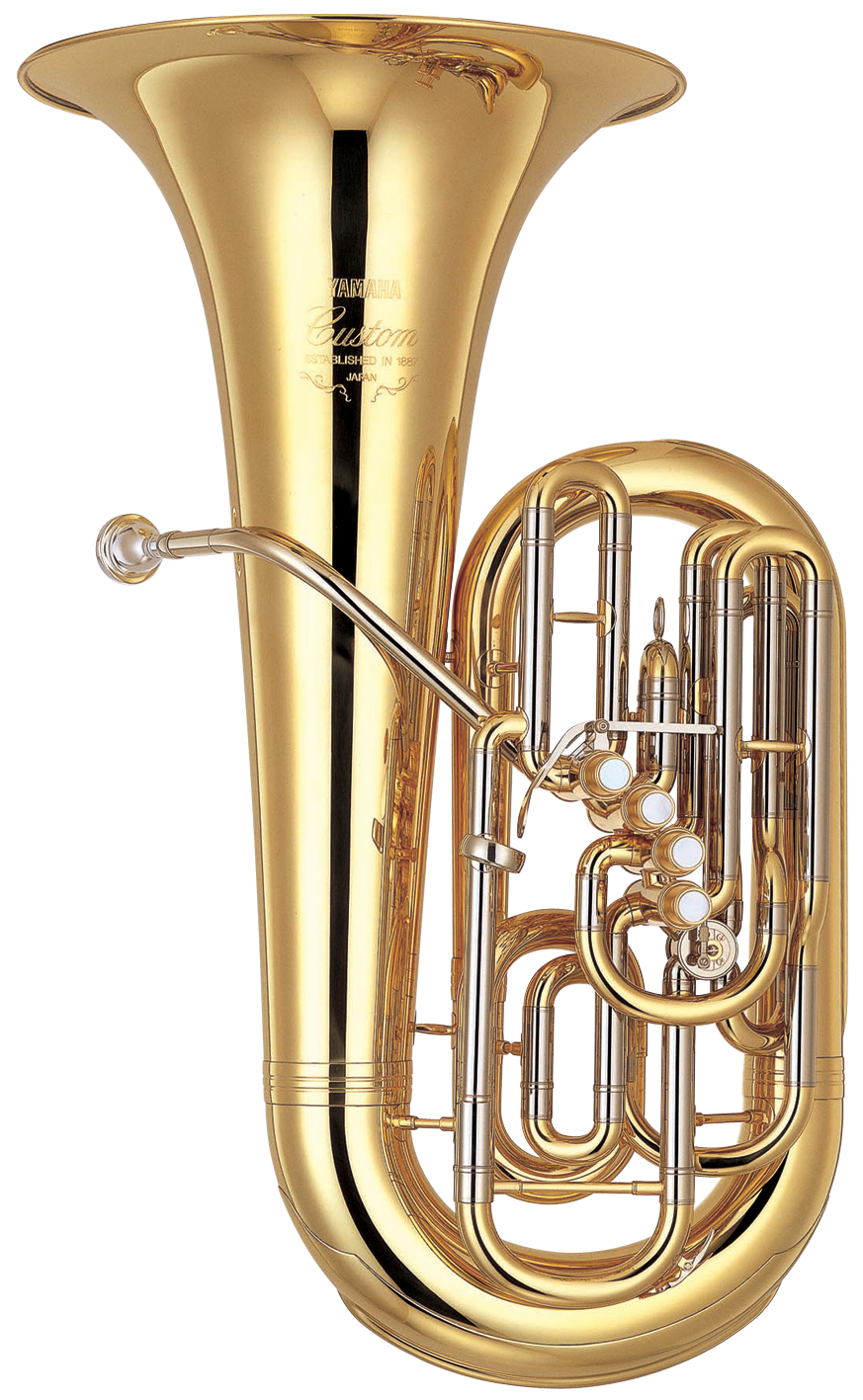
- A bass tuba in F with front-action piston valves

Brass instrument
- Classification: Aerophone; Labrosone; Bugle
- Hornbostel–Sachs classification: 423.231.2 (Valved lip-reed aerophone with wide conical bore)
- Inventor(s): Wilhelm Friedrich Wieprecht and Johann Gottfried Moritz
- Developed: 1835 in Prussia

Playing range
- The tuba has a three octave tessitura above its first pedal tone (see § Range)

Related instruments
- Euphonium; Sousaphone; Helicon; Contrabass bugle; Subcontrabass tuba; Wagner tuba; Baritone; Saxhorn; Ophicleide; Serpent; Cimbasso; Roman tuba

Musicians
- List of tubists

Sound sample
- low register high register

The tuba (Latin, "trumpet"; UK: /ˈtjuːbə/; US: /ˈtuːbə/) is a large brass instrument in the bass-to-contrabass range. It is a member of the valved bugles, a large and diverse family of instruments characterized by their wide conical bore and use of valves to alter pitch. The tuba usually has three or four valves, although some models have five or six. Descending from the serpent and ophicleide, the tuba was invented in Prussia by Wilhelm Friedrich Wieprecht and Johann Gottfried Moritz and patented in 1835 as the Baß-Tuba, pitched in 12-foot (12′) F. Its five valves provided a fully chromatic contrabass instrument with a deep, full contrabass timbre.

The tuba evolved through the 19th century as valves improved, and other makers contributed new designs and sizes. By the 1850s, Adolphe Sax had developed his E♭ and B♭ contrabass saxhorns which became standard in British brass bands, and Václav František Červený developed contrabass tubas in 16′ C and 18′ B♭ in the 1870s. A circular, wearable tuba called the helicon was designed for marching, and by the late 1890s was adopted and modified by John Philip Sousa as the sousaphone.

The tuba is used in the symphony orchestra as the bass of the brass section, and in chamber music as the bass of the brass quintet. Tubas are standard in brass, concert, and military bands, in American marching bands and Mexican banda music (often as the sousaphone), and are occasionally used in jazz and popular music. Since the mid-20th century, the tuba has been increasingly considered as a solo instrument, and has accumulated a substantial body of chamber and solo music, as well as notable concertos by composers including Ralph Vaughan Williams, Edward Gregson, and Kalevi Aho.

Tuba music is written at concert pitch in bass clef, except in brass bands where E♭ and B♭ tubas are written in treble clef as transposing instruments. The range of the tuba is large, due to the different sizes of instruments in use at different times and in different regional traditions. While the range from F_{1} to C_{4} (middle C) is easily accessible on any size of tuba, contemporary solo repertoire can include the pedal range to at least B♭_{0} and up to at least C_{5}.

A person who plays the tuba is called a tubist or tubaist, or simply a tuba player.

== History ==
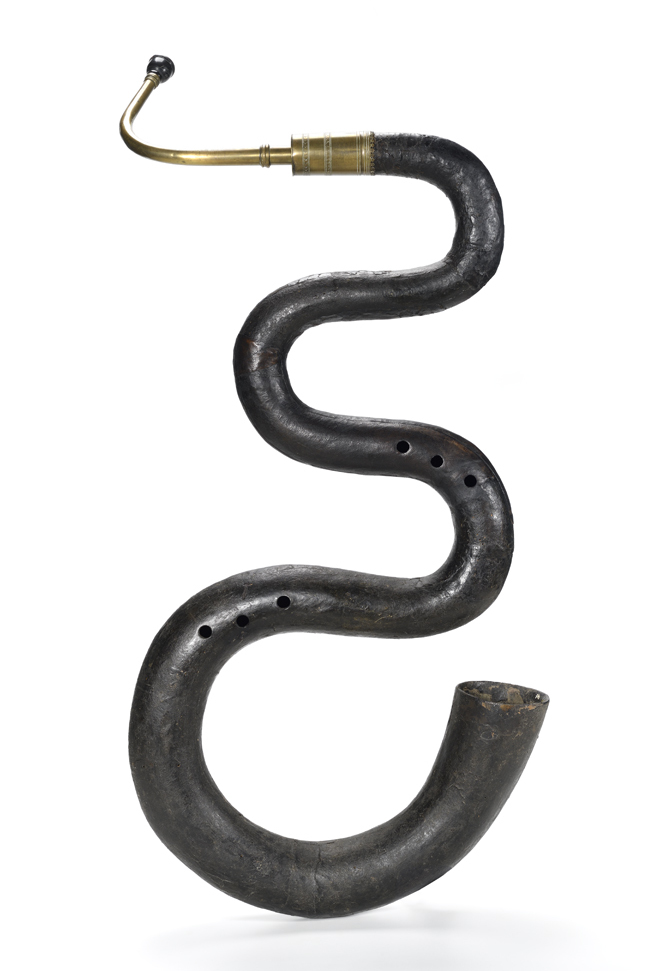
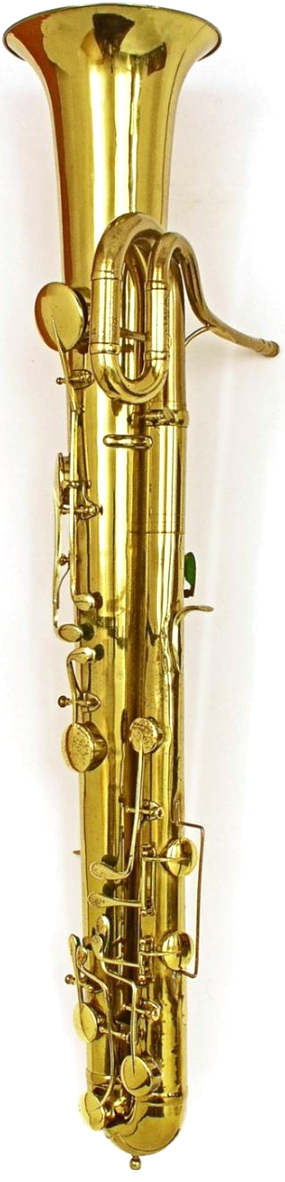
Tuba ancestors: serpent, left; ophicleide by Gautrot, right (Museo Civico di Modena; University of Edinburgh)

The tuba was developed to provide a low-pitched brass instrument, suitable for use in the brass sections of bands and orchestras. Before the emergence of the first valves in the 1820s, unmodified brass instruments like the natural horn or bugle were restricted to a single harmonic series. To expand the selection of notes available, either a slide (as on a trombone) or tone holes (as on a keyed bugle or serpent) were employed. Each of these options presented a problem for a low-pitched brass instrument. Natural instruments can only produce diatonic or chromatic scales in their high register, bass trombones of that era had long, unwieldy slides with handles, and the timbre of the serpent was often criticized.

=== Origins ===
To replace the serpent and its various upright derivatives, the Paris-based maker Jean Hilaire Asté invented the ophicleide in 1817, extending the keyed bugle into the bass register with a folded, bassoon-like form. It was enough of an improvement to be widely adopted in brass and military bands, and also in French orchestras, most notably by the composer Hector Berlioz.

In the 1820s, soon after the invention of valves, valved ophicleides quickly appeared (German: Ventilophikleide, in Vienna; French: ophicléide à piston, and in Italy, the bombardone or pelittone). They had the same overall layout as the ophicleide, but were built with valves instead of keys and tone holes. Some wide-bore variants were called bombardons.

=== The first tubas ===
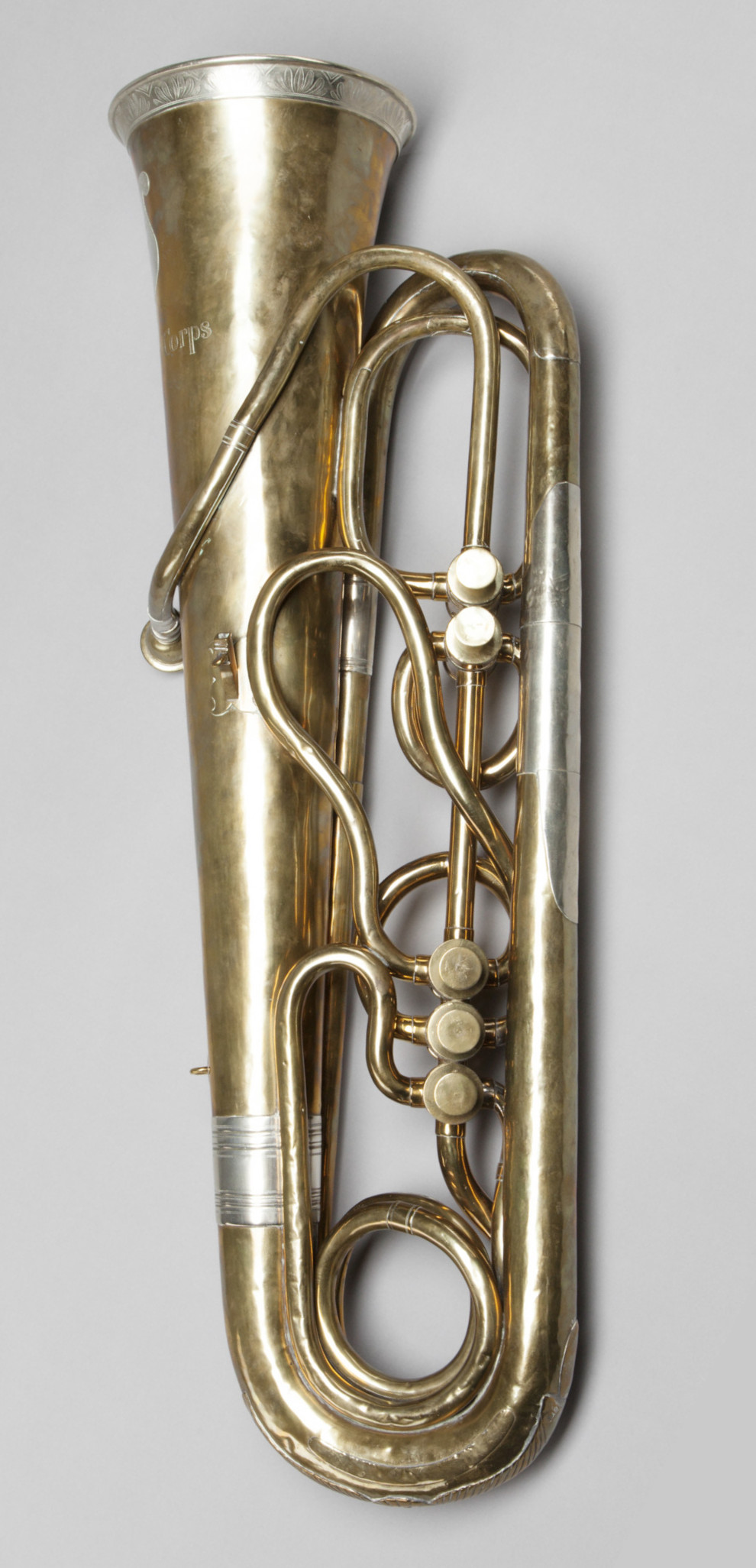
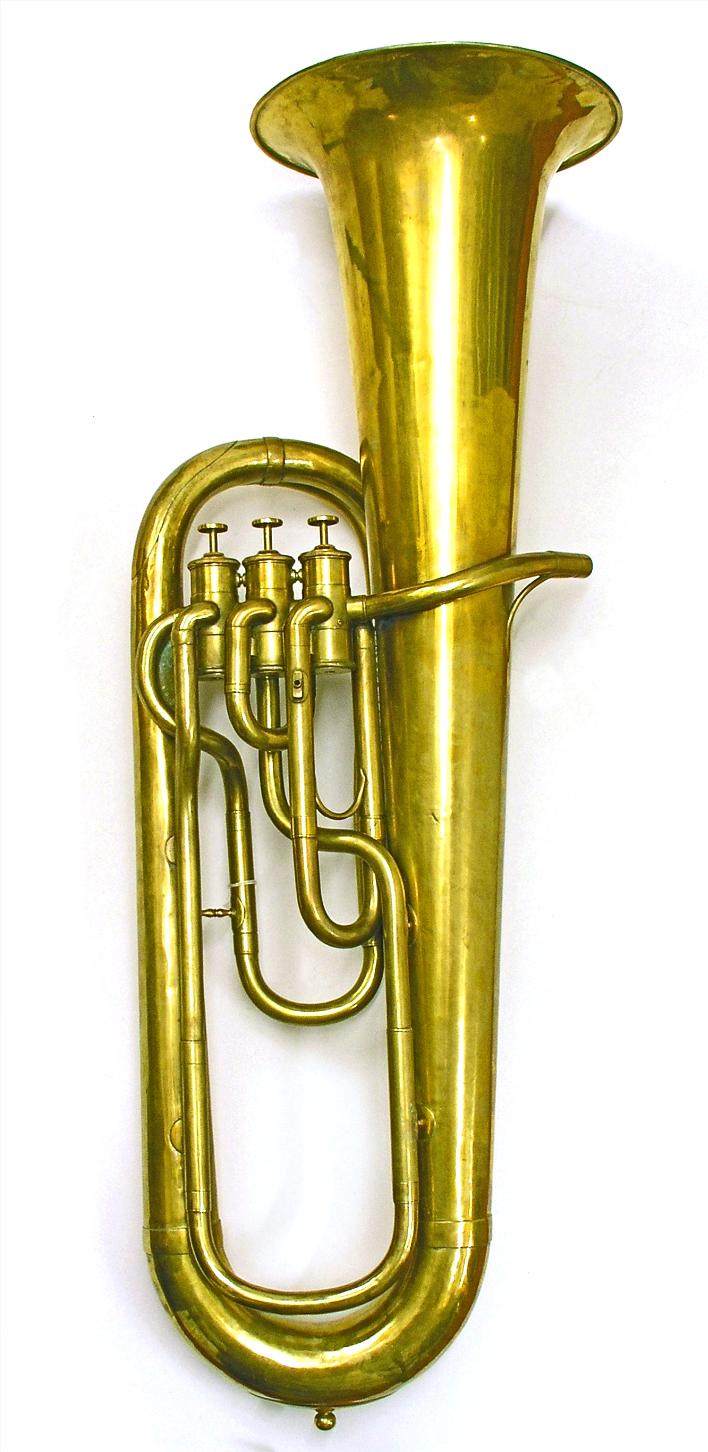
Baß-Tuba in F by Moritz, 1839, left; Contrabass saxhorn in E♭ by Sax, 1846, right (Musikinstrumenten-Museum Berlin; University of Edinburgh)

In Berlin, then part of Prussia, the military bandmaster Wilhelm Friedrich Wieprecht and the instrument maker Johann Gottfried Moritz invented the chromatische Baß-Tuba, described in their patent granted on 12 September 1835 (Prussian patent 9121). Wieprecht required an instrument capable of a secure contrabass compass for his bands, and although serpents and ophicleides were already in use, neither instrument could play much below C₂ into the contrabass range.

The Baß-Tuba was built in 12-foot (12′) F and used five Berlinerpumpen valves (forerunners of the modern Périnet piston valves) to provide a chromatic compass down to C_{1} in the pedal tone range. Berlin valves, invented by Wieprecht two years earlier, were better suited than the earlier Stölzel and Vienna valve designs for the larger bore tubing of these instruments, making the Baß-Tuba the first successful contrabass valved brass instrument.

In Paris, the instrument maker Adolphe Sax, like Wieprecht, was interested in marketing families of instruments ranging from soprano to bass, and developed his saxhorn series of brass instruments pitched in E♭ and B♭. Sax's instruments gained dominance in French military bands, and later in Britain and America. Their widespread success was a result of some popular instrument makers moving their operations, notably Gustave Auguste Besson, who moved from Paris to London, and Henry Distin, who started manufacturing them in London and later moved his business to the United States. The saxhorns, with the addition of trombones, came to constitute almost the whole instrumentation of the modern British brass band. The modern E♭ and B♭ band tubas with top-action piston valves are little-changed from their 19th-century contrabass saxhorn ancestors, aside from a wider bore and the addition of a fourth compensating valve.

The first marching tuba, called the helicon, is thought to have first appeared in Russia in the 1840s, and was first patented in 1848 by the Vienna-based maker Stowasser. Like the Ancient Roman buccina, its tubing is wrapped under the right arm with the bell resting on the player's left shoulder. The helicon became popular throughout Europe and North America, particularly for its suitability in mounted bands.

By the 1850s, the Czech maker Václav František Červený was making families of band instruments with rotary valves in Austria-Hungary, including instruments in the bass and contrabass range. He introduced his Kaiserbass C and B♭ contrabass tubas in the early 1880s, characterized by the much wider bore still used by modern instruments. By this time, Červený was one of the largest manufacturers in Europe, supplying thousands of instruments to the Imperial Russian Army. Russian nationalist composers and others in the late Romantic and 20th century periods began writing for these tubas.

=== Early American tubas ===
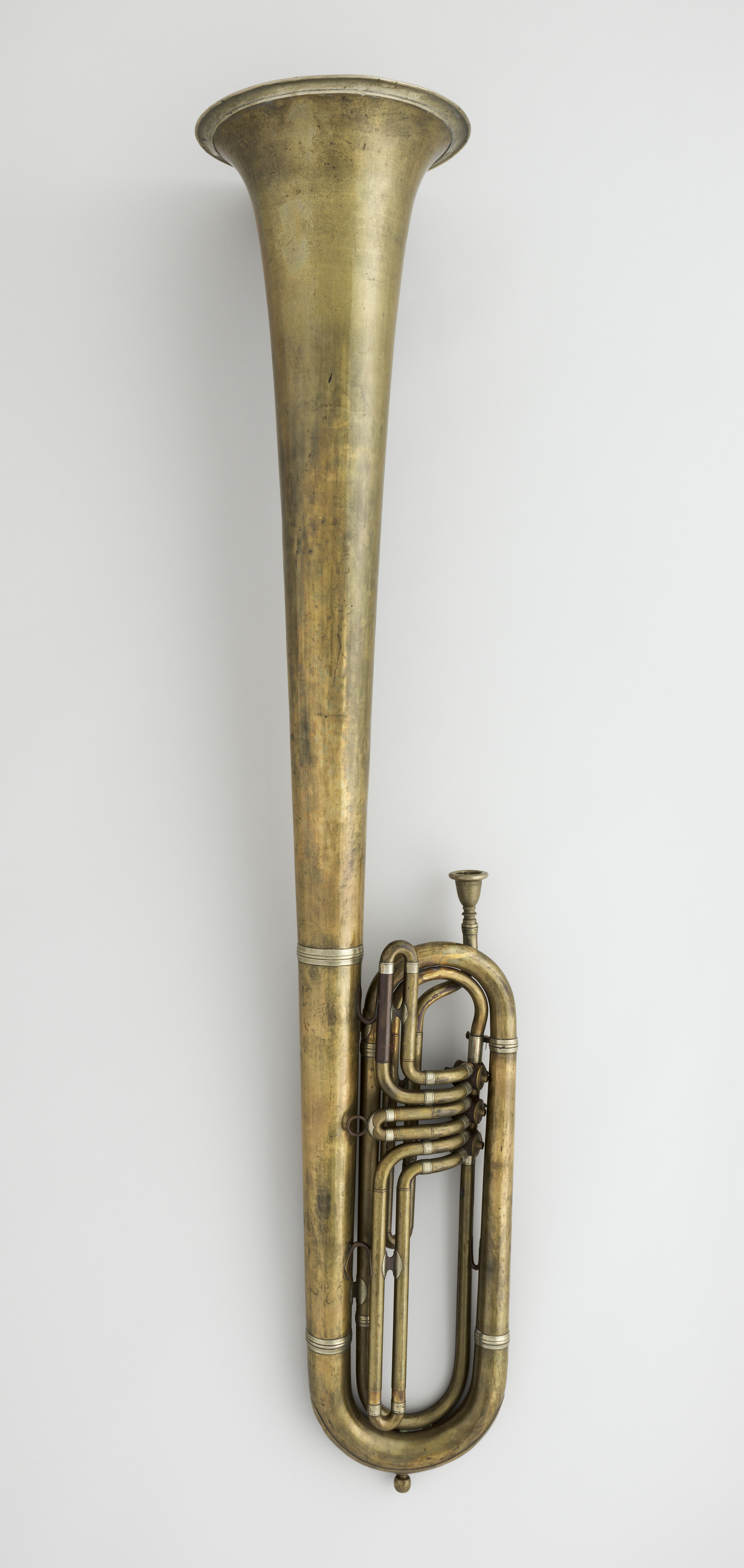
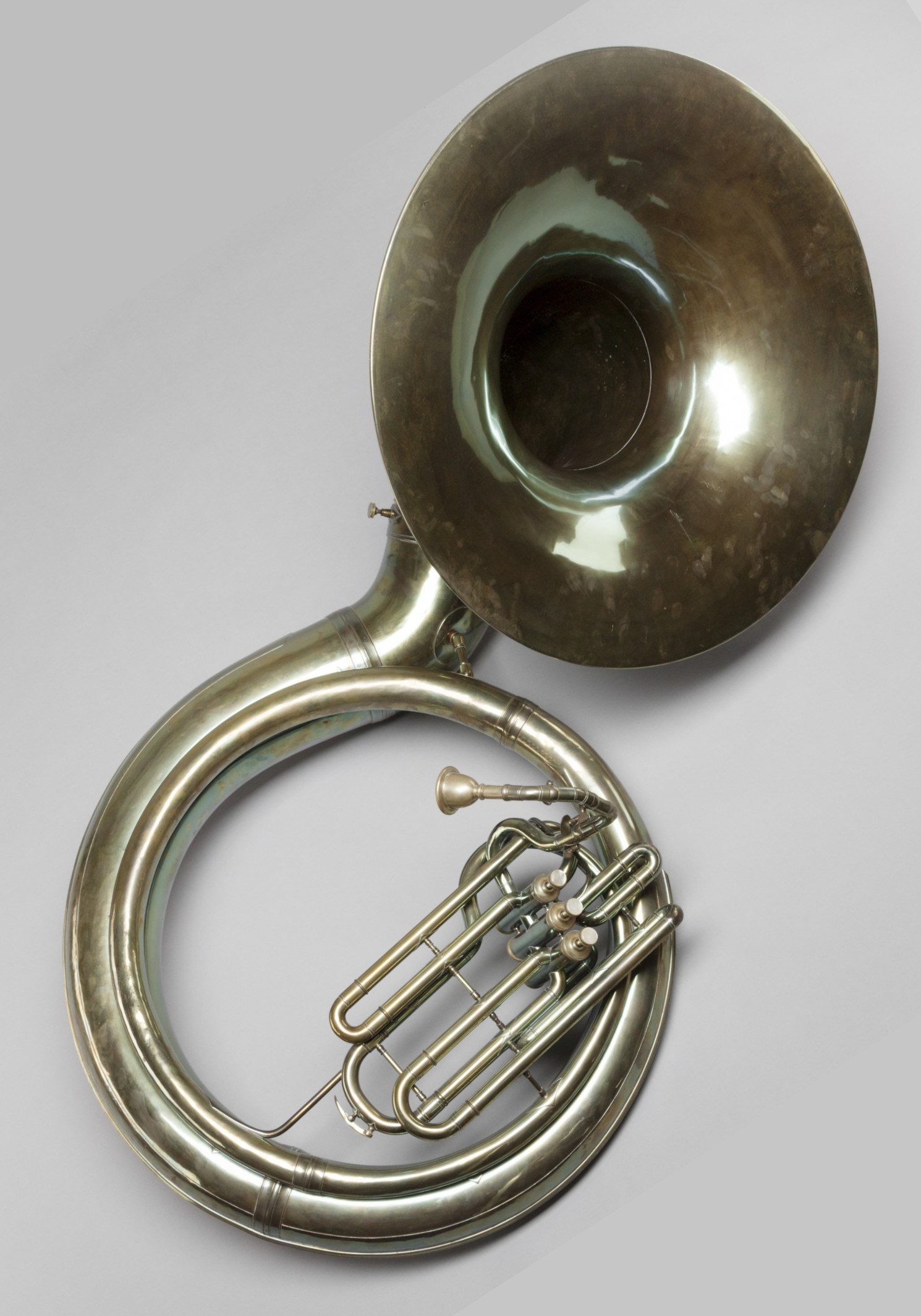
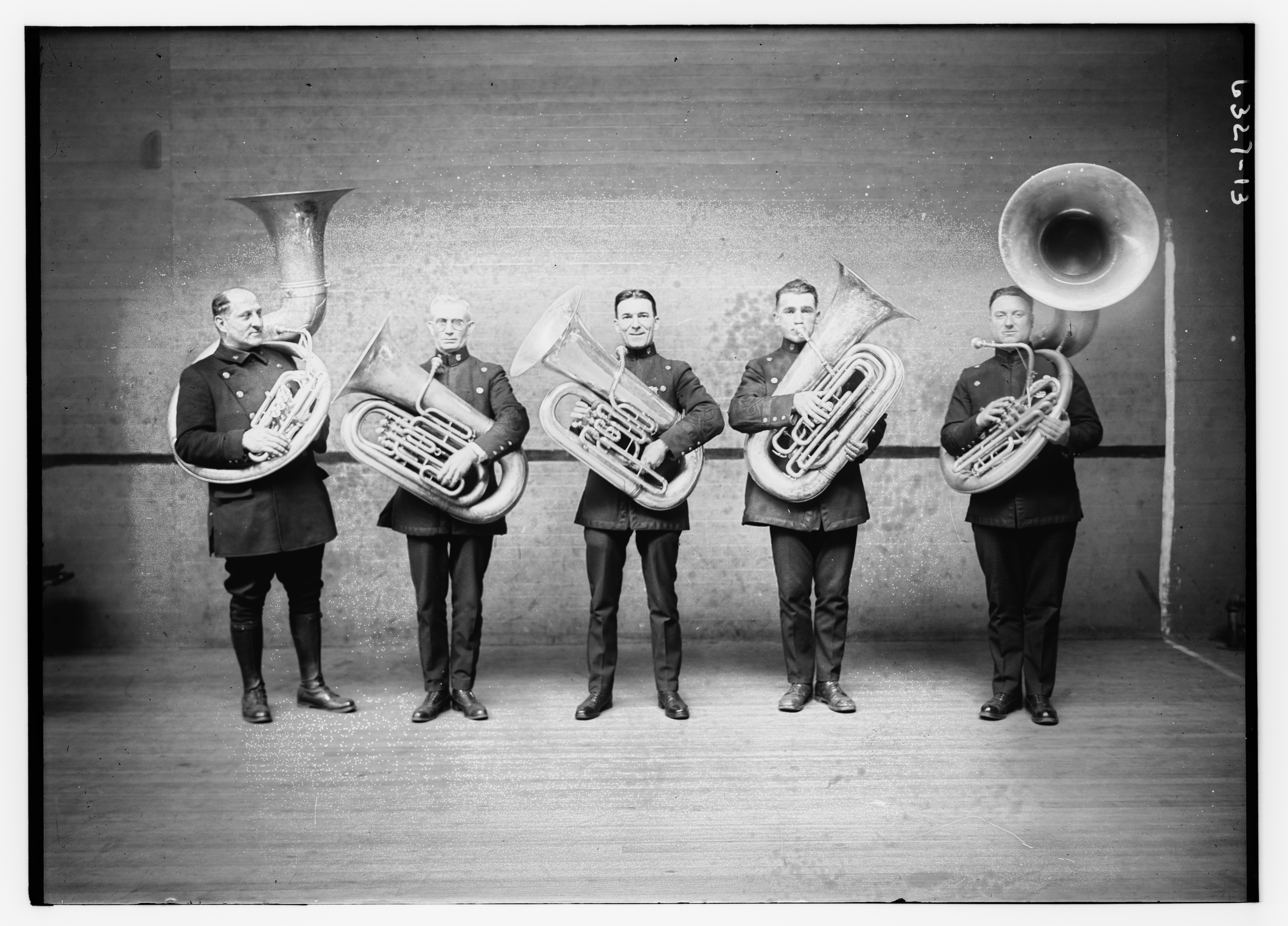
Early American tubas: Over-the-shoulder E♭ bass saxhorn 1870s, left; sousaphone c. 1925, right; New York City Police Band tuba players mid-1900s, bottom (left to right: raincatcher sousaphone, two top-action tubas, one front-action piston valve tuba, bell-front sousaphone). Metropolitan Museum of Art; Musikinstrumenten-Museum Berlin; Library of Congress

In the United States, saxhorns had become popular by the mid-19th century, particularly in military and brass bands. In 1838, the New York bandmaster Allen Dodworth (1816–1896) commissioned "over-the-shoulder" (OTS) instruments, with bells pointing backwards over the player's left shoulder, that included an E♭ bass model. This design allowed soldiers, usually marching behind the band, to better hear the music.

Demand for brass instruments grew, particularly in the 1860s during the American Civil War, and tens of thousands were made in the United States or imported from Europe, including contrabass saxhorns and helicons. After the war, the bands and their music remained popular, forming the basis of the American drum and bugle corps tradition, as well as the mixed-winds concert music popularized by the band leaders Patrick Gilmore and John Philip Sousa.

In 1893, Sousa had a contrabass helicon tuba built by the Philadelphia instrument maker J. W. Pepper with the bell pointing upwards, to better diffuse the sound in his concerts. This style of sousaphone, known as a "rain catcher", was later made by the American manufacturers Holton and C. G. Conn. In 1908, Conn released his "Wonderphone helicon" which turned the bell forward, to create the iconic modern sousaphone form.

An alumnus of Sousa's band, the Danish-born August Helleberg (1861–1936) was the founding tubist with the Chicago Symphony Orchestra in 1891 and with the Philharmonic Society of New York in 1897. He became renowned in his day as a member of the Sousa Band, and developed a type of tuba mouthpiece which has become popular with tuba players and widely copied by many makers.

=== The tuba in Italy ===
The Italian word cimbasso is thought to be a contraction of the term corno basso (lit. 'bass horn'), which first appeared in scores as c. basso or c. in basso in the 1820s. Initially, the cimbasso was a form of upright serpent or bass horn, but over the course of the 19th century the term was used loosely to refer to the lowest bass instrument available in the brass family, including the ophicleide and early Italian valved instruments such as the pelittone and bombardone. The Italian opera composer Giuseppe Verdi, dissatisfied with the sound of these instruments, commissioned a valved contrabass trombone, built in the 1880s for his late operas. By the early 20th century, this instrument, which Verdi and Giacomo Puccini called simply the trombone basso in their opera scores, had disappeared from Italian orchestras, replaced by the tuba. (Note: The modern cimbasso, commonly called for in film and video game soundtracks, was revived from Verdi's instrument, via the German contrabass trombone in F, in the early 1980s.)

=== The tuba in Britain and France ===
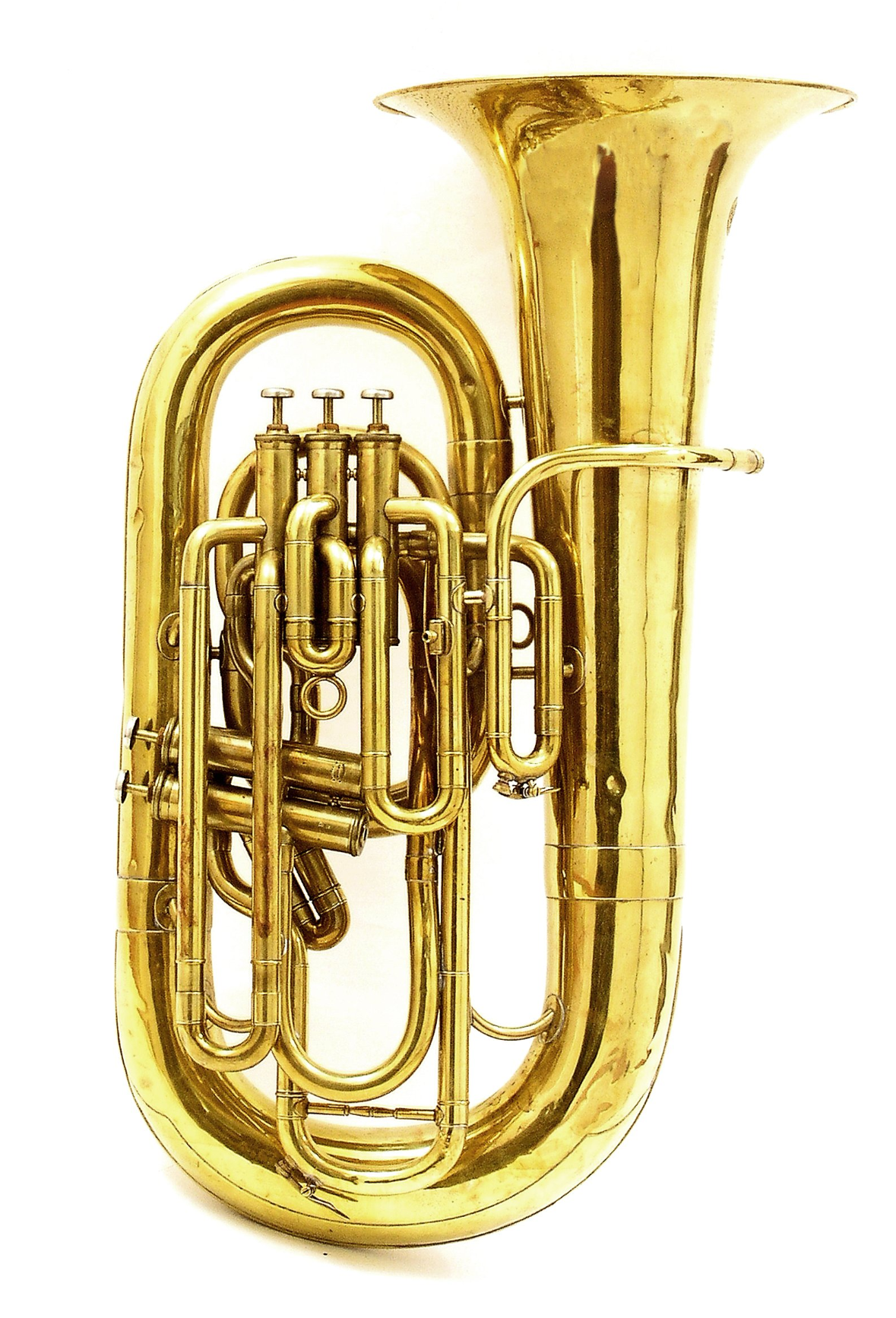
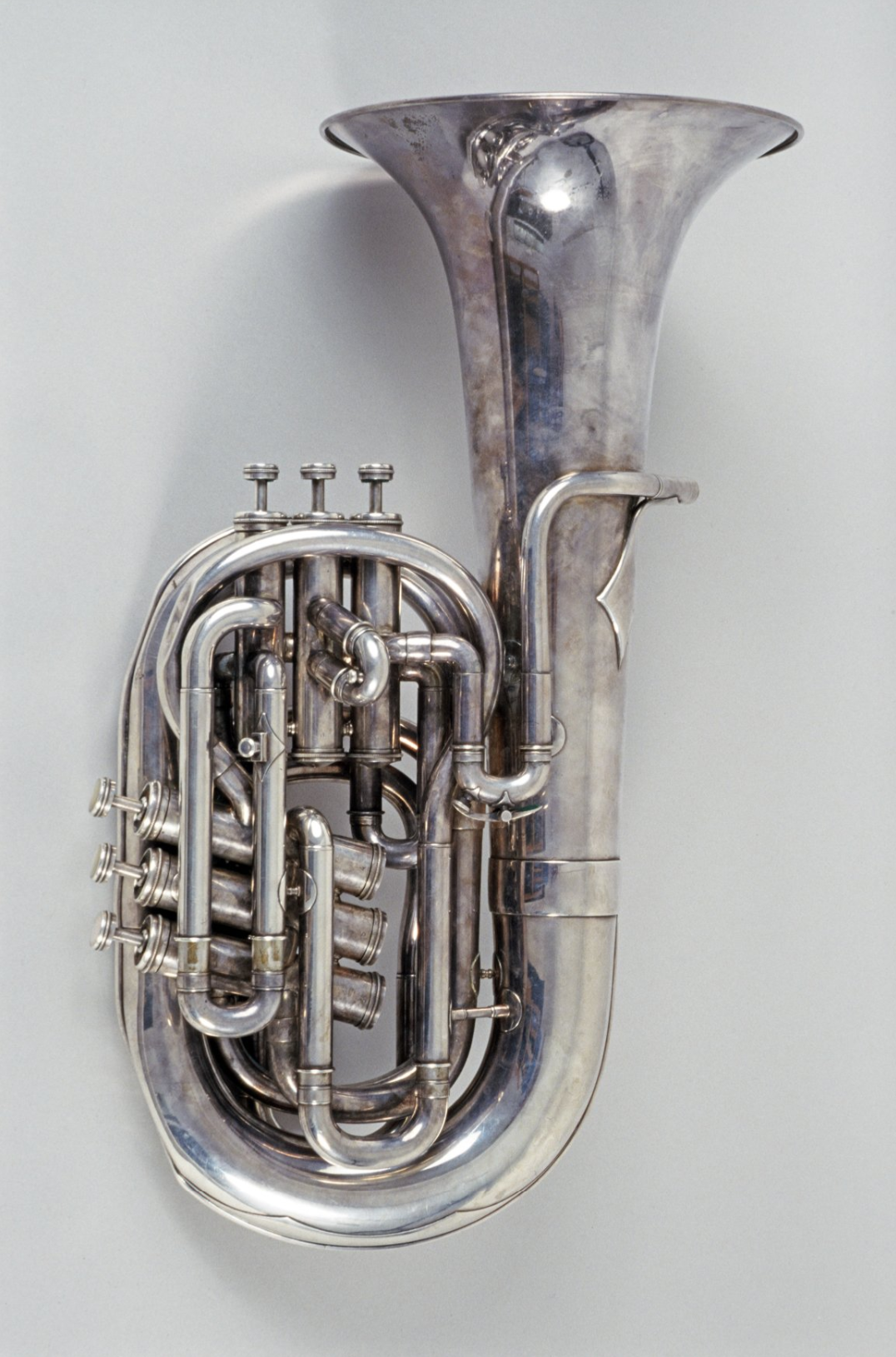
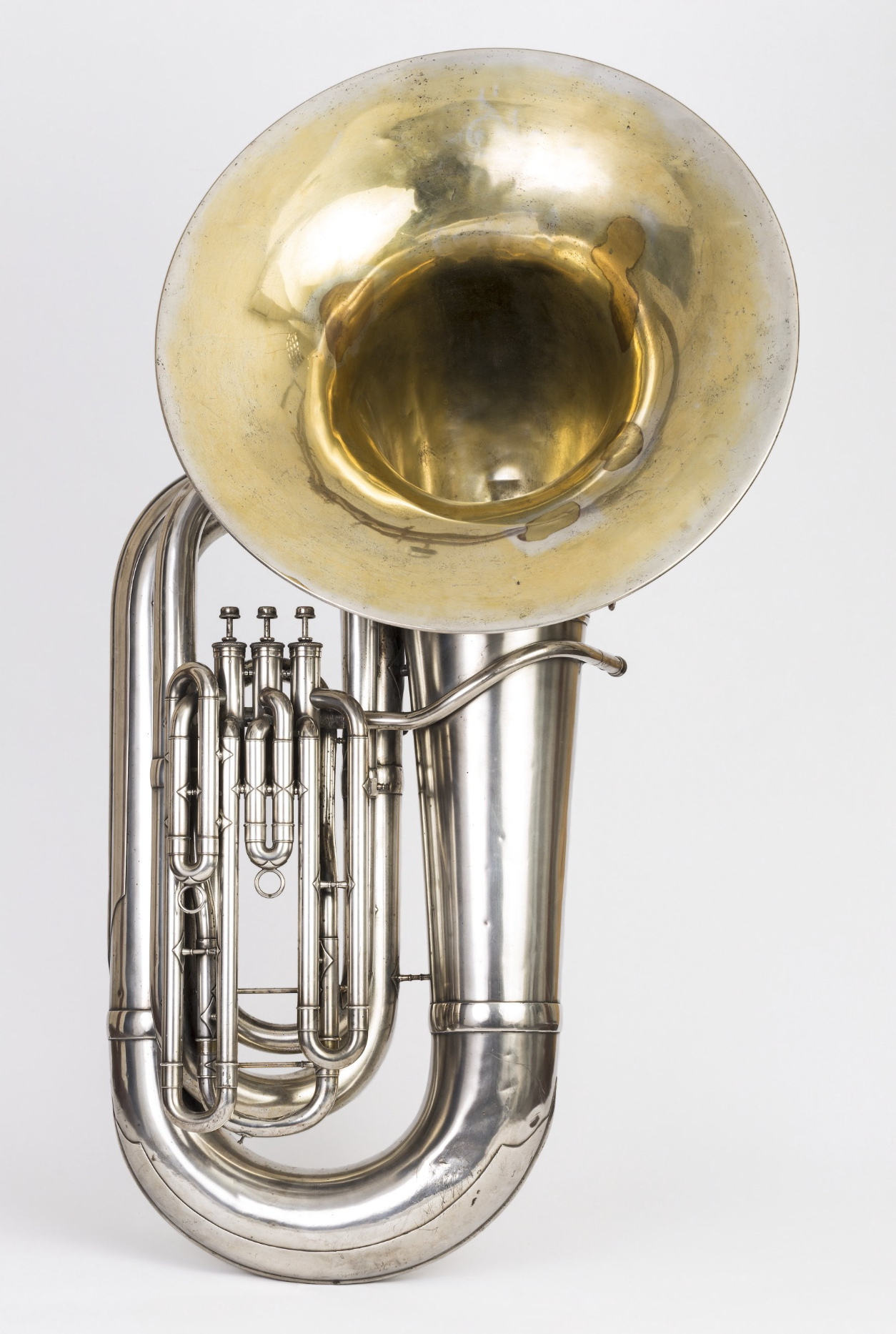
British "Barlow" model F tuba, left; French C tuba, center; Holton recording tuba, right (University of Edinburgh)

In Britain, the English F tuba was first produced in 1887 with five non-compensating piston valves. Harry Barlow (1870–1932) was appointed to Hallé Orchestra in 1894 and had Higham of Manchester build a tuba in F c. 1897, which resides in the University of Edinburgh collection. By the 1960s these "Barlow" tubas were scarce and expensive, and importing foreign-made brass instruments was prohibited, so British orchestral players switched to the readily available brass band E♭ tuba with four compensating valves.

From the late 19th century until around the 1950s in France, the orchestral tuba was the small French tuba built in 8′ C with six piston valves. It was based on the euphonium-sized bass saxhorn, which had been built since the 1850s. It quickly became standard in French orchestras and was the tuba used by French composers of that time. The difficult high orchestral excerpts for tuba are often from these French tuba parts. One example is the "Bydło" tuba solo in Maurice Ravel's 1922 orchestration of Mussorgsky's Pictures at an Exhibition, although the part descends to low F_{1} in other movements.

Tuba solo from the "Bydlo" movement of Maurice Ravel's 1922 orchestration of Modest Mussorgsky's Pictures at an Exhibition; the part was written for the small French C tuba

In the late 19th century, the saxhorn-style tubas and the wide bore rotary valve instruments popular in central Europe were usually known as bombardons, and the word tuba was mostly reserved for orchestral instruments. By the turn of the 20th century, the influence of the bombardon band instrument designs on tuba makers and players, and their infiltration into orchestras in America and Europe, meant the two terms became synonymous, and the word bombardon had largely disappeared by mid-century.

=== The Chicago Yorks ===
In 1933, Alfred "Bill" Johnson (1882–1972), the production chief at the Michigan-based York Band Instrument Company, made two large C tubas for the conductor Leopold Stokowski, who wanted an organ-like tuba sound for the Philadelphia Orchestra. One of these instruments eventually went to Arnold Jacobs, a student at the time. Jacobs later became principal tubist at the Chicago Symphony Orchestra and an influential 20th-century tuba pedagogue and player. Both instruments, known as the "Chicago Yorks", were eventually purchased by the orchestra, and are played by the current principal tubist, Gene Pokorny. Due to the quality of their sound and ease of playing, they are described by many American players and technicians as "the greatest tubas ever made", and have been the subject of much measurement, analysis, and attempts to recreate them. Replicas include the "Yorkbrunner" HB50 and HBS510 models by the Swiss instrument company Hirsbrunner (now made by the Dutch maker Adams), the Yamaha YCB-826 "Yamayork" model, the B&S 3198, and the Wessex TC-695 "Chicago York" tuba. In 2009, samples from old York tubas revealed they were made from a "gold" brass with a high copper content of 80 percent. About 100 York-inspired tubas were built by the California-based producer Kanstul Musical Instruments before the business closed in 2019.

=== The tuba in jazz ===
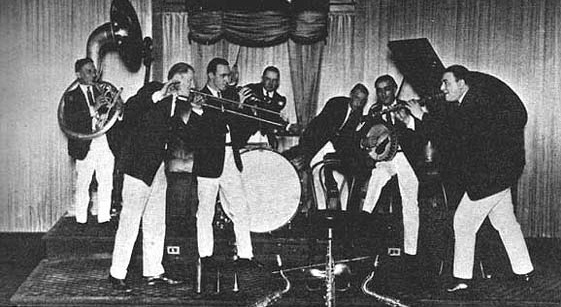
Chink Martin (far left) on sousaphone in Johnny Bayersdorffer's Novelty Orchestra, New Orleans, 1922

While the New Orleans Blue Book of ragtime standards from c. 1900 contained parts for tuba, they were only included as an alternative to the string bass parts, likely for outdoor performances. The tuba did not appear in early jazz bands until the 1920s, usually as the sousaphone, playing only oom-pah with occasional short solo breaks. The earliest known recordings with tuba were with the New Orleans Rhythm Kings in 1923, with Jelly Roll Morton on piano and Chink Martin on tuba. This continued to be the main role for jazz tuba through the dance era of the 1920s and 30s and the Dixieland and trad-jazz revival of the 1940s.

The poor bass sensitivity of early recording technology in the early days of recorded music in the 1920s led to the development of recording tubas, made with the bell pointing forward (pavillon tournant). They were designed to direct the sound towards the recording microphone, and extra players with recording tubas were sometimes brought into orchestra recording sessions to boost the string section double bass parts.

For the same reason, many jazz string bass players were expected to also play tuba. In the 1920s the New York musician Joe Tarto, adept at both, performed and recorded with almost every jazz musician of the time, including Bix Beiderbecke and Tommy Dorsey. He later played with the Paul Whiteman Orchestra and published a jazz bass method, Basic Rhythms and the Art of Jazz Improvisation (1976).

As the recording technology improved in the 1930s, players moved back to string bass. The big bands that became prevalent in the swing era during World War II did not include the tuba in their standard instrumentation of trumpets, trombones, saxophones and rhythm.

=== The tuba since World War II ===
The jazz recordings on Birth of the Cool (1957) by Miles Davis are some of the first to use tuba, recorded 1949–50

In the late 1940s, the tuba was reintroduced into cool jazz by the jazz trumpeter Miles Davis. Inspired by the band led by Claude Thornhill, he organized an ensemble of nine players that included Bill Barber on tuba. Barber plays on several Miles Davis recordings in arrangements by Gerry Mulligan and Gil Evans, including the session compilation Birth of the Cool (1957, recorded 1949–50), and the later albums Miles Ahead (1957) and Sketches of Spain (1960). In the 1950s the American band leader Stan Kenton explored using different instruments like the mellophonium to create a warm enveloping sound, especially in ballads, and in 1955 made his fifth trombonist double on tuba to make use of its distinct timbre.

William John Bell (1902–1971) was the most important American player and teacher of tuba during the first half of the 20th century, having played in the Sousa Band, Cincinnati Symphony Orchestra, the NBC Symphony Orchestra, and the New York Philharmonic. He was professor of tuba at the Manhattan School of Music, and then at Indiana University from 1961 to 1971.

The 1950s saw the tuba being considered as a solo instrument in classical music. The Concerto in F minor for Bass Tuba and Orchestra (1954) was written by the English composer Ralph Vaughan Williams for Philip Catelinet (1910–1995). A Salvation Army tubist and principal tuba with the London Symphony Orchestra, Catelinet performed it on his Barlow F tuba at the London première. William Bell performed its American premiere the following year.

Although still not commonly found as a solo instrument, it has featured in ensembles and recordings since the 1970s. In 1974, the tubist and Indiana University scholar Harvey Phillips began an annual series of Christmas concerts called Tubachristmas. These concerts, in honor of his teacher William Bell who was born on Christmas Day in 1902, take place in over 100 cities worldwide and continue to be administered each year through the Harvey Phillips Foundation. The Tubajazz Consort was also set up in 1976 by Phillips, and the euphoniumist Rich Matteson, performing jazz music replacing the usual big band saxophones and brass instruments with tubas and euphoniums.

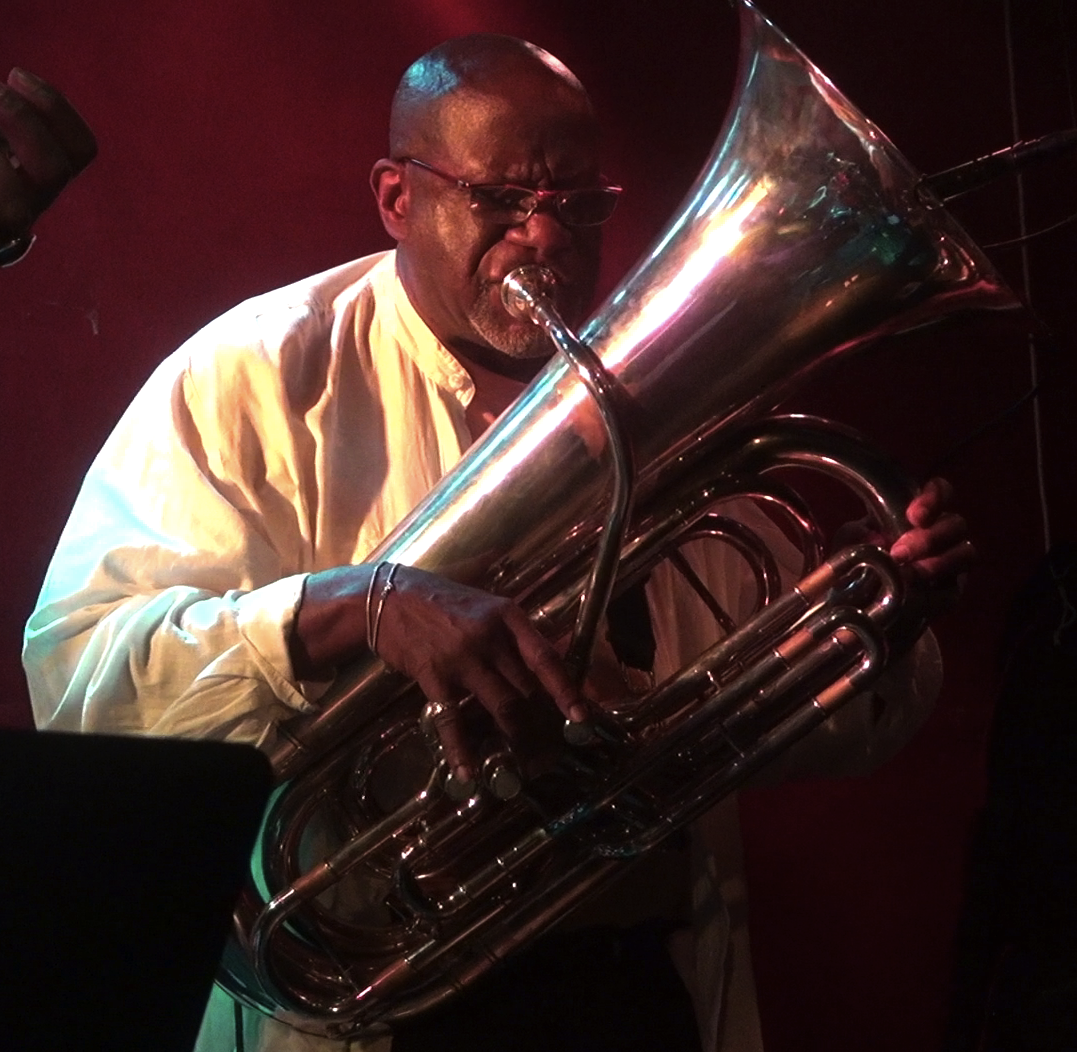
Bob Stewart, New York City 2012

New York jazz musician Howard Johnson started in the Charles Mingus band and became a leading tuba soloist and band leader in his own right, leading the NBC Saturday Night Live Band. Bob Stewart, tubist and professor of jazz history at Juilliard School, has played tuba with many jazz players including Mingus, Gil Evans, Arthur Blythe, and Henry Threadgill. Stewart's solo in the title track of Blythe's 1979 album Lenox Avenue Breakdown was described in The Penguin Guide to Jazz as "one of the few genuinely important tuba statements in jazz." In the 1980s and 90s, the Los Angeles tubist Jim Self and Samuel Pilafian of The Empire Brass Quintet made several jazz recordings.

=== Contemporary players ===
A small number of tubists have carved out successful solo careers, often combined with teaching positions at prominent music conservatories. Soloists include Velvet Brown, Wilfried Brandstötter of Mnozil Brass, and Norwegian tubists Øystein Baadsvik and August Schieldrop.

Since Hurricane Katrina in 2005, the sousaphone has made a comeback in jazz and contemporary music due to an influx of musicians from New Orleans to other cities. In 2024, New York tubist Marcus Rojas stated that there are "two tubas on late-night TV. That would have been unheard of 15 years ago!" Tuba Gooding Jr. plays in The Roots on The Tonight Show Starring Jimmy Fallon, and Ibanda Ruhumbika appeared in The Late Show Band on The Late Show with Stephen Colbert.

== Construction ==
In the classification scheme of musical instruments, the tuba is considered a bass valved bugle. The valved bugles form a large family of brass instruments that includes the euphonium, flugelhorn, and the wider-bored members of the saxhorn family. They are distinguished by having a wide conical bore, and valves to alter pitch. The bore of bugles is a wider conical shape compared to other brass instruments, such as the horn or cornet, which are, in turn, wider than the cylindrical-bore trumpet and trombone. The wider conical shape causes the instrument to favor lower spectral content, producing a mellow, warm timbre. The rapidly widening bore of the tubing leading to the bell, and the bell's large diameter, combine to amplify these lower frequencies and produce a deep contrabass sound.

=== Sizes ===
Tubas are made in four pitches, determined by the length of the open tubing with no valves engaged. The smaller bass tuba is built in 12-foot (12′) F or 13′ E♭, while the larger contrabass tuba is built in 16′ C or 18′ B♭. Often the contrabass tubas are called "CC" or "BB♭" tubas, based on an archaic English variant of Helmholtz pitch notation. The terms bass and contrabass are not often used by composers, with the choice of instrument left to the player, often based on the desired timbre rather than the range required by the part.

F tuba
The modern F tuba descends from the original 1835 Baß-Tuba in F. It is commonly used by professional players as a solo instrument, or to play higher parts in orchestras where a C tuba would be the usual instrument. In most of Europe, the F is the standard orchestral tuba, the larger C or B♭ tuba used only when the extra weight is desired. In Vienna, the Wienerkonzerttuba is an F tuba with six rotary valves, three for each hand. The British orchestral tuba from the late 19th century until the 1950s was in F with four or five piston valves, and a narrower bore profile closer to that of the euphonium.

E♭ tuba
The E♭ tuba is most commonly found in brass and military bands. Often called the "E♭ bass" in bands, it is built in saxhorn form with three top-mounted piston valves, and usually a fourth compensating valve on one side. In British orchestras, the E♭ tuba displaced the old British F tuba in the 1960s, and is still found in British orchestras today, although some players have adopted the C tuba since the 1990s. E♭ tubas are also sometimes found in German form with five rotary valves, mostly in Scandinavian orchestras.

C tuba
The tuba in C (sometimes denoted "CC") is the most widely used orchestral tuba outside of Germany and Russia, and all professional models have five non-compensating valves. It is also found in concert bands in the US. On piston-valve C tubas, the fifth valve is usually a rotary valve.

B♭ tuba
The largest tuba, the contrabass in B♭ is the tuba of choice in German, Austrian, and Russian orchestras, usually with rotary valves. In the United States, the B♭ tuba usually has front-action piston valves. It is the most common in schools, largely due to the use of B♭ sousaphones in high school marching bands. The B♭ tuba is also built in saxhorn style with three top-mounted piston valves, and usually a fourth compensating side valve. It is standard in British brass bands, where it is often denoted as the "BB♭ bass" or the "double B".

==== Quarter designation ====
Tubas of the same pitch will have the same length of tubing but can vary in other dimensions, such as overall width of the tubing sections, bell diameter, and conical bore profile. These measurements are categorized with a sizing scale denoted in quarters, with 4/4 designating a full-size tuba. Smaller instruments, often student or intermediate models with only three valves, may be described as 3/4 or even 1/2 size instruments. These are common in schools, where a full-size tuba may be too large, or in marching bands to reduce weight. Larger instruments are denoted as 5/4, or 6/4 for the largest tubas, sometimes known as grand orchestral tubas. These include the Conn 36J "Orchestra Grand Bass" from the 1930s, and the well-known large Chicago York tubas popularized by Arnold Jacobs and replicated by several makers. The designations have no standardized measurements of bore widths or bell diameters, but are useful for comparing models in a single manufacturer's catalog.

==== Other sizes ====
The euphonium, pitched in 9′ B♭ a fourth above the bass tuba in F, is sometimes referred to as a tenor tuba, particularly by British composers. This term can also refer specifically to the German Baryton, a similar instrument in B♭ with rotary valves. These instruments are used to play tenor tuba parts, ophicleide parts, and high tuba parts written for the similarly sized small French tuba.

A small number of very large novelty subcontrabass tubas have been built, and four playable instruments with functioning valves survive, mostly in museums. In 2019, the Harvard University Band restored "La Prodigieuse", a 36′ B♭ instrument pitched an octave below the B♭ contrabass built in the 1890s by Besson. Another survives in the same pitch, built by Bohland & Fuchs and first exhibited in 1928. In 1956, a 32′ C tuba built c. 1899 featured in the first comedy Hoffnung Music Festival, and a 36′ B♭ Riesentuba with four rotary valves was built in 2010 and resides in the Markneukirchen Musical Instrument Museum.

=== Variants ===
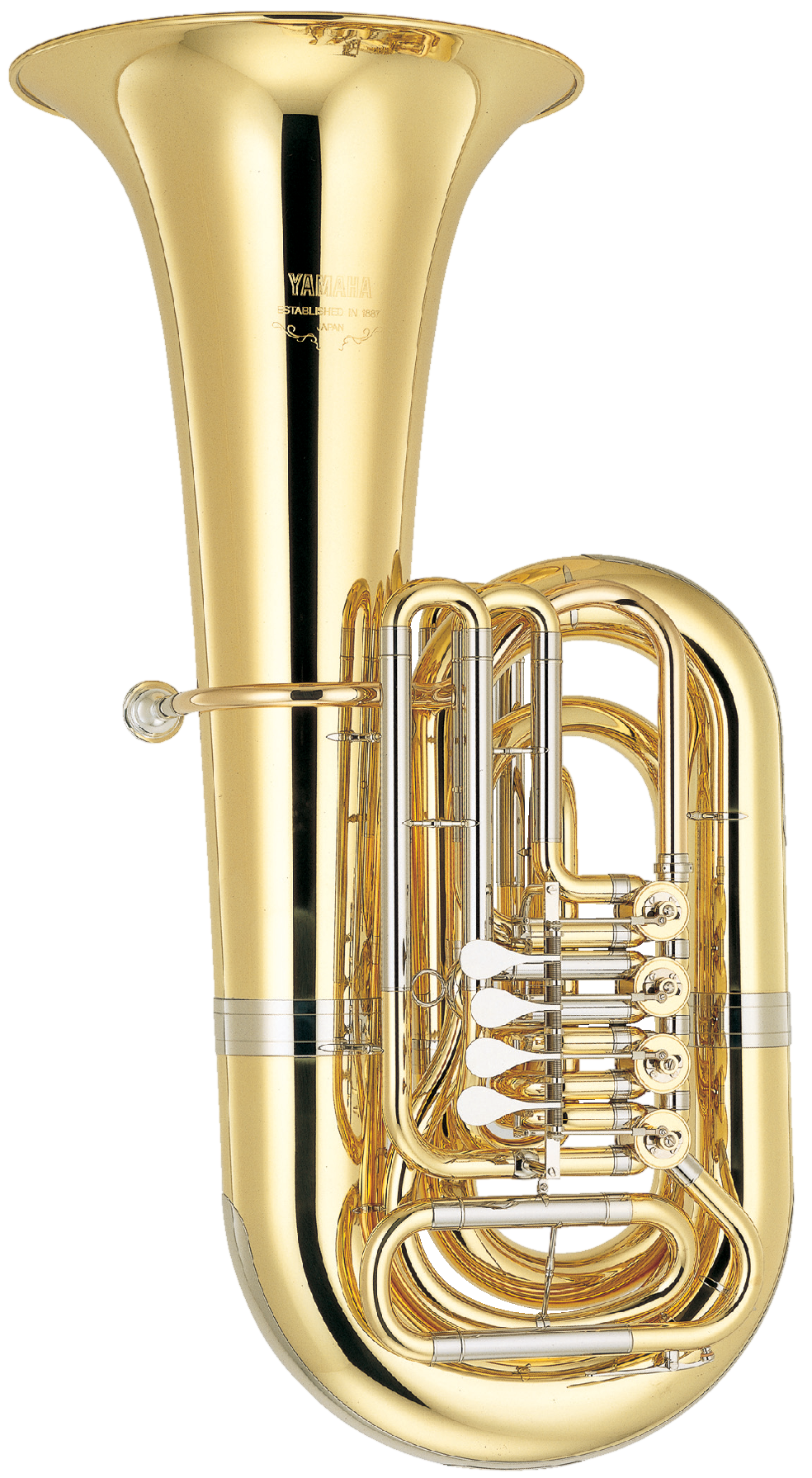
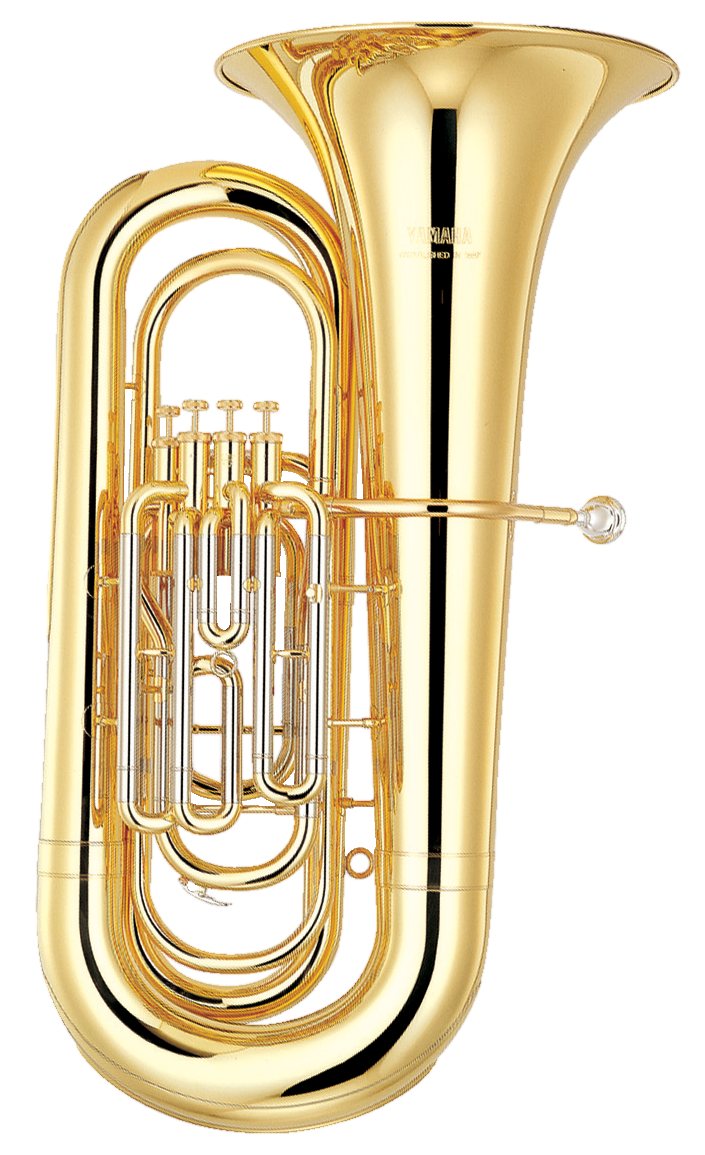
Main styles of tuba: the German style (left) has "front action" valves right of the bell; the French or saxhorn style (right) has "top action" valves left of the bell. Yamaha Corporation

The development of tubas took place in several regions throughout the 19th and 20th centuries, resulting in many different forms with different bores, bell tapers (bore profile) and sizes, and different types and numbers of valves. Broadly, tubas can be divided into two main groups: "German style" and "French style."

The "German style" tubas, derived from the Baß-Tuba and later tubas by Červený, have the leadpipe attached to the left side of the bell (facing the player), and the tubing and valves to the right, with the valves mounted in the middle and operated from the front ("front action"). These tubas usually have rotary valves, although American tubas since the late 19th century commonly use front action piston valves, oriented horizontally to be played in the same position as the usual rotary valves.

The saxhorn-derived, "French style" tubas have piston valves mounted vertically and operated from the top of the instrument ("top action"), and the leadpipe from the mouthpiece is attached to the right side of the bell, with the valves and tubing positioned to the left. These are common in France, Britain, and throughout the British Commonwealth, particularly in brass and military bands.

For all of these instruments, the valves are operated by the right hand. Saxhorn-style instruments with a fourth compensating valve often place the fourth valve on the side, operated by the left hand.

==== Tubas for marching ====
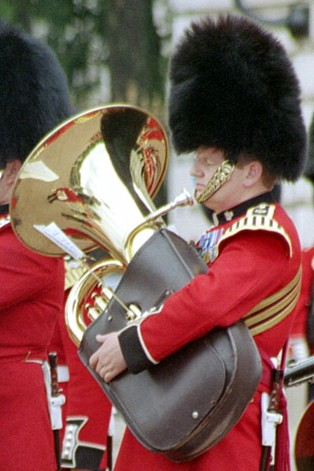
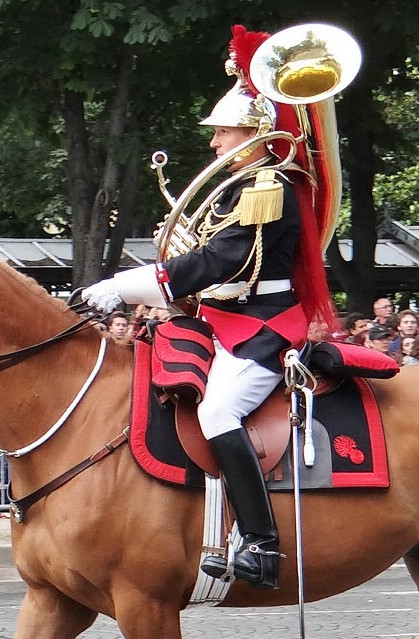
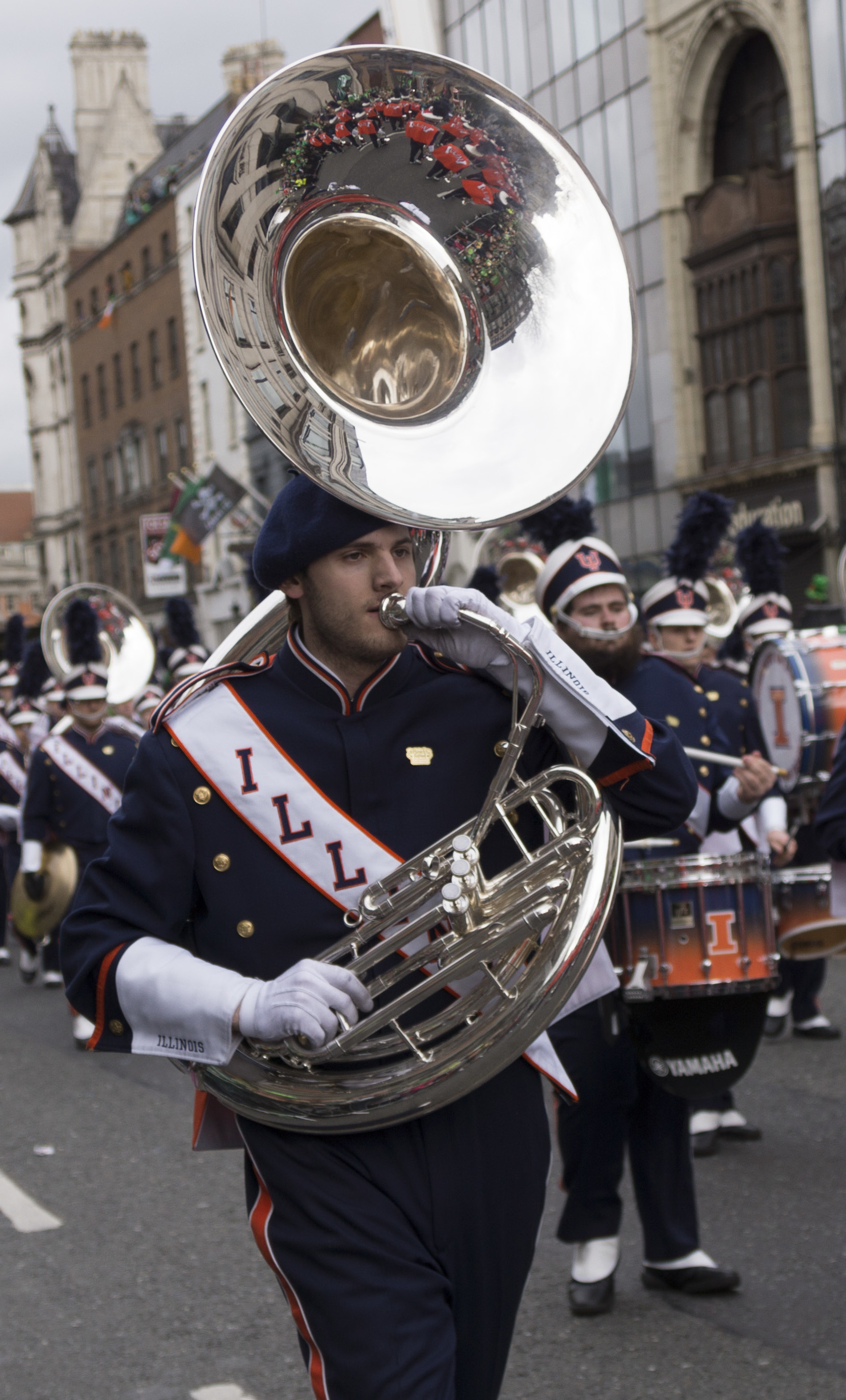
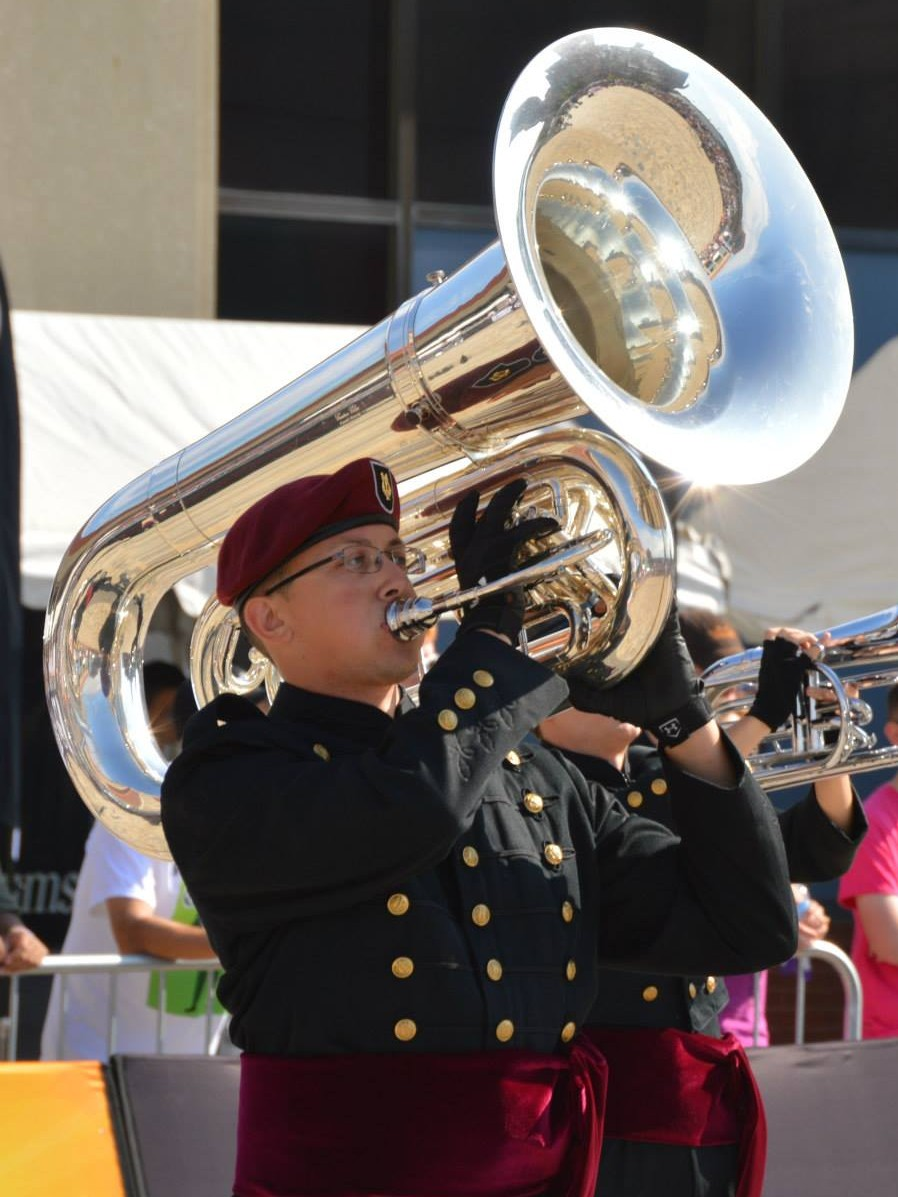
E♭ bass with marching harness, top left; helicon on horseback, top right; sousaphone, bottom left; drum and bugle corps contrabass bugle, bottom right

Standard tubas can be played whilst standing and marching, which is the usual practice in British brass bands and military bands. For player comfort and to avoid strain or injury, a strap joined to metal rings soldered onto the tuba or a harness for the bottom bow are used to take the weight, via an over-shoulder strap or waist band.

In North America, most marching bands use the sousaphone, wrapped under one arm with the bell resting on the opposite shoulder, which is easier to carry and play while marching. The earlier helicon, from which the sousaphone was derived, is also used by bands in Europe and other parts of the world.

The contrabass bugle is a marching adaptation of the tuba carried on the shoulder, designed specifically for use on the field. First introduced in 1959 for drum and bugle corps, these instruments were initially built in 21′ G, in accordance with the rule at the time that all brass instruments in corps be pitched in G, and generally have two valves. Following a rule change in 2000, they have been built with three or four valves and pitched in B♭. Since the transition to B♭ instruments, they are more commonly referred to as marching tubas. Some models can be converted from a standard concert configuration into a marching configuration.

=== Valves ===
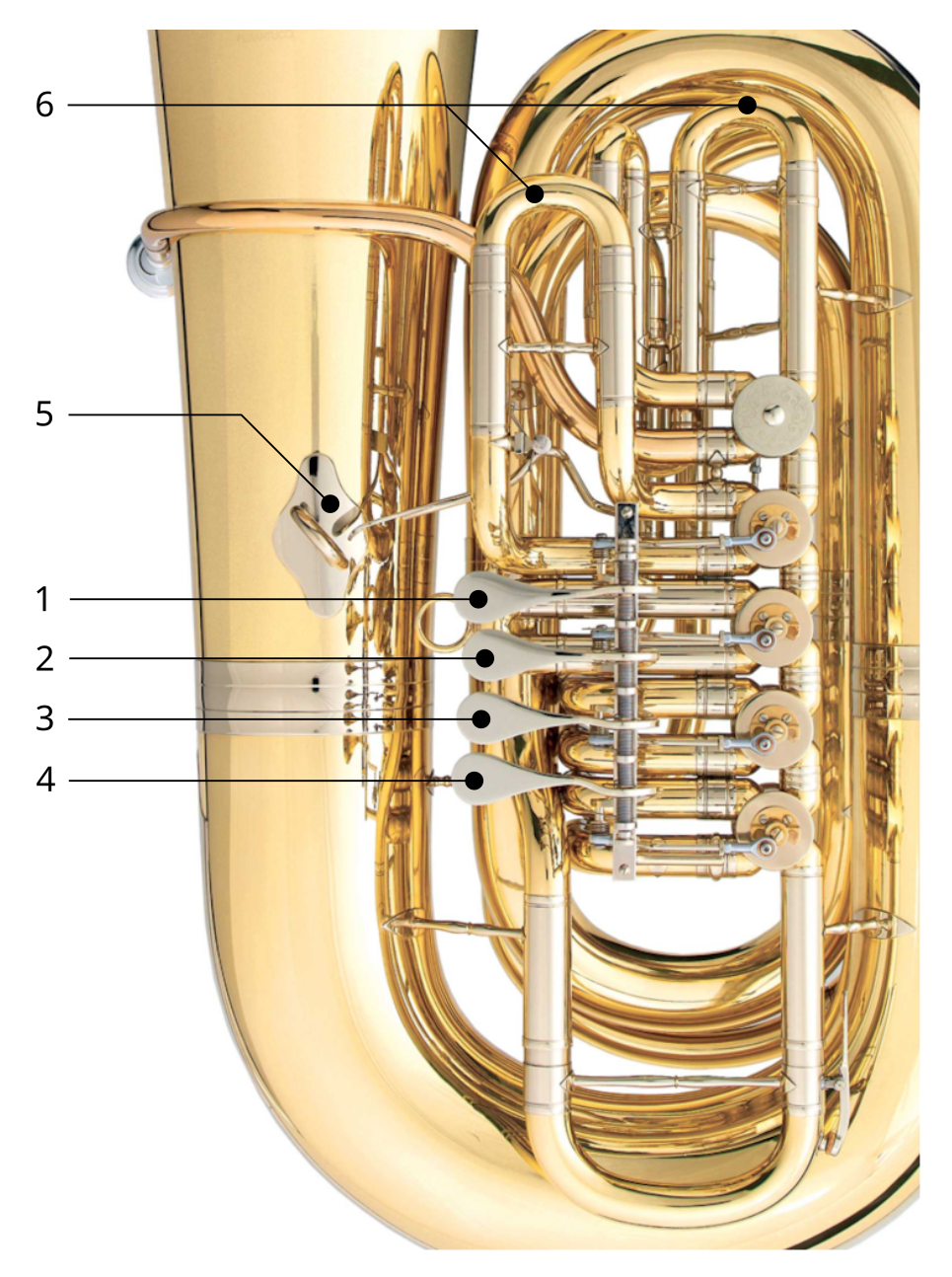
Detail of rotary valves on a B&S C tuba; 1-4. right-hand finger paddles for first-through-fourth valves; 5. fifth valve lever and thumb ring; 6. valve slides operated by left hand to adjust intonation

Modern tubas are made with either piston valves or rotary valves. Rotary valves, patented in Prussia by Joseph Riedl in 1835, were first used on Austro-Hungarian tubas made in the 1850s by Červený. Around the same time in France and Britain, the modern piston valve developed by François Périnet in 1839 had begun to replace the Berlin valves used on early saxhorn instruments.

Pistons can be top-action, oriented vertically so the buttons are operated from the top of the instrument, or front-action (sometimes called side-action), oriented horizontally so the buttons are at the front, operated from the side.

Tubas are made with three to six valves, but among professional players, tubas with four and five are the most common. Three-valve tubas are usually inexpensive student models, or smaller marching instruments made to conserve weight; the sousaphone usually has three valves. F tubas usually have five or six valves, including the six-valved Wienerkonzerttuba used in Austria.

Depressing a valve adds a length of tubing to the instrument, lowering its fundamental pitch. On modern tubas, the first three valves work the same way as other valved brass instruments: the first lowers the pitch by two semitones (whole step), the second by one semitone (half step), and the third by three semitones (minor third).

==== Fourth, fifth, and sixth valves ====
The fourth valve lowers the pitch by five semitones (a perfect fourth). The combination of valves 1 and 3 also lowers the pitch by a fourth, but this combination, and the 1-2-3 combination, tend to produce pitches that are slightly sharp. Using the fourth valve helps solve these intonation problems. Using the fourth valve with any or all of the first three extends the range down to the fundamental pitch, but some of these lower notes will be sharp.

The fifth and sixth valves, if fitted, provide alternative fingering possibilities to improve intonation, particularly in the octave between the fundamental pitch (pedal tone) and the second partial, and for smooth trills and ease of playing. Usually, the fifth valve is tuned to two and a half semitones (flattened whole step), and the sixth to one and a half semitones (flattened half step). On C tubas with five valves, the fifth valve may be tuned as a flattened whole step or as a minor third, depending on the instrument. B♭ instruments rarely have a fifth valve, but if they do, it is tuned similarly to that of a C tuba.

==== Compensating valves ====
Most high-end saxhorn-style tubas in E♭ and B♭, instead of providing a fifth or sixth valve, provide a compensating system on the fourth valve to adjust intonation when using valves in combination. This reduces the need to constantly adjust tuning slides while playing, and also simplifies fingering. The compensating piston valve was invented in the 1870s by David Blaikley (1846–1936), the factory manager at Boosey & Co., who patented it in 1878. The patent limited its application outside of Britain, and tubas with compensating valves are mainly found in Britain and British Commonwealth countries. The tubing of the fourth valve is re-routed back through the other three valves to add an extra set of small correcting tubing loops. This achieves correct intonation in the lower range of the instrument when using the fourth valve. Compensating valves can make the instrument significantly more "stuffy" or resistant to air flow when compared to a non-compensating tuba, and also make the instrument heavier.

=== Mouthpiece ===
The tuba mouthpiece is similar to that of other brass instruments. It has a cup-shaped profile with a throat at the base, and a short backbore in the shank, which fits into the leadpipe receiver on the instrument. The tuba requires a correspondingly larger mouthpiece, with a much deeper cup that usually measures 32 to 34 millimeters (1.18 to 1.34 inches) in diameter at the rim. A principal innovation in tuba mouthpiece design was introduced by August Helleberg in the early 1900s. Helleberg made his mouthpieces with a deeper, more funnel-shaped cup, which were later manufactured by C. G. Conn and have been widely copied since.

=== Materials and finish ===
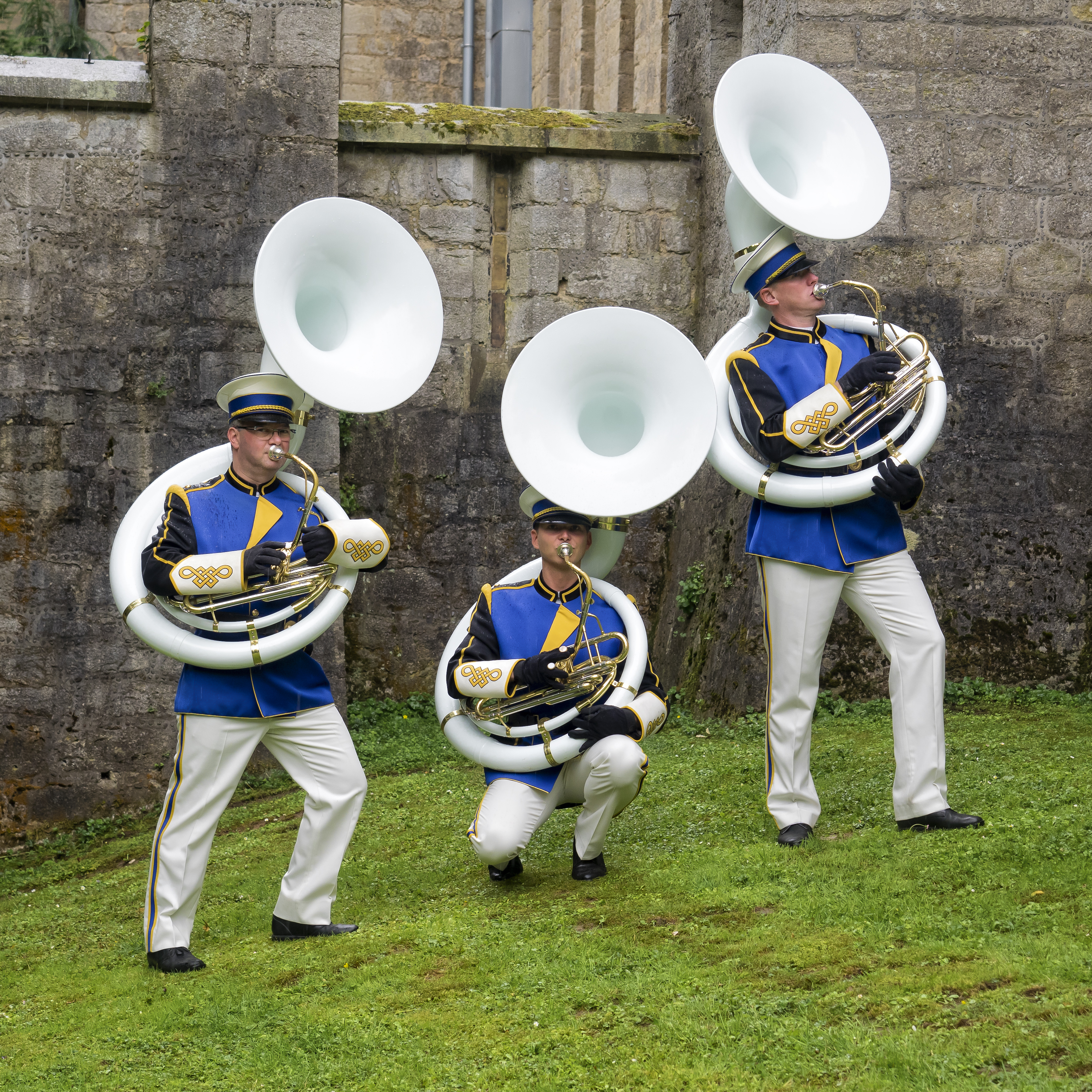
Euroband musicians with fiberglass sousaphones

The tuba is generally constructed of brass, which is either electroplated with silver or coated with a thin transparent lacquer. Unfinished brass will tarnish and must be periodically polished to maintain its appearance.

Tubas can be made of ABS plastic, or the bell and outer tubing can be made of fibreglass or carbon-fiber composite to reduce the weight of the instrument.. Sousaphones have been made with fiberglass bells since the 1960s. Reduced weight is helpful for instruments used for marching, and these materials allow the instrument to be produced in many colors.

=== Manufacturers ===
Tubas are built by many German makers, including Gebr. Alexander, B&S, Melton Meinl Weston, Miraphone, and Rudolf Meinl. The Besson company was acquired by Buffet Crampon in 2013 and moved operations from London and France to Germany. Other European makers include Schagerl in Austria, Willson in Switzerland, Amati Kraslice and Červený in the Czech Republic, and Adams in the Netherlands.

Several large Chinese instrument makers, concentrated in Tianjin and Beijing, produce relatively inexpensive musical instruments for export, including tubas and other band instruments. Other Asian manufacturers include Yamaha of Japan, and KHS Music in Taiwan, who manufacture several brands, including Jupiter student B♭ tubas and sousaphones, and a five-valve C tuba for XO Professional Brass.

In the United States, tubas built in the 1930s by Conn, Holton, York, and King became the templates for instruments subsequently built and used in most American bands and orchestras. By the 1980s, Conn-Selmer had become America's largest brass instrument maker, having acquired Vincent Bach, Holton, Leblanc, and King through a series of corporate mergers. In 2024, the US imported $560 million in Chinese-made instruments, mostly beginner and student models, making up 45% of all brass-wind instrument imports that year. Consolidation and competition from inexpensive Chinese imports has resulted in the cessation of nearly all tuba manufacturing in the United States. The California-based manufacturer Kanstul closed in 2019, and Conn-Selmer closed its manufacturing plant in Eastlake, Ohio in June 2026, moving its remaining tuba and band instrument manufacturing to China.

== Performance ==
A symphony orchestra typically includes a single tuba, although a second is sometimes called for in large works, such as Stravinsky's ballet The Rite of Spring (1913) or Havergal Brian's Symphony No. 1 (1927). The tuba serves as the bass of the orchestral brass section, and it can reinforce the bass voices of the strings and woodwinds. While French composers writing for the small C tuba wrote high lyrical passages such as Ravel's "Bydło" excerpt (see above), a single tuba can fortify the bass line of an orchestral tutti, such as the conclusion of "Jupiter, the Bringer of Jollity" from Holst's The Planets (1917).

Tuba excerpt from "Jupiter, the Bringer of Jollity" in Gustav Holst's suite The Planets (1917). Excerpt at 7m 55s.

Recording, by Skidmore College Orchestra

Concert bands and military bands usually employ two to four tubas as their principal bass instrument. British-style brass band music has two tuba parts, one each for E♭ and B♭ tuba. There are usually two players on each part, and parts can sometimes use divisi. Sousaphones and tubas are used in jazz bands, marching bands, and Mexican banda music. The contrabass bugle version of a tuba is used in drum and bugle corps.

In chamber music, the tuba provides the bass of the brass quintet, a genre first popularized in the 1950s by the Philip Jones Brass Ensemble and the New York Brass Quintet.

=== Notation ===
In orchestras and symphonic bands, the tuba is written at concert pitch in the bass clef as a non-transposing instrument. Tuba players reading music in bass clef must therefore learn the different valve fingerings for each size of tuba. Unlike other bass clef instruments like the trombone, cello, or bassoon, high passages for tuba are not written in tenor clef, and players are used to reading up to five leger lines above and below the bass staff.

In British brass bands, all instruments except the bass trombone are transposing instruments using the treble clef notation popularized in France by the instrument maker Adolphe Sax for his families of instruments. Thus the tuba parts are notated in treble clef, sounding an octave and a sixth below written for E♭ tuba, like the baritone saxophone, or two octaves and a second for B♭ tuba, like the contrabass clarinet. This allows band musicians to change instruments without having to learn new fingerings for the same written music.

Brass band transposing treble clef notation, and the resulting concert pitch for tubas in B♭ and E♭

Concert band music sometimes provides tuba parts in E♭ and B♭ treble clef as well, to accommodate players from either background, although professional players are usually familiar with either notation.

=== Range ===
The written range of the tuba is large, partly because different-sized instruments have been used at different times and in different regions. The C or B♭ contrabass tubas called for by Wagner and later German composers could scarcely reach middle C, while the range of the euphonium-like French C tuba built an octave higher reaches the C_{5} above middle C. On any tuba, the range from F_{1} to C_{4} (middle C) is easily accessible, but the full working range from contemporary solo repertoire includes the pedal range to at least B♭_{0}, and extends up to at least C_{5}.

The comfortable three-octave tessitura of tubas; higher notes are possible on the B♭ and C tubas, and pedal tones on the E♭ and F can extend their lower range

Higher notes are possible, since the upper range is limited only by the fitness of the player's embouchure, although notes above the bell cutoff frequency around the tenth harmonic are difficult to center; continuous glissandi are possible, making valve fingering largely redundant. The wide bore profile of the tuba means that pedal tones are easily produced, compared to other brass instruments.

=== Resonance and false tones ===
Some tubas have a strong, useful resonance that deviates from the instrument's principal harmonic series. For example, most large B♭ tubas have a strong resonance around the low E♭_{1} between the B♭_{0} pedal and its second partial an octave above. These alternative resonances are often known as false, factitious or privileged tones, and allow the instrument to play chromatically from E_{1} down to the B♭ pedal of the open horn using only three valves.

=== Microtonality ===
Contemporary repertoire can include the use of quarter tones and other microtonality. On the tuba, a microtonal valve system was first developed in 2009 by Robin Hayward (b. 1969) and the German manufacturer B&S. The "Hayward" system supplies interchangeable fifth (quarter tone) and sixth (eighth tone) valves, and extensions for the third and fourth valve slides, that can be used on a six-valve F or C tuba. This system is available as an option on some tuba models from B&S and Rudolf Meinl.

== Repertoire ==
Works for solo tuba were written soon after the invention of the Baß-Tuba in 1835. These include a Concertino (1837) by its co-inventor Wieprecht, a Fantaisie för Cromatisk Bas-Tuba (1837) by a Swedish bandmaster named Appelberg, and a Concertino (c. 1843) by Christian Gottlieb Müller. Subsequent 19th century works were often light popular solos, written for brass and concert band accompaniment. Often in the form of polka and trio, they follow the same structure as contemporaneous pieces for solo cornet and other instruments. Arrangements for tuba of Jean-Baptiste Arban's Variations on the Carnival of Venice (1864), a popular example of this type of piece, are still commonly performed and recorded. Other solo works, such as the Concertino (1860) by Otto Rosenberg and Concert (1860) by Louis Hässler, made considerable melodic and technical demands on the performer.

In 1945, the American composer George Kleinsinger wrote the children's play Tubby the Tuba for solo tuba, narrator and orchestra. Its popularity with audiences spawned several commercial recordings, a 1975 animated feature film, and arrangements for wind band and brass band accompaniment.

The 1950s saw a renewed interest in compositions for solo tuba. These include Waltz for Mippy III (1950) by Leonard Bernstein and Sonate für Baßtuba und Klavier (1955) by Paul Hindemith, both written for solo tuba with piano accompaniment. A considerable body of solo repertoire has subsequently amassed for tuba. This includes unaccompanied pieces, and in particular works with piano, ensemble, or band accompaniment.

The Concerto No. 1 (1947) for tuba was written by the Soviet tubist and composer Alexey Lebedev (1924–1993). The Concerto in F minor for Bass Tuba and Orchestra (1954) by the British composer Ralph Vaughan Williams remains a popular and often-performed concerto, with many commercial recordings. Increased awareness of the technical and sonic possibilities of solo tuba led to a growth in available concert repertoire. Tuba concertos soon followed from other composers, such as Gunther Schuller (1960), William Lovelock (1967), Edward Gregson (1978), Roger Steptoe (1983), John Williams (1985), Alexander Arutiunian (1992), and Eric Ewazen (1995). Schuller wrote his second tuba concerto, dedicated to the American tubist and scholar Harvey Phillips, in 2008. Since 2000, concertos have been written by Kalevi Aho (2001), Jan Bach (2003), Philip Sparke (2006), David Carlson (2014), Jennifer Higdon (2017), and the Norwegian composer Marcus Paus (Tuba Mirum, 2021).

The multi-instrumentalist Anthony Braxton composed his Composition No. 19 for 100 tubas in 1971, which was only premièred in 2006 in New York's World Financial Center Plaza. The difficulty in booking such a large number of players has meant it is seldom performed; its third performance took place in September 2026 at the Amisfield Park walled garden in Scotland.

== Bibliography ==
- Adler-McKean, Jack (2020). The Techniques of Tuba Playing (in multiple languages). Kassel: Bärenreiter. ISBN 978-3-7618-2421-4. OCLC 1201192145. Wikidata Q134349391.
- ——— (2022). "Serpents, Bombardons, and the 'Wiener' Tuba: Richard Wagner and the Evolution of the Orchestral Contrabass Labrosone". Historical Brass Society Journal. 34: 113–150.
- ——— (2024). "The Solo Tuba". Performance Research. 29 (6): 24–31. doi:10.1080/13528165.2024.2537555.
- Bevan, Clifford (1996); see Morris & Goldstein 1996.
- ——— (1997). "Special NEH report: Cimbasso Research and Performance Practice: An Update". In Carter, Stewart Arlen (ed.). Perspectives in Brass Scholarship: Proceedings of the International Historic Brass Symposium, Amherst, 1995. Bucina: The Historic Brass Society Series. Stuyvesant: Pendragon Press. p. 289–299. ISBN 978-0-945193-97-5. OCLC 37398029. Wikidata Q127092138.
- ——— (2000). The Tuba Family (2nd ed.). Winchester: Piccolo Press. ISBN 1-872203-30-2. OCLC 993463927. OL 19533420M. Wikidata Q111040769.
- Bogdanov, Vladimir; Woodstra, Chris; Erlewine, Stephen Thomas, eds. (2002). All Music Guide to Jazz: The Definitive Guide to Jazz (4th ed.). San Francisco: Backbeat Books. ISBN 978-0-87930-717-2. OL 8128522M. Wikidata Q132321183.
- Bone, Lloyd E.; Paull, Eric; Morris, R., eds. (2007). Guide to the Euphonium Repertoire: The Euphonium Source Book. Bloomington: Indiana University Press. ISBN 0-253-34811-0. Wikidata Q135963380.
  - Bowman, Brian. "Band and Orchestral Excerpts". In Bone, Paull & Morris (2007), pp. 251–255.
  - O'Connor, Michael. "A Short History of the Euphonium and Baritone Horn". In Bone, Paull & Morris (2007), pp. 1–17.
- Bowman, Brian (2007); see Bone, Paull & Morris 2007.
- Call, R. Stephen (1996); see Morris & Goldstein 1996.
- Cook, Richard; Morton, Brian, eds. (2004). The Penguin Guide to Jazz on CD (7th ed.). Penguin Books. ISBN 978-0-14-101416-6. OCLC 468362981. OL 7358385M. Wikidata Q126705461.
- Davis, Ronald (2006); see Morris & Perantoni 2006.
- Graves, David D. (2006); see Morris & Perantoni 2006.
- Herbert, Trevor; Myers, Arnold; Wallace, John, eds. (2019). The Cambridge Encyclopedia of Brass Instruments. Cambridge University Press. doi:10.1017/9781316841273. ISBN 978-1-316-63185-0. OL 34730943M. Wikidata Q136027509.
- Kennan, Kent; Grantham, Donald (2023). The Technique of Orchestration (7th ed.). New York: Routledge. doi:10.4324/9781003130680. ISBN 978-0-367-67296-6. LCCN 2022053871. Wikidata Q137766238.
- Lenburg, Jeff (2009). The Encyclopedia of Animated Cartoons (3rd ed.). New York: Checkmark Books. ISBN 978-0-8160-6600-1. OL 11360480M. Wikidata Q139487659.
- Meucci, Renato (1996). "The Cimbasso and Related Instruments in 19th-Century Italy". The Galpin Society Journal. 49. Translated by Waterhouse, William: 143–179. JSTOR 842397. Wikidata Q111077162.
- Morris, R.; Goldstein, Edward R., eds. (1996). The Tuba Source Book. Bloomington: Indiana University Press. ISBN 978-0-253-32889-2. OCLC 31737584. Wikidata Q135911601.
  - Bevan, Clifford. "A Brief History of the Tuba". In Morris & Goldstein (1996), pp. 51–63.
  - Call, R. Steven. "The Tuba in Jazz: A Historical View". In Morris & Goldstein (1996), pp. 529–532.
- Morris, R.; Perantoni, Daniel, eds. (2006). Guide to the Tuba Repertoire: The New Tuba Source Book. Bloomington: Indiana University Press. ISBN 978-0-253-34763-3. LCCN 2006005242. OCLC 704679837. Wikidata Q135911410.
  - Davis, Ronald. "Discography". In Morris & Perantoni (2006), pp. 477–614.
  - Graves, David D. "Methods and Studies". In Morris & Perantoni (2006), pp. 435–462.
  - Northcut, Timothy J. "Music for Tuba and Band". In Morris & Perantoni (2006), pp. 151–172.
  - Northcut, Timothy J.; Gray, Skip. "Music for Tuba and Orchestra". In Morris & Perantoni (2006), pp. 173–187.
  - Sinder, Philip; Funderburk, Jeffrey L. "Music for Unaccompanied Tuba". In Morris & Perantoni (2006), pp. 217–247.
  - Skillen, Joseph; Goldstein, Edward R. "Music for Tuba and Keyboard". In Morris & Perantoni (2006), pp. 1–149.
- Myers, Arnold (2000). "Instruments and Instrumentation". In Herbert, Trevor (ed.). The British Brass Band: A Musical and Social History. Oxford University Press. pp. 155–186. ISBN 978-0-19-159012-2. OCLC 51682765. Wikidata Q116480763.
- Northcut, Timothy J. (2006); see Morris & Perantoni 2006.
- Northcut, Timothy J., Gray, Skip (2006); see Morris & Perantoni 2006.
- O'Connor, Michael (2007); see Bone, Paull & Morris 2007.
- Pirtle, Scooter (2002). "The evolution of the bugle". In Vickers, Steve (ed.). A History of Drum & Bugle Corps. Vol. 1. Madison: Sights & Sounds. pp. 63–90. OCLC 50171582. Wikidata Q136465477.
- Quinones, Lawrence Samuel (2025). The Perfect Tuba: Forging Fulfillment from the Bass Horn, Band, and Hard Work. New York: Bloomsbury Publishing. ISBN 978-1-63973-548-8. OCLC 1537965188. OL 60993840M. Wikidata Q136771010.
- Sinder, Philip; Funderburk, Jeffrey L. (2006); see Morris & Perantoni (2006).
- Sisk, Robin A. (2017). Three 21st Century Tuba Concertos for British-Style Brass Band: Performance Considerations for the Solo Tubist (Doctor of Musical Arts thesis). University of Hartford. Wikidata Q137209576.
- Skillen, Joseph; Goldstein, Edward R. (2006); see Morris & Perantoni (2006).
- Yeo, Douglas (2021). An Illustrated Dictionary for the Modern Trombone, Tuba, and Euphonium Player. Dictionaries for the Modern Musician. Illustrator: Lennie Peterson. Lanham: Rowman & Littlefield. ISBN 978-1-5381-5966-8. LCCN 2021020757. OCLC 1249799159. OL 34132790M. Wikidata Q111040546.
