= Wagner tuba =

Brass instrument related to tubas and French horns

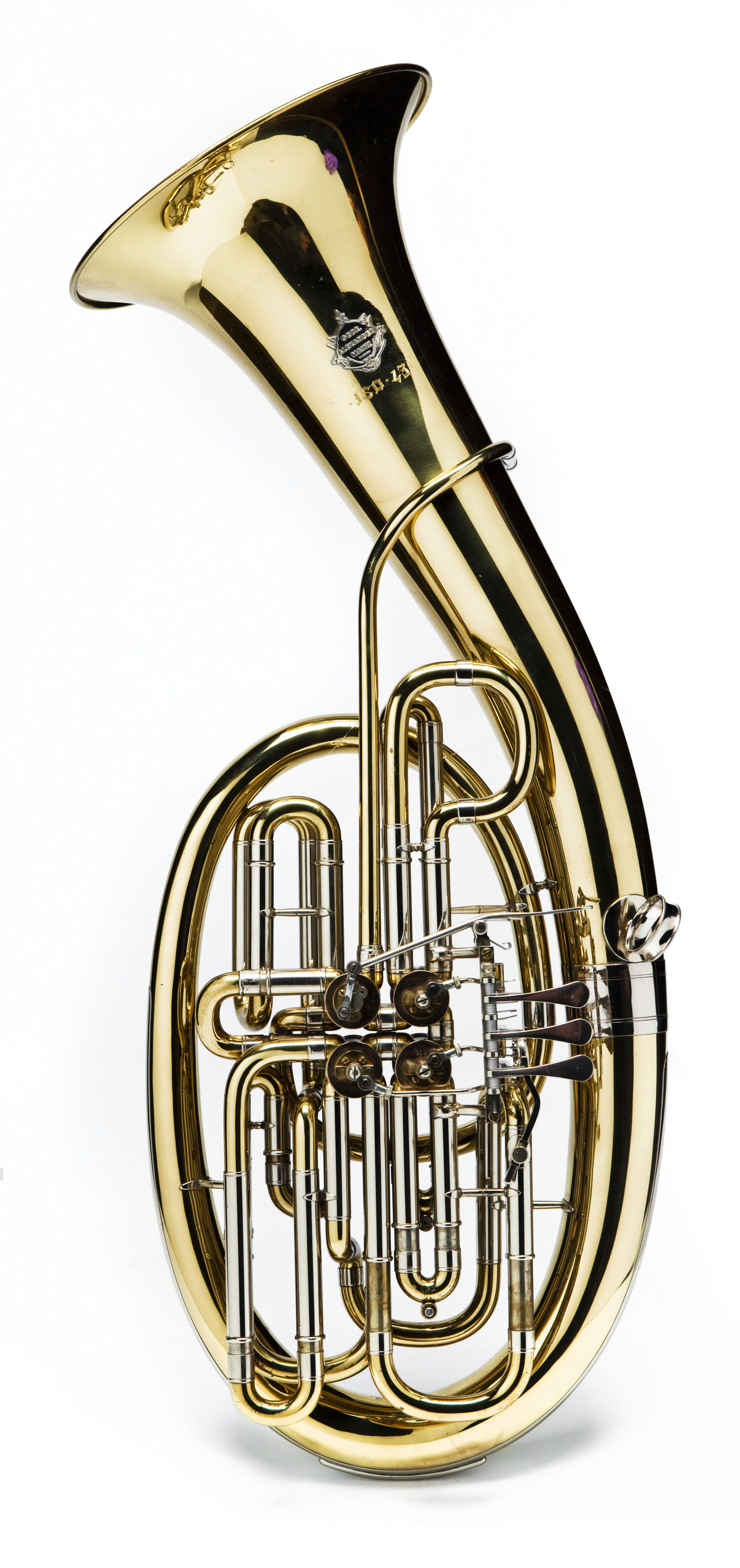
- Wagner tuba in B♭ and F by Gebr. Alexander

Brass instrument
- Other names: en: Wagner tuba, de: Wagnertuba, it: Tuba wagneriana, fr: Tuba wagnérien
- Classification: Wind; Brass; Aerophone

Related instruments
- French horn; Tuba; Euphonium

The Wagner tuba is a four-valve brass instrument commissioned by and named after Richard Wagner. It combines technical features of both standard tubas and French horns, though despite its name, the Wagner tuba is more similar to the latter, and is usually played by horn players. Wagner commissioned the instrument for his four-part opera cycle Der Ring des Nibelungen, where its purpose was to bridge the acoustical and textural gap between the French horn and trombone.

The sound produced by this instrument has been variously described as "smoky", "metallic", "unearthly" and "majestic". Wagner tubas (or Tenortuben and Basstuben) are also referred to as Wagnertuben, Waldhorntuben, Bayreuth-tuben, Ring-tuben, or Horn-tuben by German writers, but it is most common to refer to them in English as Wagner tubas. Wagner's published scores usually refer to these instruments in the plural, Tuben, but sometimes in the singular, Tuba.

== History ==
The Wagner tuba was originally created for Richard Wagner's operatic cycle Der Ring des Nibelungen, which was based on Nordic mythology. He was attempting to perfect the Valhalla leitmotif, for this was the first opera in which he attempted to conceive pitch, rhythm, and instrumentation in a single step. He first planned to use trombones for the motif, but ultimately decided to create new instruments, which he called Tuben. He planned to use four pairs of French horn players; the last two pairs would double on the new instruments, a pair pitched in F (bass tuben) and a pair in B♭ (tenor tuben). Wagner wished to obtain a sound that would invoke Norse legends and create a better blend in the brass section. He sought an instrument that had the sound of a lur, which is an ancient Nordic natural horn. In 1797, archaeologists had unearthed ancient lurs that were still in playable condition. Through this, Wagner knew it was the sound he was searching for, but the natural horns were not chromatic. This meant that Wagner needed the flexibility of a saxhorn, which was a valved instrument that allowed for chromatic range.

In 1853, Wagner visited the shop of Adolphe Sax, the inventor of the saxophone and saxhorn. The saxhorn had a more cylindrical and larger bore, and used the parabolic cupped mouthpiece (such as on a trombone); it thus had a more brassy tone that was not quite suitable for Wagner's tonal intent. Instead, Wagner's desired aural effect was obtained by a conical bore, similar to a horn, and the use of the horn mouthpiece (tapered and conical, as opposed to the parabolic cup mouthpiece). Finally, with the help of the C. W. Moritz firm in Berlin, Wagner was able to develop his idea into a finished product. Another important figure in the development of the Wagner tuba was Belgian writer and musician Victor-Charles Mahillon. He designed a Wagner tuba to be specifically played by trombonists, contrasting with Adolphe Sax's Wagner tuba that is intended to be played by horn players.

Since that time other composers have written for the instrument, most notably Anton Bruckner, whose Symphony No. 7 employs a quartet of them, first heard in the slow movement in memory of Wagner; and Richard Strauss, who composed several works that used the Wagner tuba, including his Alpine Symphony.

The Paxman Musical Instruments horn manufacturer continues to produce Wagner tubas in F and B♭. The workshop of Engelbert Schmid also produces Wagner tubas. Some other companies that manufacture Wagner tubas include Hans Hoyer, Wessex, and Alexander.

== Design ==
The Wagner tuba is built with rotary valves, which (like those on the horn) are played with the left hand. Horn players traditionally double on Wagner tubas because the mouthpiece and fingering are identical, though the size of the bore of the Wagner tuba is midway between that of a euphonium and a horn. The Wagner tuba's bore size is similar to that of a cornophone, which results in a similar sound.

The Wagner tuba nominally exists in two sizes, tenor in B♭ and bass in F, with ranges comparable to those of horns in the same pitches while being less adept at the highest notes. Several 20th-century and later manufacturers have, however, combined the two instruments into a double Wagner tuba that can easily be configured in either B♭ or F.

Wagner tubas are normally written as transposing instruments, but the notation used varies considerably and is a common source of confusion—Wagner himself used three different and incompatible notations in the course of the Ring, and all three of these systems (plus some others) have been used by subsequent composers.

An additional source of confusion is that the instruments are invariably designated in orchestral scores simply as tubas, sometimes leaving it unclear whether the score means true bass tubas or Wagner tubas. (For example, orchestras sometimes assume the two tenor tubas in Leoš Janáček's Sinfonietta are Wagner tubas, but the intended instrument is the euphonium.)

The name "Wagner tuba" is considered problematic, and possibly incorrect, by many theorists. Kent Kennan says they are poorly named, for "they are really modified horns" rather than actual tubas.

== Impact ==
Composers such as Wagner who made use of this instrument would later inspire future composers to also write for the Wagner tuba. Wagner tubas appear in the work of composers such as Richard Strauss, Anton Bruckner, Béla Bartók, and many more. Anton Bruckner employed Wagner tubas in his Seventh, Eighth and Ninth Symphonies. In these symphonies, the four Wagner tubas are played by players who alternate between French horn and Wagner tuba, which is the same procedure Wagner used in the Ring. This change is simplified by the fact that the horn and Wagner tuba use the same mouthpiece and same fingering.

As time passed, the availability and convenience of including Wagner tubas in concert programs became a reoccurring problem. In the 20th century, prominent composers such as Arnold Schoenberg and Igor Stravinsky began to write sparingly for the instrument, while other composers attempted to continue writing for it in the 1960s. These composers would continue to face the same difficulties as their predecessors, which would ultimately lead to composers avoiding writing for the instrument altogether.

Rued Langgaard, a great admirer of Bruckner, wrote for eight horns in his First Symphony (1908–1911); four of these parts were written for tenor and bass Wagner tubas. When this work was eventually premiered, the orchestra decided against using Wagner tubas, instead playing the parts on horn. This experience led a frustrated Langgaard to exclude Wagner tubas from future works.

== Repertoire ==
Wagner tubas are typically played by players who are also playing a horn. In an orchestral score, the staves for the Wagner tubas then logically go below those of the horns and above the standard tubas. If they are played by players who are not also playing a horn, they are placed below the trombones, above the regular tuba, which is then called a "contrabass tuba".

These composers have written for the instrument:

- Thomas Adès
- Béla Bartók
- Anton Bruckner
- Friedrich Cerha
- Stephen Caudel
- Andrew Downes
- Felix Draeseke
- Alberto Franchetti, Germania
- Jerry Goldsmith
- Sofia Gubaidulina
- Hans Werner Henze
- Leoš Janáček
- Jan Koetsier, Elegie for Wagner Tuba and String Quartet/Orchestra
- Rued Langgaard
- George Lopez, Gonzales the Earth Eater (1 Wagner tuba) and Traumzeit und Traumdeutung (2 Wagner tubas)
- Elisabeth Lutyens
- John Melby
- Michael Nyman
- Alex Prior
- Einojuhani Rautavaara
- Eurico Carrapatoso
- Esa-Pekka Salonen
- Peter Schat, An Indian Requiem (2 Wagner tubas)
- Arnold Schoenberg
- Ragnar Søderlind
- Richard Strauss
- Vladimir Tarnopolsky, Wahnfried (6 Wagner tubas)
- Ricardo Matosinhos
- Robert Davidson
- Igor Stravinsky
- Edgard Varèse
- Richard Wagner
- Alec Wilder
- John Williams
- Bernd Alois Zimmermann
