= Pedal tone =

Brass instrument notes

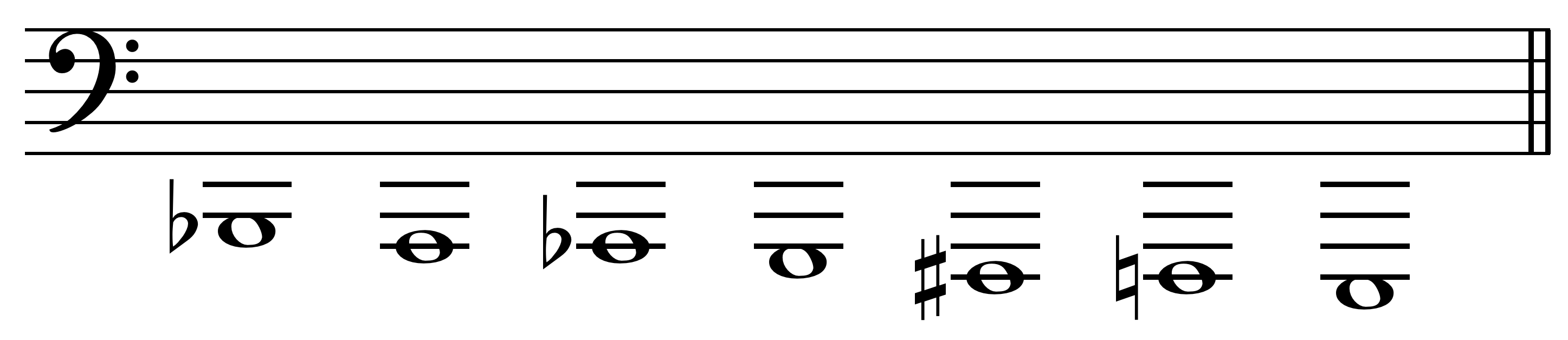
Trombone slide position "pedal tones"

Pedal tone demonstration
Demonstration of pedal tones on the trombone. The first two notes are B♭3 and B♭2, and the last note is a pedal B♭1.

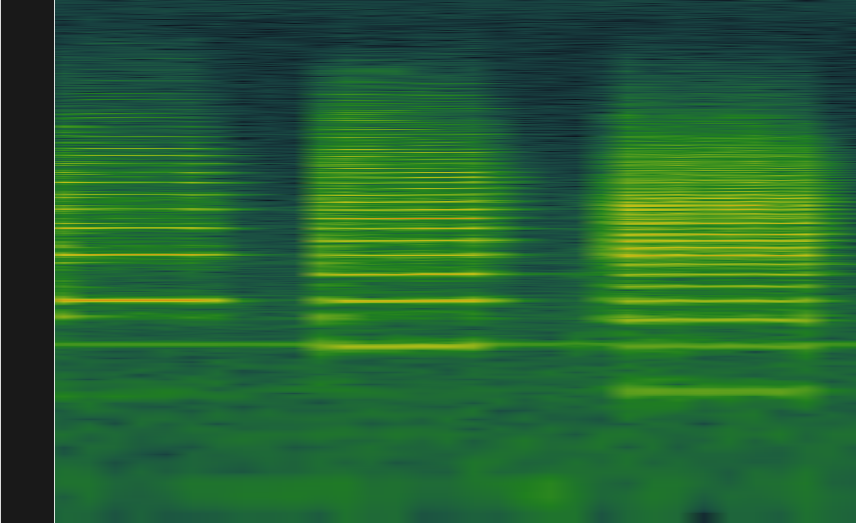
Spectrogram of the above recording

Pedal tones or "pedals" are special low notes on brass instruments that sound at the fundamental tone of the instrument's harmonic series. The name pedal comes from the pedal keyboard of a pipe organ, played with the feet to sound the 16′ and 32′ contrabass registers. Brasses with a bell do not naturally vibrate at this frequency.

A closed cylinder vibrates at only the odd members of its harmonic series. This set of pitches is too sparse to be musically useful for brass instruments; therefore, the bells and mouthpieces of brasses are crafted to adjust these pitches. The bell significantly raises all pitches in the series, particularly on the low end, while the mouthpiece lowers the higher harmonics, limiting the amount to which higher harmonics are raised by the bell. The resulting compressed set of pitches resembles a new harmonic series that includes the even members. This new series is similar to that of a stopped conical tube, with the exception of the fundamental, which is no longer incorporated in the harmonic series.

The original fundamental resonance is not raised all the way to the new fundamental pitch, and is not used in playing. The new fundamental can be played, however, as a pedal tone. The higher resonances of the new series help the lips vibrate at the fundamental frequency and allow the pitch to sound. The resulting tone relies heavily on overtones for its perception, but in the hands of a skilled player, pedal tones can be controlled and can sound characteristic to the instrument.

On trombone, pedal B♭1 is frequently seen in commercial scoring but much less often in symphonic music. Notes below B♭ are called for only rarely as they "become increasingly difficult to produce and insecure in quality" with A♭1 or G1 being the bottom limit for most trombonists.

Pedal tones are called for occasionally in advanced brass repertoire, particularly in that of the trombone and especially the bass trombone. Although not frequently used, pedal tones can often be played on a didgeridoo.
