= Wilhelm Friedrich Wieprecht =

German conductor (1802–1872)

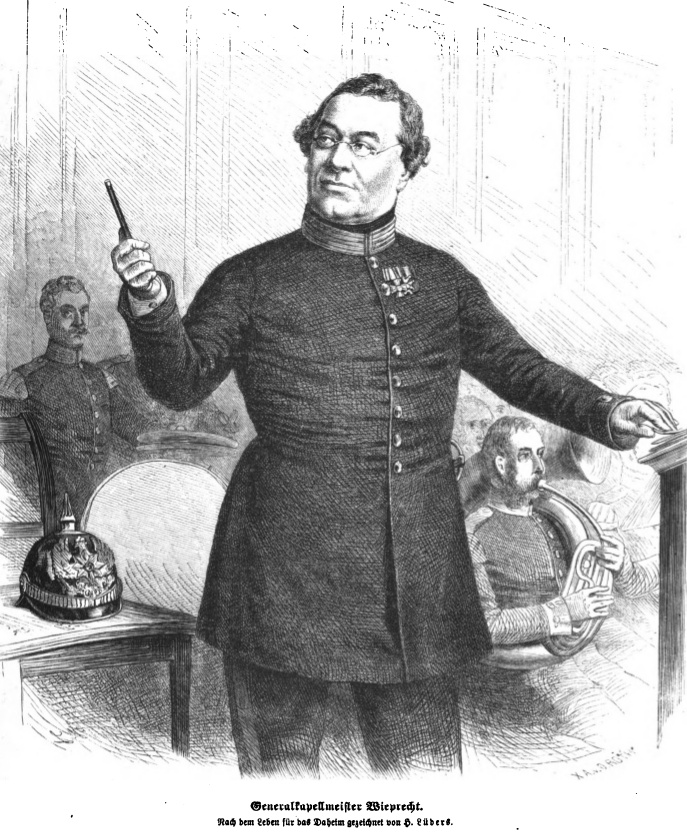
Wilhelm Wieprecht (1868)

Wilhelm Friedrich Wieprecht (8 August 1802 – 4 August 1872) was a German musical conductor, composer and inventor.

== Early life ==
Wieprecht was born at Aschersleben, where he was the oldest son to town musician, Friedrich Jacob Wieprecht. His father was a cavalryman and trumpet player in the Quitzow Carbine Regiment. According to his autobiography, from a young age Wieprecht learned from his father to play on nearly all wind instruments. It was in violin-playing, however, that his father particularly wished him to excel; and in 1819 he went to Dresden, where he studied composition and the violin to such good purpose that a year later he was given a position in the city orchestra of Leipzig, playing also in those of the opera and the famous Gewandhaus. Asides playing the violin and clarinet in the orchestra, he also gave solo performances on the trombone.

In 1824 he went to Berlin, where he became a member of the royal orchestra, and was in the same year appointed chamber musician to the king. His residence at Berlin gave Wieprecht ample opportunity for the exercise of his genius for military music, on which his fame mainly rests. Several of his marches were early adopted by the regimental bands, and a more ambitious military composition attracted the attention of Gasparo Spontini, at whose house he became an intimate guest.

== Later career ==
He later began to study acoustics in order to correct the deficiencies in military musical instruments. As a result, he improved the valves of the brass instruments by constructing them on more sound acoustic principles, greatly increasing the volume and purity of their tone. Together with the instrument builder Johann Gottfried Moritz, he also invented the bass tuba, or bombardon, in order to give greater richness and power to the bass parts. In recognition of these inventions he was, in 1835, honoured by the Royal Academy of Berlin. His improved brass instruments worked in tandem with his German military band instrumentation, and was respected for it in New York during the civil war.

In 1838 he was appointed by the Prussian government director-general of all the guards' bands, and in recognition of the magnificent performance by massed bands on the occasion of the emperor Nicholas I's visit the same year, was awarded a special uniform. In 1843 he became director-general of the bands of the 10th Confederate army corps, and from this time exercised a profound influence on the development of military music throughout Germany, and beyond.

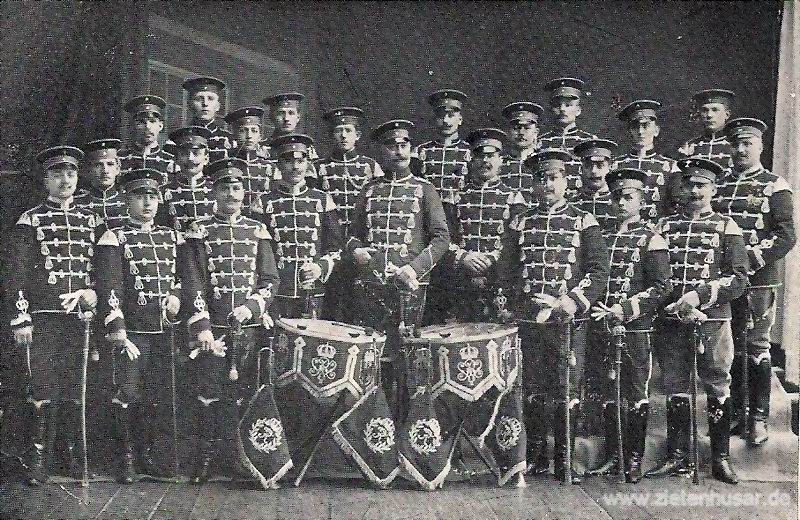
The mounted band of the 3. Prussian Hussars "von Ziethen"

He was the first to arrange the symphonies and overtures of the classical masters for military instruments, and to organize those outdoor performances of concert pieces by military bands which have done so much to popularize band music in Germany and elsewhere. The performance arranged by him of Beethoven's "Battle of Vittoria", in which the bugle calls were given by trumpeters stationed in various parts of the garden and the cannon shots were those of real guns, created immense sensation.

Besides the great work he accomplished in Germany, in 1847 he reorganized the military music in Turkey and, in 1852, in Guatemala. He composed military songs as well as numerous marches, and contributed frequently on his favourite subject to the Berlin musical papers. Wieprecht was a man of genial, kindly and generous nature, and was associated with many charitable foundations established for the benefit of poor musicians. Ludwig Bussler was one of his pupils. Of the hundreds of mounted military bands reformed by Wieprecht or influenced by his ideas, only the Life Guards' Dragoon Music Corps in Stockholm remains.

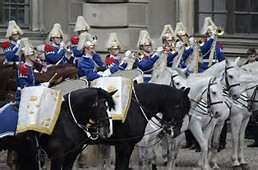
The Life Guards' Dragoon Music Corps on parade

== Death ==
Wieprecht died on 4 August 1872 in Berlin.

== Works for military band ==
- Armee-Marsch Nr. 133
- Drei Märsche zur Einholung des Prinzen und der Prinzessin Friedrich Wilhelm von Preußen
- Einholungsmarsch (für den Antritt von Friedrich Wilhelm IV. am 21. September 1840 in Berlin)
- Friedrike-Gossmann-Polka
- Grand Pas-Redoublé I und II
- Huldigungsmarsch
- Konzert für Klarinette
- Marsch für Kavallerie Nr. 21
- Marsch für Kavallerie Nr. 30
- Mein erster Defiliermarsch
- Militairische Trauerparade
- Musikalische Erinnerungen an die Kriegsjahre 1813, 1814, 1815
- Ouvertüre Militair
- Pastillons-Polka
- Sechs Märsche für Kavalleriemusik
- Triumphmarsch nach Themen des 5. Klavierkonzerts Es-Dur von Ludwig van Beethoven
- Wilhelmsmarsch
- 40 Parademärsche für Cavallerie
- 31 Defiliermärsche für die Infanterie

== Literature ==
- Armeemärsche Band 1, Toeche-Mittler J., Förlag W. Spemann Stuttgart 1980
