= 1892 in music =

Events in the year 1892 in music.

== Specific locations ==
- 1892 in Norwegian music

== Events ==
- April 28 – Jean Sibelius conducts the world première of his Kullervo Symphony in Helsinki.
- May 26 – A statue of Felix Mendelssohn, by Werner Stein, is dedicated at St. Thomas Church, Leipzig. Removed by the Nazis in the 1930s, it is re-dedicated in 2008.
- August 1 – Jef Denyn presents the world's first carillon concert at St. Rumbold's Cathedral in Mechelen, Belgium.
- September 24 – Opening of the Theater Unter den Linden, Berlin with Adolf Ferron's operetta Daphne and Gaul and Haßreiter's ballet Die Welt in Bild und Tanz.
- September 26 – Antonín Dvořák arrives in the United States to take up his post as artistic director of the National Conservatory of Music.
- December 18
  - Anton Bruckner's Symphony No. 8 in C minor is premiered by the Vienna Philharmonic with Hans Richter conducting at the Stadttheater, Leipzig.
  - December 6 O.S. – Pyotr Ilyich Tchaikovsky's ballet The Nutcracker and opera Iolanta are premiered in a double bill at the Imperial Mariinsky Theatre in Saint Petersburg, Russia.
- "After the Ball" becomes the first sheet music to sell over 1 million copies (for a single publisher in a single year).
- Erik Satie composes his first pieces in his own compositional system.
- Sergei Diaghilev graduates from the Saint Petersburg Conservatory.
- Ferdinand Praeger's controversial biography Wagner As I Knew Him is published posthumously in London.
- Sudrophone patented by François Sudre in France.

== Published popular music ==
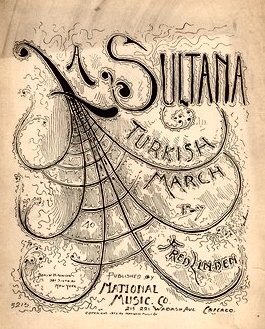
- "After the Ball" w.m. Charles K. Harris
- "The Bowery" w. Charles H. Hoyt m. Percy Gaunt
- "Daddy Wouldn't Buy Me a Bow Wow" w.m. Joseph Tabrar
- "Daisy Bell" (aka "A Bicycle Built For Two") w.m. Harry Dacre
- "Flanagan" w.m. C. W. Murphy & William Letters
- "Future Mrs. 'Awkins" by Albert Chevalier
- "The Holy City" w. Frederic Edward Weatherly m. Stephen Adams
- "La Sultana Turkish March" m. Fred Linden
- "Liebestraum Nocturne" m. Virginia Field
- "Molly And I And The Baby" w.m. Harry Kennedy
- "My Old Dutch" w. Albert Chevalier m. Charles Ingle
- "My Sweetheart's The Man In The Moon" w.m. James Thornton
- "The Sweetest Story Ever Told" w.m. R. M. Stults
- "The Virginia Skedaddle" w.m. Monroe H. Rosenfeld

== Recorded popular music ==
- "Daddy Wouldn't Buy Me a Bow-wow " – Dan W. Quinn
- "Daddy Wouldn't Buy Me a Bow-wow " – Silas Leachman
- "Esquimeau Dance" – William Tuson
- "Grover Cleveland March" – Gilmore's Band
- "Michael Casey At The Telephone" – Russell Hunting
- "Michael Casey Taking The Census" – Russell Hunting
- "Pat Brady as President" – Dan Kelly
- "Parody of "We'll Never Turn His Picture Toward The Wall'" – Al Reeves
- "Riding through the Glen" – Issler's Orchestra
- "Take Your Time Gentlemen" – Press Eldridge
- "The Blind Boy" – Richard Jose
- "The Bowery" – Dan W. Quinn
- "The Laughing Darkie" – George W. Johnson (singer)
- "The Night Alarm" – Holding's Military Band
- "The Old Folks at Home" – Len Spencer
- "Uncle Ned's Dream" – George W. Johnson (singer)

== Classical music ==
- Johannes Brahms – Intermezzos Opus number 117
- Edward Elgar – Serenade for Strings, Op. 20
- Alexander Glazunov – String Quintet in A major (Opus 39)
- Gustav Mahler – Das himmlische Leben (later incorporated into his fourth symphony)
- Miguel Marqués – El Centinelo
- Carl Nielsen – First Symphony
- Joseph Parry – Saul of Tarsus (oratorio)
- Sergei Rachmaninoff
  - Prelude in C-sharp Minor
  - Piano Concerto No. 1 in F-sharp minor, Op. 1
- Max Reger
  - Cello Sonata No. 1, Op. 5
  - Twelve Waltz-Caprices, Op. 9, four-hand piano
  - 20 German Dances, Op. 10, four-hand piano
- Alexander Scriabin – Piano Sonata No. 1 in F minor, opus 6
- Jean Sibelius – Kullervo Symphony
- Josef Suk – Serenade for Strings in E-flat major
- Alexander von Zemlinsky – Symphony in D minor

== Opera ==
- Herman Bemberg – Elaine
- Karel Bendl – Dite Tabora
- Alfredo Catalani – La Wally
- Gialdino Gialdini – I due soci premiered February 24 at the Teatro Brunetti, Bologna
- Umberto Giordano – Mala Vita
- Isidore de Lara – The Light of Asia
- Ruggiero Leoncavallo – I Pagliacci
- Jules Massenet – Werther (Composed 1887)
- Adolf Neuendorff – The Minstrel
- Pyotr Ilyich Tchaikovsky – Iolanta
- The World's Fair Colored Opera Company, with featured singer, soprano Matilda Sissieretta Jones are the first African-American performers to appear at Carnegie Hall

== Ballet ==
- Pyotr Ilyich Tchaikovsky – The Nutcracker

== Musical theater ==
- Blue-Eyed Susan, libretto by George Robert Sims, on London stage
- "Maid Marian" (retitled version of "Robin Hood"); London production
- "Maid Marian" (sequel to "Robin Hood"); Broadway production
- The Wicklow Postman; initial production in Boston, Massachusetts

== Top hits ==
- "Slide, Kelly, Slide" by George J. Gaskin
- "Sally in Our Alley" by Manhansett Quartette

== Births ==
- January 1 – Artur Rodziński, Polish conductor (d. 1958)
- January 31 – Eddie Cantor, born Isidore Itzkowitz, American singer and entertainer (d. 1964)
- February 4 – Yrjö Kilpinen, Finnish composer known most for his lieder (d. 1959)
- February 15 – Ján Valašťan Dolinský, Slovak composer (d. 1965)
- March 10
  - Arthur Honegger, composer (d. 1955)
  - Eva Turner, operatic soprano (d. 1990)
- March 27 – Ferde Grofé, composer (d. 1972)
- April 1 – Renato Zanelli, Chilean baritone, later tenor (d. 1935)
- April 2 – Roy Palmer, jazz trombonist (d. 1962)
- April 10 – Victor de Sabata, conductor and composer (d. 1967)
- April 12 – Johnny Dodds, jazz clarinetist (d. 1940)
- April 15 – Manuel Quiroga, violinist (d. 1961)
- April 19 – Germaine Tailleferre, composer (d. 1983)
- April 21 – Jaroslav Kvapil, composer (d. 1958)
- May 14 – Arthur Lourié, Russian-born expatriate composer (d. 1966)
- May 18 – Ezio Pinza, Italian bass singer and actor (d. 1957)
- May 19 – Pops Foster, jazz bass player (d. 1969)
- June 6 – Ted Lewis, singer and bandleader (d. 1971)
- June 18 – Eduard Steuermann, pianist (d. 1964)
- June 21 – Hilding Rosenberg, Swedish composer (d. 1985)
- June 23 – Mieczysław Horszowski, Polish pianist (d. 1993)
- June 30 – László Lajtha, Hungarian symphonist (d. 1963)
- July 2 – Jack Hylton, British bandleader (d. 1965)
- July 8 – J. Russel Robinson, dixieland pianist-composer (d. 1963)
- July 10 – Ján Móry, Slovak composer (d. 1978)
- July 26 – Philipp Jarnach, composer of German-French origins (d. 1982)
- August 14 – Kaikhosru Shapurji Sorabji, composer, music critic and pianist (d. 1988)
- August 15 – Knud Jeppesen, musicologist (d. 1974)
- September 4 – Darius Milhaud, composer (d. 1974)
- September 5 – Joseph Szigeti, violinist (d. 1973)
- September 17 – Hendrik Andriessen, Dutch composer and organist (d. 1981)
- September 26 – Georgios Poniridis, Greek composer and violinist (d. 1982)
- October 17 – Herbert Howells, church music composer (d. 1983)
- October 19 – Ilmari Hannikainen, composer (d. 1955)
- October 25 – Janszieka (Jennie) Deutsch and Roszicka (Rosie) Deutsch, Hungarian-born dancers, actresses and singers, billed as the Dolly sisters (d. 1941 and 1970 respectively)
- November 11 – Isidor Achron, Polish-American pianist and composer (d. 1948)
- November 28 – Thomas Wood, English composer (d. 1950)
- December 9 – Beatrice Harrison, cellist (d. 1965)
- December 11 – Giacomo Lauri-Volpi, operatic tenor (d. 1979)

== Deaths ==
- January 10 – Heinrich Dorn, German conductor, composer and journalist (born 1804)
- February 13 – Lambert Massart, violinist (born 1811)
- February 20 – Róza Csillag, opera singer (born 1832)
- March 11 – Caroline Reinagle, pianist, composer and writer (born 1818)
- March 20 – [[Arthur Thomas (composer)<Arthur Thomas]], composer (born 1850) (suicide)
- April 22 – Édouard Lalo, composer (born 1823)
- May 2 – Wilhelm Rust, composer (born 1822)
- May 6 – Ernest Guiraud, composer (born 1837)
- June 5 – Robert Rees, Welsh tenor (born 1841)
- August 18 – Jules Perrot, ballet dancer (born 1810)
- August 19 – František Zdeněk Skuherský, composer, teacher and music theorist (born 1830)
- September 5 – Henry Christian Timm, pianist, conductor and composer (born 1811)
- September 24 – Patrick Gilmore, bandmaster and composer (born 1829)
- October 24 – Robert Franz, composer (born 1815)
- October 28 – Felix Otto Dessoff, conductor and composer (born 1835)
- November 4 – Hervé, organist and composer (born 1825)
- November 19 – Antonio Torres Jurado, guitar maker (born 1817)
- date unknown – Adolf Rzepko, Polish composer, oboist, choral and orchestral conductor and pianist (born 1825)
