= Contrabass trombone =

Lowest-pitched instrument in the trombone family

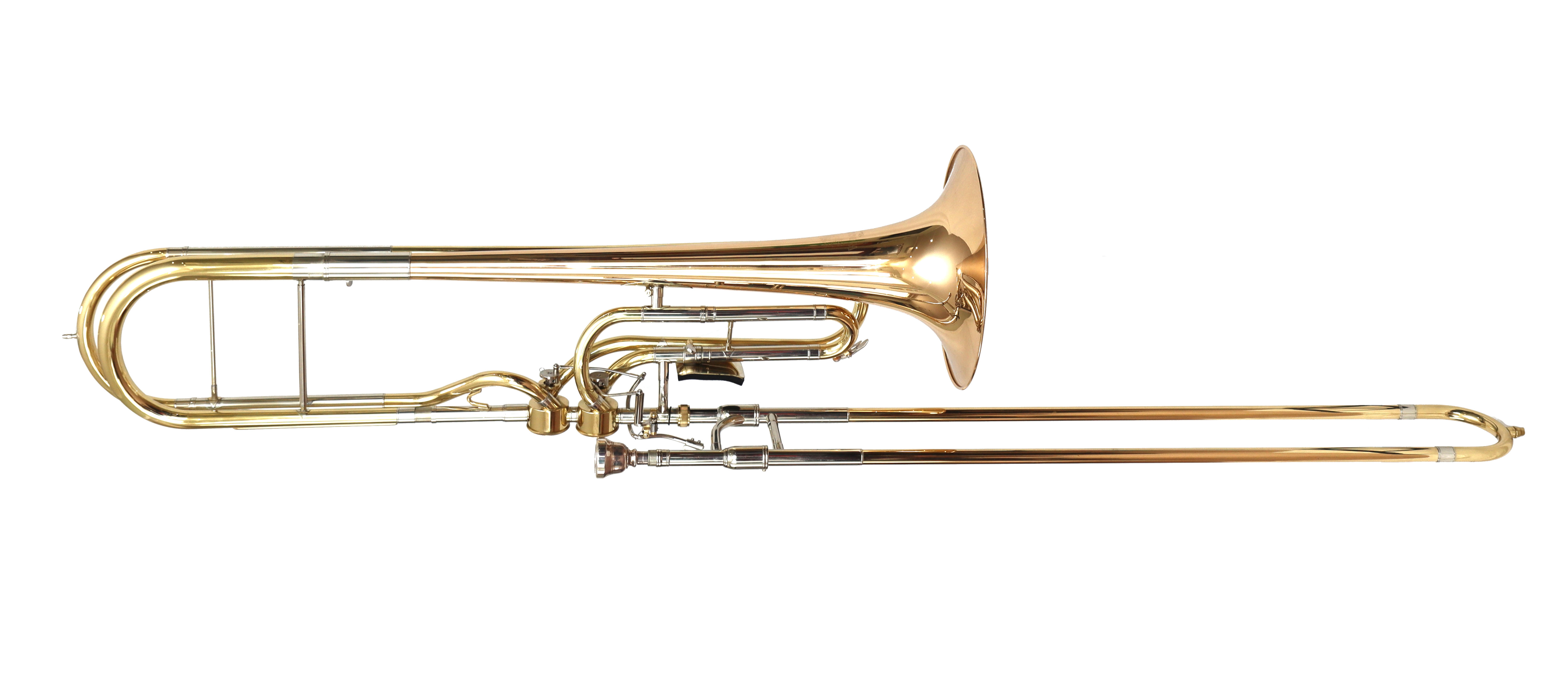
- Contrabass trombone in F

Brass instrument
- Other names: German: Kontrabassposaune; French: Trombone contrabasse; Italian: Trombone contrabbasso
- Classification: Wind; Brass; Aerophone
- Hornbostel–Sachs classification: 423.22 (Sliding aerophone sounded by lip vibration)
- Developed: Late 19th century

Playing range
- Range of the contrabass trombone.

Related instruments
- Trombone; Bass trombone; Cimbasso

Musicians
- Bill Reichenbach; Phil Teele

Builders
- Finke; Haag; Kromat; Lätzsch; Leuchter; Miraphone; Rath; Shires; Thein; Helmut Voigt; Jürgen Voigt; Wessex; Double slide: Miraphone; Thein; Historical: Halary (1830s); Besson (1860s); Boosey & Co. (c. 1860–1910); Conn (c. 1900); Kanstul (1981–2020)

The contrabass trombone is the lowest-pitched instrument in the trombone family of brass instruments. While modern instruments are pitched in 12-foot (12′) F with a single slide, the first practical contrabass trombones appeared in the mid-19th century built in 18′ B♭ an octave below the tenor trombone with a double slide. Richard Wagner first commissioned this instrument for his Der Ring des Nibelungen operas in the 1870s. The contrabass trombone has since appeared occasionally in large orchestral works, but without becoming a permanent member of the modern orchestra.

Since the late 20th century, the double-slide contrabass has largely been supplanted by the less cumbersome bass-contrabass in F, a fourth below the B♭ tenor and bass trombones. In the 21st century the contrabass has enjoyed something of a revival, particularly in film and video game soundtracks.

== History ==
Octav-posaune in 18′ B♭ by Öller, 1639. Scenkonst Museet, Stockholm

The contrabass trombone first appeared in Renaissance music in the late 16th century. Bass trombones of the time were the quart-posaune pitched in E, or the quint-posaune in D, a fourth or fifth below the "common" tenor trombone in A. German music scholar Michael Praetorius, writing c. 1620, also describes two types of octav-posaune (lit. 'octave trombone'), one of which was a large sackbut built in A one octave below the tenor, with a very long slide and an extension handle to reach the lower positions. One such instrument survives, built in 18′ B♭. Praetorius called this double-length instrument very rare. Canadian trombonist and early music specialist Maximilien Brisson proposes the other type was a large-bore quint-posaune with an extra whole-tone crook, resulting in an instrument in C capable of playing down to G_{1}, the lowest open string of the G Violone. These large instruments were seldom used and generally unsatisfactory with players, being unwieldy and taxing to play.

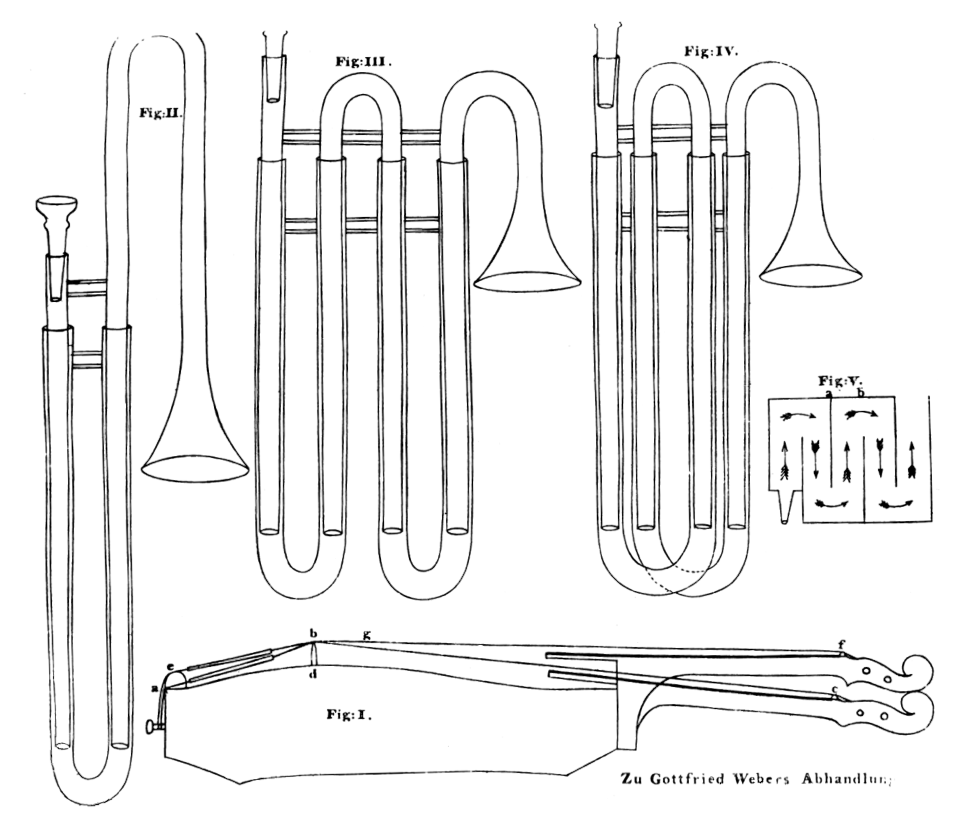
Gottfried Weber's trombone slide concept in Allgemeine musikalische Zeitung, 1816

The innovation that enabled a practical instrument was the double slide, first documented nearly two centuries later in 1816 by German writer and composer Gottfried Weber. He proposed that it would lend greater facility to the bass trombone, and described the idea of using two joined outer slides moving on four inner tubes, halving the distances between slide positions. Makers soon applied the double slide to bass trombones in F and E♭ that would normally require a slide handle to reach the longest positions. Newly invented models of contrabass trombone in low 16′ C and 18′ B♭ soon followed, and the first double-slide contrabass trombones were produced by Parisian maker Jean Hilaire Asté (known as Halary) in the 1830s.

=== First use in orchestral music ===
In France, composer Georges Bizet called for contrabass trombone in his opera La Coutes du Roi de Thulé (1869), and in his completion in the same year of Noé, an unfinished opera by his father-in-law and French composer Fromental Halévy. Soon after, Wagner notably employed contrabass trombone in his Der Ring des Nibelungen, a cycle of four operas commonly known as the Ring cycle, writing a fourth trombone part to double on bass and contrabass trombone. For the première in 1876, Wagner commissioned a contrabass in 18′ B♭ from Berlin instrument maker Carl Wilhelm Moritz, who built it with a double slide. The double slide and the pitch one octave lower means this instrument has the same seven positions as the tenor trombone, and a range to the low E_{1} in the "spear" motif in Das Rheingold:

The "spear" motif intended for contrabass in the fourth trombone part of Das Rheingold, the first opera in Wagner's Ring cycle.

In Britain in the 1860s, London instrument maker Boosey & Co. built a small number of "Basso Profundo" double-slide contrabass trombones in 16′ C. These were intended for use in British orchestras performing Wagner's operas, and one surviving instrument built in 1898 was named "King Kong" by players. At the turn of the 20th century, American instrument manufacturer C. G. Conn produced a small number of B♭ double-slide contrabass trombones.

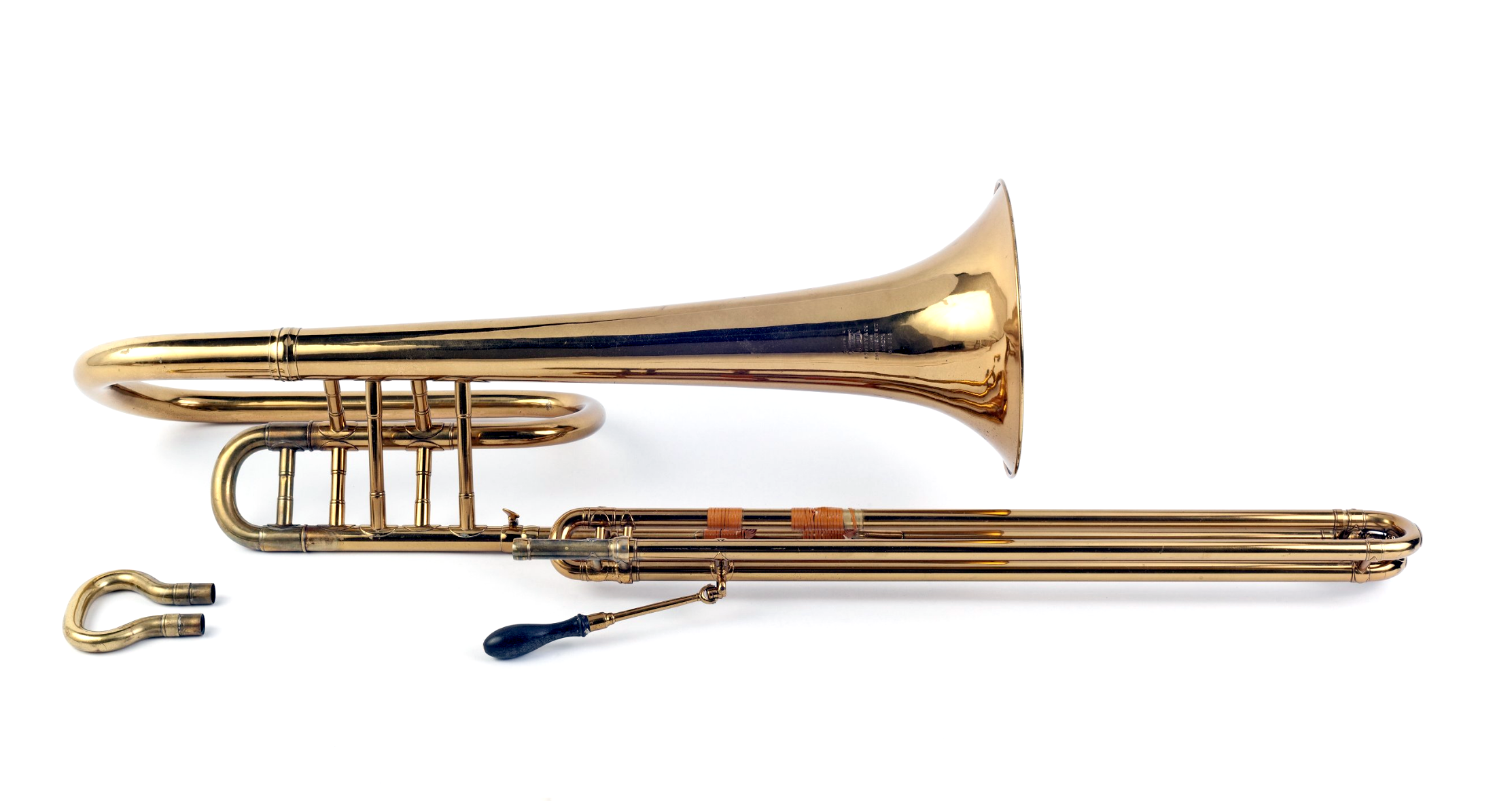
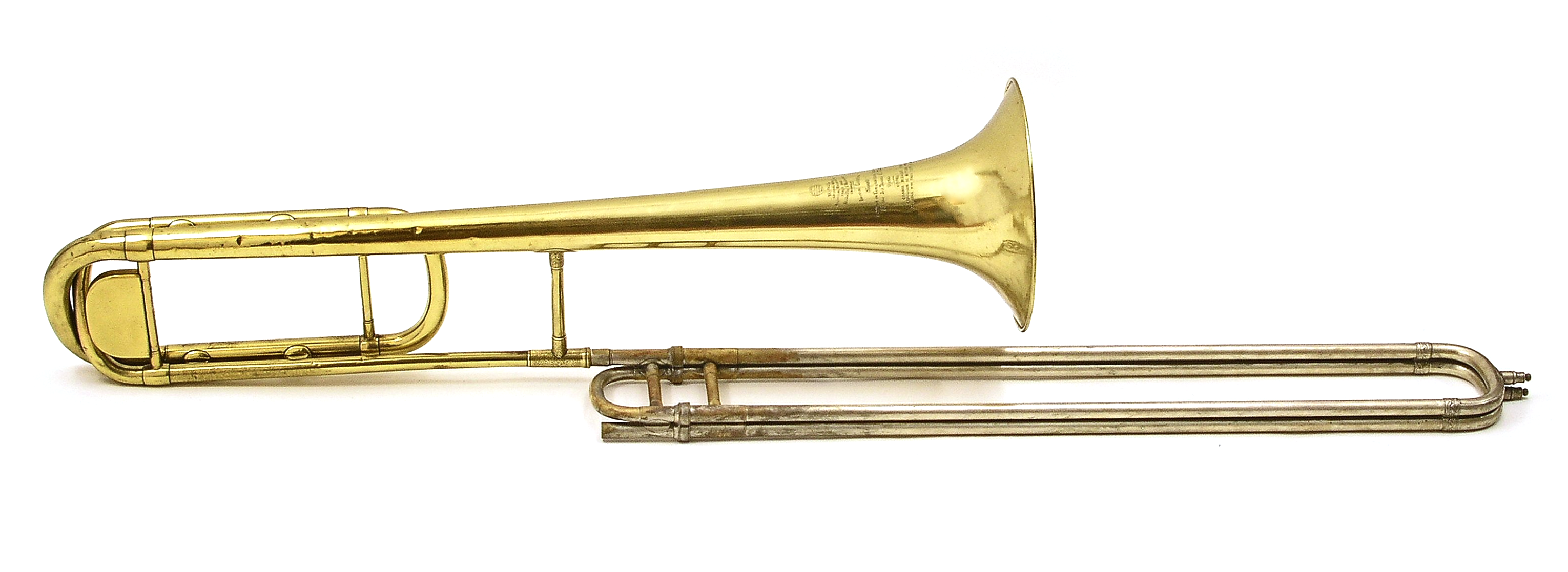
Late 19th century contrabass trombones with double slides, left: in 16′ C (London: Boosey & Co, 1898); right: in 18′ B♭ (Paris: Courtois, c. 1890s). St Cecilia's Hall, University of Edinburgh.

=== 19th-century Italy ===
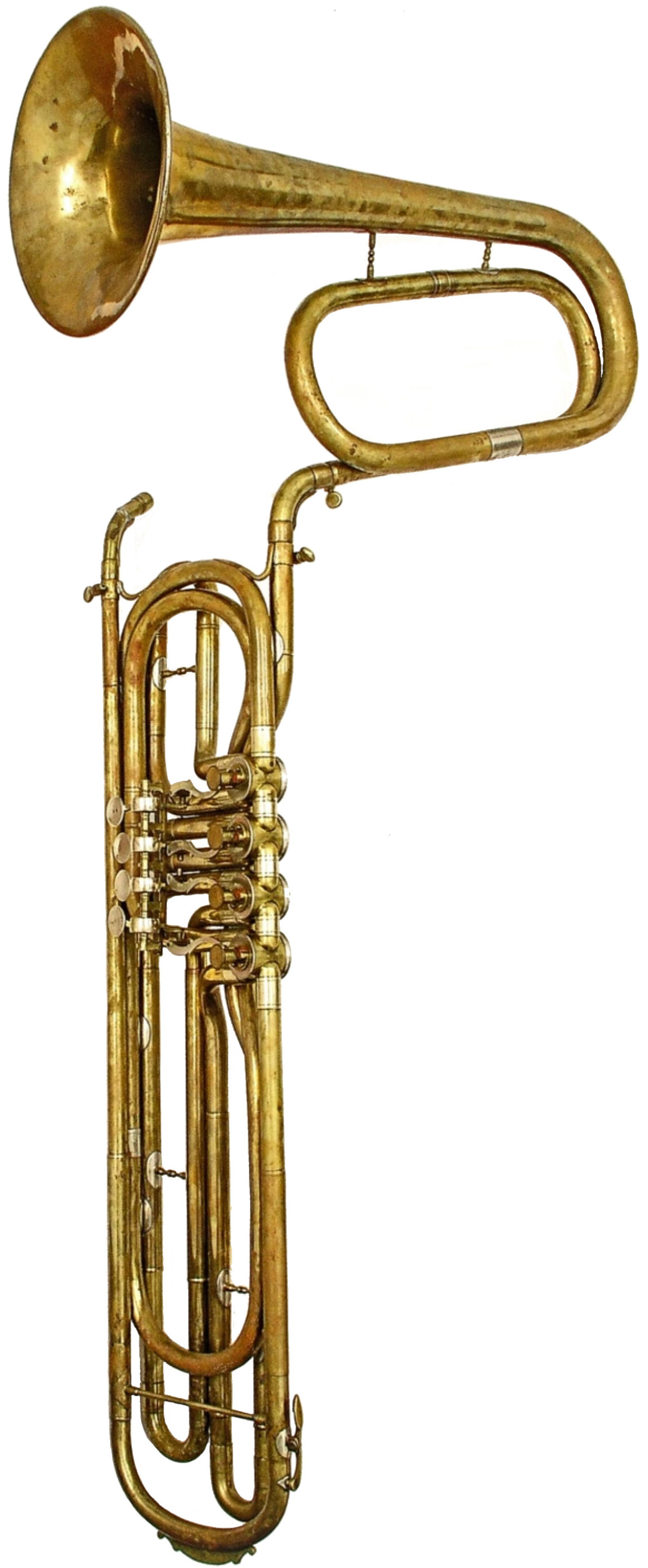
Cimbasso in B♭ by Stowasser, early 20th century. St Cecilia's Hall, University of Edinburgh

Italian composers for much of the 19th century specified the cimbasso as the bass voice of the brass section, a confusing term which over time referred to an upright serpent, ophicleide, or early variants of the tuba. In preparation for the La Scala première of Aida in 1872, Italian opera composer Giuseppe Verdi expressed his displeasure about "that devilish bombardone" (referring to the tuba) as the bass of the trombone section, preferring a "trombone basso". In 1887 for Otello, Milan instrument maker Pelitti produced the trombone basso Verdi (or sometimes, trombone contrabbasso Verdi), a valved contrabass trombone in low B♭. This instrument blended with the usual Italian trombone section of the time—three tenor valve trombones in B♭—and became the prototype for the modern cimbasso. Verdi and Italian opera composer Giacomo Puccini both wrote for this instrument in their later operas, although confusingly they often referred to it as simply trombone basso to distinguish it from the tenor trombones.

=== Later innovations ===
In 1921, Ernst Dehmel, a Berlin trombonist, patented a new design of contrabass trombone that added two independent rotary valves to the old bass trombone in F, still found in Prussian military bands of the time. The valves provide a fully chromatic range by supplying missing low register notes between the pedal F_{1} in first position and the second partial C_{2} in sixth (slide fully extended, without using a handle). The valves also provide alternatives for other notes in long slide positions, thus neither a longer slide with a handle nor a cumbersome double slide are needed. Dehmel's bass-contrabass instrument was the prototype for the modern F contrabass trombone designs that followed. In 1959, German organologist Hans Kunitz took Dehmel's instrument and filed a patent for a design with improved paddles allowing the use of the middle or fourth finger to engage the second valve. These instruments were first built as Cimbasso-Bassposaune in the 1960s by Gebr. Alexander in Germany, and subsequently by other German and Bohemian makers.

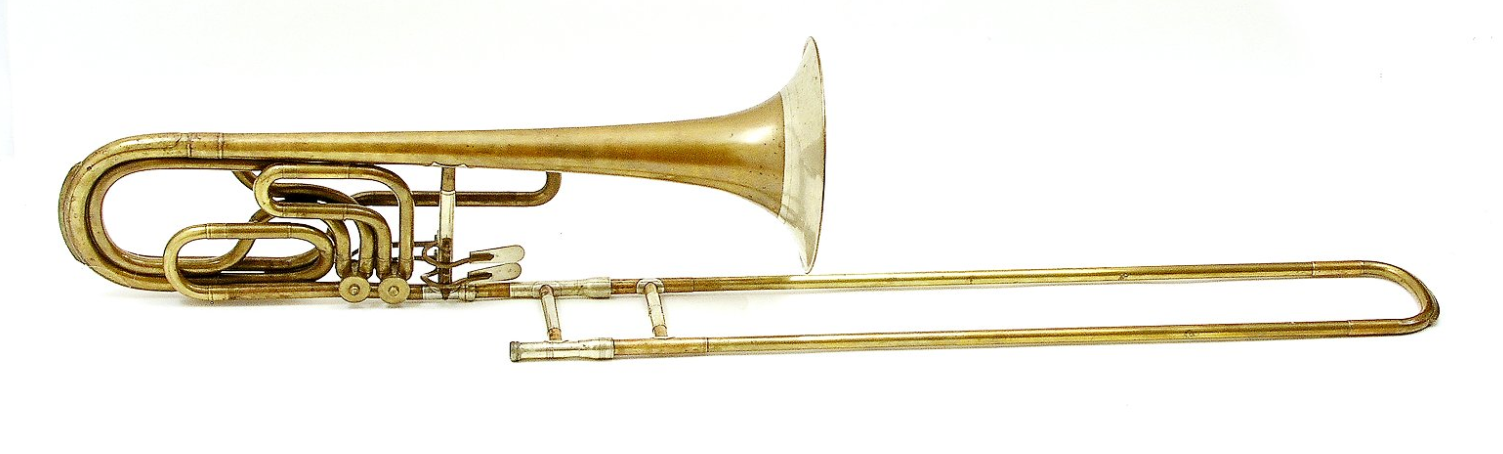
Contrabass trombone in F, built c. 1930 by Sprinz, after the Dehmel design; St Cecilia's Hall, University of Edinburgh

=== Contemporary use ===
Since the 1990s, the contrabass trombone in F with two valve attachments has all but replaced the double slide B♭ instrument. The contrabass trombone is increasingly called for in large orchestral works by modern composers, and routinely since the late 1990s in film and video game soundtracks.

== Construction ==
Instruments in F are built with two independent ("in-line") valves. These valves are usually tuned two ways. A "traditional" configuration common with European manufacturers has a first valve lowering the instrument a minor third into D, and a second that lowers it a fifth into B♭, which when used together lower the instrument a major sixth into A♭. The "American" style commonly favoured by American manufacturers and players has valves in C and D♭, combining to give A. This results in a contrabass with valves using the same intervals (F/C/D♭/A) as a two-valve bass trombone (B♭/F/G♭/D). Some instrument makers provide sets of tuning slides that allow changing between both configurations.

The bell diameter is similar to or slightly larger than a bass trombone, at around 9 1/2 to 11 inches (240 to 280 mm). The bore is typically at least as wide as the 0.562 inches (14.3 mm) version usually used in modern bass trombones, and is commonly around 0.576 to 0.605 inches (14.6 to 15.4 mm) in size. Some models employ a dual-bore slide, and many models are now made using Axial or Hagmann valves. An inexpensive model similar to Thein's "Ben van Dijk" model contrabass is also made in China by Jinbao. It is also resold as a stencil instrument by several suppliers, including Dillon, O'Malley and Schiller.

=== Double slide instruments ===
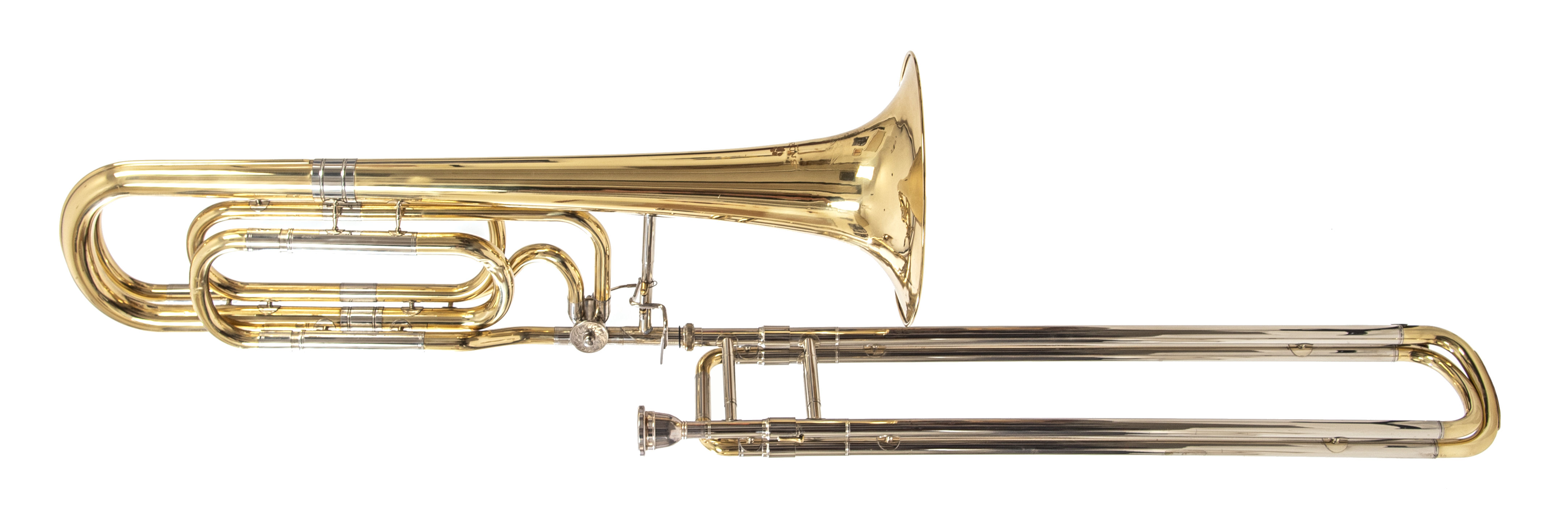
Contrabass trombone in B♭ with double slide

Double slide contrabass trombones are still made by German makers Thein and Miraphone, in 18′ B♭ (Miraphone also offer one built in 16′ C). The bore is large, varying from 0.587 inches (14.9 mm) up to 0.615 inches (15.6 mm) for the largest Miraphone models. An inexpensive model similar to the Miraphone is also made in China by Jinbao. They are all built with at least one valve that lowers the instrument a fourth (i.e. B♭/F or C/G), and the Miraphone C model has a second independent valve tunable to A or A♭. The second valve can also be fitted with a smaller B♭ tuning slide, and has a reversible linkage to place the instrument in B♭, raising it to C when engaged.

The double slide can be conceived of as two regular trombone slides operating as one, i.e. two outer slide bows braced together, moving on four parallel inner slides. Although it eliminates the need for a long slide with a handle, it doubles the weight, the friction of movement, and the length of the air column that must be strictly cylindrical.

Older double slide instruments from the 19th and early 20th centuries were made in small numbers by several manufacturers, including Conn, Boosey & Co., and French makers Courtois and Jérôme Thibouville-Lamy. They had no valves, were built with narrower bores, and some instruments only have six usable slide positions, instead of the seven that would be expected.

== Range ==
Range of the F contrabass trombone.

The range of a modern F contrabass trombone with two valves is fully chromatic from at least C_{1} to F_{4}, with a comfortable working range of approximately E_{1} to D_{4}. Pedal tones are distinct and resonant, and can be obtained to C_{1} with the six reachable open slide positions. In theory the range extends as far as F♯_{0} using both valves, but in practice very low pedal tones become increasingly difficult to produce on cylindrical-bore brass instruments due to their inherent acoustical limitations.

Range of the B♭ contrabass trombone; notes marked "V" require an F valve.

The range of the original B♭ contrabass trombone demanded by Wagner extends to E_{1}. With a valve in F the range extends to C_{1}, although some instruments with a shorter slide cannot always reach the C_{1} at full extent, and B_{0} above the B♭_{0} pedal is unobtainable. These notes are not missing on the modern F contrabass, which can access the lowest useful range of the double slide contrabass.

== Repertoire ==
After Wagner's reinvention of the B♭ contrabass trombone for the Ring cycle, it has occasionally been used by other 20th century composers. In Germany, composer Richard Strauss wrote for it in his opera Elektra (1908), and Arnold Schoenberg scored Gurre-Lieder (1913) for a section of seven trombones including alto and contrabass. French composer Vincent D'Indy, inspired by performances of Wagner's Ring cycle, wrote for it in several of his later works, including his last two symphonies. It has also been called for in works by composers Gustav Holst, Havergal Brian, Alban Berg, Anton Webern, Edgard Varèse, György Ligeti, and Pierre Boulez. Despite this, the contrabass trombone did not earn a permanent seat in the opera or symphony orchestra.

Since the late 1980s the contrabass trombone has appeared in orchestral works by Harrison Birtwistle, Sofia Gubaidulina, Hans Werner Henze, and Manfred Trojahn. It has also enjoyed a revival particularly in film and video game soundtracks, due to the influence of Los Angeles session players Phil Teele, Bill Reichenbach, Bob Sanders and others. The contrabass trombone first appeared in film music in Jerry Goldsmith's score for Planet of the Apes (1968), played by Phil Teele. The popularisation of loud, low-brass heavy orchestral music in films and video games like the remake of Planet of the Apes (2001), Call of Duty (2003) and Inception (2010) has made the contrabass trombone nearly ubiquitous, and bass trombonists are now routinely required to double on contrabass for soundtrack session work.

In jazz, the contrabass trombone can sometimes be employed to play the fourth (bass) trombone parts in big bands. American jazz composer Maria Schneider has written for it in several of her works, featuring on her 2007 Sky Blue and 2017 The Thompson Fields albums.

== Performance ==
The double-slide contrabass trombone in B♭ is taxing to play, even with modern instruments. It is unwieldy, being about twice as heavy as a tenor or bass trombone, and its cylindrical bore is less efficient than a similar-pitched tuba, requiring more air to produce a good sound. The F contrabass is more agile, since for much of its range it has a shorter air column and, like the bass trombone, has two valves which allow access to more alternate positions. Nonetheless, like the tuba, the instrument is better suited as the contrabass voice of harmonic material in an ensemble, rather than virtuoso or solo passages.

The use of a contrabass trombone in an orchestra is usually as an additional fourth player to the standard section of three trombones. In the past, the lack of good instruments, and players able to play them, meant that contrabass trombone parts were often played on a tuba or bass trombone (as can be heard on many 20th century recordings of Wagner, Verdi and Puccini). Since the start of the 21st century, it is considered unacceptable to use anything but a contrabass trombone to play them, at least in professional settings. Most opera house orchestras and some symphony orchestras require the bass trombonist to double on the contrabass trombone.
