= Battle of the Nations (disambiguation) =

Battle of the Nations is an alternative name for the Battle of Leipzig (1813).

Battle of the Nations may also refer to:

- The Battle of Nations (wargame), a 1975 board wargame simulating the 1813 battle
- Leipzig: The Battle of Nations, a 1969 board wargame simulating the 1813 battle
- Battle of the Nations (medieval tournament), a modern international medieval-style tournament and festival held yearly in Europe, in which a number of nations field a team
- "Battle of the Nations" (song), a World War I era song released in 1915
