= E. T. Paull =

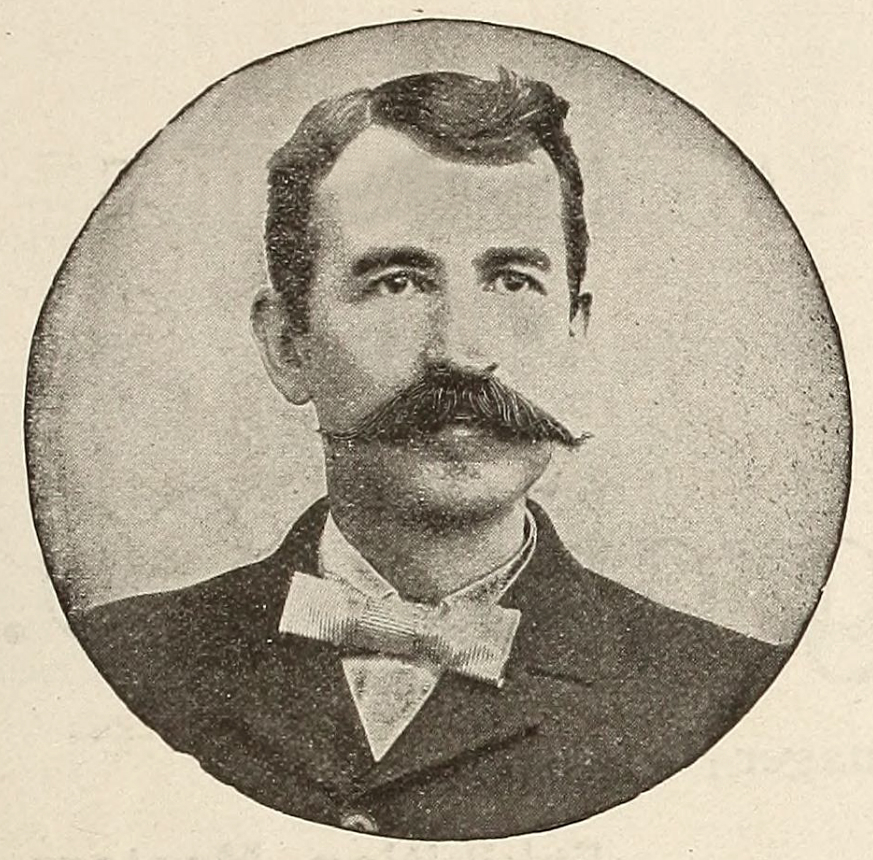
- 1899 portrait of Paull
- Born: February 16, 1858
- Died: November 25, 1924 (aged 66)
- Occupations: composer, arranger, sheet music publisher
- Years active: 1894-1924
- Notable work: The Chariot Race or Ben Hur; Paul Revere's Ride

Edward Taylor Paull (February 16, 1858 – November 25, 1924) was an American composer, arranger, and sheet music publisher.

== Personal life ==
He was born in Gerrardstown, in what is now West Virginia, and died in Brooklyn, New York.

== Musical career ==
He had some success with a few titles which enabled him to set up his own self-publishing company. His music was intended for the piano sheet music trade.

His first publication was for the Richmond Music Company in Richmond, VA where he was general manager. The first publication was The Chariot Race or Ben Hur March with a full-color cover. Paull's success with Ben Hur, prompted him to use it in his marketing as he moved into the music teaching market and the phonograph manufacturing business.

He began publishing in 1894, specializing in marches. He is known for his 1905 march entitled, Paul Revere's Ride which was dedicated to the Daughters of the American Revolution.

In order to sell music, the music was marketed with uniquely colorful front cover illustrations to catch the eye of buyers. He was the first music publisher to use five-color lithography for his sheet music. For this reason alone, music published by his firm has become highly collectible in the modern era and has latterly aroused interest in the composer.

To further boost sales, he marketed his music as "descriptives" and ascribed certain sections of the music to allude to certain depictions of events on the cover illustration. This type of publication alludes to its being comparable to program music whilst never achieving the requisite complexity. The marketing of the pieces as "descriptives" (often a latter enhanced recycling of earlier published material) enabled the same music to be sold a second time around to the wide market of beginner-level pianists who had been accustomed to fare of this kind since Pridham's "Battle March of Delhi" in the mid-19th century. On this musical level, his true contemporaries were the British writers Ezra Read and Theo Bonheur of the same period.

After Paull's death, his publishing company merged into Pioneer Music in 1925 to form Paull-Pioneer Music. Shawnee Press acquired Paull-Pioneer Music in 1952.

== Compositions ==
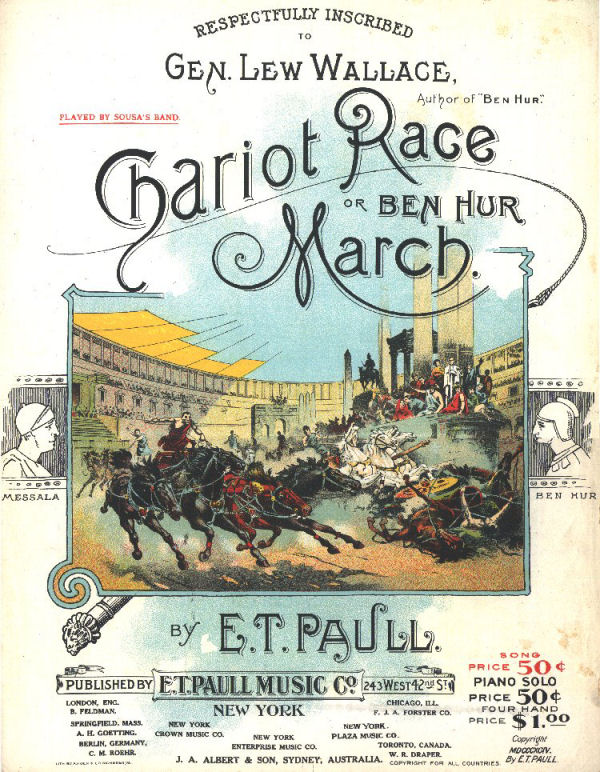
Cover of E.T. Paull's Chariot Race March (1896)

=== 1894 ===
- The Chariot Race or Ben Hur March OCLC 932533358

=== 1895 ===
- The Old Man's Story
- The Stranger's Story Song, or Why Do Our Loved Ones Leave Us

=== 1896 ===
- Charge of the Light Brigade OCLC 26774048
- The Della Fox Little Trooper March
- The Elk's Grand March
- Get Off Cuba's Toes
- Great New York
- Loan Me A Nickel
- The New York and Coney Island Cycle March
- The Stranger's Story Waltz
- Sweet Rosa Dugan From Hogan's Alley
- What Might Have Been
- Whisper Again Sweet I Love You
- You'll Always Find A Welcome For You At Home Sweet Home

=== 1898 ===
- America Forever! March
- He's Goin' to Hab a Hot Time Bye & Bye [w/Harry S. Miller]
- The Ice Palace March
- If You Were Only By My Side
- Uncle Jasper's Jubilee
- We'll Stand by the Flag

=== 1899 ===
- A Warmin' Up In Dixie

=== 1900 ===
- Dawn of the Century OCLC 82993588

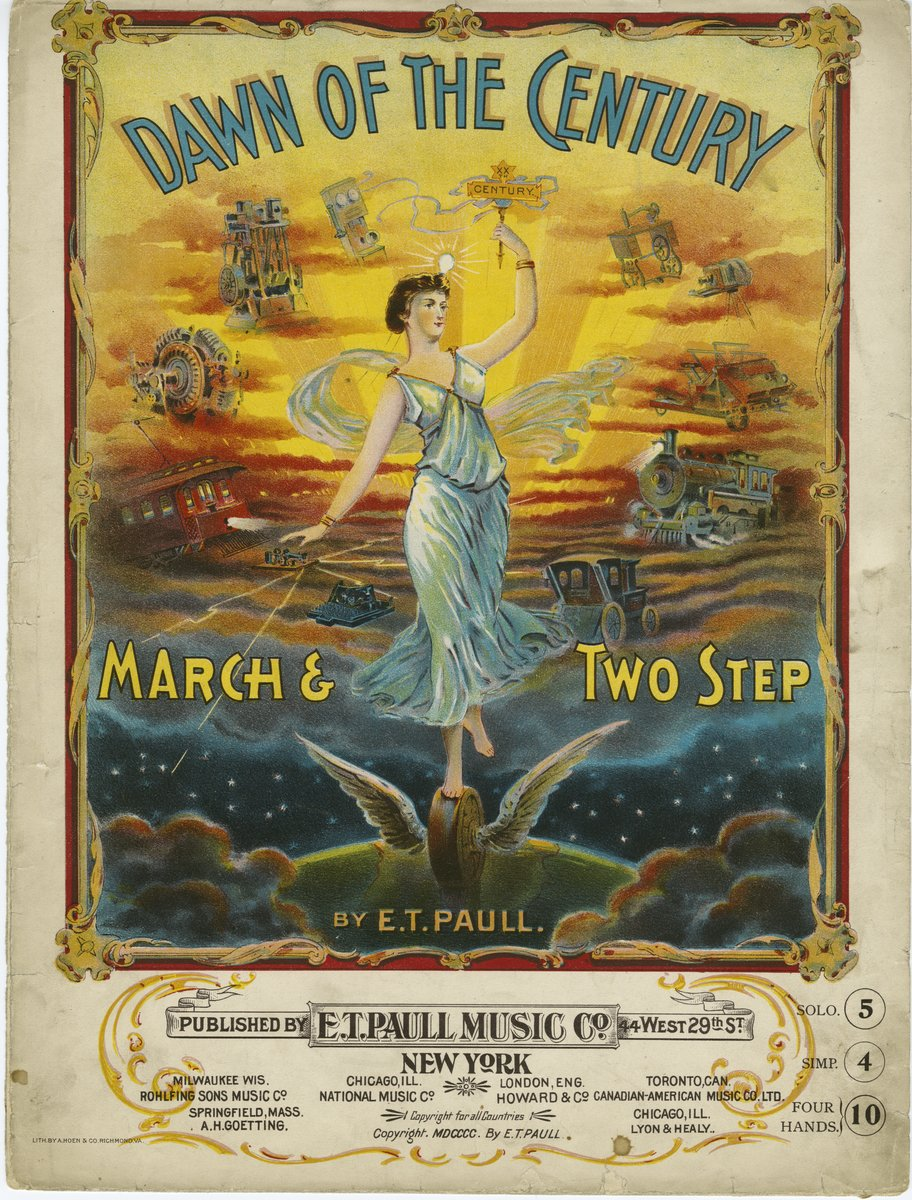
Cover of E.T. Paull's Dawn of the Century (1900)

- A Signal From Mars

=== 1901 ===
- Our Wedding Bells Will Ring Out Some Day [w/Arthur Treveylan]
- When Johnny Goes A Camping [w/Vincent P. Bryan]
- The Witch's Whirl OCLC 997473426

=== 1902 ===
- The Storm King

=== 1903 ===
- The Burning of Rome OCLC 815381051

=== 1904 ===
- The Circus Parade
- The Romany Rye

=== 1905 ===
- The Jolly Blacksmiths
- Paul Revere's Ride OCLC 26774241 and OCLC 78344256

=== 1906 ===
- Silver Sleigh Bells

=== 1907 ===
- The Triumphant Banner
- The Masquerade

=== 1908 ===
- The Home Coming March

=== 1909 ===
- Lincoln Centennial Grand March OCLC 84327666
- The Dashing Cavaliers

=== 1912 ===
- The Roaring Volcano
- Ring Out, Wild Bells

=== 1913 ===
- Kaiser Jubilee March

=== 1914 ===
- Paull's Hesitiation Waltz
- Herald of Peace March

=== 1915 ===
- Battle of the Nations OCLC 53114742
- Tipperary Guards

=== 1916 ===
- Woman Forever OCLC 83573142

=== 1917 ===
- Battle of Gettysburg

=== 1918 ===
- Pershing's Crusaders
- Hurrah! For the Liberty Boys, Hurrah! OCLC 43664611
- Words and music by Harry Kennedy. Re-arranged and revised by Paull. Say "au revoir" but not good bye. OCLC 20119169

=== 1919 ===
- American Wedding March
- Spirit of France

=== 1922 ===
- Sheridan's Ride
- Custer's Last Charge

=== 1924 ===
- The Four Horsemen of the Apocalypse
- Spirit of the U. S. A.

=== 1926 ===
- Top of the World (published posthumously)
