= Cyfarthfa Band =

Welsh brass band

- Brass band
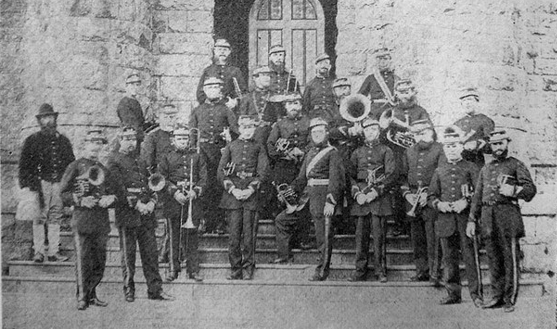
- An early photo of the band on the steps of Cyfarthfa Castle, c. 1850
- Founded: c. 1840
- Later name: Cyfarthfa and Merthyr Municipal Band
- Location: Cyfarthfa, Merthyr Tydfil, Wales
- Principal conductor: Ralph Livsey
- Music director: Robert Thompson Crawshay

The Cyfarthfa Band was a private brass band created in the mid-19th century by Robert Thompson Crawshay, the future owner of the Cyfarthfa Ironworks in Merthyr Tydfil, Wales.

The band was established around 1840 by Robert Thompson Crawshay, the son of Cyfarthfa Ironworks owner William Crawshay II. It was funded and organised by Crawshay, who sourced instruments from Vienna and recruited players from around the United Kingdom. Ralph Livsey joined as bandmaster in 1848, and was succeeded by his son George when he died in 1863.

During this time, the band played various shows at the Crawshay's Cyfarthfa Castle estate and around Merthyr, from weddings to flower shows. They entered Enderby Jackson's 1860 contest at The Crystal Palace and won the second day's event. The band continued until the early 20th century, when it was taken over by the council as the Cyfarthfa and Merthyr Municipal Band.

== History ==
=== Founding ===
While most brass bands were formed as representations of local workers or councils, the Cyfarthfa band was originally formed as a private band for Robert Thompson Crawshay, the son of Cyfarthfa Ironworks owner William Crawshay II. It is generally believed to have been established in 1844, but a March 1840 invoice from instrument maker Charles Pace shows the purchase of three bugles, suggesting that the band was already being assembled. Trevor Herbert later dated the band's establishment to 1838, as mentioned in an obituary of R. T. Crawshay: as such, it is considered one of the first brass bands. The instruments obtained by Pace were expensive and imported from Vienna making them of a much higher quality than the British instruments made for the local market. Most players were believed to have loaned their instruments from Crawshay, paying him a rate of 5 shillings per month.

As its founder, Crawshay appears to have had full control over the band. Letters dating from the 1860s show that he was administering it through his personal secretary William Jones: he gave his own money to repair band instruments and sent his correspondence through Jones. Instead of sourcing players from his ironworks, Crawshay sought out those who had already achieved some amount of fame. The composer G. C. Bawden played trombone within the band, as well as being a cellist and the future conductor of the Cyfarthfa String Band. William England, an orchestral cornet player from Yorkshire, played soprano.

=== Under Ralph Livsey ===
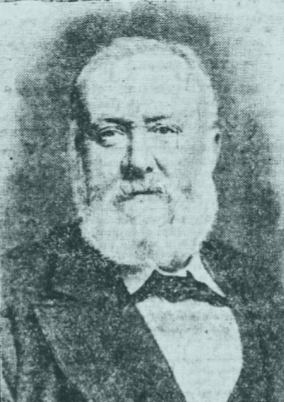
George Livsey, bandmaster from 1863

In 1848, Ralph Livsey joined the band as its bandmaster: he had previously been the solo keyed bugle player for the band that accompanied Wombwell's Travelling Circus and Menagerie. His thirteen-year-old son George Livsey joined the band at the same time as a keyed bugle player, later playing the cornet. During this period, the band immersed itself in the music of the European mainland, playing pieces by Louis-Antoine Jullien, Gioachino Rossini, and Giacomo Meyerbeer among others.

A photograph taken in the 1850s shows a band of twenty-one players: three keyed bugles, four cornets, two tenor horns, four trombones, one euphonium, one ophicleide, two valved basses, two unidentified brass instruments, a side drum, and a bass drum. During this time, the sole ophicleidist was Mr. Coleman, who later emigrated to America. In 1858, the Staffordshire ophicleidist Samuel Hughes joined the band, described by Crawshay in a letter as being "famous" and a "great addition" to the band. It is assumed that Hughes was paid by Crawshay to play, due to the focus on getting him to join the band. Hughes was succeeded by John Walker, a Yorkshireman who had played in travelling shows, but by 1860 he was playing euphonium.

In 1860, the band took part in Enderby Jackson's contest at The Crystal Palace, believed to be its first competitive pursuit. The band played in both the National and Sydenham contest, coming third in the former. After playing the required set of quadrilles composed by Jackson, and an arrangement of the overture to Verdi's opera Nabucco, the band won the latter contest. Crawshay was elevated as a cultural figure, however he had little knowledge of music and was effectively deaf from 1859.

=== Under George Livsey ===
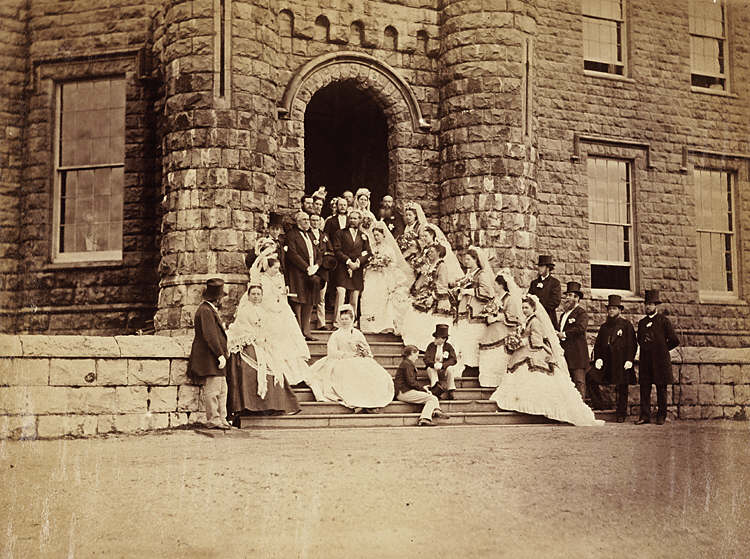
The wedding of Henrietta Louise Crawshay in 1871, where the band played music.

In June 1863, Ralph Livsey died and was immediately succeeded as bandmaster by his son George Livsey. He began working with German-educated French musician George D'Artney to prepare scores for the band, and housed him within Cyfarthfa Castle. Despite D'Artney's apparent drinking problem, they successfully compiled a repertoire of handwritten, eclectic music, featuring transcriptions of symphonies by the greatest European composers. This maintained its connection to the European-style of band which his father and Crawshay had created. D'Artney later moved to San Francisco, and a leaving concert was dedicated to him in December 1874.

Alongside the rare contest, the band played at various family and public events. In 1871, the band played at the wedding of Henrietta Louise Crawshay to Captain W. C. Ralston at Cyfarthfa Castle. The band often played in the wagon shed of the Cyfarthfa Ironworks, which had been converted into a ballroom when the Crawshays sought to entertain. They also occasionally performed at flower and agricultural shows, including the 1872 Merthyr Flower Show, where they played a series of marches and classical pieces, and multiple shows of the Glamorganshire Horticultural Society. In 1888, the Cyfarthfa band replaced the Band of the Grenadier Guards at the Trades Exhibition in Cardiff; regulations had been put into place that prohibited bands from playing outside of their local region.

The band appeared to maintain its roster of roughly twenty players in its later years: a photo from the late 1890s shows twenty-four players: five cornets with piston valves, three trombones, and thirteen instruments with four rotary valves each. A photo taken of the band in 1905 shows a band of twenty players: four cornets with piston valves, three trombones, eleven rotary-valved instruments and two flugelhorns. This is believed to be the last known picture of George Livsey leading the band.

In 1902, with the Cyfarthfa Ironworks being taken over by Guest, Keen and Nettlefolds, the band was no longer supported by its industrial namesake. It was, however, permitted to keep the music, instruments and uniform, and make use of the band-room.

The band ceased to exist just before World War I, and the instruments were taken over by the council as the Cyfarthfa and Merthyr Municipal Band. Under that name, it was conducted by J. J. Harvey. He had previously served as bandmaster for the 7th Queen's Own Hussars.

== Legacy ==
The museum at Cyfarthfa Castle holds several instruments known to have belonged to the band, engraved with either "W. T. Crawshay, Esq." or "Cyfarthfa Band". Other instruments at the museum believed to have been used by the band, have not yet been identified in photographs.
