= Slide (wind instrument) =

Mechanism on wind instruments for selecting or adjusting pitch

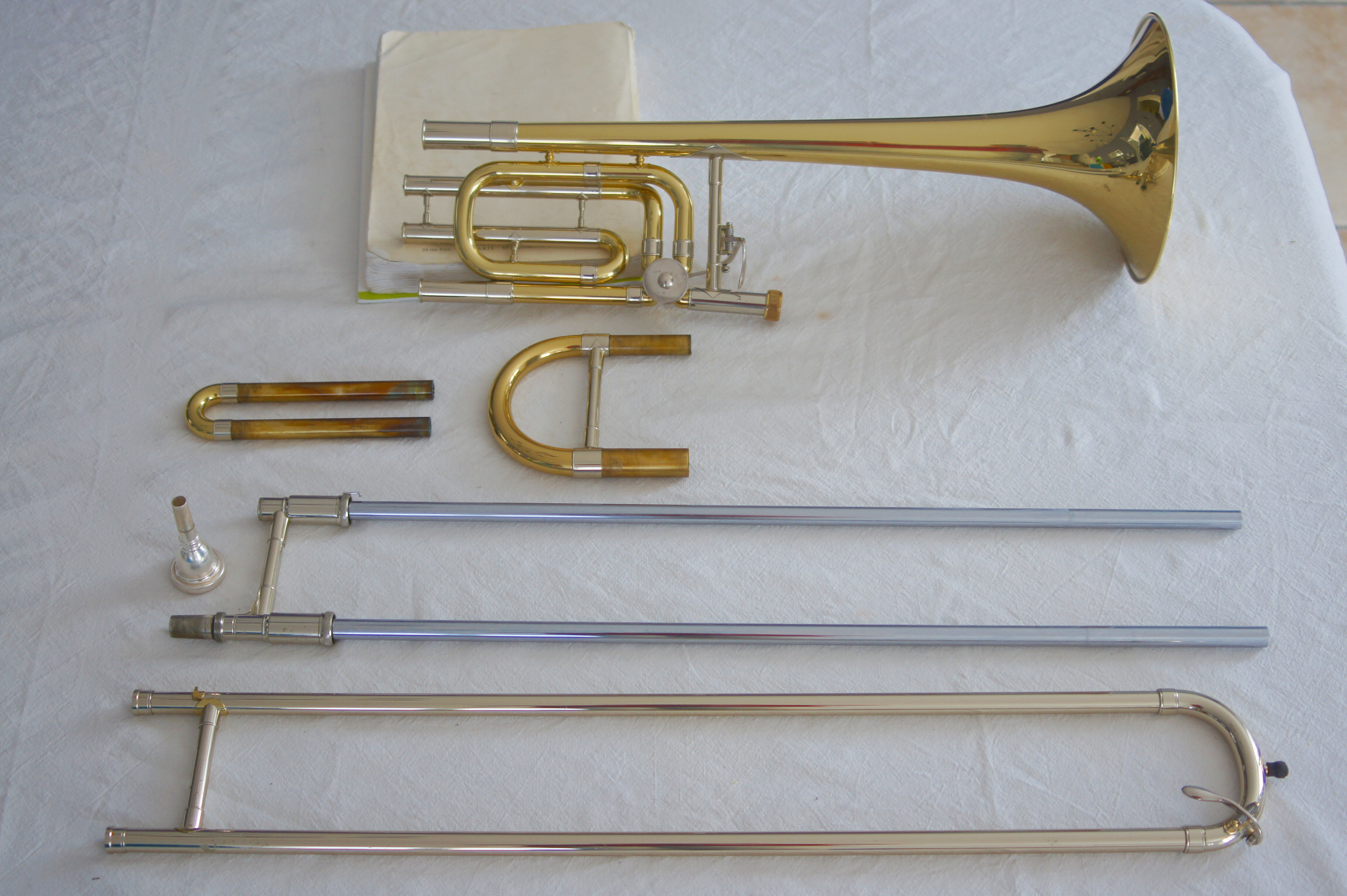
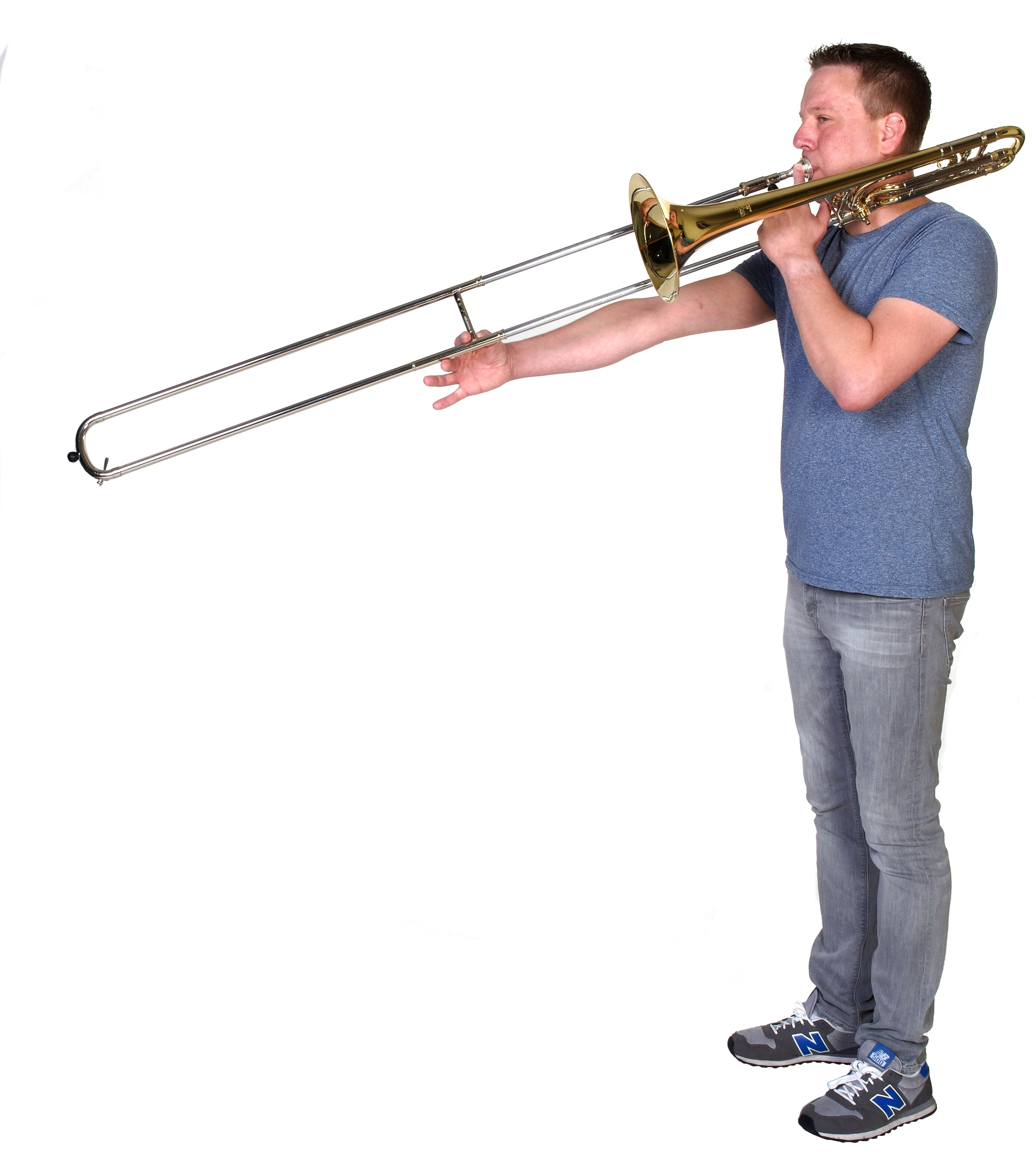
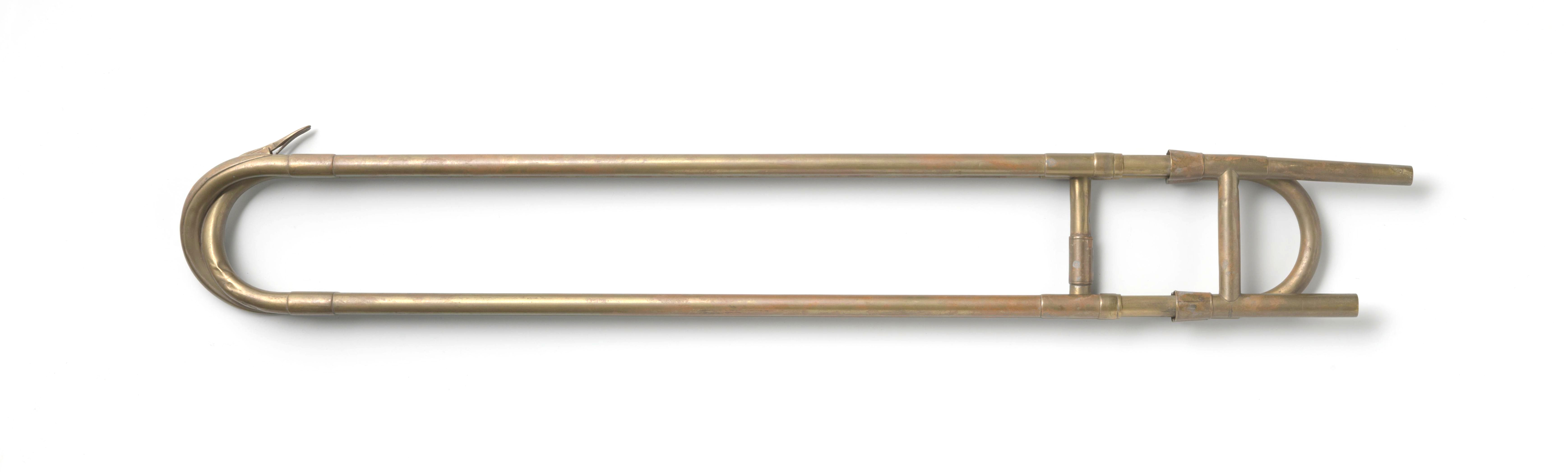
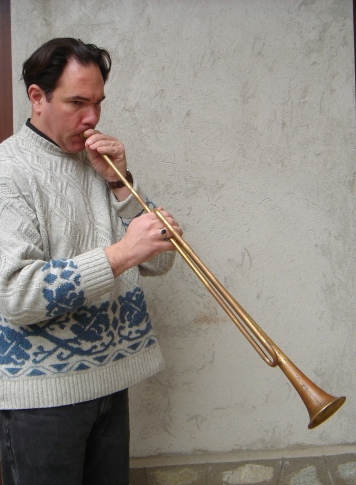
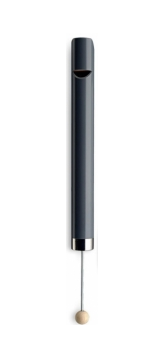
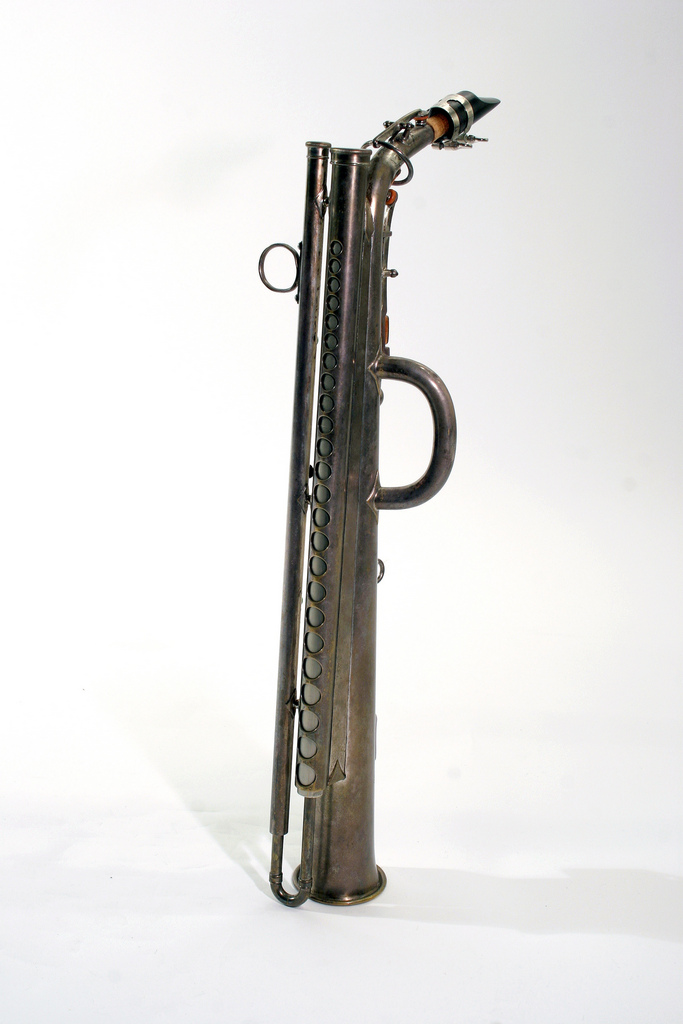
Slides on musical instruments. Trombone disassembled, showing main slide and smaller tuning slides, top left; trombonist operating the slide, top right; contrabass trombone double slide (Rijksmuseum, Amsterdam), middle; Renaissance slide trumpet (reconstruction), bottom left; slide whistle, bottom center; slide saxophone by Reiffel & Husted (c. 1922, Museum of Making Music, California), bottom right.

A slide is a part of a wind instrument consisting of two (or more) pieces of tubing fitted one closely inside the other, and used to vary the overall length of the tube, and therefore the pitch of the instrument. Often two sets of tubes are used, with a U bend attaching them; this arrangement is called a single slide. A double slide, where two U-shaped slides are braced together and move on four inner tubes, is found on the B♭ contrabass trombone.

Slides are used in three main ways:

- In instruments such as the trombone and slide whistle, moving the slide is the way to select the note while playing. Attempts to adapt other wind instruments to use slides instead of tone holes, keys or valves have been tried; for example a slide saxophone was invented in the 1920s by Chicago instrument maker Reiffel & Husted.
- On most brass instruments, a tuning slide is used to adjust the main pitch of the instrument before playing. A modern double or triple french horn has several tuning slides, which are sometimes moved during performance.
- On instruments such as the trumpet and tuba, small valve slides are moved manually or by means of a trigger while playing, to adjust the pitch of the note selected by the valves.
