= Enderby Jackson =

Jackson, (John) Enderby (1827–1903), musician and impresario

- Born: John Enderby Jackson; 14 January 1827; Mytongate, Kingston upon Hull, England
- Died: 10 April 1903 (aged 76); Scarborough, North Yorkshire, England
- Occupations: Impresario, composer
- Years active: 1850–1900
- Known for: Founder of British brass band contests

John Enderby Jackson (14 January 1827 – 10 April 1903) was an English musician, composer, and the self-described founder of the British brass band competition and the cheap day railway excursion.

After training in the family business of candle-making and soap boiling, Jackson became involved in music and learned a variety of instruments. He proceeded to join a dance band, where he witnessed an early brass band competition. In 1851 he arranged a contest in Kingston upon Hull, but his first success came in 1853 at Manchester's Belle Vue Zoological Gardens, where he helped organise a successful contest of brass bands. He began writing test pieces and in 1860 was approached to run a competition at The Crystal Palace in London. This event proved highly successful, and ran annually until 1863.

Following the Crystal Palace contests, he toured the world with a variety of groups and acts, acting both as a manager and musical director. He then retired to Scarborough to paint and write articles on music, and eventually died on Good Friday, 1903. In his articles, he stated that his mission throughout his life was "the propagation of music amongst the working classes".

== Early life and education ==
Jackson was born in the Mytongate area of Kingston upon Hull. His father, John Jackson, was from a line of tallow chandlers and soap boilers. His mother died during his childhood. He attended Hull Grammar School and received private music tuition alongside it, becoming proficient on the flute, French horn, and piano. He showed strength as a singer, and had a general knowledge of harmony and composition.

As a child, Jackson assisted his father's candle business. He later claimed to have watched Louis Jullien's extravagant and talented orchestra perform while placing candles in Hull's Theatre Royal, which inspired him to leave the family business and focus on music instead.

He made his first public performance on the trumpet at the age of nine in the band of brothers Thomas and John Martin. At eighteen, he was playing the flute in the Quadrille Band at Burton Constable Hall. While playing at a pageant in the hall, he witnessed "an afternoon's rivalry of brass bands", being a minor competition between groups.

== Brass band contests ==
While there is minor evidence of small brass band contests prior to Jackson, it is believed that the modern form is traced to his actions. Alongside the performance at Burton Constable, his idea of brass band contests came from watching the large crowds at competitive agricultural events, and considering the idea that competition could be mixed with entertainment to gain even more of an audience.

In the summer of 1851, Jackson held his first contest in Hull. While the number of brass bands in the country had increased throughout the 1840s, most of the bands at this first contest did not exist until December 1850: he spent a lot of time encouraging locals to form bands and compete. As the players had little-to-no musical knowledge or experience, the performances at this first contest were often inadequate.

Jackson's first "Open Brass Band Contest" was held at Manchester's Belle Vue Zoological Gardens in 1853, organised in part with bandsmen James Melling and Tallis Trimmel. Held in the open-air, reports state that 14–16,000 people were in attendance.

He composed Yorkshire Waltzes as a test piece for the Grand Brass Band Contest at Hull's Zoological Gardens on 30 June 1856. He later wrote Venetian Waltz for a contest in Sheffield in June 1858, referred to by the Sheffield Independent as "really a difficult piece of music".

In August 1859, a brass band contest was held by Jackson in Leicester. The event was held alongside fireworks and archery displays, and trains were run from across the Midlands for attendants. Another contest was held in Wolverhampton on Whit Monday in 1862, held alongside an intellect contest among other attractions.

=== Crystal Palace contests ===
In 1858, Jackson held a successful handbell-ringing competition at The Crystal Palace in London; he had been approached by its manager Robert Kanzow Bowley to bring together twelve teams from Lancashire and Yorkshire. Following this, he was engaged in 1859 to hold a brass band contest there the following summer. The 1860 Crystal Palace event was split into two contests on consecutive days: each had six preliminary rounds held around the grounds, with the finals taking place in the concert pavilion. Winning bands were given trophies, a cash prize of between £5 and £40, sets of music journals, and instruments worth up to £35; the best soloists were also given new instruments. Each day finished with a mass concert, performed by almost 1,400 of the contestants: the performance contained Handel's Hallelujah Chorus, Mendelssohn's Wedding March, and Haydn's The Heavens Are Telling, Rule, Britannia!, and God Save the Queen. These performances were conducted by Jackson.

In order to judge the competition, an eighteen-person adjudicating panel was organised with Jackson as the referee. The panel was largely formed of military musical directors, including: Dan and Charles Godfrey (Grenadier Guards), Charles Boosé (Royal Horse Guards), Jacob Kappey (Royal Marines), Smyth (Royal Artillery), and Hartman (10th Hussars).

Jackson's strong sense of organisation and logistics is evident within this event. He had compiled information on each band from their entry forms, including their identity, recent history, musical configuration and style, and the means by which they would travel to Sydenham. On the day before the contest, representatives from each band assembled in the Exeter Hall to be briefed on proceedings and pick lots for the order of play.

The first day's event was called the National Contest and was open to any band (it was marketed as being for "Amateur, Yeomanry, or Rifle Corps bands"). Forty-four bands entered the contest, and the winners were the Black Dyke Mills Band from Queensbury, West Yorkshire.

The second event was called the Sydenham Amateur Contest and was open to bands that had not won a competition prize of more than £20 during the previous year: seventy bands entered. On this day, bands were to play two pieces: one of their own choosing, and a set of quadrilles composed and arranged by Jackson himself. The winners were Robert Thompson Crawshay's Cyfarthfa Band from Merthyr Tydfil in Wales, who played an arrangement of the overture to Verdi's opera Nabucco. The band entered both days' contests, as many others seem to have done.

Admission prices for spectators was a half crown on the first day, with The Morning Chronicle estimating that 7,000 people attended. The second day was cheaper at a shilling, with The Times estimating that a considerably higher 22,000 were in attendance.

The contests were held annually until 1863 with the final two contests containing only one event. The 1861 event saw a solo competition for bass players, which was won by a performer from the Keighley band: he was given a sonorophone E-flat contrabass as a prize. While most other winners had come from the North, 1863 winner came from Blandford in Dorset; the set test piece for that year was a selection from Verdi's opera La forza del destino arranged by J. Smyth. The growing success of other contests saw the decline of Jackson's Crystal Palace contests, with only 21 bands competing in the final year, perhaps explaining why no more Jackson contests were held there. The next brass band contest held there was in 1900, arranged by John Henry Iles and renamed "The National Brass Band Championship".

Jackson had arranged for another contest to take place in London in 1864 between musicians from France and England, but the plans did not come to fruition.

=== Competition results ===
The top three results for each of the contests are as follows:

10 and 11 July 1860
Placement	National	Sydenham
1st	Black Dyke Mills Band (Conductor: S. Longbottom)	Cyfarthfa Band (Conductor: Ralph Livsey)
2nd	Saltaire Band (Conductor: Richard Smith)	Dewsbury Old Band
3rd	Cyfarthfa Band (Conductor: Ralph Livsey)	Goldshill Saxhorn (Conductor: J. Blandford)

23 and 25 July 1861
Placement	National	Sydenham
1st	Saltaire Band	Keighley Marriner's
2nd	Chesterfield	Victoria
3rd	Marriner's, Keighley	Darlington

9 September 1862
Placement	National
1st	Chesterfield Rifle Corps
2nd	Black Dyke Mills Band
3rd	Marriner's, Keighley

28 July 1863
Placement	National
1st	Blandford
2nd	Dewsbury Old
3rd	Matlock Bath

=== Business style ===
Jackson believed in the need to entertain, and his contests were often accompanied by sideshows and hot air balloon ascents. He negotiated with railway companies to secure special arrangements for bands attending his contests; he paid the rail companies directly with the bands' entry fees. He also managed to secure cheaper fares for the supporters of bands, taking advantage of the railway industry's potential in the entertainment business.

== Other ventures ==
Following the Crystal Palace contests, Jackson began touring with his own group: "Enderby Jackson's London Star Company Comique". In September 1871, he began a three-year tour of Australia, New Zealand, and South Africa. He had the opportunity to remain in the country as manager of Melbourne's Opera House, but was unable to due to ill health. After his tour, he took over an 1875 tour by the Billingtons, a husband and wife performing in plays together. Two years later, he brought an Italian concert band to the United Kingdom and toured its principal towns.

In 1878, he managed a European tour for Patrick Gilmore's American band. This tour took him to Belgium, France, and many British towns. Following the tour, he effectively retired from managing bands and settled down in Scarborough to paint and write. During the 1890s, Jackson published a series of articles in the magazine Musical Opinion, and in 1891 he proposed plans to join Scarborough's North and South Bay.

== Personal life ==
On 18 January 1860, he married Eliza S. Smith (1837–1909) of Nettleham in Lincolnshire. They had four children, including at least one son, H. E. Jackson.

On 9 April 1903, he suffered a brain haemorrhage at his home in Scarborough. He died either that day, or the next (Good Friday). He was buried in the town's Manor Road cemetery.
