= Jean Hilaire Asté =

French music professor and instrument maker

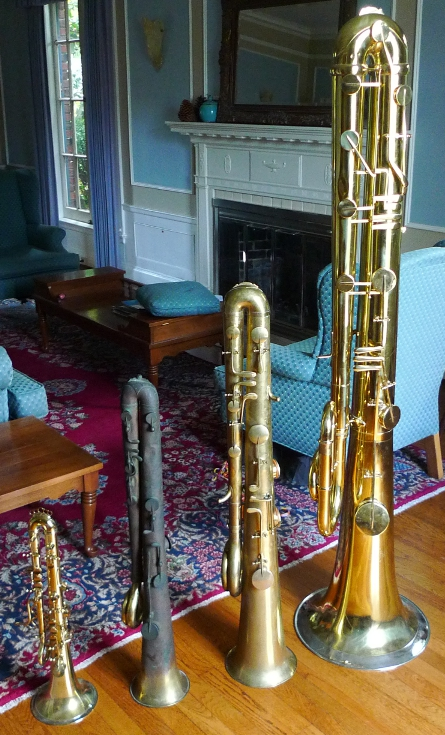
Full range of ophicleides (the second from the left is an alto in E flat by Halari)

Jean Hilaire Asté (1775–1840), also known as Halary or Halari, was a French professor of music and instrument-maker. Among the other instruments he patented, he is best known for inventing the ophicleide of which, it has been claimed, only five originals remain.

Born in Agen, he moved to Paris in 1796, where, in 1804, he founded the maison Halary or Halari workshop, which made brass and woodwind instruments for most of the 19th century.

Although it was invented in 1817, his patent wasn't awarded until 1821. The report of the Académie des Beaux-Arts in 1817 stated:

As to the two instruments which M. Halary designs under the names of 'quinti-clave' and 'ophicleide', they bear a great resemblance to those submitted to the Academy in the sitting of the 11th of March 1811 by M. Dumas, which he designed under the names of 'basse et contrebasse guerrières.' ... The opinion of our commission on the quinti-clave and ophicleide is that M. Halary can only claim the merit of an improvement and not that of an entire invention.

The commission went on to add that it considered Halary had rendered a real service to the art of music and the academy therefore considered he deserves its mark of approval for his trompette à clef. The commission comprised, among other members of the Académie, Luigi Cherubini, François-Joseph Gossec, Charles Simon Catel, Jean-François Le Sueur and Henri Montan Berton.

The Athénée de arts later awarded Halary a medal for his first three instruments.

The Halari workshop was acquired by Comte et Cie. in 1873 or 1875, a company directed by François Sudre, who would go on to invent the sudrophone.
