= Ophicleide =

19th-century keyed brass instrument

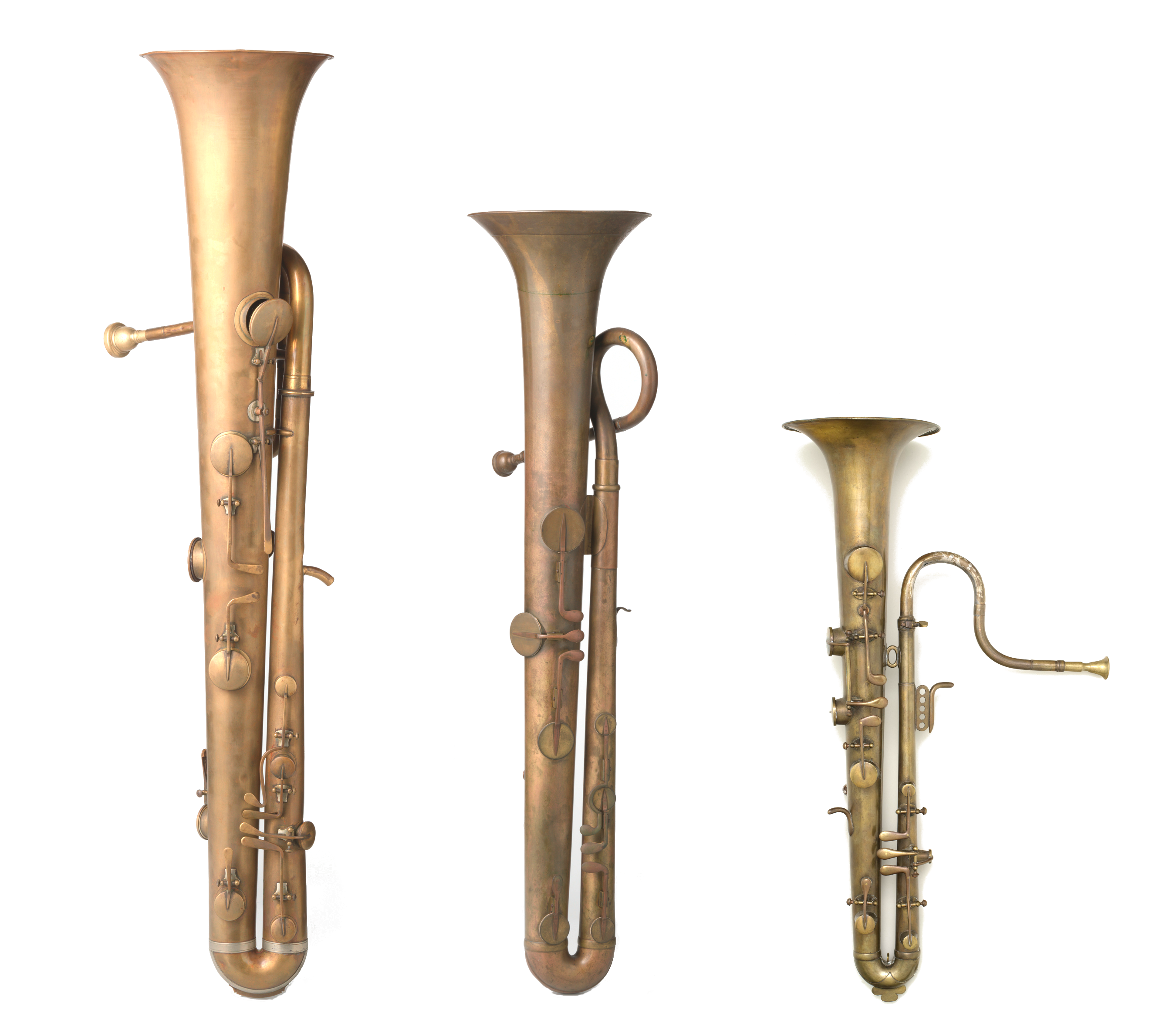
- Ophicleides: bass (the most common), alto (quinticlave) and soprano (rare). Rijksmuseum, Metropolitan Museum of Art

Brass instrument
- Classification: Aerophone; Brass instrument
- Hornbostel–Sachs classification: 423.21 (aerophone sounded by lip vibration with keys)
- Developed: 19th century

Playing range
- Range of bass ophicleide in C

Related instruments
- Keyed bugle; Serpent; Cimbasso; Sudrophone; Euphonium; Tuba

Musicians
- Cliff Bevan; Nick Byrne; Jean Prosper Guivier; Sam Hughes; Alan Lumsden; Everson Moraes; Patrick Wibart; Stephen Wick

Builders
- Benedikt Eppelsheim; Takao Nakagawa (valved); Wessex; Jérôme Wiss; Historical: Couesnon; Courtois; Gautrot; Halary; Sax

Sound sample
- The Bluebells of Scotland (excerpt) Ophicleide played by Tony George

The ophicleide (/ˈɒfɪklaɪd/ OFF-ih-klyde) is a family of conical-bore keyed brass instruments invented in early 19th-century France to extend the keyed bugle into the lower range. Of these, the bass ophicleide in eight-foot (8′) C or 9′ B♭ took root over the course of the 19th century in military bands and as the bass of orchestral brass sections throughout Western Europe, replacing the serpent and its later upright derivatives. By the end of the 19th century, however, it had been largely superseded, in bands by the euphonium and in orchestras by early forms of the modern tuba, some developed from valved ophicleides. The late 20th century saw a revival of interest in the instrument for historically informed performance practice, and ophicleides are built by a small number of manufacturers.

== Etymology ==
The instrument's name comes from the Greek words ὄφις (ophis, lit. 'serpent') and κλείς (kleis, lit. 'closure'), since it was conceived of as a serpent with keys.

== History ==
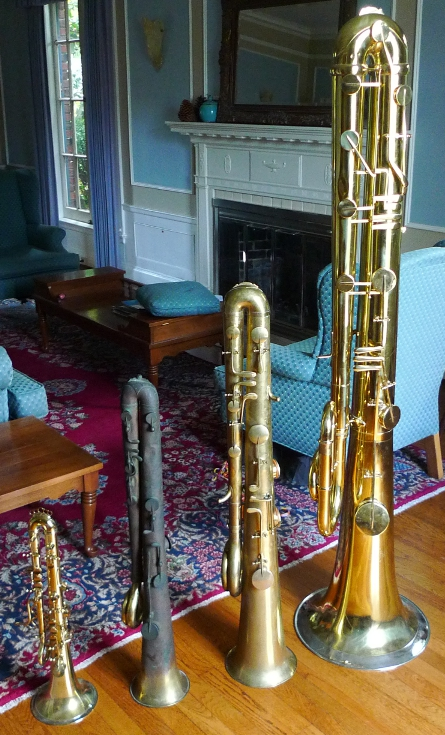
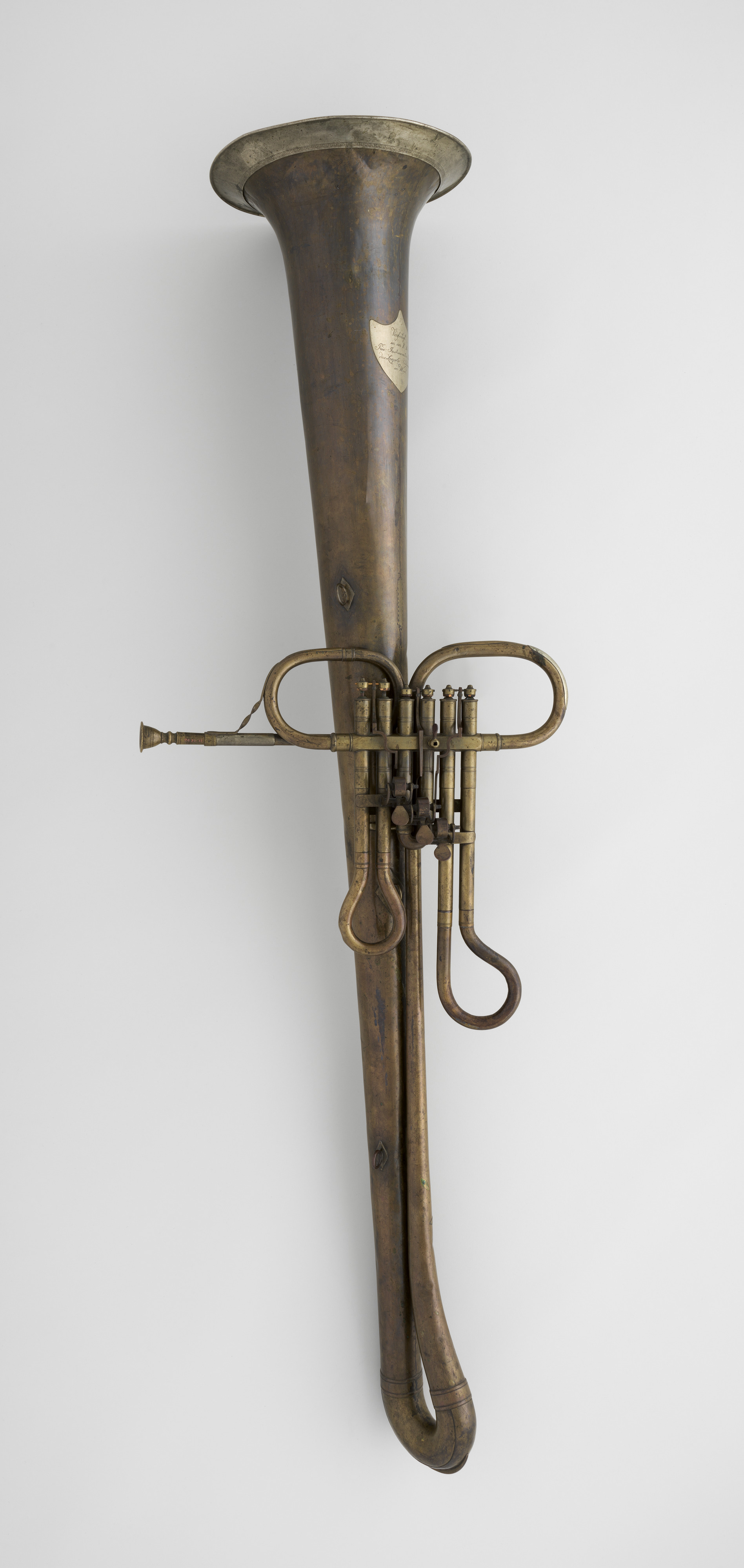
Ophicleides in four sizes, left to right: soprano replica by Robb Stewart, alto (quinticlave), bass, and contrabass, also by Stewart; Valved ophicleide built c. 1838–40 by Leopold Uhlmann, Vienna (Metropolitan Museum of Art, New York)

The ophicleide was invented in 1817 by the Paris instrument maker Jean Hilaire Asté (operating as Halary) as a set of instruments to extend the keyed bugle into lower registers, with an intention to replace the serpent. His 1821 patent described the (nominally bass) ophicleide in eight-foot (8′) C or 9′ B♭, an alto quinticlave built in 6′ F or 6½′ E♭, and a contrabass monstre in 12′ F. A rare instrument, the quinticlave enjoyed only brief use in military bands before being superseded by valved instruments; the clavicor with three Stölzel valves, followed quickly by alto and tenor saxhorns.

The contrabass in 12′ F or 13′ E♭, known in France as the monstre, was not widely adopted. Mendelssohn commissioned one for later performances of his 1846 oratorio Elijah, played by the French musician Prospère in performances in France and England. Four known instruments, all in F, survive in non-playable condition in museums. Only two playable contrabass ophicleides exist, both built in E♭ since the late 1980s by the Californian instrument maker Robb Stewart. Adolphe Sax in the 1840s built examples of a soprano ophicleide, an octave above the bass, and playable replicas have also been built by Stewart, including a smaller instrument in E♭.

The most successful size was the bass ophicleide, which became the bass voice of the brass section of the early Romantic orchestra outside of German-speaking countries, replacing the Renaissance-era serpent and its later upright derivatives. In scores, ophicleide first appeared in the banda (stage band) of the opera Olimpie by Gaspare Spontini in 1819. By mid-century, the instrument was standard in French serious operas by Meyerbeer, Halevy, and Auber, as well as English operas by Michael Balfe, Vincent Wallace, and others. In Italian opera, Rossini, Bellini, and Verdi scored the lowest brass part for serpentone or cimbasso in their early operas; by the mid-1830s these parts were often played on the ophicleide, until the appearance of valved instruments like the bombardone and pelittone. In Germany, Richard Wagner also composed for the ophicleide in his early works, anticipating performances in Paris, before later switching to the bass and contrabass tuba or contrabass trombone.

In the mid-19th century soon after the invention of valves, instruments with the same overall layout but replacing keys with valves appeared. These instruments were called valved ophicleides (German: Ventilophikleide; French: ophicléide à piston). With the continued invention of improved valve designs, these instruments gave rise to the first forms of early tuba, including the Baß-Tuba (patented 1835), which soon took hold in the orchestras of German-speaking countries.

In military bands, and in the civic brass band movement emerging in Britain and France, the ophicleide found a place in the bass section, often playing with the trombones. By the end of the century they had been replaced by valved brass instruments, and in Britain particularly by euphoniums, which were offered in competitions as prizes for winning ophicleide players. One of the last great ophicleide players was the English musician Samuel Hughes, teacher at the Royal Military School of Music, and ophicleidist in Jullien's orchestra and the Royal Italian Opera at Covent Garden.

The ophicleide (Portuguese: oficleide) was used in Brazilian choro bands well into the 20th century until it was superseded by the tuba, string bass, or seven-string guitar. The Brazilian musician pt:Irineu de Almeida was a major soloist on the instrument.

A revival of interest in the instrument took place in Britain the late 20th century, beginning with David Rycroft in 1965, along with several English ophicleide players including Alan Lumsden, Stephen Wick and Clifford Bevan, who were also involved in reviving the serpent. In the early 21st century, the London Ophicleide Ensemble and the Sydney Ophicleide Quartet were formed, and new works commissioned for the instrument including concertos by Simon Proctor and William Perry.

== Construction ==
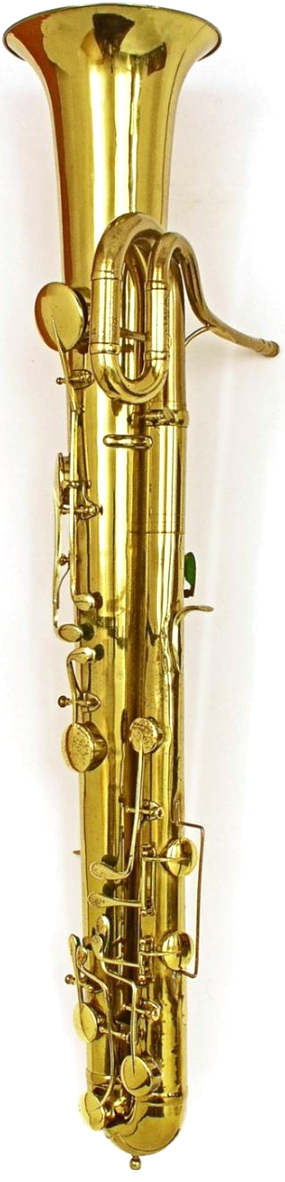
Ophicleide in C by Gautrot with nine keys, mid-19th century

The ophicleide's tubing has a similar length and arrangement as that of the upright serpents that preceded it, bending back on itself in a similar manner to the bassoon. The taper of the ophicleide's wide conical bore is similar to a saxophone of comparable range, with only a modest bell flare compared to other brass instruments.

It is played with a cup-shaped mouthpiece, similar to a modern trombone or euphonium mouthpiece. The patent describes the original instrument having nine keys, but it was later expanded to up to 11 and 12 keys, covering large tone holes sized proportionally to the bore diameter. Most surviving instruments have either nine or eleven keys.

Ophicleides were built in sufficient numbers, until as late as the 1920s, that instruments can still be found in playable or repairable condition. Modern replicas have been made, sometimes with modern improvements to materials, key work and acoustic design, usually to order by artisan instrument makers such as Benedikt Eppelsheim, Robb Stewart and Jérôme Wiss. In 2002 the editor of the Serpent Newsletter, Paul Schmidt, published instructions for building the Box-O-Cleide, a serviceable instrument built from plywood. The British-Chinese maker Wessex Tubas offer new ophicleides and quinticlaves, based on 19th century instruments by Halary and Gautrot, and the Leipzig instrument maker Takao Nakagawa makes a valved ophicleide in F with five rotary valves.

== Performance ==
Tony George playing an arrangement of "The Bluebells of Scotland" on ophicleide

Tony George playing an arrangement of "The Bluebells of Scotland" on quinticlave

Keyed brass instruments have fingering unlike other keyed wind instruments, where fingers usually cover and close tone holes (or on larger instruments, operate a key mechanism to close them remotely). On the ophicleide the tone holes are normally closed, and are uncovered to an open position when pressing the associated key lever.

The largest key-covered tone hole, just below the bell, is normally open and closes when its key is pressed. When open, this tone hole acts as the acoustic bell, the bell itself having little effect on sound or pitch. When closed, the air column is extended past the tone hole and up to the bell, lowering the pitch by one half step. The sound produced with no key levers pressed is the nominal pitch of the instrument, so the lowest note, obtained by closing the open key, is a semitone lower.

The player can obtain the available partials for a given air column length by changing embouchure, as with other brass instruments. When one of the normally closed tone holes is opened by pressing its key, it effectively makes that hole the "bell" of the instrument, with a corresponding shorter air column and higher series of partials. The left hand controls three such tone holes, plus the normally open top hole below the bell. Pitches in the upper and middle range of the instrument can be obtained by using only the left hand keys, the right hand holding and stabilizing the instrument.

The lowest register of the instrument is more complex, requiring between one and three additional right-hand keys to operate smaller tone holes closer to the mouthpiece. Right hand keys can also be used in the upper register as alternate fingerings to facilitate faster passages, or to improve intonation, known as venting.

== Repertoire ==
The ophicleide was initially taken up by French composers, particularly Hector Berlioz who was searching for a bass voice for the brass instruments of the orchestra. He wrote parts in his Messe solennelle (1824) for serpent, buccin, and ophicleide. His Symphonie fantastique (1830) calls for serpent and ophicleide, which are often performed in modern orchestras with two tubas, but some writers believe the original effect is lost, the tuba being too broad for the intended sound. Berlioz used ophicleide in many other works: Hymne des Marseillais (1830) calls for two ophicleides, Requiem: Grand messe des morts (1837) requires four, one in each of four brass choirs, and Symphonie funèbre et triomphale (1840) calls for six, playing two parts. Other French composers who wrote for ophicleide include Georges Bizet, Léo Delibes, César Franck, Fromental Halévy, and Édouard Lalo.

The Italian opera composers Vincenzo Bellini, Gioachino Rossini and Giuseppe Verdi would specify serpentone or cimbasso as the bass voice in their early operas, which were often later performed on the ophicleide before the advent of valved early Italian tubas such as the pelittone and bombardone.

In Germany, the rapid early adoption of the valved Baß-Tuba and its later derivatives kept the ophicleide largely at bay, although Felix Mendelssohn used it in his Overture for Winds (1838), incidental music to Athalia (1845), and his major oratorio Elijah (1847). His Overture to A Midsummer Night's Dream (1826) was originally scored for English bass horn, an upright serpent, but was published for ophicleide.

In Britain, the ophicleide's popularity in military bands and the emerging civic brass band movement led to the production of method books, études, and virtuoso solo works, often written for band competitions. Its use spilled over into orchestras, and British composers wrote for ophicleide late into the 19th century. Arthur Sullivan included ophicleide in his Overture di Ballo (1870) which, like Wagner's opera Rienzi, also has an additional part for serpent. Alice Mary Smith employed it in her concert overture Jason, or The Argonauts and the Sirens (1879).

Since the 20th century revival Nick Byrne, trombonist with the Sydney Symphony Orchestra, has recorded two CDs of works and arrangements for the ophicleide, and commissioned a concerto by the American composer William Perry. Titled Brass From the Past, Byrne performed the première in 2012 and later recorded it with Naxos Records. In 2014, Byrne established the Sydney Ophicleide Quartet with Jono Ramsey, Brad Lucas, and his Sydney Symphony Orchestra colleague Scott Kinmont, and commissioned works including a quartet from the Australian composer Houston Dunleavy. In France, Patrick Wibart is another modern exponent of the instrument, recording The Virtuoso Ophicleide in 2015, a CD of 19th-century solos and ensemble music. He teaches serpent at the Conservatoire de Paris, and serpent and ophicleide at the Conservatoire de Versailles Grand Parc.

== Bibliography ==
- Bevan, Clifford (2000). "Chapter III: Keyed Bugles and Ophicleides". The Tuba Family (2nd ed.). Winchester: Piccolo Press. p. 127–80. ISBN 1-872203-30-2. OCLC 993463927. OL 19533420M. Wikidata Q111040769.
- Daniels, David; Oertel, David; Rahbee, David (2022). Daniels' Orchestral Music (6th ed.). Lanham: Rowman & Littlefield. ISBN 978-1-4422-7520-1. LCCN 2021057082. Wikidata Q132725976.
- Dudgeon, Ralph T. (1997). "Keyed brass". In Herbert, Trevor; Wallace, John (eds.). The Cambridge Companion to Brass Instruments. Cambridge Companions. Cambridge: Cambridge University Press. p. 131–42. doi:10.1017/CCOL9780521563437. ISBN 978-1-139-00203-5. OCLC 460517551. OL 34482695M. Wikidata Q112852613.
- Herbert, Trevor; Myers, Arnold; Wallace, John, eds. (2019). The Cambridge Encyclopedia of Brass Instruments. Cambridge University Press. doi:10.1017/9781316841273. ISBN 978-1-316-63185-0. OL 34730943M. Wikidata Q136027509.
- Yeo, Douglas (2021). An Illustrated Dictionary for the Modern Trombone, Tuba, and Euphonium Player. Dictionaries for the Modern Musician. Peterson, Lennie (illustrator). Lanham: Rowman & Littlefield. ISBN 978-1-5381-5966-8. LCCN 2021020757. OCLC 1249799159. OL 34132790M. Wikidata Q111040546.
