= Shawnee Press =

Music publisher

- Parent company: Hal Leonard
- Founded: 1939
- Founder: Fred Waring
- Defunct: 2009
- Country of origin: United States
- Headquarters location: Milwaukee, Wisconsin
- Publication types: Sheet music
- Official website: www.shawneepress.com

Shawnee Press, Inc., was an independent print and recorded music publisher and for a time, the largest educational music publisher in the world.

The company published several music types including choral, vocal, keyboard, handbell, instrumental, and classroom in a variety of styles. The company added sacred music offerings with the acquisition of Harold Flammer, Inc., followed by launching GlorySound, an imprint targeted to the growing contemporary Christian market.

Shawnee Press was founded in 1939 by famed bandleader/choirmaster from the Golden Age of radio and television, Fred Waring. Waring and his famous singing group “The Pennsylvanians” achieved national prominence on radio and television in the 1930s through the 1970s. As the group grew in popularity, school and church choral directors began requesting copies of Waring’s unique arrangements, and Waring responded by starting a music publisher based in New York City.

Originally named "Words and Music" the new venture included Jack Benny as one of the original investors along with Waring. Waring eventually bought out the other investors and moved the company to his native Pennsylvania, 80 miles outside of New York City to Shawnee on Delaware (and eventually Delaware Water Gap). Accordingly, he changed the name of the company from "Words and Music" to "Shawnee Press". In 1952, Shawnee Press acquired Paull-Pioneer Music, publisher of On the Banks of the Wabash, Far Away and the work of E. T. Paull.

After Waring's death in 1984, his widow, Virginia Waring, retained ownership of the company until selling it in 1989 to the Music Sales Group, a global music publishing company based in London, England with offices in New York City and around the world.

In September 2005, the company relocated to Nashville, Tennessee. In 2009, Milwaukee-based Hal Leonard Corporation acquired Shawnee Press (along with other Music Sales Group USA music print publications) with Shawnee becoming a publishing imprint of Hal Leonard. The Nashville office was soon thereafter closed and all functions folded into the operations of Hal Leonard.
