= François Sudre (1844–1912) =

François Sudre (1844–1912) was the inventor of the sudrophone, a brass instrument resembling an ophicleide in shape, and patented in 1892.

Born in Carcassonne, southern France, he was a director of Comte et Cie., which in 1873 or 1875 had acquired Halary, the instrument-maker founded by Jean Hilaire Asté in 1804, and who had patented the ophicleide in 1821.
