= John Wallace (trumpeter) =

Scottish trumpeter and composer (1949–2026)

John Wallace CBE FRSE
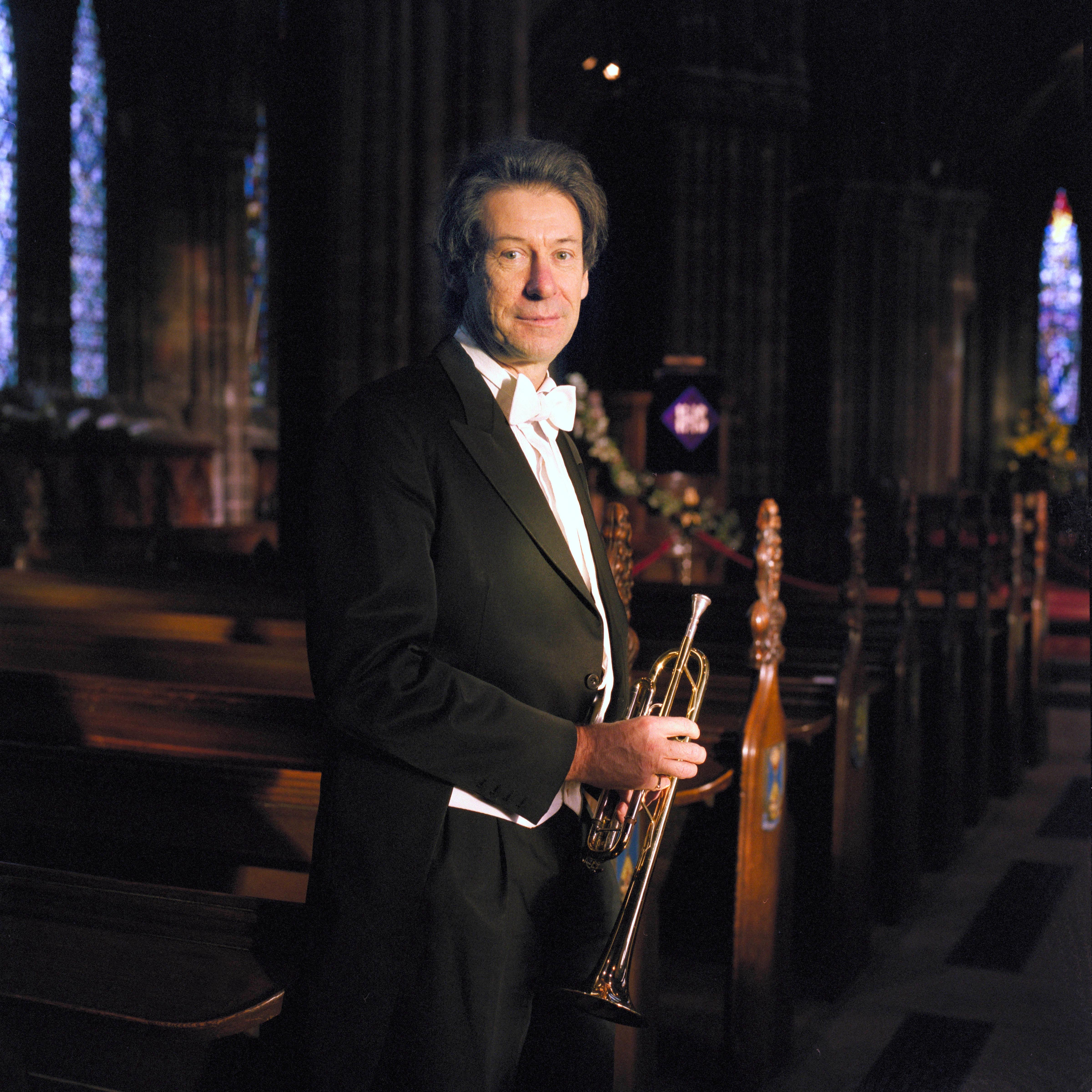
- Wallace in 2006
- Born: 14 April 1949; Methil, Fife, Scotland
- Died: 11 January 2026 (aged 76)
- Education: King's College, Cambridge; Royal Academy of Music; University of York
- Occupations: Trumpeter; Composer; Academic teacher
- Organizations: National Youth Orchestra of Great Britain; Philharmonia Orchestra; Royal Conservatoire of Scotland; The Wallace Collection
- Awards: Queen's Medal for Music

John Williamson Wallace (14 April 1949 – 11 January 2026) was a Scottish trumpet player, composer and arts educator. He came from a family tradition of brass band playing. He performed as a trumpet player of leading London orchestras, the principal trumpet of the Philharmonia Orchestra from 1976 to 1995. Solo performances included prominently playing a trumpet solo alongside Kiri Te Kanawa at the wedding of Prince Charles and Lady Diana Spencer in 1981. He founded his own brass ensemble, The Wallace Collection, in 1986. Wallace was principal of the Royal Conservatoire of Scotland from 2002 to 2014, and held leading positions in associations for educational matters and historic brass instruments.

== Life and career ==
Wallace was born in Methil, Fife, on 14 April 1949. His father Christopher Wallace worked as a joiner at the Tullis Russell Paper Mill in Glenrothes and played in the Tullis Russell Mills Band for 65 years. At the age of seven, John was given a cornet and taught to play, initially by his father. He soon joined the junior band and later progressed to the senior band, being the fourth generation of his family to play in a brass band. In 1964, he was selected to play in the National Youth Orchestra of Great Britain. He played Haydn's Trumpet Concerto on a tour with the orchestra then.

Wallace attended Buckhaven High School before going on to study music at King's College, Cambridge, where his director of studies was David Willcocks. He then went on to study composition, with trumpet as a second study, studying at the Royal Academy of Music with Alan Bush and at the University of York with David Blake. He made money to pay for his studies playing second trumpet for both the Festival Ballet touring orchestra and the Royal Northern Sinfonia.

=== Performing career ===
Finding that composition did not pay, Wallace joined the Royal Philharmonic Orchestra as co-principal trumpet in 1974. He auditioned for the London Symphony Orchestra, then conducted by André Previn. In 1976 he began a nineteen-year stint as principal trumpet of the Philharmonia Orchestra, jointly led by Riccardo Muti and Lorin Maazel.

Alongside his orchestral duties Wallace developed an extensive solo career, of which the most prominent public high spot was playing a widely televised trumpet solo alongside Kiri Te Kanawa at the wedding of Prince Charles and Lady Diana Spencer in July 1981. Wallace was the solo trumpeter in many recordings of major compositions for the instrument. He played the world premieres of trumpet concertos by Malcolm Arnold, James MacMillan, Peter Maxwell Davies, Dominic Muldowney, Robert Saxton, Gunther Schuller, Tim Souster, among others. He rediscovered rarely played music on historic instruments, such as by the Cyfarthfa Band and arrangements of Haydn string quartets performed by the Wallace Collection..

In 1986, following a period with the Philip Jones Brass Ensemble, he founded the Wallace Collection Ensemble, a flexible brass interest group. They toured in Europe and to the United States, Canada, Argentina, Australia, Malaysia, Japan, Hong Kong, and West and South Africa, and recorded CDs.

=== Educator ===
Wallace taught at the Royal Academy of Music, where he was instrumental, as head of brass, for teaching the use of historic brass instruments. In 2002 he was appointed principal of the then Royal Scottish Academy of Music and Drama in Glasgow. During his tenure the Academy's activities were expanded, with programs for musical theatre and digital film and television from 2004, and dance including modern ballet, and jazz, production and design from 2009; it was renamed the Royal Conservatoire of Scotland in 2011. Wallace initiated new buildings, and was able to include collections of historic brass instruments such as Edward Tarr's into the Conservatoire's collection. When he retired from the post in 2014, he was appointed Emeritus Professor of Brass.

Wallace served as a member of the Scottish Funding Council for Further and Higher Education. In the Music Education Partnership Group (MEPG), leading the program We Make Music Scotland, he worked towards free instrumental tuition in state schools of Scotland.

=== Composer and writer ===
Wallace's compositions included a Symphony for Brass Band, a one-act opera, Opsnizing Dad, performed with Jamie MacDougall, and a song-cycle, The Centre of Things. For the opera, he requested 19th-century instruments.

He was a co-editor for Companion to Brass Instruments, History of The Trumpet, and The Cambridge Encyclopedia of Brass Instruments.

=== Personal life ===
Wallace was married to Liz; they had children.

Wallace died on 11 January 2026, at the age of 76.

== Honours ==
Wallace was appointed Officer of the Order of the British Empire (OBE) in the 1995 Birthday Honours list, for services to music. In 2003, he was elected a Fellow of the Royal Society of Edinburgh (FRSE). In the 2011 New Year Honours list he was promoted to Commander of the Order of the British Empire (CBE) for services to music, dance and drama education in Scotland. In 2014, he received an Honorary doctorate of music from the University of St Andrews. He received the Christopher Monk Award from the Historic Brass Society "for outstanding contributions to the field of historic brass through research, performance and education" in 2019.

In 2021 Wallace was awarded the Queen's Medal for Music by Queen Elizabeth II, as an "outstanding individual casting a major positive influence on the musical life of the nation". He received the ITG Honorary Award and the Royal Philharmonic Society's Honorary Membership in 2025.

Wallace was a fellow of the Royal Academy of Music, the Royal College of Music, the Royal Northern College of Music, the Royal Irish Academy of Music, the Leeds Conservatoire, and the Trinity Laban Conservatoire.
