= Adolf Rzepko =

Polish musician

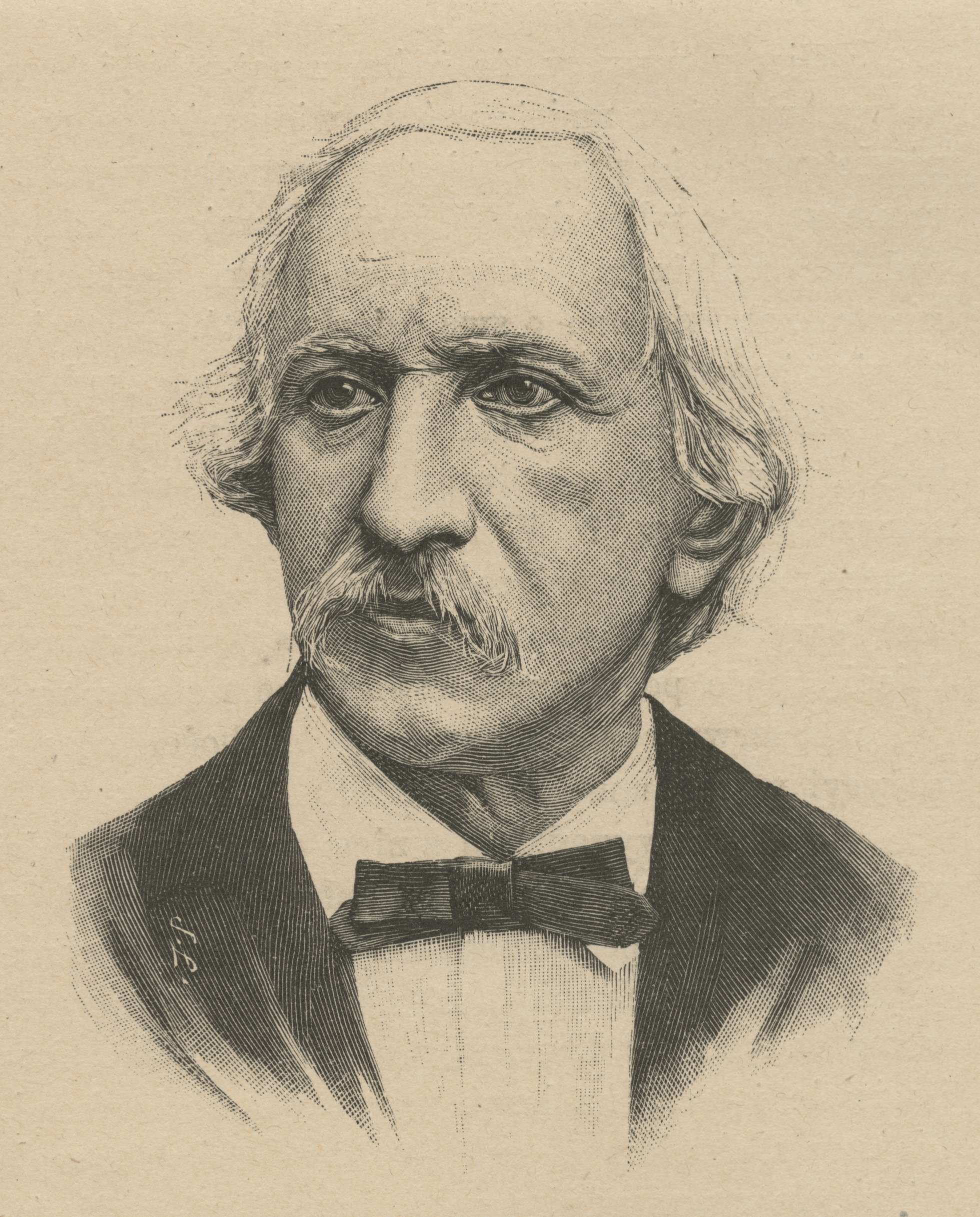

Adolf Rzepko (1825–1892) was a Polish composer, oboist, choral and orchestral conductor, and pianist.

He was a disciple of Václav Tomášek. He was mainly active as a performer (he served for many years as the Wielki Theatre orchestra's principal oboe), a choral conductor and a pedagogue. He was the author of two music treatises: The principles of music (1869) and A piano school.

Rzepko was born in Prague. He died in Warsaw.

== External side ==
- Adolf Rzepko's music sheets in digital library Polona.pl
