= Ján Valašťan Dolinský =

Ján Valašťan Dolinský (15 February 1892, Békéscsaba (Békéšská Čaba) – 2 March 1965, Nitra) was a Slovak composer, teacher, journalist, esperantist and collector of folk songs.

He graduated from a teacher's institute and then worked as a teacher. From 1928 he was a teacher in Martin, where he simultaneously worked in the Music department of Matica slovenská.

== Works ==
=== Folk song collections ===
- Čabianske ľudové piesne pre mužský zbor (1923)
- Z našich hôr a dolín (1941)

=== Music for poems ===
He wrote music for poems of many well-known Slovak poets and it appeared under the name Vám všetkým (1922) and under other names

=== Song books ===
- Môj spevník
- Slávme slávne...

=== Textbooks ===
- Všeobecná náuka o hudbe (General Music Science)

=== Esperanto texts ===
- Mluvnica a slovník slovensko-esperantský (1936; Slovak-Esperanto Grammar and Dictionary; the first Slovak Esperanto textbook)
- Malý esperantsko slovenský slovník (1948; Small Esperanto-Slovak Dictionary)
- Učebnica jazyka esperanto (1949; Textbook of Esperanto)

=== Works in Esperanto ===
His original songs include:

- En aŭtuno
- Rememoro
- Profunda okulparo

Translations:

- Je la foiro en Detva by Timrava (Božena Slančíková)
- Adam Ŝangala by Ladislav Nádaši-Jégé
- translations of works by Pavol Országh Hviezdoslav
