= Gialdino Gialdini =

Italian composer

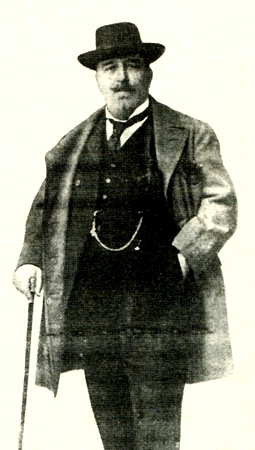
- Born: 10 November 1843; Pescia, Tuscany, Italy
- Died: 6 March 1919 (aged 75); Pescia, Tuscany, Italy
- Occupations: Italian composer and conductor

Gialdino Gialdini (10 November 1842 – 6 March 1919) was an Italian composer and orchestra conductor.

Gialdini was born in Pescia, Grand Duchy of Tuscany, and studied at Florence with Teodulo Mabellini. He won a prize offered by the Pergola Theatre of that city for the best opera, with Rosmunda, which met, however, with an unfavourable reception when produced in 1868. After two more operas he tired of composing operas and started conducting opera productions, to international acclaim. In 1889 he conducted Wagner's Lohengrin at Bologna. Later he returned to composing operas. In September 1904 he became the Artistic Director of the Conservatorio Giuseppe Verdi in the then Austrian city of Trieste but had to abandon the post when Italy entered the war against Austria in May 1915. He then returned to his native Pescia for retirement, and died there aged 76.

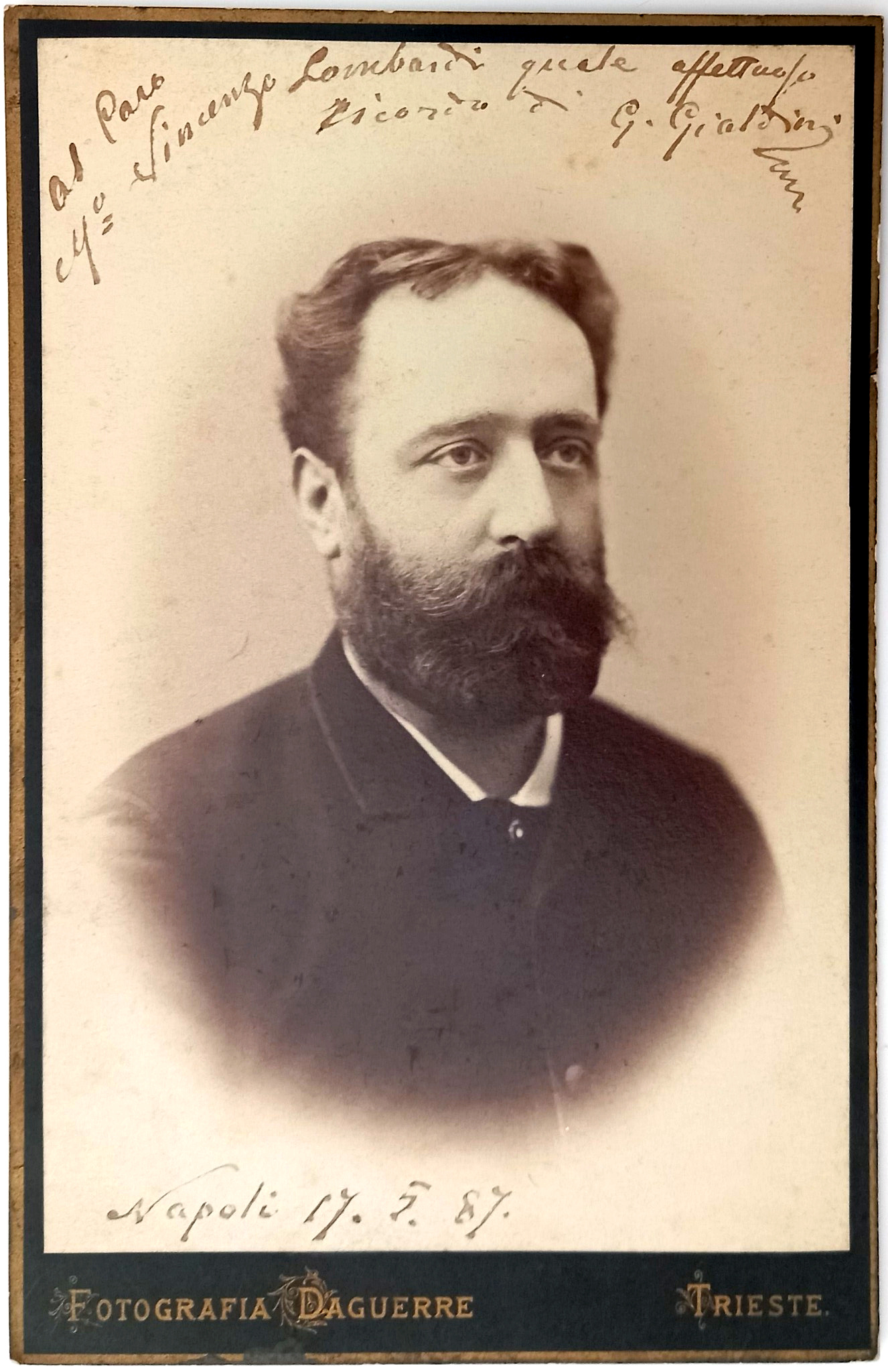
Cabinet photograph of Gialdino Gialdini bearing his signature and a handwritten dedication to Vincenzo Lombardi, dated 1887.

== Works ==
- Rosmunda (opera, premiered 5 March 1868 at the Teatro Pergola, Florence)
- La secchia rapita (opera buffa, premiered 1872 at the Teatro Goldoni, Florence)
- l'Idolo cinese (opera buffa, premiered 1874 at the Teatro delle Logge, Florence)
- I due soci (opera buffa, premiered 24 February 1892 at the Teatro Brunetti, Bologna)
- La Pupilla (opera in 2 acts, premiered 23 October 1896 at the Societá Filarmonica Drammatica, Trieste)
- La Bufera (opera, premiered 26 November 1910 at the Politeama Ciscutti, Pola)
- Album vocale
- Minuetto (for string orchestra)
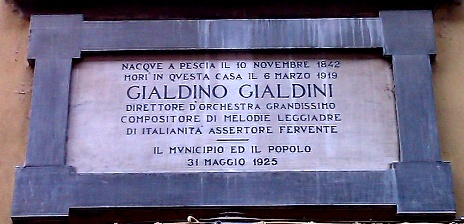
  Plaque at the house where Gialdini lived in Pescia. It is unclear why it gives 1842 as his birthyear; all other sources, including many published before 1925, give 1843.
- Eco della Lombardia (collection of 50 popular songs, edited by Giardini and Giulio Ricordi)

== Sources ==
- "GIALDINI, Gialdino" in Dizionario Biografico degli Italiani (Vol. 54; 2000); at Treccani.it (in Italian)

== Links ==
Gialdino Gialdini — historical essay, Triumphal March audio recording, photographic portrait, and bilingual documentation. (Internet Archive)
