= Sam Hughes (musician) =

British 19th century ophicleide player

Samuel Hughes (9 December 1823 – 1 April 1898) was a British ophicleide player and teacher, and considered one of the most important British players of the instrument in its short history.

== Biography ==
Samuel Hughes was born in Trentham, Staffordshire, England. He began his career playing the ophicleide in one of the newly popular brass bands, the Cyfarthfa Brass Band in Merthyr Tydfil, Wales. He played with the band from the mid-1850s to about 1860. In 1860 the band won the national contest at The Crystal Palace, but Hughes was no longer with them. He also played with Louis Antoine Jullien's orchestra. There he became a star, known especially for his ophicleide solo of "Ruddier Than the Cherry" from Acis and Galatea. Even George Bernard Shaw, who had written disparagingly of the instrument (it had been "born obsolete") was impressed with this song when he heard it at Covent Garden.

Hughes became professor of ophicleide at the Royal Military School of Music at Kneller Hall and at the Guildhall School of Music. In the late 1870s he unsuccessfully petitioned the Royal Society of Musicians for support due to the deteriorating state of his teeth and dental health, which was preventing him from playing.

He died in poverty in 1898 in Three Mile Cross,Berkshire, England. The ophicleide died with him. His widow received a small grant for his burial from the Royal Society of Musicians. His instrument is on display in the Cyfarthfa Castle Museum, regarded as one of the best surviving examples of its type.

== Bibliography ==
- Herbert, Trevor; Myers, Arnold; Wallace, John, eds. (2019). The Cambridge Encyclopedia of Brass Instruments. Cambridge University Press. doi:10.1017/9781316841273. ISBN 978-1-316-63185-0. OL 34730943M. Wikidata Q136027509.
