= Battle of the Nations (song) =

"Battle of the nations"

Song
- Published: E.T. Paull Music Co.
- Released: 1915
- Songwriter(s): E.T. Paull

Battle of the Nations is a World War I era song released in 1915. E.T. Paull wrote the music and lyrics for the piece. The song was published by E.T. Paull Music Co. of New York, New York. On the cover, there is a colorful depiction of a battle scene. On the borders are seals from different countries, including Japan, Belgium, France, and Germany. The song is a "companion piece to the celebrated Napoleon's last charge descriptive march," as stated on the cover.
