= Thomas Wood (composer) =

English composer (1892–1950)

Thomas Wood (28 November 1892 – 19 November 1950) was an English composer and author.

Wood was born in Chorley, Lancashire and attended Barrow Grammar School, also in Lancashire, before studying at the University of Oxford and the Royal College of Music. In 1919 he was appointed Director of Music at Tonbridge School in Kent, returning to Oxford in 1924 to teach at Exeter College. During this period he composed several choral-orchestral works including Forty Singing Seamen (1925), Master Mariners (1927) and The Ballad of Hampstead Heath (1927). He went to Australia in 1930 and spent over two years travelling across the country. This prompted him to write his book Cobbers (1934) which the Australian Dictionary of Biography describes as "still the most perceptive and captivating characterization of Australia and its people ever written by a visitor". He continued to compose and wrote several other books, including an autobiography, True Thomas (1936), before his death of a heart attack in 1950. He had a longstanding interest in the supernatural, something detailed in the final part of his autobiography.

Wood married Miss St Osyth Mahala Eustace-Smith (1886 -1970) of Wormingford at Wormingford Church in 1924. Before the marriage, on 7 June 1918 The London Gazette reported that St Osyth had been awarded an OBE for her work as "Hon Secretary, Essex Local War Pensions Committee". After the marriage she moved into Parsonage Hall, Bures and became great benefactor to the local community. She died at Wasperton, Warwickshire aged 84.

== Bibliography ==
- Cobbers (Oxford University Press, 1934)
- Cobbers campaigning (Jonathan Cape, 1940)
- Music and boyhood (Oxford University Press, 1925)
- True Thomas (Jonathan Cape, 1936)
