= Teatro Duse =

Coordinates: 44°29′19″N 11°20′53″E

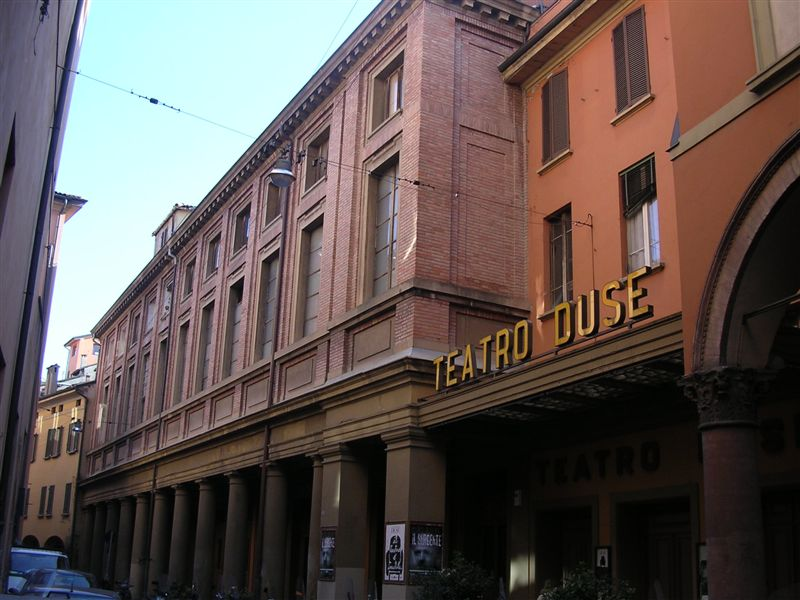
Facade of the Teatro Duse.

The Teatro Duse is one of the oldest extant theaters in the city of Bologna, Italy. Located in the Palazzo del Giglio, the theatre's address is at 42 Via Cartoleria, 40124. Built by the engineer Antonio Brunetti, it opened as the Teatro Brunetti in 1822. In 1898 it was re-named for the actress Eleonora Duse. While more frequently used as a venue for plays during its history, the theatre has also presented other types of performance such as operas and concerts. The opera composer Guglielmo Zuelli conducted operas at the theatre in the mid to late 1880s. In the 1890s the conductor Antonino Palminteri was active as a resident opera conductor at the theatre. Gialdino Gialdini's opera I due soci premiered at the theatre on 24 February 1892.
