= Sudrophone =

Valved brass instrument with mirliton

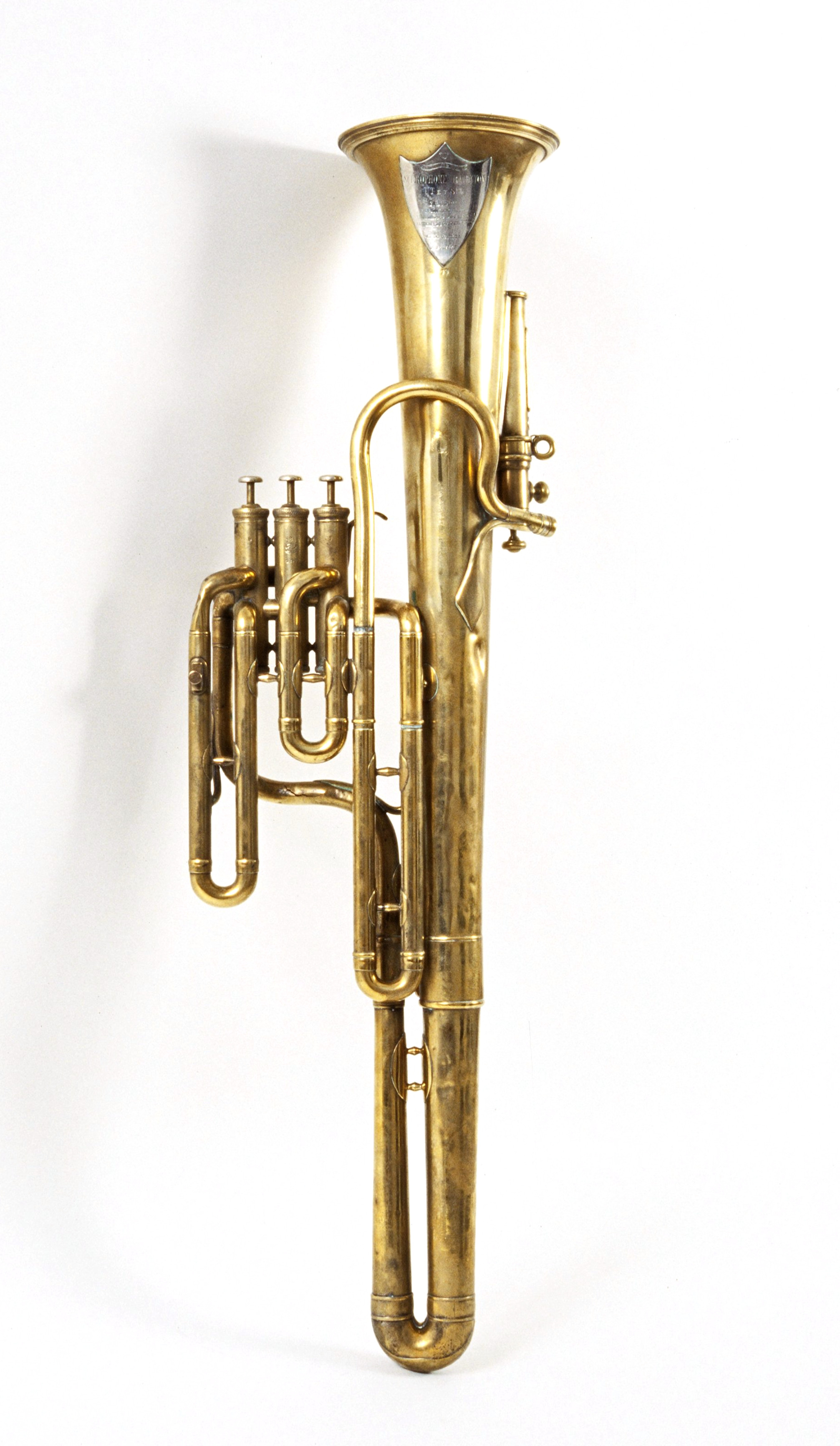
Baritone sudrophone in C/B♭ by F. Sudre, c. 1900. Note the mirliton attached to the bell, right

The sudrophone is a brass instrument invented by the French instrument maker François Sudre (1844–1912). Its shape resembles that of an ophicleide. It was patented in 1892.

A sudrophone has a conical bore and three or four Perinet valves. Its length is 86 centimetres (34 in) and the bell diameter is 17 centimetres (6.7 in). The "valve" nearest the mouthpiece on the bell throat controls a silk membrane to create a nasal effect, which Sudre designed to make a sound like a cello or a bassoon. The instrument is very similar to the baritone horn and helicon. Acoustically these resembled the saxhorns, but the shape was different as the main tube was doubled back on itself, giving a vertical appearance reminiscent of an ophicleide. This design choice was made by Sudre to make the instrument stand out more amongst the primarily saxhorn-shaped brass instruments that were much more popular.

The unique feature of these instruments was the mirliton, a kazoo-like apparatus attached to the side of the bell with a membrane which vibrates sympathetically, creating a buzzing effect. The device membrane can be engaged or disengaged by the player, so it can also function as a normal saxhorn-like brass instrument.
