= Harry Kennedy (songwriter) =

English ventriloquist and songwriter

William Henry Kennedy, known as Harry Kennedy (c. 1849 or 1855 - January 3, 1894) was a popular ventriloquist and songwriter.

Kennedy was born in Manchester, England, around 1855 (obituaries stated his age as either 39 or 45, the latter putting his birth year around 1849), and was a talented ventriloquist as a child. After working briefly as a teacher and seaman, by 1871 he had made it to Montreal and began performing as a ventriloquist. He debuted in New York City in 1874 and traveled with various minstrel groups. In 1890, he opened "Harry Kennedy's Theatre" in New York, but sold out and moved after one season to a smaller venue, the Alhambra, on Coney Island. He also managed a bar on Fulton Street in Brooklyn.

Songs he wrote include "When Peggy And I Are Wed", "Molly and I and the Baby", "Say Au Revoir, But Not Good-bye", "A Flower from Mother's Grave", "Cradle's Empty, Baby's Gone", "An Old Fashioned Photograph", "Patsy Branigan", "I Owe Ten Dollars to O'Grady", "I Had Fifteen Dollars in my Inside Pocket", "Hush Don't Wake the Baby", "Grandmother's Birthday" and "Little Empty Stockings By the Fire".

He married his first wife, Nellie [Brock], in 1876, and she died in 1883. He married again in 1886 and his second spouse (Mary, sister of Nellie Brock) died in 1890. Survived by five minor children, Kennedy died at his home in Brooklyn of Bright's disease on January 3, 1894, and was buried at Holy Cross Cemetery, Brooklyn.
