= Saxtuba =

19th-century brass instrument

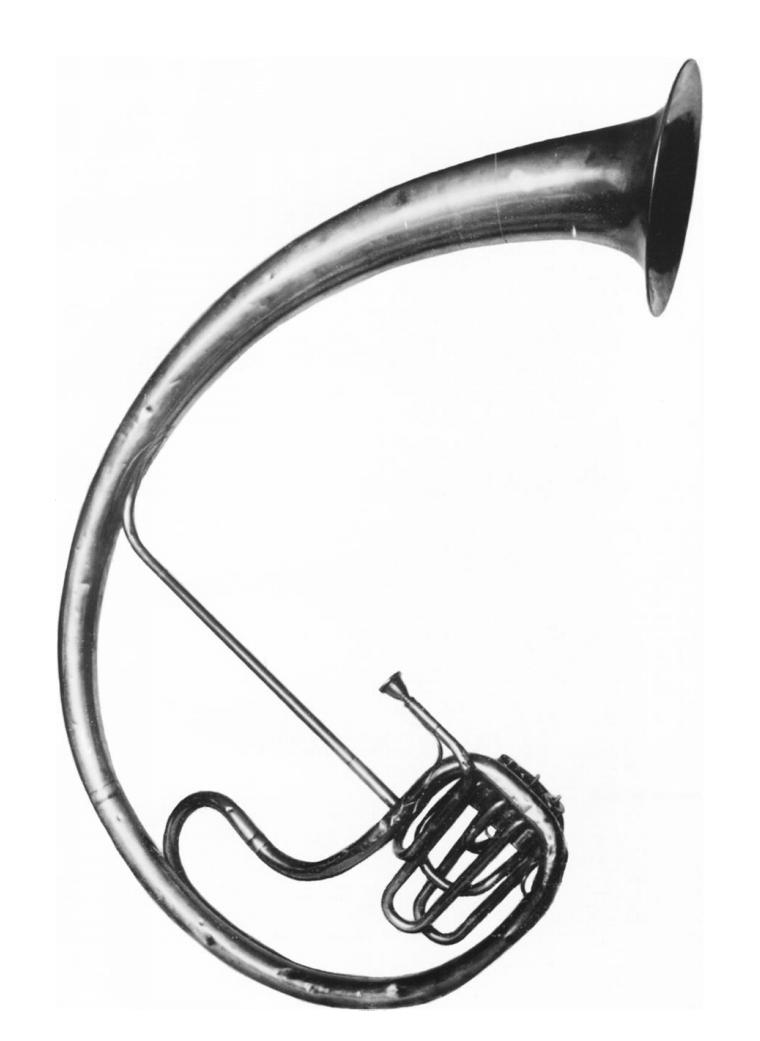

Brass instrument
- Classification: Wind; Brass; Aerophone

Playing range
- Written range

Related instruments
- Saxhorn, Saxotromba; Trumpet, Bugle; Tuba, Wagner tuba Cornu, Buccina, Roman tuba

The saxtuba is an obsolete valved brass wind instrument conceived by the Belgian instrument-maker Adolphe Sax around 1845. The design of the instrument was inspired by the ancient Roman cornu and tuba. The saxtubas, which comprised a family of half-tube and whole-tube instruments of varying pitches, were first employed in Fromental Halévy's opera Le Juif errant (The Wandering Jew) in 1852. Their only other public appearance of note was at a military ceremony on the Champ de Mars in Paris in the same year. The term "saxtuba" may also refer to the bass saxhorn.

== History ==
In the 1770s, the French artist Jacques-Louis David carried out extensive researches into the ancient Roman instruments that appeared on Trajan's Column in Rome. Two of these instruments – the straight tuba and the curved cornu – were revived in Revolutionary France as the buccin and tuba curva. To devise the saxtubas, Sax merely added valves to these natural instruments, thus providing them with chromatic compasses. Furthermore, he designed them in such a way that the valves were hidden from general view, thus giving the impression that the instruments were primitive natural trumpets only capable of playing notes from a single harmonic series.

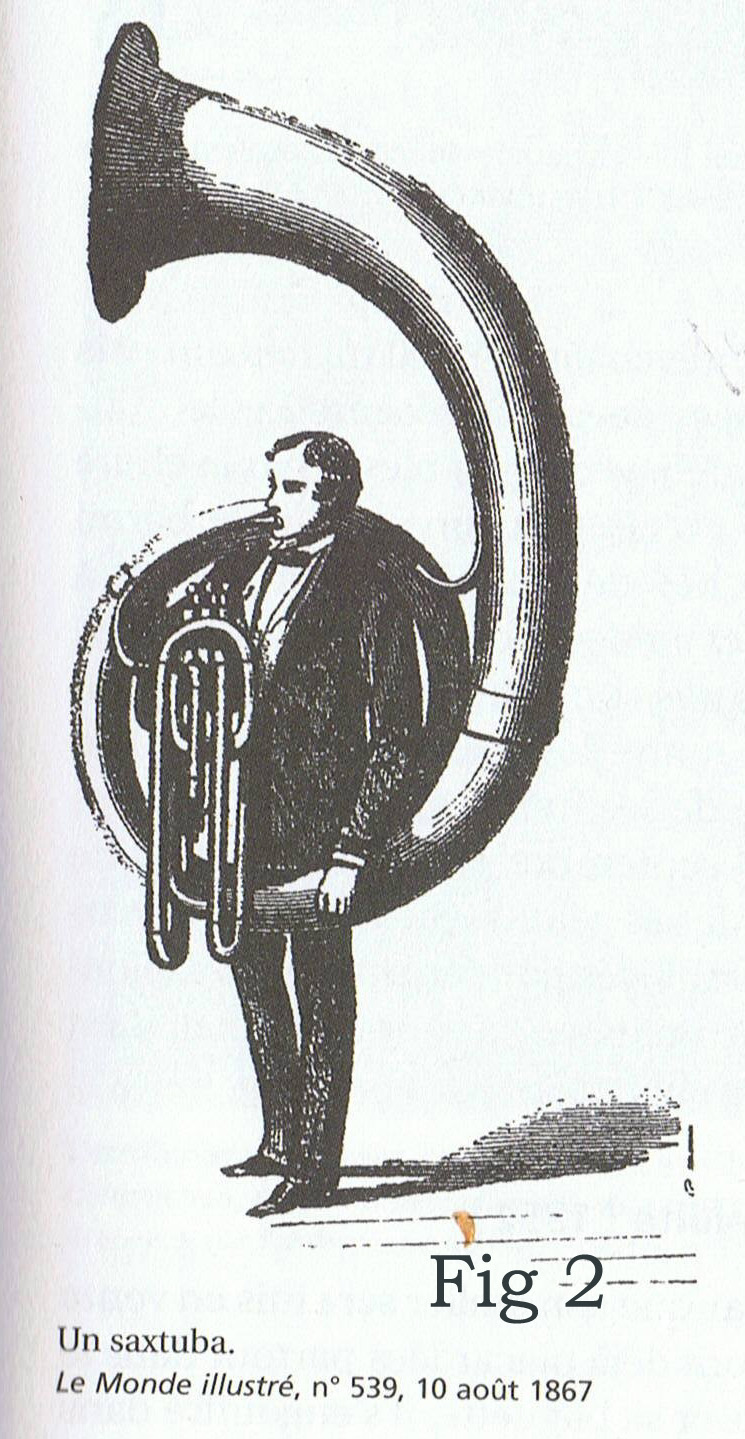
A saxtubist

The saxtuba was first conceived by Sax at his workshop in the Rue Saint-Georges in Paris around 1845. On 5 May 1849 Sax applied for a patent for a series of brasswind instruments fitted with cylinders. On 16 July 1849 he was granted French Patent 8351. The saxtubas were patented in 1852, in a certificate of addition to the main patent of 1849. Like Sax's saxhorns and saxotrombas, which were also covered by this patent, the saxtubas were equipped with pavillons tournants – that is to say, their bells could be pointed forward – which was considered ideal for instruments intended to be played by marching or mounted bands in the open air.

The cylinders referred to in the patent application were piston valves which allowed the player to lower the pitch of the instrument's natural or open harmonics by one or more semitones. In 1843 Sax had patented his own version of the Berliner Pumpenventil (lit. 'Berlin piston valve'), which was patented ten years earlier in Prussia by Wilhelm Friedrich Wieprecht in 1833. These were independent valves, which were not designed to be used in combination with one another, though the intonational problems that arose when they were so used could often be corrected by the player's technique. This was especially true in the case of the higher-pitched half-tube instruments, which were usually provided with just three valves, allowing the player to lower the pitch of any open note by one, two or three semitones when the valves were used one at a time, or by four, five or six semitones when the valves were used in combination. Before the invention of compensating valves (which could be used in combination without producing faulty intonation), lower-pitched instruments generally required extra valves in order to lower the pitch of an open note by more than three semitones.

In 1859 Sax applied his system of six independent valves to the saxtuba.

The saxtubas made their first public appearance at the premiere of Fromental Halévy's opera Le Juif errant (The Wandering Jew) at the Paris Opera on 23 April 1852. At the time, Sax was musical director of the Opéra's stage band (or banda), so it was not unusual for instruments of his design to be showcased in popular productions. Although Sax appears to have designed the saxtuba as early as 1845, it is possible that he did not actually manufacture any specimens until they were required for Le Juif errant in 1852.

In the opera, the saxtubas are first heard on stage in the Triumphal March (No. 17) at the end of Act III. A total of eight different sizes of saxtuba were required to play ten individual parts. The saxtubas are not referred to by this name in the only surviving copy of the full score; instead they are listed as saxhorns, which suggests that the decision to use saxtubas was a late one. In the score the instruments are designated as follows:

French
Petite Sax-horn aigue en Si♭
Sax-horn soprano en Mi♭
Cornet à pistons en Si♭ [Sax-horn au pistons en Si♭ in Act V]
Sax-horn Contre Alto en Si♭
1^{er} Saxhorn alto en Mi♭
2^{e} Saxhorn alto en Mi♭
Sax horn baryton en Si♭
Sax horn basse en Si♭
Sax horn C:basse en Mi♭
Sax horn C:basse en Si♭

English
Sopranino saxhorn in B♭
Soprano saxhorn in E♭
Cornet in B♭ ["saxhorn with pistons in B♭" in Act V]
Contralto saxhorn in B♭
1st Alto saxhorn in E♭
2nd Alto saxhorn in E♭
Baritone saxhorn in B♭
Bass saxhorn in B♭
Contrabass saxhorn in E♭
Contrabass saxhorn in B♭

Opening bars of the March in Act V of Le Juif errant

The only other appearance of the stage band in the opera occurs in the Judgment dernier ("Last Judgment") in Act V, which also includes parts for four saxophones, one of which was played by Sax himself. On both occasions the performers are instructed to march across the stage, playing martial music typical of the period as they do so. This music has been compared to the Apothéose from Berlioz's Grande symphonie funèbre et triomphale of 1840. François-Joseph Fétis, who reviewed the opera's première, reported that the sound of the Sax's saxtuba banda was out of all proportion to that of the orchestra in the pit. At subsequent performances the instruments were muted, which resulted in a much better balance between the two bodies.

Le Juif errant was not a success, despite being given fifty times over two seasons at the Paris Opéra; when it disappeared from the repertoire, it took the saxtuba with it. The only other notable public appearance of the saxtubas occurred less than a month after the opera's première, on 10 May 1852, when twelve saxtubas participated in a military ceremony on the Champ de Mars, Paris, in which the President of the French Republic Louis Napoleon distributed the colours to his army. Although a total of 1500 musicians from thirty regiments were employed in the ceremony, the twelve saxtubas overwhelmed all the other instruments. According to an eyewitness the saxtubas were played by the same civilian players who had played them at the Opéra the previous month.

The existence of a few saxtubas from the late nineteenth or early twentieth century – including six specimens manufactured by Sax's son Adolphe-Edouard – suggests that the instrument did not become completely obsolete after the disappearance of Le Juif errant from the repertoire. Records preserved in the Bibliothèque-Musée de l'Opéra National de Paris indicate sporadic appearances of saxtubas of various sizes in operatic productions throughout the late nineteenth century, both as solo instruments in the pit and as theatrical instruments in the onstage banda. Jules Massenet added a saxtuba to his pit orchestra in Le roi de Lahore (1877); Charles Gounod used the same instrument in Le tribut de Zamora in 1881. Massenet also wrote a solo for contrabass saxtuba in C in Esclarmonde, which was first performed at the Opéra-Comique in 1889.

== Sources ==
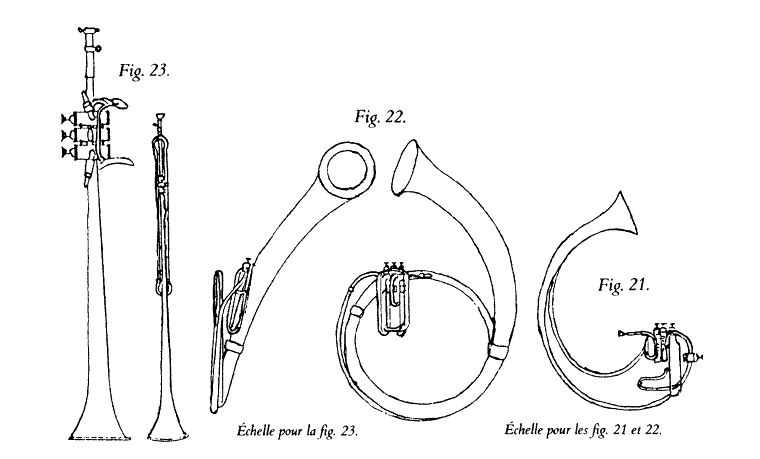
Sketches of Sax's saxtuba designs from his patent of 1849

In 1855, in a revised version of his Treatise on Instrumentation, the French composer Hector Berlioz described several of Sax's newly invented instruments, including the saxtubas:

These are instruments with mouth-piece and a mechanism of three cylinders; they are of enormous sonorousness, carrying far, and producing extraordinary effect in military bands intended to be heard in the open air. They should be treated exactly like sax-horns; merely taking into account the absence of the low double-bass in E♭, and of the drone in B♭. Their shape—elegantly rounded—recalls that of antique trumpets on a grand scale.

This description was repeated verbatim in an article Berlioz contributed to The Musical Times and Singing Class Circular five years later. The two contrabass instruments which Berlioz says are lacking (the double-bass [contrebasse] in E♭ and the drone [bourdon] in B♭) are in fact included among the eight different sizes of saxtubas that took part in Halévy's Le Juif errant.

The saxtuba is often mistaken for one of the larger members of Sax's saxhorn family. In 1908 W. L. Hubbard defined the term saxtuba thus:

The bass saxhorn; a brass bass wind instrument similar to the saxotromba, and one of the family of brass instruments invented by Adolphe Sax. It has three cylinders or pistons for regulating the pitch, a wide mouthpiece, and possesses a deep sonorous tone.

The saxtuba has no entry in The New Grove Dictionary of Music and Musicians, but the New Grove Dictionary of Musical Instruments describes it as "a brass instrument in the circular form of the Roman buccina," adding that it has "three valves and was made in seven sizes from piccolo in B♭ to contrabass in B♭."

== Acoustic principles of the saxtuba family ==
From the surviving copy of Halévy's opera, it would appear that the saxtubas were made in the same pitches as the saxhorns: indeed, it is quite probable that they were deliberately designed by Sax as substitutes for the saxhorns, music for which had already been composed. Berlioz claimed that the two deepest instruments (corresponding to the contrabass saxhorns listed above) did not exist, but this seems to be contradicted by both the surviving score and eyewitness accounts of Halévy's opera.

In his Treatise on Instrumentation Berlioz described nine different sizes of saxhorn. These correspond to those listed above with one addition: a small sopranino in C: Forsyth's Orchestration (1914) includes seven of these, though the nomenclature is quite different, as the following table shows:

Halévy - Aigue en Si♭ Soprano en Mi♭ Contre Alto en Si♭ Alto en Mi♭ Baryton en Si♭ Basse en Si♭ C:basse en Mi♭ C:basse en Si♭	Berlioz Suraigu en Ut Suraigu en Si♭ Soprano en Mi♭ Alto en Si♭ Tenor en Mi♭ Baritone en Si♭ Bass en Si♭ Contrabass en Mi♭ Bourdon en Si♭	Forsyth - - Sopranino in E♭ Soprano in B♭ Alto in E♭ Tenor in B♭ Bass in B♭ Bass in E♭ Contrabass in B♭	Modern Sopranino in C Sopranino in B♭ Soprano in E♭ Alto in B♭ Tenor in E♭ Baritone in B♭ Bass in B♭ Bass in E♭ Contrabass in B♭

Of these, only the bottom three were whole-tube instruments capable of sounding their fundamentals. The remaining instruments were half-tube instruments, whose series of natural harmonics only descended as far as the second harmonic. Some of the extant saxtubas have only three valves, while some have four.

Harmonic series of the saxtuba (written notes).

The whole-tube saxtubas require at least four valves for a fully chromatic range from the fundamental upwards, as the gap between the first and second harmonics is a full octave. Valves that lower the pitch of an open note by one, two, three and five semitones can be used alone or in combination to supply notes that lie between them, although the lower notes are sharp. Later models of saxtuba were built with Sax's unsuccessful system of six independent valves, changing the pitch of an open harmonic by one through six semitones and removing the need to use valves in combination.

== Compass ==
Like the saxhorn, the saxtuba was a transposing instrument. According to Berlioz, its music was always written in the treble clef as though for an instrument pitched in C, but the actual sounds produced depended on the size of instrument used. For example, if a piece of music were performed on Halévy's soprano saxtuba in E-flat, it would sound a minor third higher than written. Halévy's score of Le Juif errant is in general agreement with this, though, curiously, the part for the bass saxtuba in B♭ ("Sax horn basse en Si♭") is notated in the bass clef, sounding just one whole-tone lower than written.

In the following table, which follows Forsyth (1914), all eight saxtubas from Le Juif errant and the contrabass saxtuba in C from Massenet's Esclarmonde have been included with their probable ranges.

Name	Key	Fundamental	Transposition	Sounding Range
Sopranino	B♭		minor seventh higher	
Soprano	B♭		minor third higher	
Alto	E♭		major second lower	
Tenor	B♭		major sixth lower	
Baritone	E♭		major ninth lower	
Bass	B♭		major ninth lower	
Bass	E♭		major thirteenth lower	
Contrabass	C		two octaves lower	
Contrabass	B♭		octave plus a major ninth lower	

== Extant saxtubas ==
Of the saxtubas manufactured by Adolphe Sax's firm, about half a dozen have survived to the present day. The following table includes one instrument which was lost during World War II:

Year	Key	Valves	Location	Comments
1855	E♭	3 Berlin piston valves	Metropolitan Museum of Art, New York	
1855	B♭		Musikinstrumenten-Museum, Berlin	lost during World War II
1855	E♭	3 Berlin piston valves	Trompetenmuseum, Bad Säckingen	
1895–1907		4 valves	Musée de la Musique, Paris	pavillon pivotant
1895–1907			Musée de la Musique, Paris	Adolphe-Edouard Sax
c. 1900		4 piston valves	Musée de la Musique, Paris	Adolphe-Edouard Sax pavillon pivotant
c. 1900			Musée de la Musique, Paris	
1907–28		3 piston valves	Paris	Adolphe-Edouard Sax pavillon pivotant
c. 1900		4 piston valves	Musée de la Musique, Paris	Adolphe-Edouard Sax pavillon tournant

== See also ==
- Sousaphone
