= Charles-Joseph Sax =

Belgian musical instrument maker (1790-1865)

- Born: 1 February 1790; Dinant, Wallonia, Austrian Netherlands (now Belgium)
- Died: 26 April 1865 (aged 75); Paris, France
- Occupations: Inventor, musical instrument designer
- Known for: Father of Adolphe Sax
- Parent(s): Françoise Élisabeth (Maréchal) and Antoine Joseph Sax

Charles-Joseph Sax (1 February 1790 – 26 April 1865) was a Belgian musical instrument maker. His son was Adolphe Sax, who invented the saxophone, the saxhorn and the saxotromba.

Sax was the son of Françoise Élisabeth (Maréchal) and Antoine Joseph Sax. He was a maker of wind and brass instruments, as well as of pianos, harps, and guitars. Sax was a great instrument maker, and made sure his son had a good education and a leg to stand on for his future. He was a careful, strict, and kind father to his son, Adolphe Sax, and played a big part in his son's successful career.

Instruments built by Charles-Joseph are held in some museum collections.
