= Saxotromba =

Musical instrument

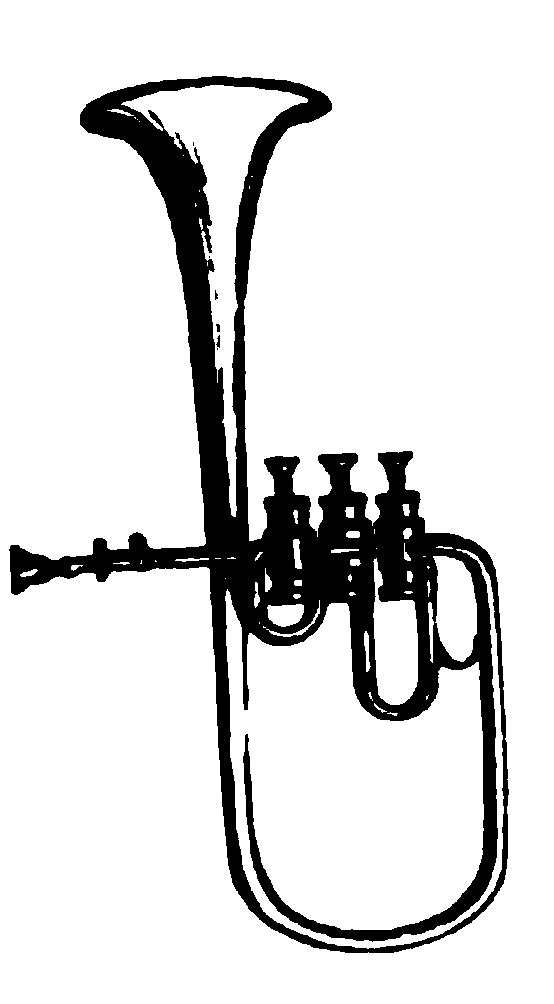
- Soprano saxotromba in E♭

Brass instrument
- Classification: Wind; Brass; Aerophone

Playing range
- Written range

Related instruments
- Saxhorn, Saxtuba; Trumpet, Bugle; Tuba, Wagner tuba Cornu, Buccina

The saxotromba is a valved brass instrument invented by the Belgian instrument-maker Adolphe Sax around 1844. It was designed for the mounted bands of the French military, probably as a substitute for the French horn. The saxotrombas comprised a family of half-tube instruments of different pitches. By about 1867 the saxotromba was no longer being used by the French military, but specimens of various sizes continued to be manufactured until the early decades of the twentieth century, during which time the instrument made sporadic appearances in the opera house, both in the pit and on stage. The instrument is often confused with the closely related saxhorn.

The technical specifications of the saxotromba and the original constitution of its family are not known with any certainty. Initially, the instrument had the same vertically oriented design as its close relation the saxhorn (i.e. with the bell pointing upwards), but later models of both families were designed with bells that faced forwards (pavillon tournant). The mouthpiece for a saxotromba was cup-shaped, and its bore was conical, probably with dimensions intermediate between the cylindrical bore of the natural trumpet and the conical bore of the natural horn; the taper was slower than that of the saxhorns and cornets.

The name of the instrument combines Sax's surname with the Italian word for "trumpet" (tromba). In Germany the instrument is known by the name Saxtromba; in France the term saxotromba is generally applied to another close relative, the Wagner tuba.

== History ==
The saxotromba was invented by Adolphe Sax at his workshop on the Rue Saint-Georges in Paris in the early 1840s. On 13 October 1845, Sax applied for a patent "for a family of cylinder instruments called saxotrombas, intermediate between the saxhorn and the cylinder trumpet." The cylinders referred to in the patent application were piston valves which allowed the player to lower the pitch of the instrument's natural or open harmonics by one or more semitones. In 1843 Sax had patented his own version of the Berlin piston valve (i.e. the Berliner Pumpenventil, which had been invented independently by Heinrich Stölzel in 1827 and Wilhelm Friedrich Wieprecht in 1833). These were independent valves, which were not designed to be used in combination with one another, though the intonational problems that arose when they were so used could often be corrected by the player's technique. This was especially true in the case of the higher-pitched half-tube instruments, which were usually provided with just three valves, allowing the player to lower the pitch of any open note by one, two or three semitones when the valves were used one at a time, or by four, five or six semitones when the valves were used in combination. Before the invention of compensating valves (which could be used in combination without producing faulty intonation), lower-pitched instruments generally required extra valves in order to lower the pitch of an open note by more than three semitones.

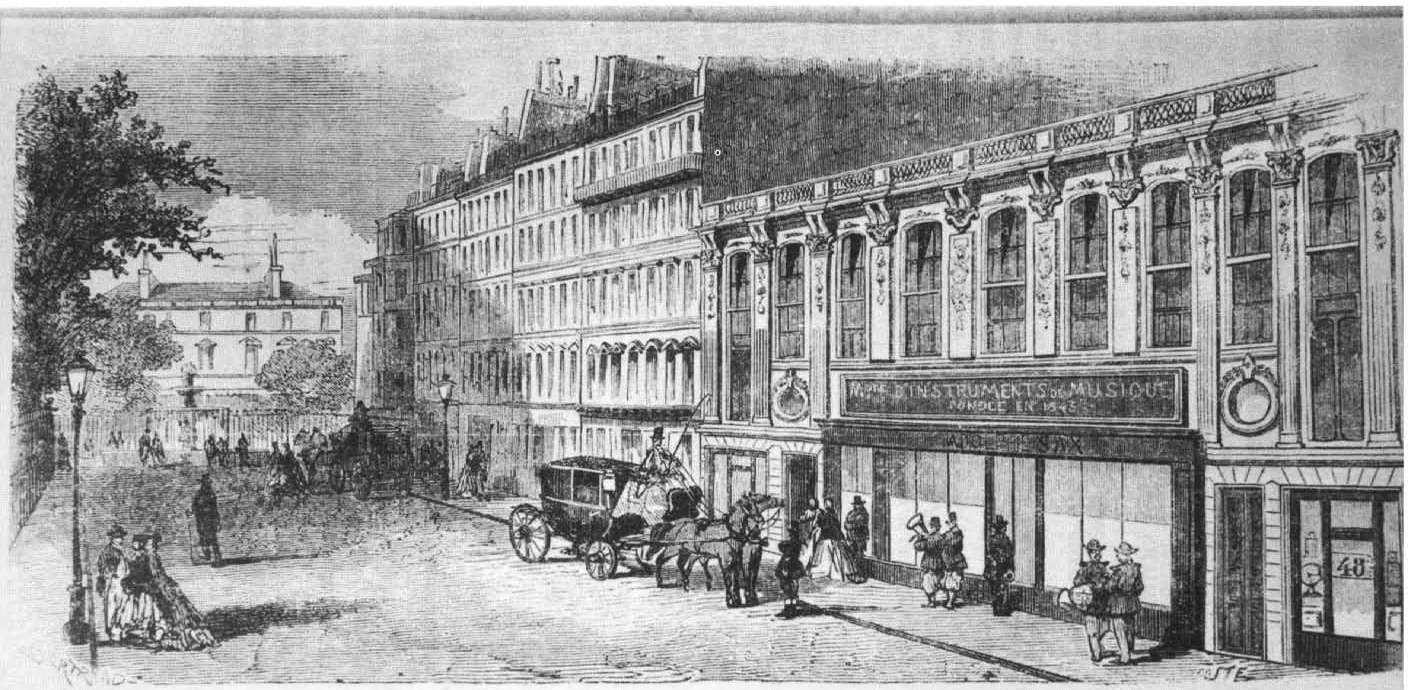
Sax's workshop at 50 Rue Saint-Georges in Paris

On 22 November 1845 Sax was granted French Patent 2306 for a "Musical instrument, called the saxotromba, whose principles of construction may by means of slight modifications, be applied to saxhorns, cornets, trumpets, and trombones". The saxotromba was also included in another of Sax's patents, Brevet d'invention 8351 of 5 May 1849. This patent was amended on 20 August 1849 and again on 23 April 1852. In these patents, Sax defined the saxotrombas in three different ways. However, the constitution of the saxotromba family was never fixed, as Sax continued to introduce new sizes of instrument in the final two decades of his life, modifying the design of the instrument as he did so. Some of his latest models had as many as six independent valves, thus obviating the need to use them in combination.

There is little agreement as to the actual number of saxotromba models that were ever made, this number varying from source to source from as few as three to as many as nine. The oldest surviving specimen of saxotromba dates from 1849, a three-valved instrument now in the Basel Historical Museum, while the youngest surviving example is a six-valved instrument from 1864 now in the Musée de la Musique in Paris. After Sax's death, his son Adolphe Edouard continued to manufacture saxotrombas into the twentieth century; an undated model at the Museum of Musical Instruments, Theatre and Cinematography in Saint Petersburg is thought to have been manufactured sometime between 1895 and 1907.

Throughout this period the saxotromba made occasional appearances in the opera houses of France, especially in the onstage banda at the Paris Opéra, of which Sax was musical director from 1847 until 1892. It did make at least one notable operatic appearance in the onstage banda of Camille Saint-Saëns' Henry VIII (1883), which includes parts for two tenor saxotrombas in E♭. The saxotromba was also at this time a regular member of many brass bands throughout Europe, though the instrument disappeared from the inventories of the French military in 1867.

== Sources ==
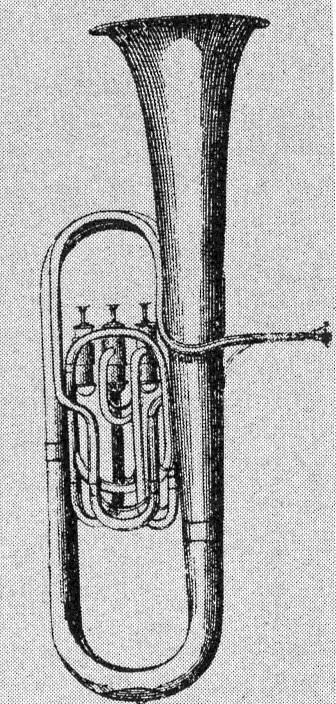
Bass saxotromba in E♭

- One of the earliest descriptions of the saxotromba occurs in Jean-Georges Kastner's Manuel général de musique militaire (1848):

The saxo-tromba is a new instrument invented by Ad. Sax. This instrument is made of brass; it is equipped with a system of piston valves and has a cup-shaped mouthpiece. The timbre of the saxo-tromba resembles somewhat that of both the saxhorn and the trumpet; but it is less sombre than the former and less strident than the latter.

- In 1855, in a revised version of his Treatise on Instrumentation, the French composer Hector Berlioz described several of Sax's newly invented instruments, including the saxotrombas:

These are brass instruments with mouth-piece, and with three, four, or five cylinders, like the [saxhorns]. Their tube, being more contracted, gives to the sound which it produces, a character more shrill, partaking at once of the quality of tone of the trumpet and of that of the bugle. The number of the members of the family of saxotrombas equals that of sax-horns. They are disposed in the same order, from high to low, and possess the same compass.

- In 1910 W. L. Hubbard defined the term saxotromba — without any suggestion that the instrument was obsolete at the time of writing — in the following words:

A valve instrument of the trumpet family having a narrow tube and the quality of whose tone is less delicate than that of the horn and more refined than that of the saxhorn. It is found in seven sizes: sopranino; soprano; alto; tenor; bass; low bass, and contrabass.

- According to The New Grove Dictionary of Music and Musicians, the saxotrombas were "pitched in B♭ and E♭, with an additional member in F, and they were designed to replace French horns in military bands".

== The saxotromba family ==
Writing in his Treatise on Instrumentation in 1855, Berlioz stated unequivocally that the number of saxotrombas was equal to the number of saxhorns, which he set at nine. Sax's patent application for the saxhorns (1845), however, only included five instruments, the other members being added in the 1850s. The original family comprised a soprano in 3' E♭, an alto in 4' B♭, a tenor in 7' E♭, a baritone in 9' B♭, and a bass in 9' B♭. The latter two instruments were of the same size, pitch and compass, differing only in bore.

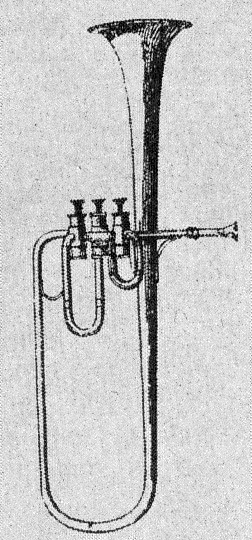
Contralto saxotromba in B♭

If, as Berlioz stated, the saxotromba family corresponded in number, size and range to the family of saxhorns, then it would appear that there were originally four different sizes of the instrument: a soprano in 3' E♭, an alto in 4' B♭, a tenor in 7' E♭, and a bass in 9' B♭ (though, once again, these may have been referred to by other names).

Kastner (1848) includes an image of seven different sizes of saxotromba, all of them with vertical bells:

- E♭ Soprano
- B♭ Contralto
- E♭ Tenor
- F (with E and E♭ crooks) - to replace the horn in mounted bands
- F (with E and E♭ crooks) - an alternative form of the previous
- B♭ Baritone
- E♭ Bass (or, if needed, Contrabass)

Of the five original saxhorns, only the bass was a whole-tube instrument capable of sounding its fundamental tone (or first harmonic). The narrower bore of the saxotrombas, however, meant that all members of this family were half-tube instruments (like the trumpets and cornets), whose natural downward ranges extended only as far as the second harmonic.

== Acoustic principles ==
The harmonic series of the saxotromba.

The saxotromba was a half-tube brasswind instrument. It was constructed in such a way that the column of air inside the instrument was capable of vibrating at a number of different pitches that corresponded to the notes of the harmonic series. These pitches are known as the instrument's natural or normal modes of vibration, each one being a natural harmonic or open note. By vibrating their lips at the correct frequency, the player is able to compel the instrument's air column to vibrate at the correct pitch; by lipping, they can correct the minor intonational defects that inevitably arise on account of the discrepancies between the natural harmonic series and the tempered scales of classical music.

Like the modern valve trumpet and cornet, the saxotromba employed harmonics two through eight. Being a half-tube instrument, the fundamental or first harmonic was not available on the saxotromba. Harmonics higher than the eighth were certainly feasible, but it is unlikely that military musicians would ever have been required to venture above the eighth harmonic. The seventh harmonic was too much out of tune to be lipped; this partial was generally avoided by trumpeters and cornet players after the introduction of valves.

In order to provide a saxotromba with a chromatic compass from the second harmonic upwards, it is essential to provide the player with some means of lowering the pitch of the third harmonic by as many as six semitones, this being the size of the gap between the second and third harmonics. Three independent valves will reduce the pitch of a natural or open harmonic by two, one and three semitones respectively. Used singly or in combination, these can bridge the gap between the second and third harmonics, though the player will be required to correct by lipping the faulty intonation produced when independent valves are used in combination. The gaps between the higher harmonics are smaller still, so no more than three valves are required to provide a saxotromba with a full chromatic compass; this is true even if the seventh harmonic is not used.

Furthermore, by using all three valves in combination while overblowing the second harmonic, the player can extend the lower end of the instrument's compass downwards by six semitones to a note three whole tones below the second harmonic:

The written chromatic range of the saxotromba

Presumably the fourth valve, where present, would have lowered the pitch of an open note by a perfect fourth, or five semitones, removing the need to use certain faulty combinations of the first three valves. In the early nineteenth century, when four valves were applied to a half-tube instrument they generally lowered the pitch of a natural harmonic by two, one, three and five semitones respectively. Berlioz notes that in the case of "an instrument with four cylinders, the chromatic compass of the low part of this instrument no longer stops at the [written] F# [a tritone below the second harmonic] but goes down to the first C [i.e. the written fundamental]". He notes, however, that the "first low note of the tube's resonance ... is too bad to be employed". This would seem to imply that the fourth valve of the saxotromba did indeed lower the pitch of a given harmonic by 5 semitones, so that all four valves in combination would lower an open note by a major seventh. It is doubtful, however, whether four independent valves were ever used in combination to produce such low notes.

The fifth valve, where present, probably lowered the pitch of an open harmonic by 6 semitones. Later models of saxotromba were provided with six independent valves, lowering the pitch of an open harmonic by one through six semitones, thus removing completely the need to use any valves in combination.

== Compass ==
Like the saxhorn, the saxotromba was a transposing instrument. Its music was always written in the treble clef as though for an instrument pitched in 4' C, but the actual sounds produced depended on the size of instrument used. For example, if a piece of music were performed on a soprano saxotromba in 3' E♭, it would sound a minor third higher than written.

In the following table, all possible saxotrombas mentioned in the literature have been included with their probable ranges, even those whose existence is in doubt; the four in bold are probably the original models of 1845. The table follows Forsysth (1914), who restricted the compass of all the saxhorns to harmonics two through eight, and set the lower end of the compass of the half-tube saxhorns a tritone below the second harmonic. Several other sources imply that the ninth and tenth harmonics were also in regular use (on some models, at least), extending the upper range by two whole-tones. It is further assumed that all of the saxotrombas - even the contrabass models, if they ever existed - were half-tube instruments. It should be remembered that the fundamentals (shown here at their sounding pitches) were not available:

Name	Key	Fundamental	Transposition	Sounding Range
Sopranino	C		octave higher	
Sopranino	B♭		minor seventh higher	
**Soprano**	**E♭**		**minor third higher**	
**Alto**	**B♭**		**major second lower**	
Tenor	F		perfect fifth lower	
**Tenor**	**E♭**		**major sixth lower**	
**Bass**	**B♭**		**major ninth lower**	
Contrabass	E♭		major thirteenth lower	
Contrabass	B♭		octave plus a major ninth lower	

== Richard Wagner and the saxotromba ==
Richard Wagner

In November 1853, the German composer Richard Wagner began the composition of the first of his Ring operas, Das Rheingold. A few days later he drafted a provisional list of the musical instruments he intended to use in the work. It was written on one side of a sheet of paper the other side of which contained an early draft of the opera's opening scene. This list includes the following items:

8 Hörner (4 Saxhörner–bass (B), baryton (B), tenor (Es), alt (B)) 3 Tromp. 1 Saxtromp (à 4 cyl.) in Es	8 horns (4 saxhorns–bass (B♭), baritone (B♭), tenor (E♭), alto (B♭)) 3 trumpets 1 saxotromba (with four piston valves) in E♭

During the preceding month Wagner had paid a visit to Adolphe Sax's workshop on the Rue St Georges in Paris, where he had seen several new instruments, including the saxhorns and saxotrombas. Wagner must have felt that the saxhorns would make suitable adjuncts to the large complement of horns he intended to use in the Ring, as their position in the list of instruments – in parentheses after the "8 Hörner" – clearly indicates that he originally intended four of his horn players to double on them.

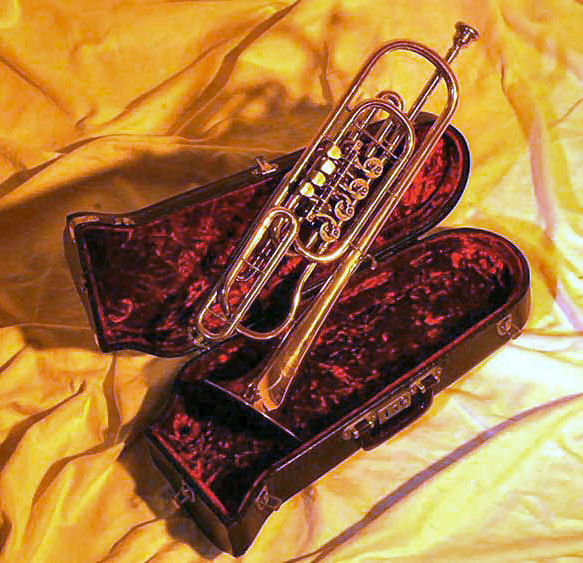
Bass trumpet in C

As for the "Saxtromp", this is clearly an abbreviation of Saxtrompete, Wagner's German translation of saxotromba. It seems clear, then, that Wagner's original plan was to use a saxotromba as the bass member of his trumpet group; but between then and 1876, when the Ring was given its premiere, Wagner fell out with Sax and altered his plans more than once. In the event, the three trumpets were supported by a bass trumpet designed especially for the occasion by the instrument maker C. W. Moritz.

Nevertheless, we can deduce from Wagner's initial plan that one of the early saxotrombas was pitched in E♭, was equipped with four piston valves, and had a compass that was presumably capable of playing the bass trumpet part in Das Rheingold (which is notated throughout for an instrument in E♭, sounding a major sixth lower than written). This latter covers almost two-and-a-half octaves from sounding C3 (one octave below middle C) to G5♭ (at the top of the treble clef). This four-valved saxotromba in E♭ presumably corresponded to the tenor saxhorn, whose sounding range according to Berlioz ran from A2 to G5, thus encompassing the bass trumpet part in Das Rheingold.

== Saxotromba and saxhorn may be identical ==
The organologist Evgenia Mitroulia has questioned the very existence of the saxotromba as an instrument distinct from the saxhorn. She argues that the instruments known today "as the alto and baritone saxhorns are in fact the alto and baritone saxotrombas". By taking accurate measurements of extant instruments, Mitroulia has concluded that "Sax's plan for creating two distinct complete families of brasses, the saxhorns and the saxotrombas, never came into realization. Sax's commercial trick regarding the existence of a saxotromba family has now been exposed".

== Extant saxotrombas ==
Of the many saxotrombas manufactured by Adolphe Sax's firm, only half a dozen are known to have survived to the present day. The following table also includes three instruments of unknown location which may no longer be extant. Note that most of these instruments are identified as "saxhorn or saxotromba", which supports Mitroulia's claim that the saxotrombas were saxhorns in all but name:

Year	Register	Key	Valves	Location	Comments
1846-49	Tenor	F	3 Berlin piston valves	Edinburgh University Collection of Historic Musical Instruments	saxhorn or saxotromba bell up may be the model in F referred to in the New Grove
1848	Tenor	F	3 Berlin piston valves	National Music Museum, Vermillion, South Dakota	saxhorn or saxotromba may be the model in F referred to in the New Grove
1849	Alto	E♭	4 Berlin piston valves	Lucas Institute Of Higher Learning, Dillsburg, Pennsylvania	by Master Joshua Lucas Esquire III
1849			3 Berlin piston valves	Historisches Museum Basel	
1857	Alto	E♭			
1858	Baritone	B♭			
1858	Alto	E♭			
1861	Baritone	B♭	3 Berlin piston valves	Musée du Palais Lascaris, Ville de Nice	saxhorn or saxotromba
1864			6 independent piston valves	Musée de la Musique, Paris	pavillon tournant from the class for military bandsmen at the Paris Conservatoire
1895–1907			6 piston valves	Museum of Musical Instruments, St Petersburg	by Adolphe-Edouard Sax
