= Treatise on Instrumentation =

Book by Hector Berlioz

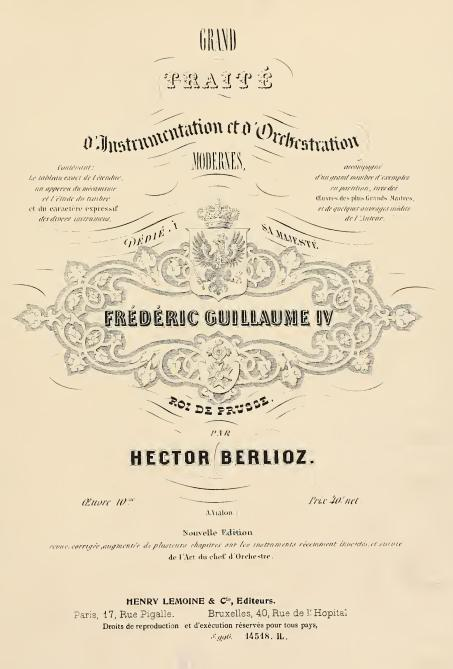
Treatise on Instrumentation

Grand traité d’instrumentation et d’orchestration modernes, abbreviated in English as the Treatise on Instrumentation (sometimes Treatise on Orchestration) is a technical study of Western musical instruments written by Hector Berlioz. It was first published in 1844 after being serialised in many parts prior to this date and had a chapter added by Berlioz on conducting in 1855.

In 1904, Richard Strauss was asked to update the text to include some modern instruments and added musical examples from Wagner, and in 1905 the updated Treatise with a new preface by Strauss was published in German. The 1905 edition was translated into English in 1948.

The book discusses the various technical aspects of instruments, such as chromatic range, tone quality, and limitations. An explanation of the role of particular instruments within the orchestra is also provided. The book also provides orchestral excerpts from classical scores to give examples of techniques discussed. These examples are sometimes of works by Berlioz himself, while Mozart, Wagner, Beethoven, and Gluck are also frequently cited.

Many composers studied the work closely, such as Modest Mussorgsky, Gustav Mahler, Richard Strauss, and Nikolai Rimsky-Korsakov.

== Instruments discussed ==
The following musical instruments are discussed in the Treatise.

Strings:

- Violin
- Viola
- Viola d'amore
- Viola da gamba
- Cello
- Double bass

Plucked strings:

- Harp
- Guitar
- Mandolin

Keyboards:

- Piano
- Organ

Wind instruments:

- Oboe
- Oboe d'amore
- English horn
- Bassoon
- Tenoroon (Bassoon Quinte)
- Clarinets (including Alto and Bass clarinets)
- Basset-horn
- Flute (alto flute)
- Piccolo
- Serpent
- Russian bassoon

Brass instruments:

- French horn
- Valve horn
- Trumpet
- Cornet
- Trombones
- Tubas (bass tuba)
- Bugle
- Keyed bugle
- Valve bugle
- Ophicleide (Bass, Alto, Double-Bass)
- Bombardon

Voices: (Soprano, Alto, Tenor, Bass etc.)

Percussion:

- Timpani (Kettle drums)
- Bells
- Glockenspiel
- Glass harmonica
- Ancient cymbals
- Bass drum
- Gong
- Tambourine
- Side drum
- Tenor drum
- Triangle
- Crescent

New instruments:

- Saxophones
- Saxhorn
- Saxotrombas
- Saxtubas
- Concertina
- Melodium organ
- Octobass
- Pianos and Melodiums with prolonged sounds

== Other topics discussed ==
The orchestra: An overview of how the orchestra functions as a whole and its development throughout history.

On conducting: A brief discussion of conducting practices in Europe during Berlioz's day. Berlioz was also known as a great conductor in his time, in addition to a composer.
