= Distin family =

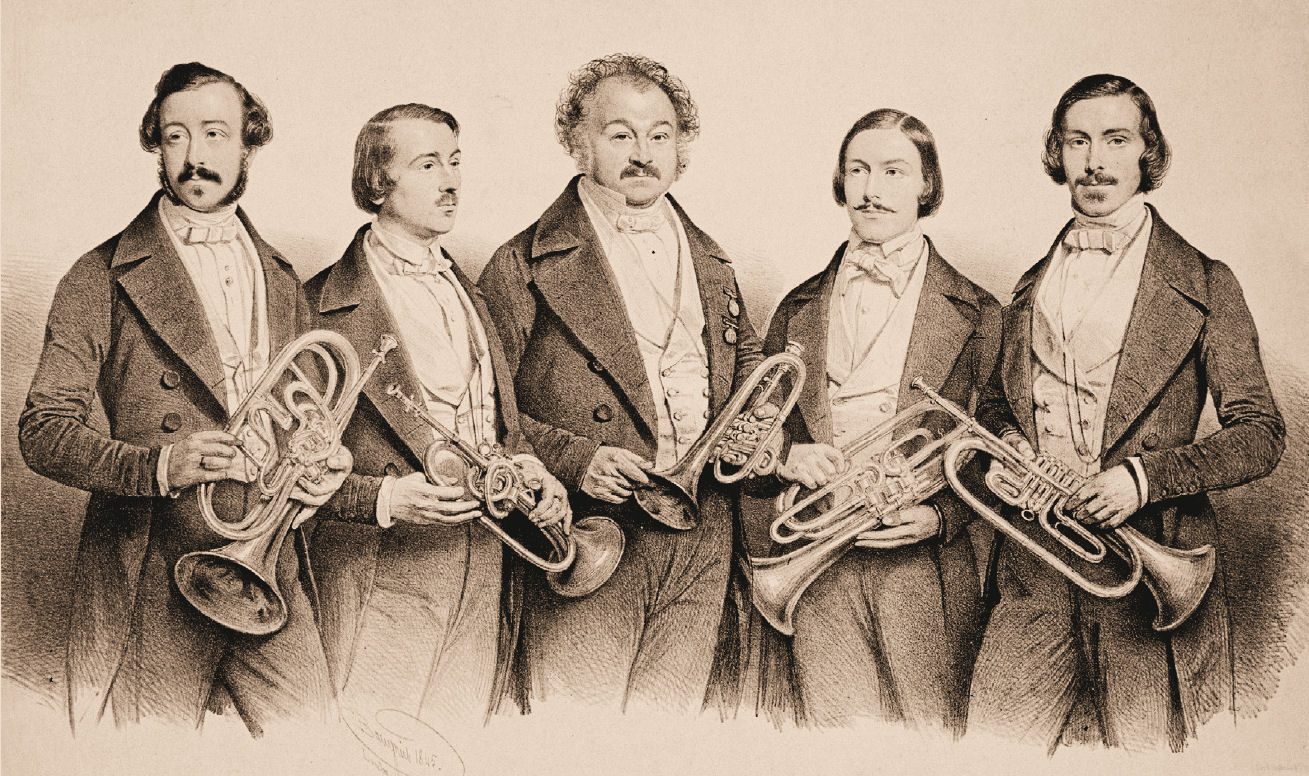
The Distin Quintet in France, 1845

The Distin family was an ensemble of British musicians in the 19th century who performed on brass instruments, and from 1845 promoted the saxhorn. One of them, Henry Distin, later became a noted brass instrument manufacturer in the United Kingdom and United States.

== John Distin, early career ==
John Distin (1798–1863) was born in Plympton, and began his musical career with the South Devon Militia, and from 1814 in the Grenadier Guards. He was known as a soloist in his early teens: the melodrama The Miller and his Men by Henry Bishop, which contained a trumpet obbligato based on Distin's style, dates from 1813. In the Guards, he was taken to be a virtuoso of the keyed bugle, and came to notice in Paris after the battle of Waterloo. The development by Halary of the ophicleides is put down to a request from Grand Duke Konstantin Pavlovich of Russia, who had there heard Distin play the keyed bugle for the Grenadier Guards.

Distin in 1821 joined the band of George IV, in which he played the slide trumpet as well as the keyed bugle. On the king's death in 1830, the band was dissolved, and he spent a number of years in Scotland, at Taymouth as bandmaster to John Campbell, 1st Marquess of Breadalbane, then formed a brass quintet with his four sons.

== The Distin family brass quintet ==
The debut of the Distin family quintet took place in 1837, at the Adelphi Theatre, Edinburgh. The initial instrumentation was John Distin on slide trumpet, and his four teenage sons on three horns and a trombone. John and his four sons then toured internationally as a brass ensemble, into the late 1840s. Their repertoire included a fantasia on the opera Robert le diable by Meyerbeer.

The brass instruments used by the early Quintet were from the Pace family of instrument makers, founded in 18th-century Dublin by Matthew Pace. The players combined the keyed bugle, natural horns, slide trumpet, trombone and cornopean (i.e. cornet).

== Ann Matilda Distin ==
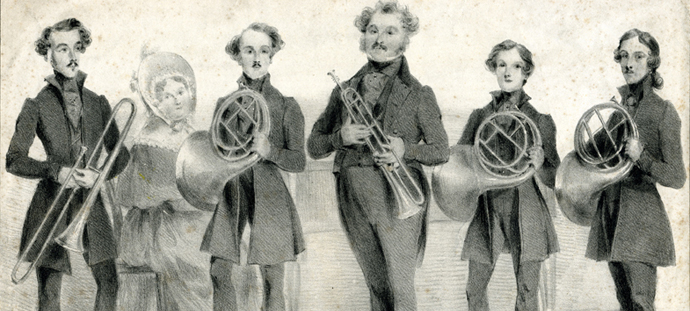
The Distin Quintet, 1830s lithograph with Ann Matilda Distin at the piano

Ann Matilda Distin (née Loder) (1786–1848) in 1829 married John Distin as her second husband. She had previously been married to Thomas Edmund Ridgway (1780–1829).

Ann Matilda was from a noted family of musicians in Bath, Somerset, the elder sister of John David Loder. She went onto the stage, mostly as dancer, in Bristol and Bath in 1803, and married Ridgway in 1804; this marriage had broken down soon after 1815.

Ridgway had a career in pantomime, first appearing as Harlequin in 1807, with Joseph Grimaldi. By 1813 it could be said of pantomime at Sadler's Wells that "its chief asset was the talent of Tom Ridgway and John Bologna, its Harlequins, James Barnes, its Pantaloon, and Grimaldi [...]"

Ann Matilda composed the Windsor Quadrilles for Elizabeth Conyngham, Marchioness Conyngham. She was mother, by her first marriage, to the Ridgway family of pantomime artists. At London's Olympic Theatre, the Christmas pantomimes "were supported by the Ridgway family, and proved very attractive" in the 1820s. She had a second family of performers, her four sons by Distin who were the supporting players in the Quintet, all of them born out of wedlock. She herself became the pianist accompanying the Distin Quintet.

== New instruments ==
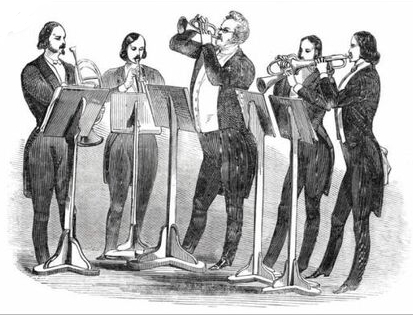
Distin family playing saxhorns, 1844 engraving

Adolph Sax introduced his saxhorns in 1844, and that year the Distin family encountered him in Paris, and adopted the new range of brass instruments. This was a fundamental change to valved brass, from keyed and slide mechanisms. The Distins influenced the further evolution of brass instruments.

In January 1845 the Distins performed on silver saxhorns for Queen Victoria and Albert, Prince Consort at Stowe House. That year, John Distin and his second son Henry set up a business, Distin & Sons, in London, dealing in sheet music and musical instruments. The instrument business also stocked saxhorns; and the quintet publicised the saxhorn range. In that same year, 1845, the first ever brass band competition formally organised took place at Burton Constable, as part of a celebration run by Thomas Clifford-Constable, with instruments supplied by the Distins.

The eldest of the sons, George (born 1818), died in 1848, and the touring group then became a quartet. His mother also died the same year. The family business Distin & Sons was then dissolved.

The Distin brass quartet accepted a 40 concert booking in New York for the 1849 season, but the venue burned to the ground while they were crossing the Atlantic. While the tour was critically hailed, a cholera epidemic and riots scared away audiences. A brief tour of Canada went no better.

== Distin & Co. of London ==
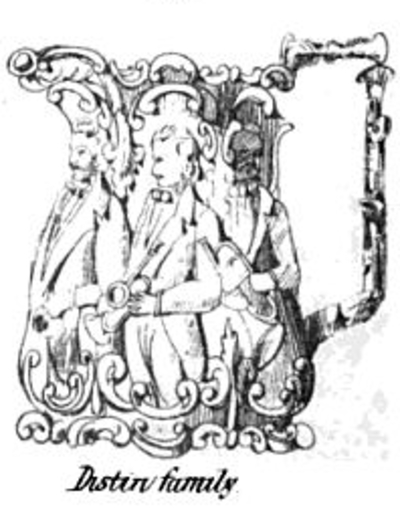
Cork & Edge Distin family memorabilia, jug in the catalogue of the Exposition Universelle (1855)

Some time after the American tour of 1849, Henry John Distin (1819–1903), the second son of John and Ann Matilda. established his own instrument manufacturing and sales concern, Distin & Co., in London. He sold Adolph Sax's instruments alongside his own traditional brass instruments. He was awarded a prize medal for the superiority of his instruments over European competitors at the Paris Exposition Universelle of 1867.

Henry Distin then in 1868 sold Distin & Co., including its shop on Cranbourn Street, to what would become the Boosey family business, precursor of Boosey & Hawkes formed in 1930. Originally a bookshop from the 1790s, Boosey by the mid-19th century was using specialist wind instrument makers. The acquisition of Distin's business positioned Boosey to become a leading brass and band instrument company. The original company name was retained to 1874; the works manager David Jamed Blaikley (1846–1936) was an innovator in instrument design.

== Later life of Henry Distin ==
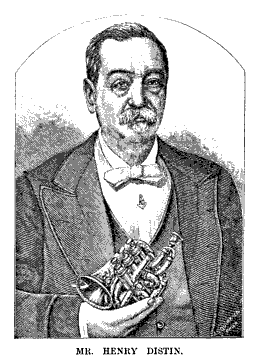
Henry Distin

Henry Distin subsequently lost most of his money on concert schemes and other ventures, within a few years.

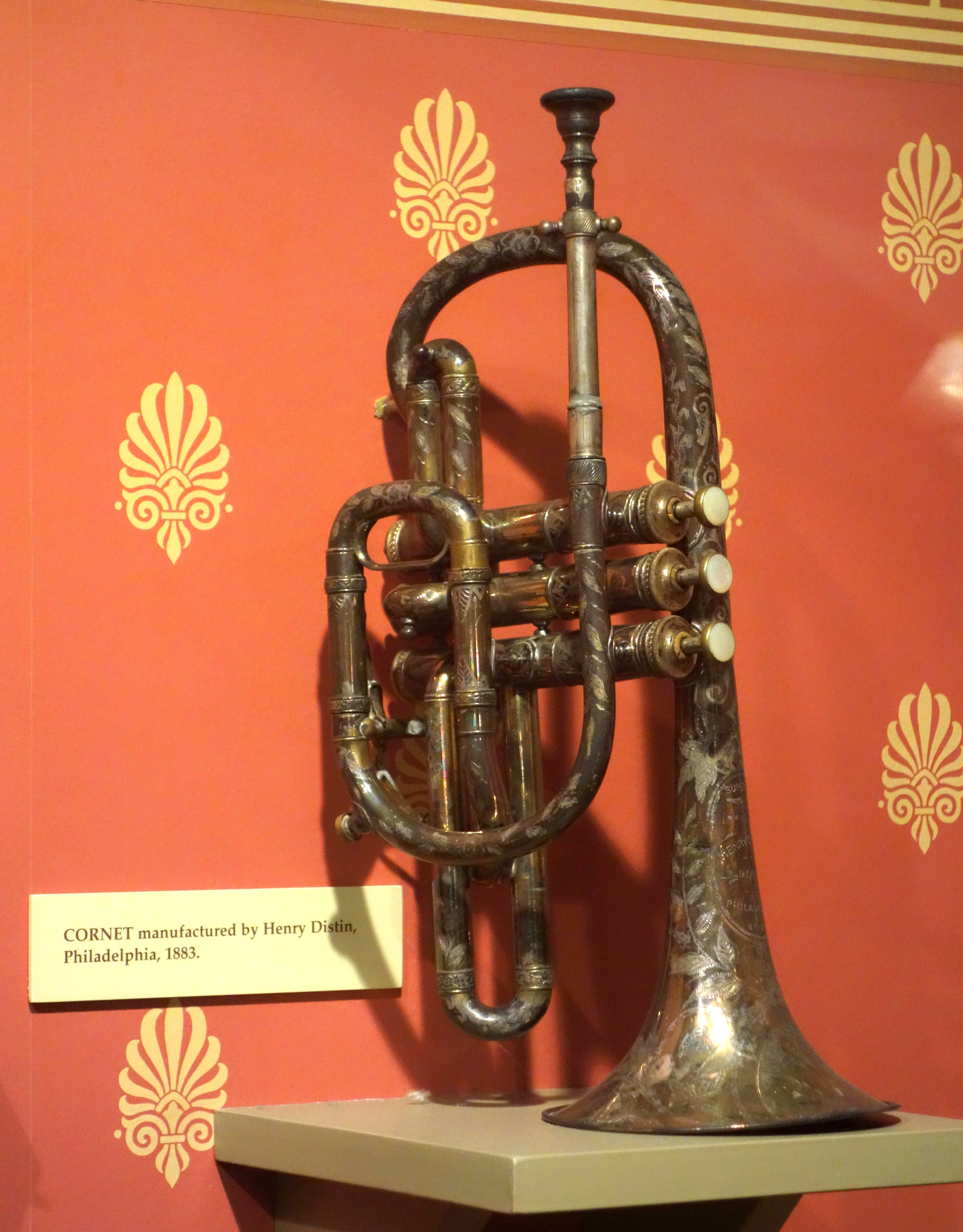
Cornet made by Henry Distin, Philadelphia, 1883

In 1876 Distin moved to the United States and set up a small business manufacturing cornets in New York. In 1882 he relocated to Williamsport, Pennsylvania, to produce instruments in partnership. The company took on his name in 1885, becoming the Henry Distin Manufacturing Company, and making a full line of brass instruments.

Distin remained a performer and marketer of brass instruments. At the age of 70, he was still performing, playing The Last Rose of Summer on an E-flat tuba with the Gilmore Band in 1889, at the concert for the purpose of presenting one of his company's horns to Patrick Gilmore. He died in Philadelphia, in 1903.
