= Claude Pascal =

French composer (1921–2017)

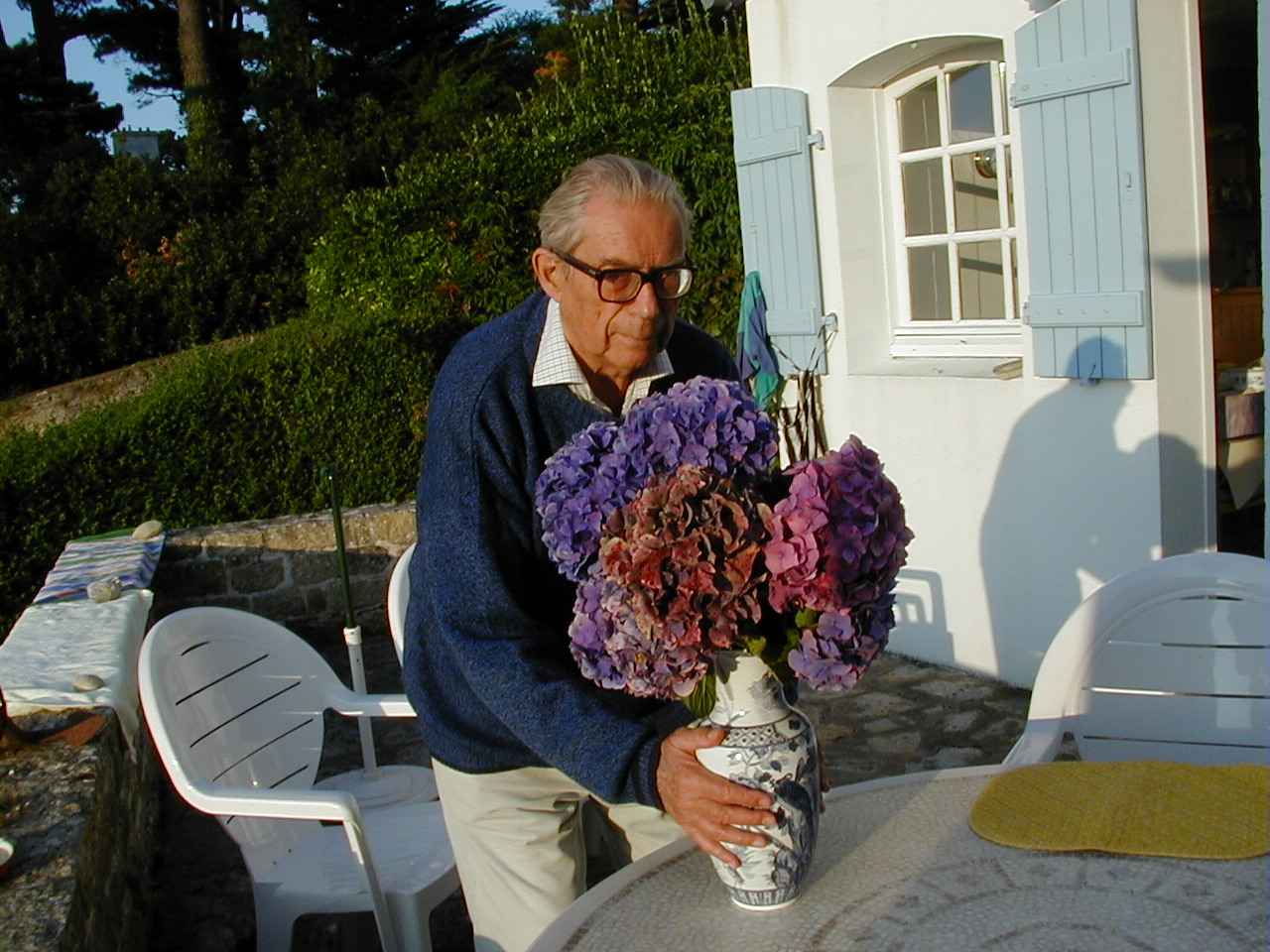
Pascal (2002)

Claude Pascal (Paris, February 19, 1921 – Paris, February 28, 2017) was a French composer.

After studying at the Conservatoire de Paris, he obtained the 1945 Premier Prix de Rome for the cantata, La farce du contre Bandier. After a brief period as conductor of the Opéra-Comique, Pascal became professor at the Paris Conservatoire in 1952, a position he held until his retirement in 1987. From 1969 to 1979 he worked as a music critic for Le Figaro, and from 1983 to 1991 he was an expert on copyright issues at the Paris Court of Appeals.

Pascal's extensive work as a composer includes practically every musical genre. The discography of his works consists of more than thirty CDs. The musical estate of Claude Pascal is archived at the Bibliothèque Nationale de France.

== Works ==
- Quatuor à cordes, 1943
- Octuor for wind instruments, 1944
- Sonatine for alto saxophone and piano, 1947
- 1ère Sonate for violin and piano, 1947
- Air varié for contrabass and piano, 1950
- Pop-corn for violin and piano, 1951
- Toccata for piano, 1952
- Pastorale héroïque for trombone and piano, 1952
- Pièce for oboe and piano, 1952
- Sonatine for violin and piano, 1952
- Impromptu for alto saxophone and piano, 1953
- Improvisation en forme de canon for trombone and piano, 1958
- Concerto for piano and chamber orchestra, 1958
- Concerto for cello and orchestra, 1959
- Musique pour harpe, 1960
- Quatuor de saxophones, 1961
- Ouverture pour un conte de fées for orchestra, 1961
- 2ème Sonate for violin and piano, 1963
- Ut ou do, 5 pieces for children's choir, 1963
- Sonate for horn and piano, 1963
- Trois Légendes for clarinet and piano, 1963
- Six Pièces variées for flute and piano, 1965
- Six Pièces variées for clarinet and piano, 1965
- Six Pièces variées for trumpet and piano, 1965
- Sonate en 6 minutes 30 for tuba, bass trombone, or saxhorn and piano, 1966
- Grave et Presto for cello and piano, 1966
- Concerto for harp and orchestra, 1967
- Orchestration of The art of fugue by Johann Sebastian Bach (with Marcel Bitsch), 1967
- Suite for piano, 1970
- Sonate for cello and piano, 1971
- Quatre Etudes for piano, 1980
- Triptyque ferroviaire, 3 pieces for two-part children's choir, 1980
- L'Invitation aux voyages, 5 pieces for three-part choir, 1981
- Portrait de l'oiseau-qui-n'existe-pas, song for soprano and piano, 1981
- Sonatine for piano, 1982
- Suite française for cello solo, 1982
- J'ai voulu te rejoindre, song for soprano and piano, 1982
- Elégie for organ, 1986
- Danse des Lutins for flute and piano, 1986
- Offertoire for organ, 1986
- Carnet de notes, 74 progressive pieces for piano, 1987
- Sonate for violin solo, 1990
- 60 Petites Etudes for piano, 1991
- Trois Inventions for flute quartet, 1991
- Framboise et Amandine, les jumelles de l'espace, comic opera for children, 1992
- Piano-rétro, 8 pieces for piano, 1992
- Farfelettes, 10 pieces for children's choir and one or two instruments, 1993
- Paraphrase sur "The Entertainer" by Scott Joplin for clarinet or alto saxophone and piano, 1994
- Quatre Farfelettes for voice and piano, 1998
- Sonate for horn solo, 1997
- Trio for soprano or tenor flutes, 1997
- Concerto for flute and string orchestra, 1996
- Trois Etudes-Caprices for piano four-hands, 1998
- Partita for alto saxophone and piano, 1999
- Scherzetto for saxophone quartet, 2002
- Sonate for two flutes, 2002
- Suite chorégraphique, 5 pieces for saxophone quartet, 2003
- Top-Model et Cie, 3 songs for soprano and piano, 2003
- Eléments de solfège, 4 songs for voice and piano, 2003
- Allegro, Choral et Fugato for horn quartet, 2004
- Equinoxe for horn and piano, 2004
- Notturno for violin and piano, 2005
- Rituel tibétain for horn quartet, 2005
- Sérénade for guitar, 2005
- Concerto for alto saxophone and orchestra, 2006
- Déjà 1 an !, song for voice and piano, 2006
- Atout Chœur, 5 pieces for mixed choir and organ or piano, 2007
- Entrée pour un mariage, Paraphrase of the Wedding March by Felix Mendelssohn for flute and organ, 2007

== Bibliography ==
- "Claude Pascal", in Sax, Mule & Co, Jean-Pierre Thiollet, H & D, 2004, p. 159-160. ISBN 2 914 266 03 0
