= Édith Lejet =

French composer and music educator (1941–2024)

Edith Lejet
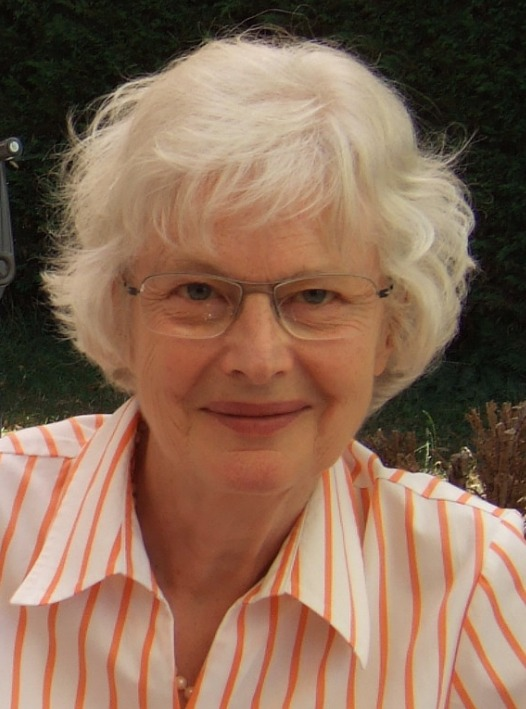

Background information
- Born: 19 July 1941 Paris, German-occupied France
- Died: 15 July 2024 (aged 82)
- Genres: Contemporary music
- Occupation(s): Composer, music educator
- Website: http://www.edith-lejet.com/english/home.php

Édith Lejet (19 July 1941 – 15 July 2024) was a French composer and music educator.

== Biography ==
Born in Paris, Lejet was the youngest of three children in a family with an engineer father. Lejet studied with Marcel Beaufils (aesthetics), Henri Challan (harmony), Marcel Bitsch (counterpoint and fugue), Jean Rivier and Andre Jolivet (composition) at the Paris Conservatory. She was in residence at the Casa de Velázquez in Madrid from 1968 to 1970.

Lejet taught harmony at the Sorbonne from 1970 to 1972, and subsequently became professor at the National Conservatory of Music and Dance in Paris. In 2004, Lejet was appointed professor of composition at the École Normale de Musique de Paris Alfred Cortot.

Lejet died on 15 July 2024, at the age of 82.

== Honours ==
- Prize Bleustein-Blanchet in 1967 of Vocation
- Florence Gould Prize (Academy of Fine Arts, Paris)
- William and Nomma Copley Foundation Award (Chicago)
- Prize Herve Dugardin (SACEM, Paris)
- Second Grand Prix de Rome in 1968
- Music Awards Board of SACEM in 1979.
- Honorary Professor at the National Conservatory of Music and Dance in Paris (Cité de la Musique)
- Professor of composition at the Ecole Normale de Musique Alfred Cortot in Paris
- Nadia and Lili Boulanger Prize (Academy of Fine Arts, Paris) in 2003

== Works ==
=== Solo instrument ===
- Cinq pièces brèves, for piano (1965), unpublished, 7’
- Trois eaux-fortes, for piano (1990–1992), Amphion, 10’
- Fleurs d’opale, for piano (1997), Lemoine, 6’
- Triptyque, for organ (1979), Lemoine, 18’
- Ave Maria, for organ (1988), J.M. Fuzeau, 3'21
- Métamorphoses, for harp (1981), Transatlantiques, 4’
- De lumière et de cieux embrasés, for harp (2010), Lemoine, 5’
- Deux soliloques, for horn (1991), Amphion, 6’
- Volubilis, for cello (1981), Amphion, 7’
- La Houle à l'assaut des récifs, for cello (2010), Lemoine, 6’
- Palette, for percussion (1973), Heugel, 3’
- Gémeaux (Trois Figures du Zodiaque no. 1), for guitar (1978), Amphion, 5’30
- Contrastes et couleurs, for guitar (1983), Transatlantiques, 2’45
- Lion (Trois Figures du Zodiaque, no. 2), for guitar (1991), Max Eschig, 3’30
- Balance (Trois Figures du Zodiaque, no. 3), for guitar (1982), Transatlantiques, 6’
- America, for guitar (1987), unpublished, 5’30
- La Voix des voiles, for guitar (1989), Max Eschig, 4’

=== Two instruments ===
- Musique pour trombone et piano (1972), Billaudot, 5’
- Quatre pièces en duo, for double bass and piano (1975), Alphonse Leduc, 5’
- Méandres, for saxhorn, tuba or bass trombone and piano (1976), Billaudot, 5’30
- Saphir, for saxophone (baritone and alto) and piano (1982), unpublished, 10’
- Emeraude et Rubis, for two flutes (1982), Transatlantiques, 3’
- Jade, for alto saxophone and percussion (1983), Salabert, 2’30
- Trois Petits préludes, for alto saxophone and piano (1985), Lemoine, 10’
- Tourbillons, for clarinet and piano (1986), Billaudot, 4’30
- Almost a song, for viola and guitar (1995), Eschig, 7’
- Parcours en duo, for baritone saxophone and percussion (2001), unpublished, 8’30
- Bruit de l'eau sur de l'eau, for two violins (2009), Lemoine, 5’

=== Chamber music (small ensembles) ===
- Musique pour trompette et quintette de cuivres (1968), Billaudot, 13’
- Quatuor de saxophones (1974), Billaudot, 13’
- Aube marine, for saxophone quartet (1982), Lemoine, 7’
- Echos dans la vallée, for violin, clarinet and piano (1995), unpublished, 10’

=== Music for orchestra or instrumental ensembles ===
- Monodrame, for violin and orchestra (1969), Billaudot, 18’
- Espaces nocturnes, for eight musicians (1976), Radio-France, 17’
- Harmonie du soir, for 12 string instruments (1975–77), unpublished, 15’
- Ressac, for orchestra (1985), Leduc, 10’
- Cérémonie, for saxophone ensemble (1986), Lemoine, 4’
- Améthyste, for 12 string instruments (1990), unpublished, 9’30
- Des fleurs en forme de diamants, for guitar and 7 instruments (1997, revision in 2003), unpublished, 10’
- Diptyque, for organ and 12 string instruments (2002-2003), unpublished, 12’
- Toute la nature sort de l'or, for 15 instruments (2009), unpublished, 7’

=== Music for voice and/or choir ===
- Quatre mélodies sur le Poème de Cante Jondo de Federico Garcia Lorca, for mezzo or soprano and piano (1965), unpublished, 7’30
- Le journal d'Anne Frank, for female choir and 8 instrumentalists (1968-1970), Billaudot, 27'
- L'Homme qui avait perdu sa voix, for 4 singers and 11 instrumentalists (1984), Radio-France, 35’
- Les Mille-pattes, for children choir and instruments (1989), Lemoine, 13’
- Les Rois-mages, for 6 singers, mixed choir and 11 instrumentalists (1987-1989), Amphion, 60’
- Sept Chants sacrés, for 12 female singers and organ (1990-2003), unpublished, 15’
- Trois Chants pour un Noël, for equal voices choir with an instrumental accompaniment (1995), unpublished, 7’30
- Missa brevis, for mixed choir and organ (1996), unpublished, 12’
- Psaume de joie, for mixed choir, percussion et double bass (1998), unpublished, 10’
- L'Herbier de Colette, for soprano and piano (2004-2006), unpublished, 20’
- Le Noël du grillon, for twelve female singers and three instruments (2007), unpublished, 8'
