= Octobass =

Extremely low-pitched string instrument

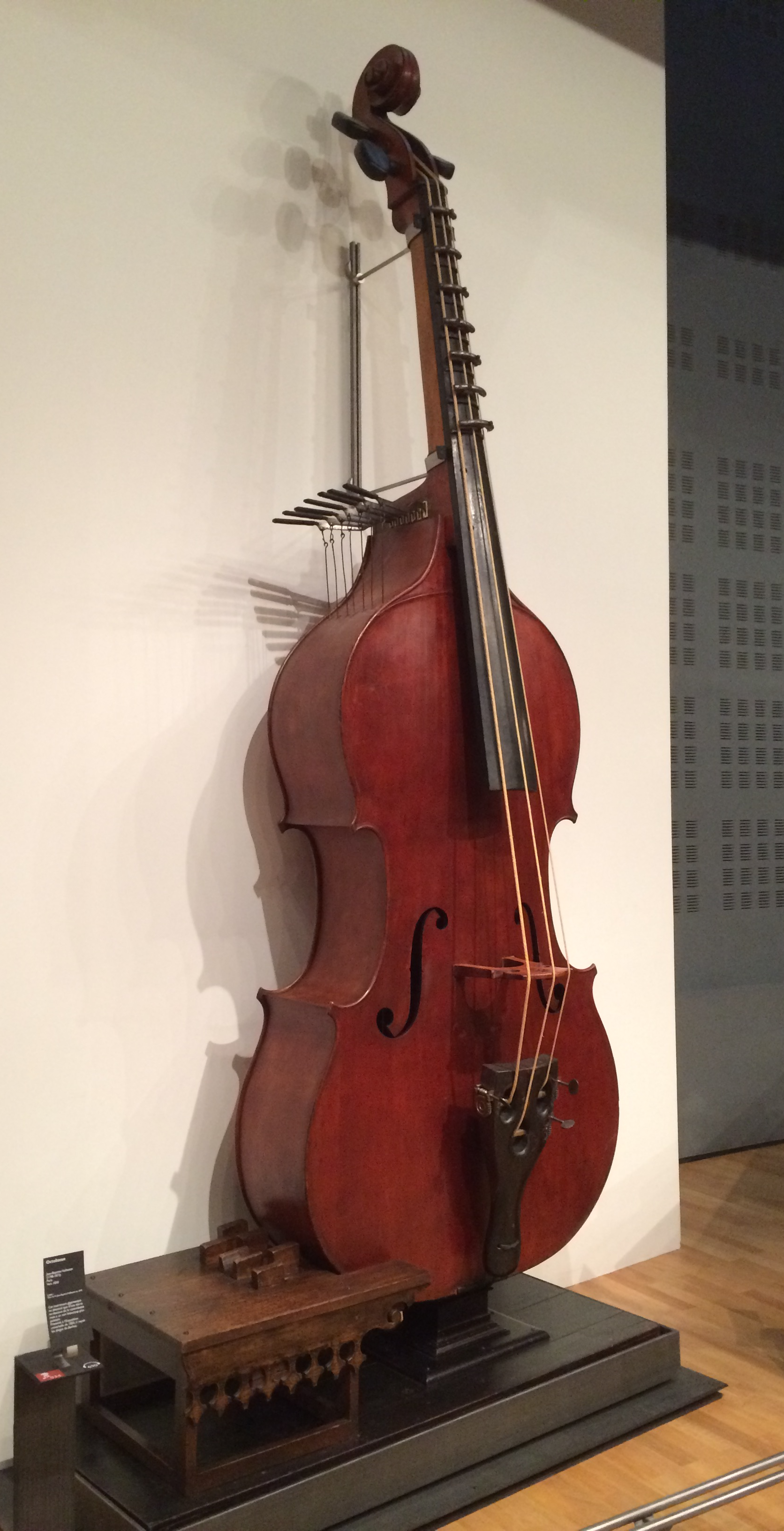
- Photo of an Octobass at Musée de la Musique, Paris.
- Classification: Bowed string instrument
- Inventor: Jean-Baptiste Vuillaume

Related instruments
- Double bass

The octobass is an extremely large and rare bowed string instrument, a larger three-stringed version of the double bass, first drafted by J.A. Dubois in 1834 and built around 1850 in Paris by the French luthier Jean-Baptiste Vuillaume (1798–1875). The specimen in the collection of the Musée de la Musique in Paris - the only surviving original made by Vuillaume - measures 3.48 metres (11 ft 5 in) in length, whereas a full-size double bass is generally approximately 2 m (6 ft 7 in) in length.

The first international public appearance of the octobass was at the first world's fair, which took place in London in 1851. William Pole, an attendee of the 1851 world's fair, described the physical characteristics of the octobass and suggested some uncertainty about the instrument.

== Usage ==
Because it would be impossible for a person to reach the heights of the extremely long fingerboard and because the strings are very thick, the musician plays the octobass using a system of levers and pedals. The levers serve to engage metal clamps that are positioned above the neck at specific positions. These clamps act as fretting devices when the performer presses the levers.

The octobass has never been produced on a large scale, and is not commonly used by composers. After contacting Vuillaume to inquire about the instrument's functions, Hector Berlioz wrote favorably about the instrument, however, and proposed its widespread adoption in his Grand Traité d'instrumentation et d'orchestration modernes, revised in August of 1855.

The only known work that calls for the octobass is Charles Gounod's Messe solennelle de Sainte-Cécile of 1855. In this work, the octobass only appears in the "Benedictus" and the "Agnus Dei" and is specified to be tuned B♭_{0}, E♭_{1}, and B♭_{1}. It typically plays one octave below the double bass.

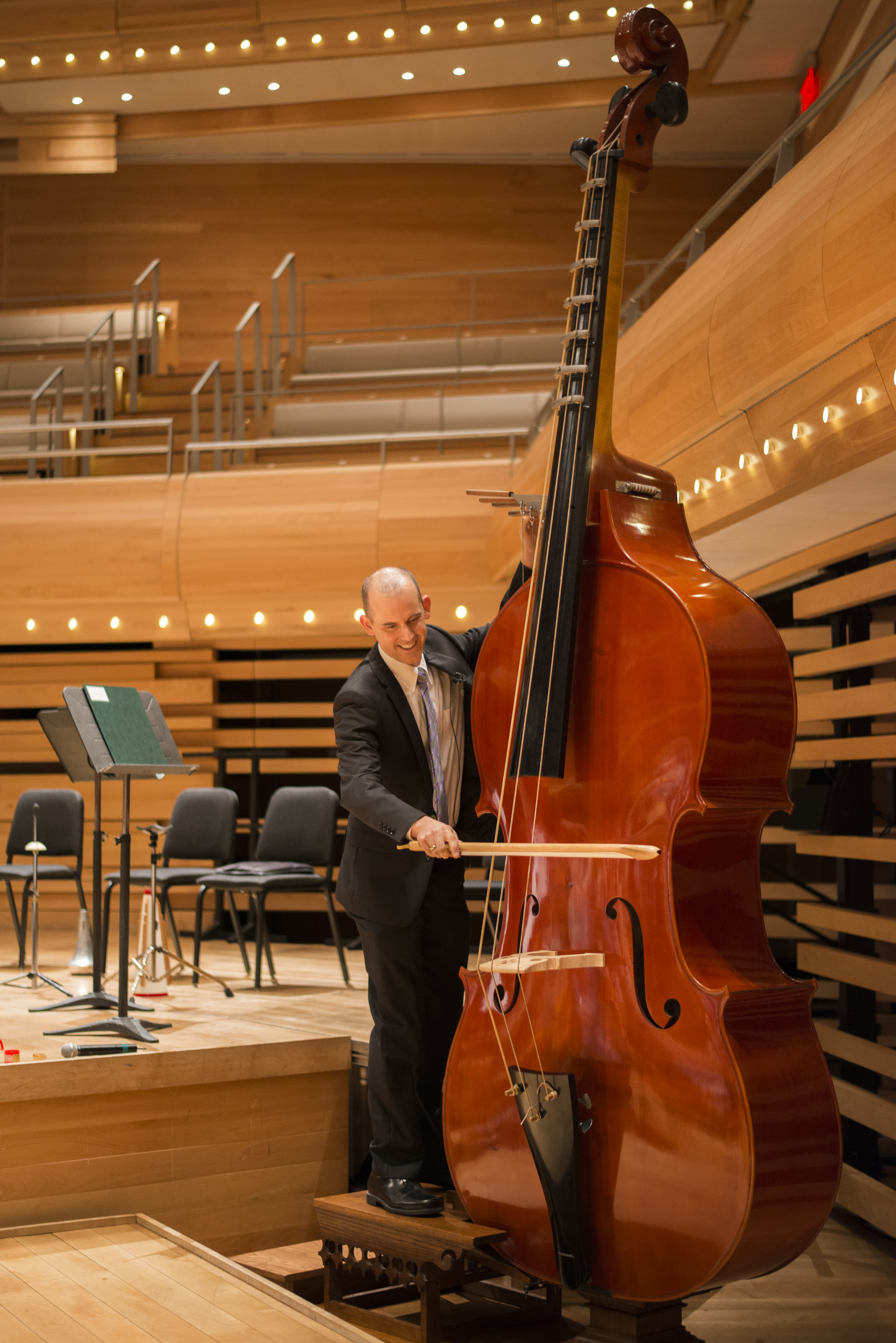
The octobass of the Montreal Symphony Orchestra.

In addition to the Paris instrument, octobasses exist in the collections of the Musical Instrument Museum in Phoenix, Arizona (made in 2007 by the Italian luthier Antonio Dattis), and the Kunsthistorisches Museum in Vienna. The Montreal Symphony Orchestra is currently the only orchestra in the world to own and use the octobass in performances. The first of these instruments was made by the luthier Jean-Jacques Pagès of Mirecourt, France, in 2010.

Two other octobasses are known to exist with private owners. One, which belongs to the Italian musician Nicola Moneta, was made in 1995 by the luthier Pierre Bohr. The instrument is a copy of those made by Vuillaume, but with innovative elements, especially in the mechanics. A library of samples from this instrument was created by Daniele Bertinelli and Giorgio Riolo

in collaboration with SoundIron.

== Range and tuning ==
According to Berlioz, the three open strings were tuned C_{1}, G_{1}, and C_{2}. This tuning gave it a low range

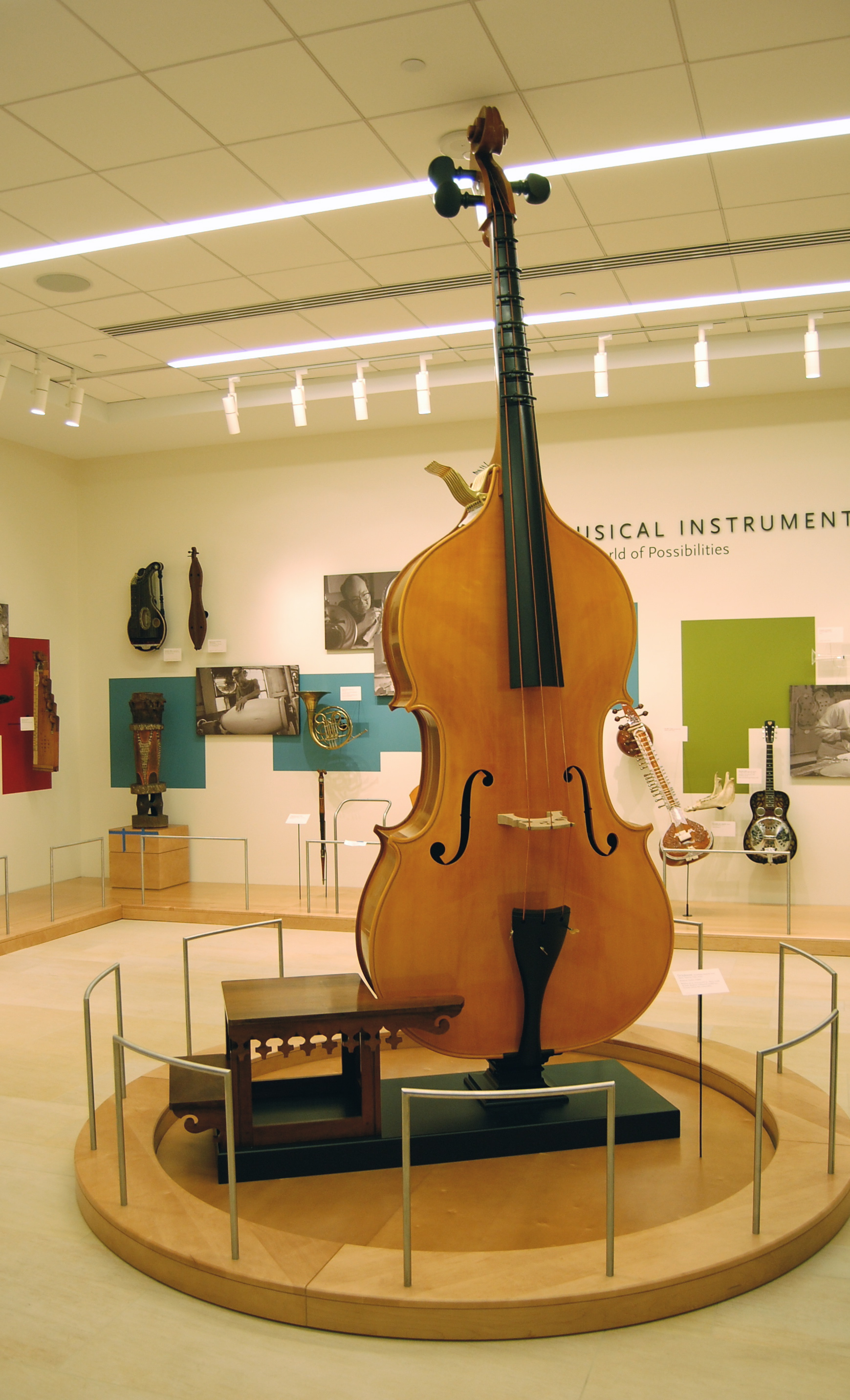
Octobass at The Musical Instrument Museum, Phoenix Arizona

one octave below the cello and equal to the modern double bass with low C extension. However, at the time when the octobass was invented, the double bass lacked this extension and could descend only to E_{1} or G_{1}. The mechanism enabled each string to chromatically cover the range of a perfect fifth and gave the instrument a high range to G_{2}. The instrument at the Musée de la Musique in Paris, which uses period-accurate gut strings, is tuned thus (though on at least some recordings the overall tuning is a half-step flat).

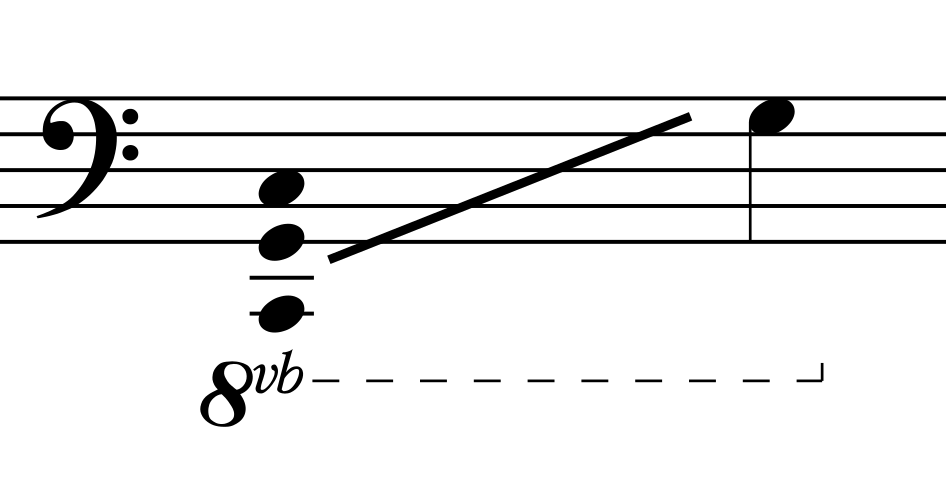
The playing range of the octobass, according to Berlioz.

The instrument at the Musical Instrument Museum in Phoenix, which uses modern wound metal strings, is tuned C_{0}, G_{0}, D_{1}. This tuning gives it a low range two octaves below the cello and one octave below the modern double bass with low C extension. Berlioz specifically noted this tuning in his orchestration treatise, but considered it erroneous. As on the Paris instrument, the mechanism allows each string to cover a perfect fifth, giving it a high range to A_{1}. The fundamental frequencies of the lowest notes in this tuning lie below 20 Hz—the commonly-stated lower bound of human hearing range—but these notes are nevertheless audible due to the overtones they produce. (An organ's 32′ stop also exceeds the supposed 20 Hz limit.)

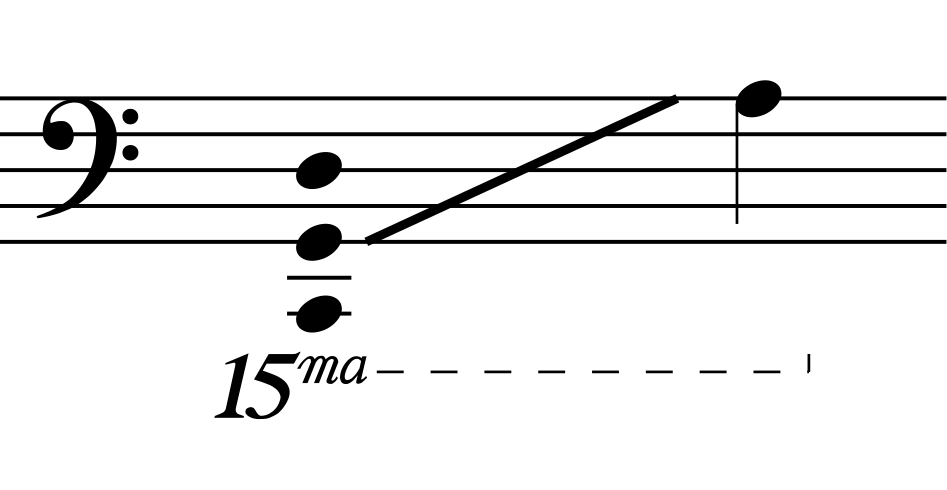
The playing range of the octobass owned by the Musical Instrument Museum in Phoenix, Arizona.

The Montreal Symphony Orchestra octobass uses gut strings, is tuned A_{0}, E_{1}, B_{1} and has a high range to F♯_{2}.

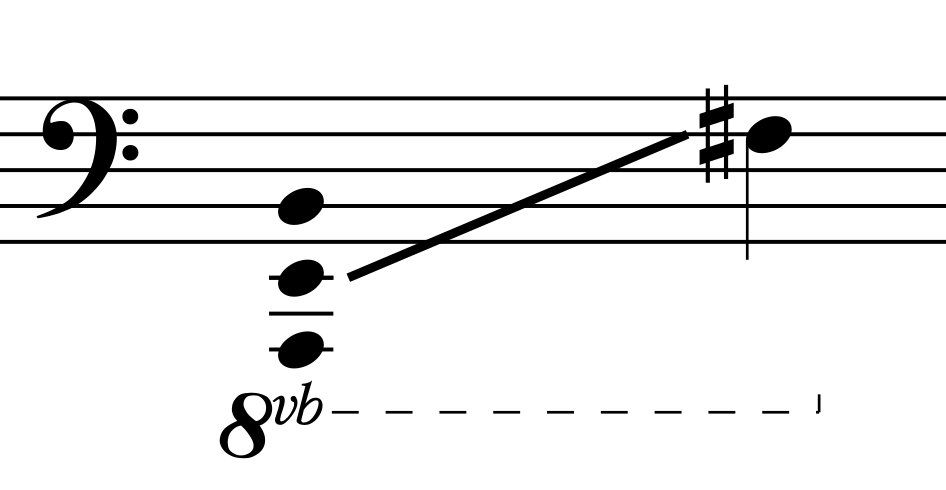
The playing range of the octobass owned by the Montreal Symphony Orchestra.

== See also ==
- Triple contrabass viol
