= Triple contrabass viol =

Modern variant of the French octobass

The triple contrabass viol is a modern variant of the French octobass, closely related to the double bass.

Recordings and performances of sub-contrabass string instruments are rare; over 10 feet (3 m) tall, the triple contrabass viol must be played with the performer on an elevated platform. It was originally a three-stringed baroque instrument tuned C_{0}–G_{0}–C_{1} or C_{0}–G_{0}–D_{1} with the lower C coming in at 16.35 Hz. This is equivalent to the C two octaves below the cello's lowest C.

A four-string variant of the contrabass viol is played by bassist Brian Smith on Roscoe Mitchell's recording, Four Compositions (Lovely Music, 1988). It had two large circular holes in the body to facilitate recording.
