= Marcel Bitsch =

French composer, teacher and analyst (1921–2011)

- Born: Marcel Bitsch; December 9, 1921; Paris, France
- Died: September 21, 2011 (aged 89); Toulouse, France
- Education: Conservatoire de Paris
- Occupation(s): Composer, arranger
- Awards: Prix de Rome

Marcel Bitsch (December 29, 1921, Paris – September 21, 2011, Toulouse) was a French composer, teacher and analyst. He studied at the Conservatoire de Paris and also was professor of counterpoint there.

== Career ==
In 1939, Marcel Bitsch entered the Conservatoire de Paris, where he studied harmony with Jean Gallon, counterpoint with Noël Gallon, musicology with Paul-Marie Masson, and composition with Henri Büsser. After earning his arts degree, Bitsch won the Second Prix de Rome in 1943 and First Grand Prix de Rome in 1945, both times with contemporary Claude Pascal winning the second position.

In 1956, Marcel Bitsch started tenure as professor of counterpoint and later fugue at the Conservatoire de Paris. In his later years, he mostly concentrated on teaching and analysing the music of Johann Sebastian Bach, producing analytic scores whose page layout was designed to convey the music's structural features. Among his students are Daniel Roth, Pierre Pincemaille, and Édith Lejet. He retired in fall of 1988.

== Works ==
- Suite française for oboe and piano
- Quatre variations sur un thème de D. Scarlatti for trumpet
- Cahiers d'études pour la flûte - The published title for this collection is Douze Etudes pour Flute
- Six esquisses symphoniques, 1949
- La farce du Contrebandier, musical comedy, 1946
- Le chalumeau d'or, ballet
- Marvellous Dreams, Twelve easy pieces for the piano, 1947
- Trois sonatines for flute and piano, 1952
- Pastourelles for piano duet (10 pieces, 2 vols), 1956
- Les plaisirs de Sully, 2001
- Douze etudes de rhythme pour clarinette 1957
- Douze etudes pour Cor 1959
- Aubade for alto saxophone and piano, 1978
- Divertissement for flute, oboe, clarinet and bassoon
- Fantasietta for trumpet and piano
- Vingt études pour trompette ut ou si♭, 1954
- Variations sur une chanson francaise, for horn and piano, ca. 1954
- Concertino for bassoon and piano
- Vingt études pour le Basson, 1948

His Douze études pour flûte are not only intended as studies for private practice, but also as brief concert pieces, as stated by flutist Jean-Pierre Rampal in the preface to the Leduc edition. The collection is dedicated to Gaston Crunelle, a former professor of flute at the Conservatoire National de Musique de Paris. Mr. Bitsch himself was a student and later a professor at the Conservatoire.
