= Adolphe Sax =

Belgian musical instrument inventor (1814–1894)

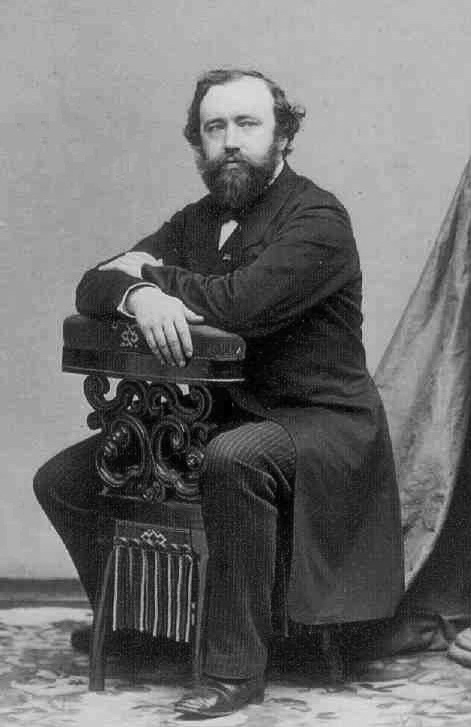
- Sax in the 1850s
- Born: Antoine-Joseph Sax; 6 November 1814; Dinant (present-day Belgium)
- Died: 7 February 1894 (aged 79); Paris, France
- Burial place: Montmartre Cemetery (Cimetière de Montmartre), Paris, France; 48°53′16″N 2°19′49″E
- Education: Royal Conservatory of Brussels
- Occupations: Musician, musical instrument designer
- Known for: Inventor of the saxophone

Antoine-Joseph "Adolphe" Sax (French: [ɑ̃twan ʒozɛf adɔlf saks]; 6 November 1814 – 7 February 1894) (Note: Other sources give alternative dates for Sax's death, mainly 3 and 7 February, including a sign at Sax's grave in Montmartre that says 7 February. 4 February appears in Baker's Biographical Dictionary of Musicians (8th ed., Nicolas Slonimsky); The Harvard Biographical Dictionary of Music (1996 ed., p. 788); and in both the first and second editions of the New Grove Dictionary of Music and Musicians.) was a Belgian inventor and musician who invented the saxophone in the early 1840s, patenting it in 1846. He also invented the saxotromba, saxhorn and saxtuba, and redesigned the bass clarinet in a fashion still used in the 21st century. He played the flute and clarinet.

== Early life ==
Antoine-Joseph Sax was born on 6 November 1814 in Dinant, in a post-Napoleonic polity of what is now Belgium, to Charles-Joseph Sax and his wife Marie-Joseph Masson. He was referred to as Adolphe from childhood, and was the first of eleven children, all of whom he outlived.

Sax survived multiple brushes with death during childhood, according to his first biographer, Oscar Comettant. He fell down three flights of stairs, hitting his head on a stone floor. He drank a glass of vitriol (either mixed with or mistaking it for milk). He was burned either falling onto a hot stove, or by a frying pan, and at a separate time in a gunpowder explosion. He once fell asleep in a room with freshly varnished furniture, but was rescued before succumbing to the fumes. Lastly, he was struck on the head by a falling stone or roof tile, which left a permanent scar on his forehead. Comettant's account has been described as 'often romanticised and not entirely reliable,' but striking when reflecting on Sax's later resilience in the face of adversity. He is said to have been known locally as 'le petit Sax, le revenant', or 'the ghost-child of Dinant.'

Following the fall of the French First Republic, the factory where Charles-Joseph worked as a joiner and cabinet maker had closed, and so in 1815, the Sax family moved to Brussels, where he opened a small instrument makers workshop. He was later appointed an instrument maker to the Dutch Royal court.

Sax was educated at the Royal School of Music, studying flute, harmony and solfège, and received private tutoring in clarinet from Valentin Bender. He attracted the attention of Joseph Küffner but ultimately rejected a career in performance in favor of his father's workshop. He is said to have exhibited improved clarinets he had either developed himself (1830) or assisting his father (1835) at the Brussels Industrial Exhibition.

== Career and later life ==
Sax began to experiment with new instrument designs, while his parents continued their business of making conventional instruments. Sax's first important invention was an improvement in bass clarinet design, which he patented at the age of 24. He relocated permanently to Paris in 1842 and began working on a new set of valved bugles. While he did not invent this instrument, his examples were much more successful than those of his rivals and became known as saxhorns. Hector Berlioz was so enamoured of these that he arranged in February 1844 for one of his pieces to be played entirely on saxhorns. They were made in seven different sizes and paved the way for the creation of the flugelhorn. Today saxhorns are sometimes used in concert bands, marching bands, and orchestras. The saxhorn also laid the groundwork for the modern euphonium.

Sax also developed the saxotromba family, valved brass instruments with narrower bore than the saxhorns, in 1845, though they survived only briefly.

The use of saxhorns spread rapidly. The saxhorn valves were accepted as state-of-the-art in their time and remain largely unchanged today. The advances made by Adolphe Sax were soon followed by the British brass band movement, which exclusively adopted the saxhorn family of instruments. A decade after saxhorns became available, the Jedforest Instrumental Band (1854) and The Hawick Saxhorn Band (1855) were formed in the Scottish Borders.

The period around 1840 saw Sax inventing the clarinette-bourdon, an early unsuccessful design of contrabass clarinet. On 28 June 1846 he patented the saxophone, intended for use in orchestras and military bands. By 1846 Sax had designed saxophones ranging from sopranino to subcontrabass, although not all were built. Composer Hector Berlioz wrote approvingly of the new instrument in 1842, but despite his support, saxophones did not become a standard part of the orchestra. Their ability to play technical passages easily like woodwinds yet project loudly like brass instruments led to their inclusion in military bands in France and elsewhere.

During the Crimean War (1853–1856), Sax made two more inventions, though neither was ever actually built: First, he designed the "Saxotonnerre", a massive, locomotive-powered organ which was supposed to be so loud as to be heard across all of Paris at once. The second was developed in response to the Crimean War's Siege of Sevastopol where the French military and its allies were locked in a destructive conflict. As a potential solution to such lengthy sieges, Sax thus designed the "Saxocannon", a giant cannon whose half-ton round shots would be powerful enough to completely destroy an "average-sized city".

Sax's reputation eventually helped secure him a job teaching at the Paris Conservatory in 1857. He continued to make instruments later in life and presided over the new saxophone course at the Paris Conservatory. Legal troubles involving patents continued for over 20 years, with rival instrument makers attacking the legitimacy of his patents and Sax suing them for patent infringement. He was driven into bankruptcy three times: in 1852, 1873 and 1877.

Sax suffered from lip cancer between 1853 and 1858 but made a full recovery. In 1894 he died of pneumonia in Paris, in poverty, and was interred in section 5 (Avenue de Montebello) at the Cimetière de Montmartre in Paris.

Other invented instruments

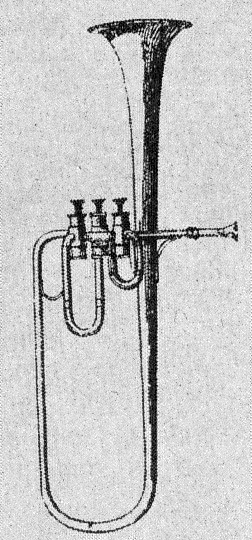
Saxotromba

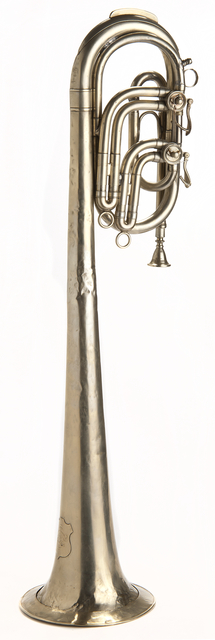
Saxhorn

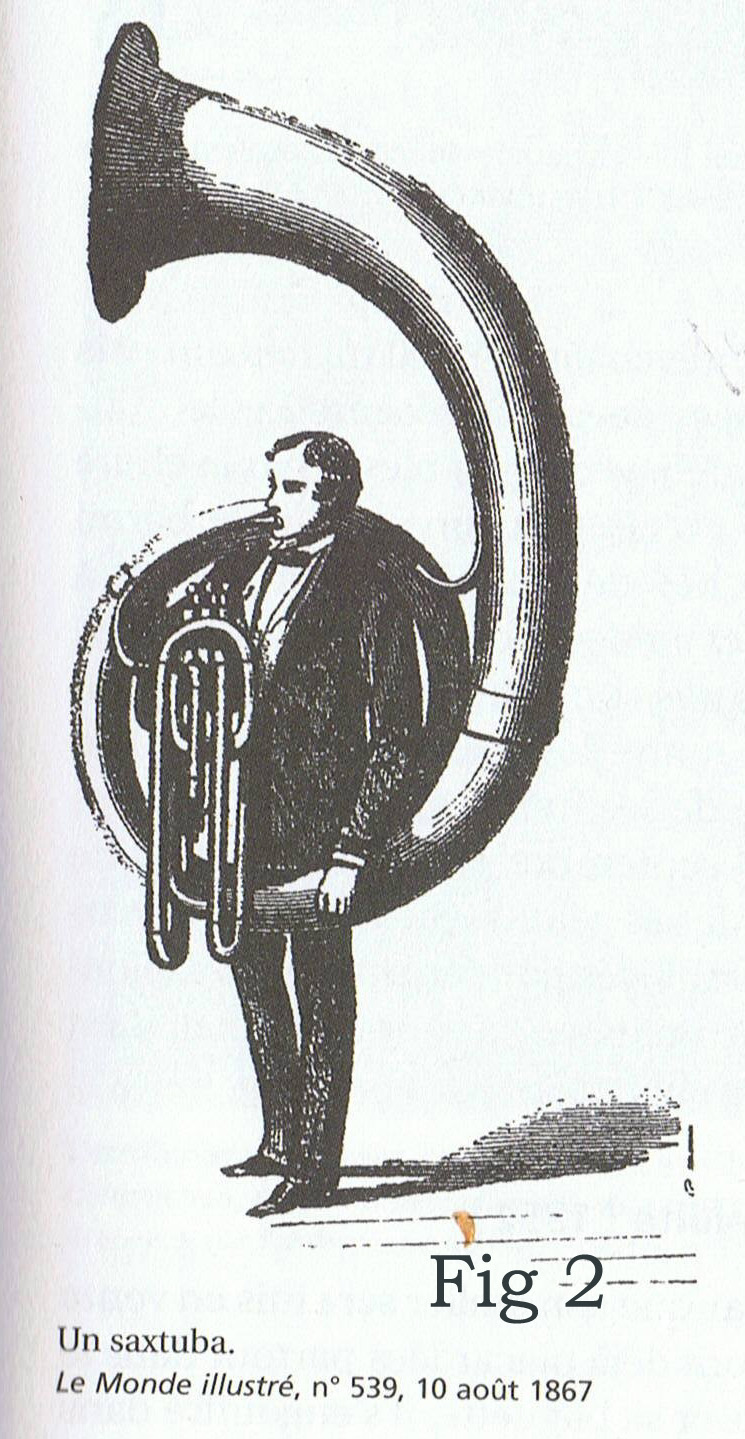
Saxtuba

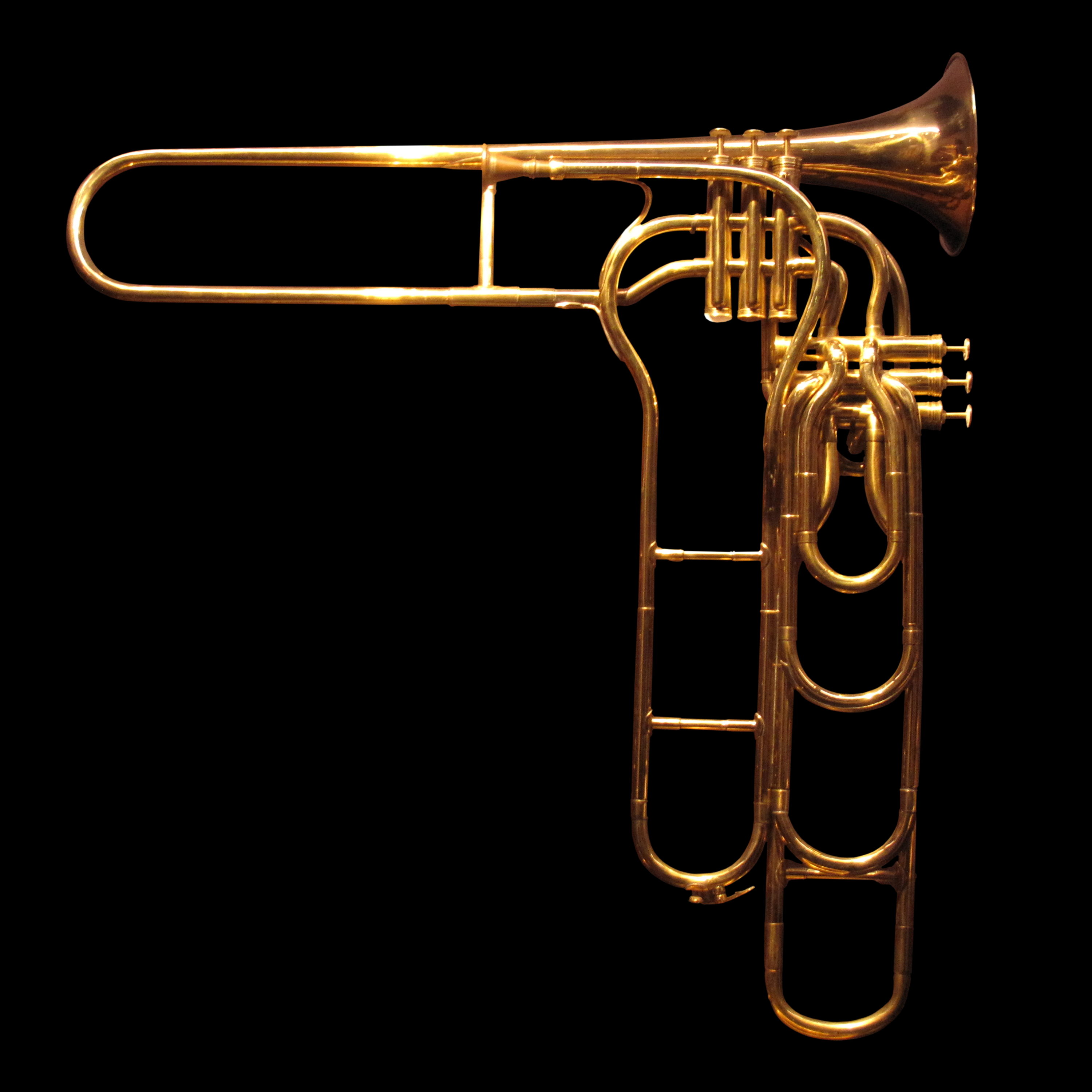
6-piston trombone

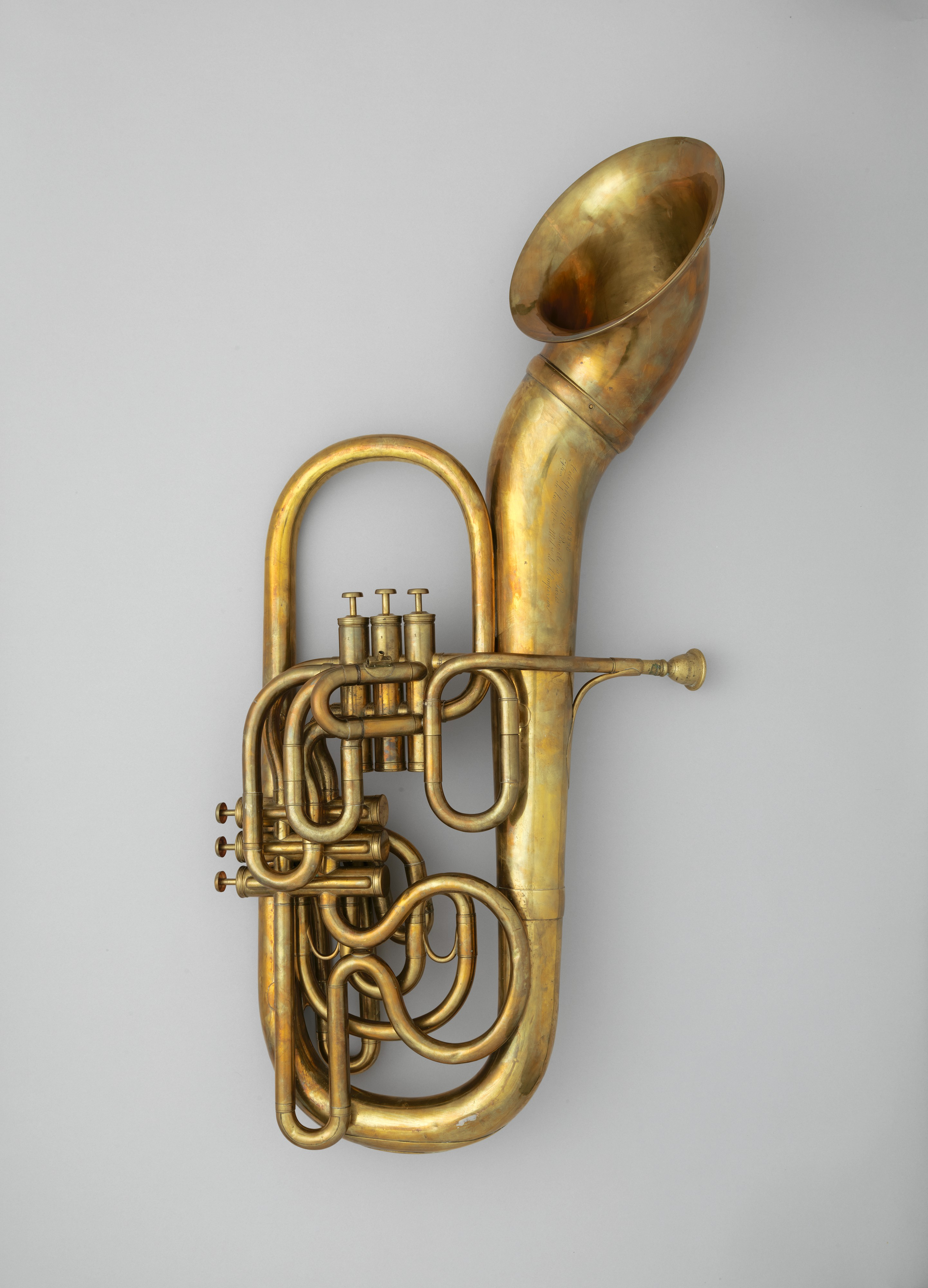
A bass saxhorn, 1863

== Honors and awards ==
In his birthplace Dinant in Belgium, Mr Sax's House is dedicated to his life and saxophones.

- 1849: Awarded the Chevalier rank of the Legion of Honour.
- 1867: 1^{e} Grand Prix de la Facture Instrumentale at the 1867 Paris International Exposition.
- 1995: In 1995, his likeness was featured on the front of Belgium's 200 Belgian francs banknote.
- 2015: Google Doodle commemorated his 201st birthday.

== In popular culture ==
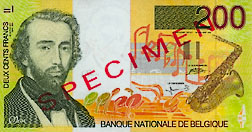
Adolphe Sax depicted on a 200 Belgian franc banknote.

- Adolphe Sax was depicted on the 200 Belgian franc banknotes alongside his invention: the saxophone
- The asteroid 3534 Sax was named in his honour
- The album Sax Pax For A Sax by the composer Louis Thomas Hardin, known as Moondog, recorded in 1994, is a tribute marking the centenary of Adolphe Sax’s death
- Adolphe Sax is mentioned in The Simpsons (Season 28, Episode 1), during a discussion between Lisa and Mr Burns concerning a show project
- Adolphe Sax is a character in the children’s novel Le Swing des Marquises by Muriel Bloch
- Adolphe Sax is a folkloric giant of Dinant, created by Les Géants de Dinant et leurs Mougneux d’Coûtches in 2014, on his 200th birthday
- A museum (La Maison de Monsieur Sax) and a tourist trail are dedicated to him in his home town of Dinant
- A monument entitled Adolphe Sax, a work by the sculptor Félix Roulin, stands in Dinant

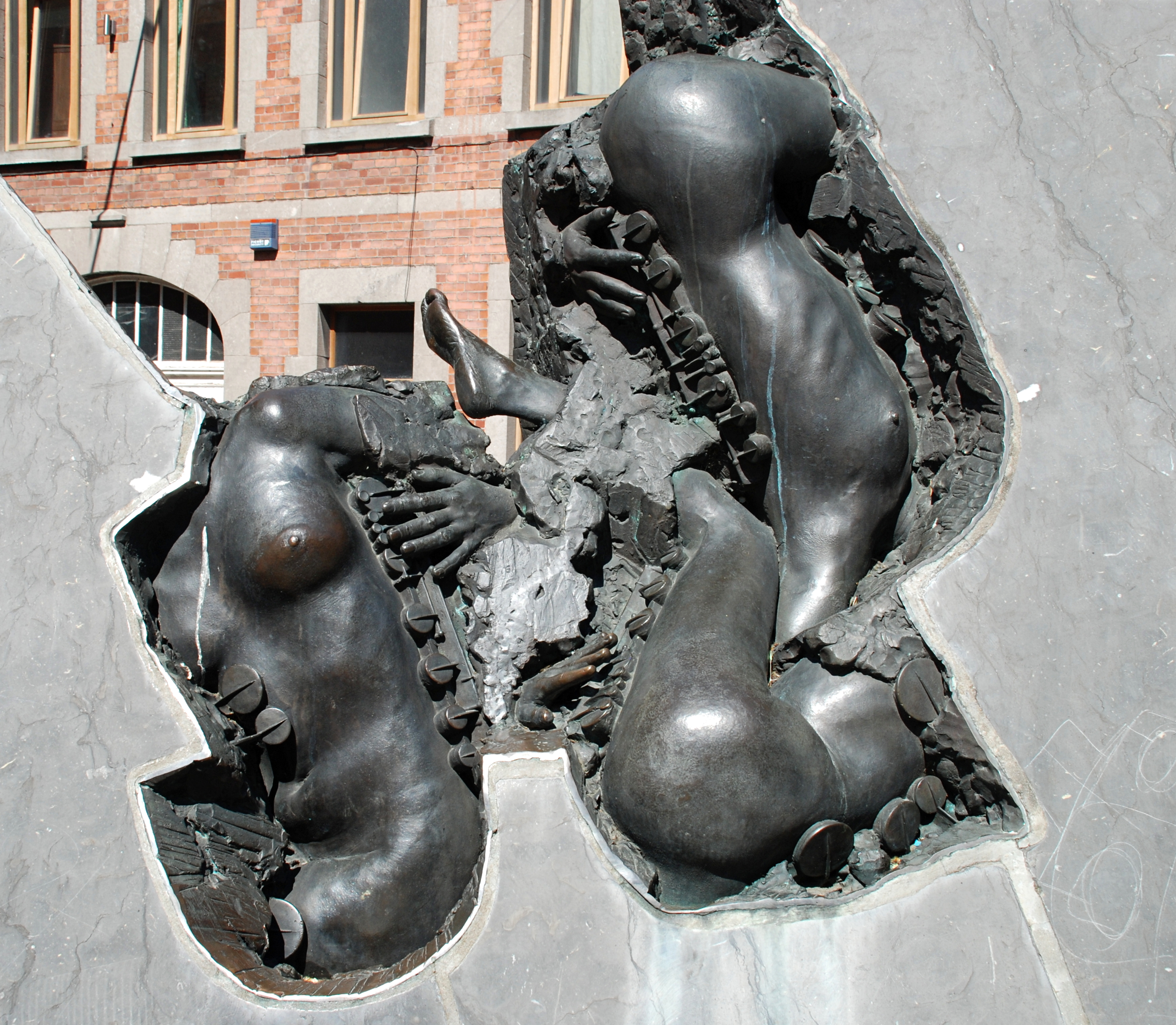
Félix Roulin, Monument Adolphe Sax, Dinant.

== Bibliography ==
- Adolphe Sax and His Saxophone. KOCHNITZKY, Leon. New York, Belgian Government Information Center, 1949.
- SAX REVOLUTIONS: Adolphe Sax’s life. DIAGO, José-Modesto (dir. and prod.); Spain, [EnFin Producciones] 2014, 64 min: son. col.
- Haine, Malou, ed. (1980), Adolphe Sax, Bruxelles University
- Thiollet, Jean-Pierre (2004), Sax, Mule & Co, Paris: H & D, ISBN 2-914266-03-0
- Horwood, Wally, ed. (1983), Adolphe Sax 1814–1894 — His Life and Legacy, Egon Publishers Ltd., ISBN 0-905858-18-2
- Ingham, Richard, ed. (1998), The Cambridge Companion to the Saxophone, Cambridge University Press, ISBN 978-0-521-59666-4
- Cottrell, Stephen (2013). The Saxophone. Yale University Press. p. 33. ISBN 978-0-300-19095-3.
- Williams, Gavin (2019). "Introduction: Sound Unmade". In Williams, Gavin (ed.). Hearing the Crimean War: Wartime Sound and the Unmaking of Sense. Oxford: Oxford University Press. pp. xv–1. ISBN 978-0190916756.
