= Saxhorn =

Family of valved brass instruments

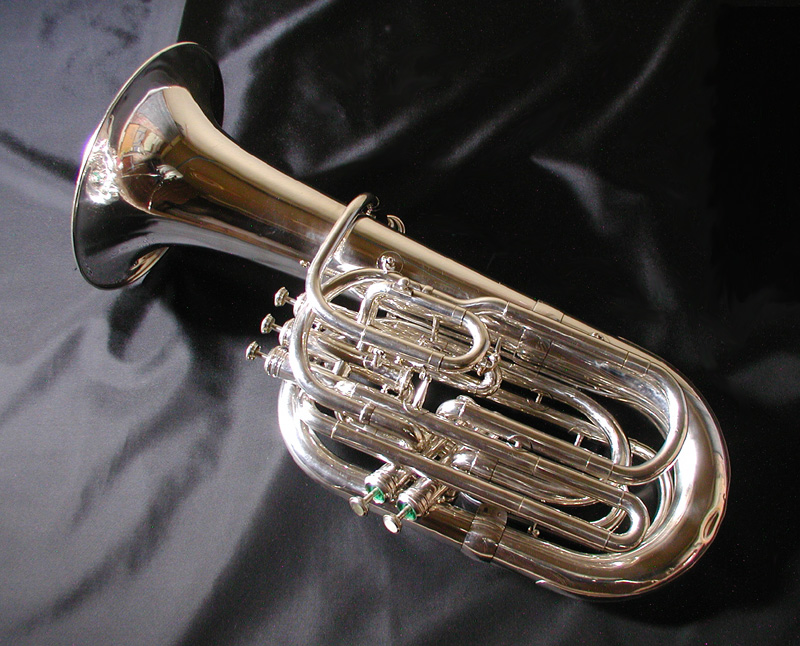
- A modern 5-valved bass saxhorn

Brass instrument
- Classification: Wind; Brass; Aerophone
- Hornbostel–Sachs classification: 423.232 (Valved aerophone sounded by lip vibration)
- Developed: Mid 19th century by Adolphe Sax

Playing range
- As written in treble clef, for three-valved instruments. Instruments with four or more valves can play to low C♯ (marked V).

Related instruments
- Modern saxhorns: Flugelhorn; Tenor horn; Baritone horn; Euphonium; Tuba (in E♭ and B♭); Other instruments: Cornet; Mellophone; Sudrophone

The saxhorn is a family of valved brass instruments that have conical bores and deep cup-shaped mouthpieces. The saxhorn family was developed by Adolphe Sax, who is also known for creating the saxophone family. The sound of the saxhorn has a characteristic mellow tone quality and blends well with other brass.

== The saxhorn family ==
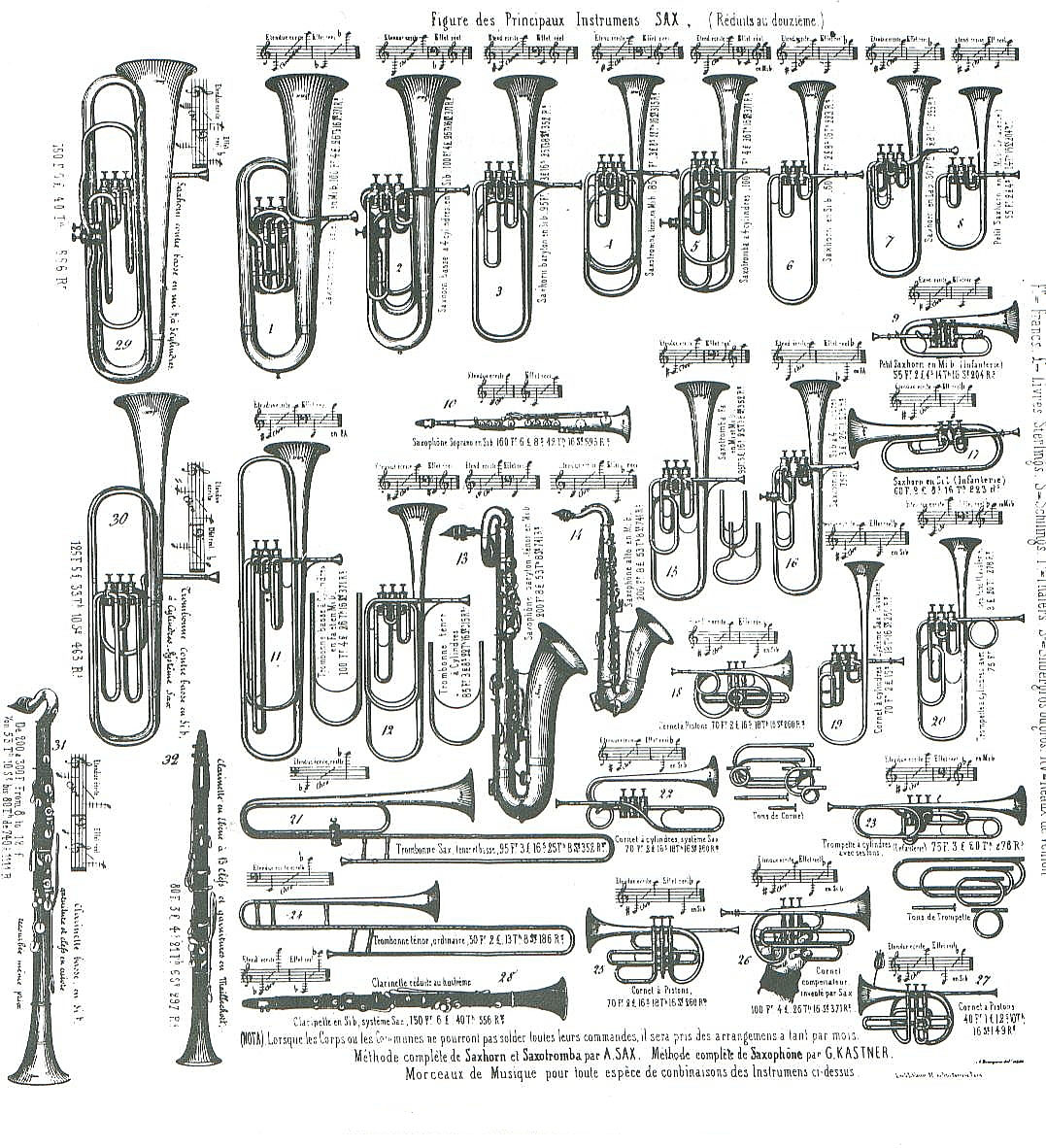
A catalogue showing various Adolphe Sax instruments, including saxhorns, saxophones, and saxotrombas

The saxhorns form a family of seven brass instruments (although at one point ten different sizes seem to have existed). Designed for band use, they are pitched alternately in E♭ and B♭, like the saxophone group.

Modern saxhorns still manufactured and in use:

- B♭ soprano saxhorn: flugelhorn
- E♭ alto or tenor saxhorn: tenor horn
- B♭ baritone saxhorn: baritone horn
- B♭ bass saxhorn: euphonium
- E♭ bass saxhorn: E♭ bass tuba
- B♭ contrabass saxhorn: B♭ contrabass tuba

Historically, much confusion exists as to the nomenclature of the various instruments in different languages.

The following table lists the members of the saxhorn family as described in the orchestration texts of Hector Berlioz and Cecil Forsyth, the J. Howard Foote catalog of 1893, and modern names. The modern instrument names continue to exhibit inconsistency, denoted by a "/" between the two names in use. Pitch given is the sounding pitch of a written middle C (second partial, no valves depressed), in scientific pitch notation.

Foote	Berlioz	Forsyth	Modern		Pitch
---	Sopranino in C/B♭	---			C5/B♭4
---	Soprano in E♭	Sopranino in E♭	Sopranino/Soprano in E♭	---	E♭4
---	Alto in B♭	Soprano in B♭	Soprano/Alto in B♭	flugelhorn	B♭3
Alto in E♭	Tenor in E♭	Alto in E♭	Alto/Tenor in E♭	tenor horn	E♭3
Tenor in B♭	Baritone in B♭	Tenor in B♭	Tenor/Baritone in B♭	baritone horn	B♭2
Baritone in B♭	Bass in B♭	Bass in B♭	Baritone/Bass in B♭	euphonium	B♭2
Bass in E♭	Contrabass in E♭	Bass in E♭	Bass in E♭	E♭ bass tuba	E♭2
---	Contrabass in B♭	Contrabass in B♭	Contrabass in B♭	B♭ contrabass tuba	B♭1
Contrabass in E♭	Contrabass in low E♭	---			E♭1
---	Bourdon in B♭	---		subcontrabass tuba	B♭0

This list is not exhaustive of historic nomenclature for the saxhorns, for which there may exist no comprehensive and authoritative source.

=== Ranges of individual members ===
The saxhorn is based on the same three-valve system as most other valved brass instruments. Each member of the family is named after the root note produced by the second partial with no valves actuated. Each member nominally possesses or possessed the typical three-valve brass range from the note one tritone below that root note (second partial, all valves actuated) to the note produced by eighth partial with no valves actuated, i.e., the note two octaves above the root note.

All the modern members of the family are transposing instruments written in the treble clef with the root note produced by the second partial with no valves actuated being written as middle C, though the baritone horn often plays bass clef parts, especially in concert band music and when playing parts written for the trombone.

== History ==
Developed during the mid-to-late 1830s, the saxhorn family was patented in Paris in 1845 by Adolphe Sax. During the 19th century, the debate as to whether the saxhorn family was truly new, or rather a development of previously existing instruments, was the subject of prolonged lawsuits.

Throughout the mid-1850s, Sax continued to experiment with the instrument's valve pattern.

The Trojan March (Marche Troyenne) of the Berlioz opera Les Troyens (1856–58) features an on-stage band which includes a family of saxhorns. The Royal Hunt and Storm (Chasse Royale) from the same opera uses them orchestrally. Sir John Eliot Gardiner wanted to use them in his 2003 recording, but was unable to borrow them from major conservatoires; he was eventually put in touch with a private collector who loaned him a set.

Saxhorns were popularized by the distinguished Distin Quintet, who toured Europe during the mid-19th century. This family of musicians, publishers and instrument manufacturers had a significant impact on the growth of the brass band movement in Britain during the mid- to late-19th century.

The saxhorn was the most common brass instrument in American Civil War bands. The over-the-shoulder variety of the instrument was used, as the backward-pointing bell of the instrument allowed troops marching behind the band to hear the music. The saxhorn is used in Regional Mexican music, where it is called saxor, charcheta or armonía, and serves as a rhythmic and harmonic instrument.

Contemporary works featuring this instrument are Désiré Dondeyne's Tubissimo for bass tuba or saxhorn and piano (1983), Olivier Messiaen's Et exspecto resurrectionem mortuorum (1964), and Dmitri Shostakovich's "March of the Soviet Militia" (1970).

Historical saxhorns
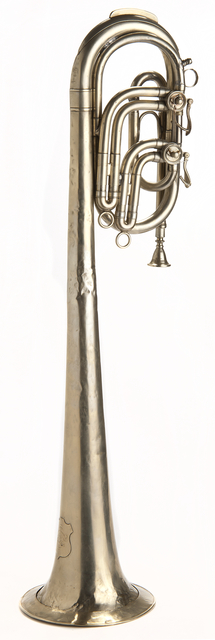
Saxhorn used by the 1st Minnesota Volunteer Infantry Regiment during the Civil War. The backward-facing bell version became the most common brass instrument in Civil War bands so that troops marching behind the band could hear the music. From the collection of the Minnesota Historical Society.

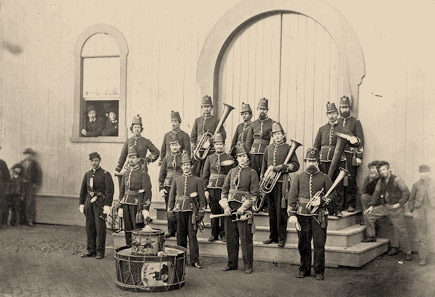
Band of 10th Veteran Reserve Corps, Washington, D.C., April, 1865

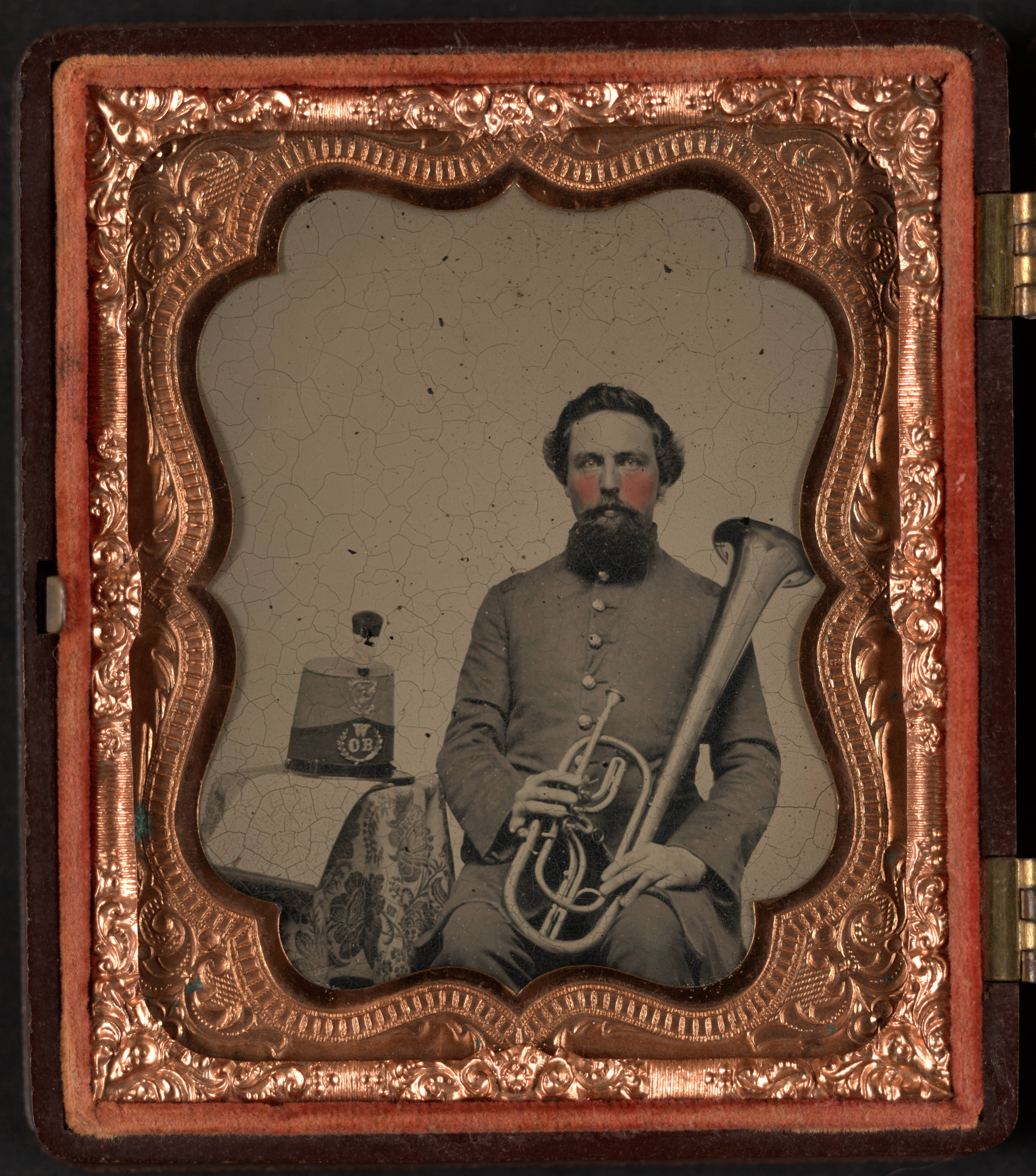
Unidentified soldier of Co. H, 13th Virginia Infantry Regiment in uniform with over the shoulder saxhorn

== Discography ==
- Saxhorn et piano – Hybrid'Music Label – October 2008
- David Maillot, saxhorn - Géraldine Dutroncy, piano – Works by Eugène Bozza, Marcel Bitsch, Jacques Castérède, Alain Bernaud, Henri Tomasi, Claude Pascal, Gérard Devos, and Roger Boutry.
- 14 Volumes of saxhorn band are available featuring The First Brigade Band.
