= Bass trombone =

Bass instrument in the trombone family

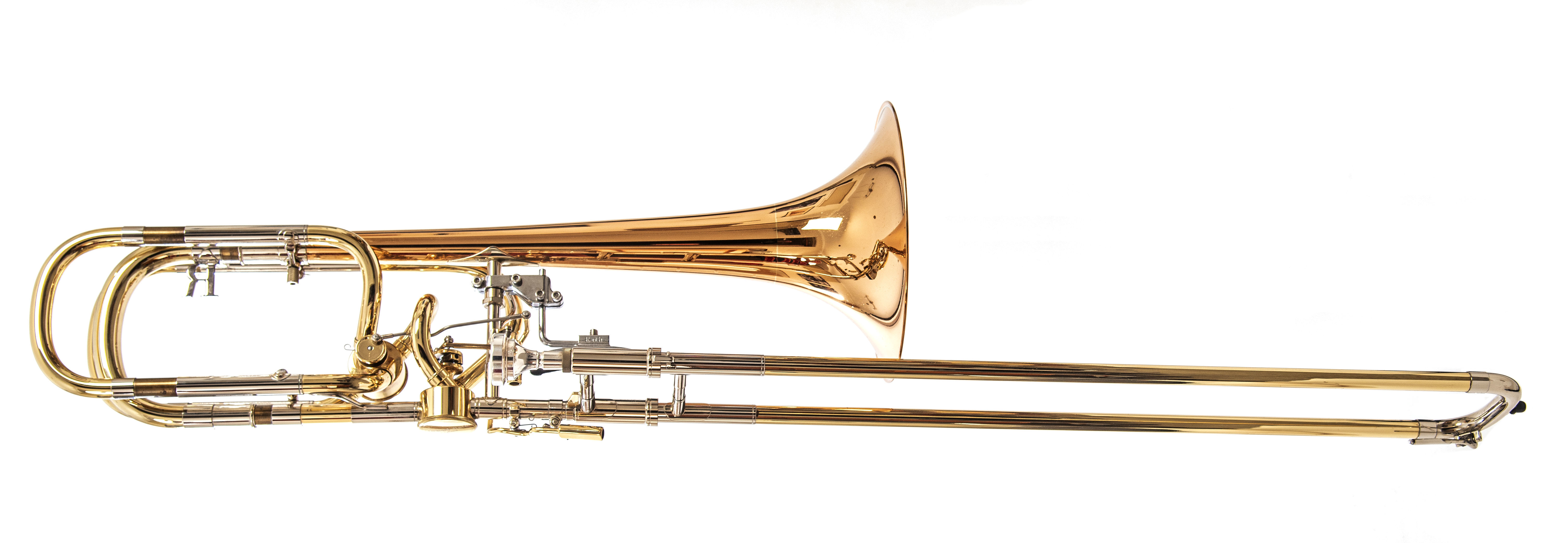
- Bass trombone with two valves in F and D

Brass instrument
- Classification: Wind; Brass; Aerophone
- Hornbostel–Sachs classification: 423.22 (Sliding aerophone sounded by lip vibration)
- Developed: Late 16th century

Playing range

Related instruments
- Trombone; Contrabass trombone; Cimbasso

Musicians
- Ben van Dijk; George Roberts; Douglas Yeo

The bass trombone is the bass instrument in the trombone family of brass instruments. Modern instruments are pitched in the same B♭ as the tenor trombone but with a larger bore, bell and mouthpiece to facilitate low register playing, and usually two valves to fill in the missing range immediately above the pedal tones.

== History ==
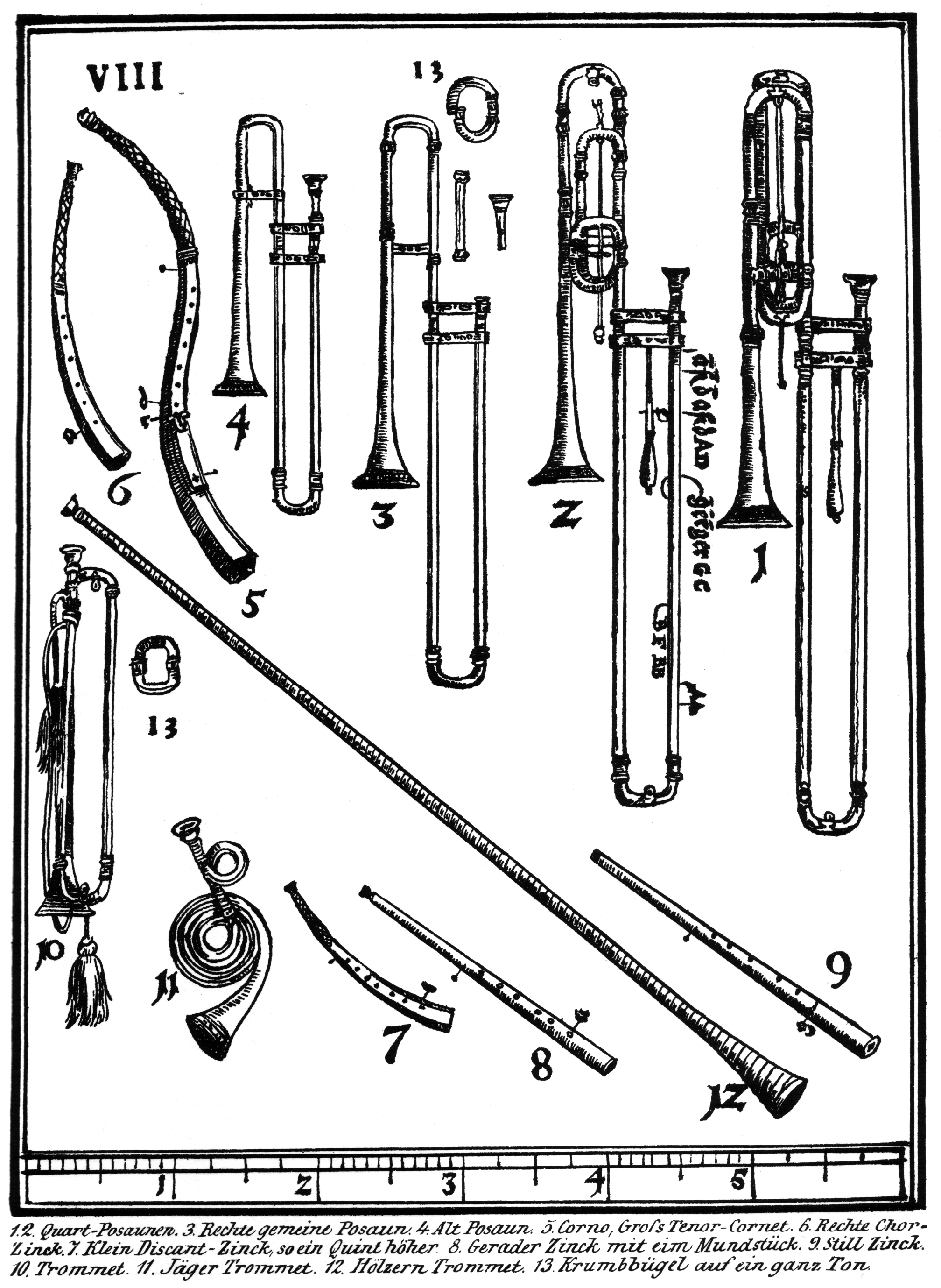
Trombones in Syntagma Musicum (1614–20), by Michael Praetorius

The earliest bass trombones were pitched a minor third, fourth, or fifth below the tenor, which was then pitched in A. Early trombones, or sackbuts, had a smaller bore and less flared bell than modern instruments, and bass sackbuts also had a longer slide with an attached handle, which allowed slide positions otherwise beyond the reach of a fully outstretched arm. Bass sackbuts were sometimes called terz-posaun, quart-posaun, and quint-posaun (Old German, lit. 'third' or 'fourth' or 'fifth trombone', referring to intervals below the tenor), though quartposaune was later used generically to refer to any size of bass trombone.

The earliest known surviving specimen is an instrument built in France in 1593 pitched in G (modern A=440 Hz). Other late 16th and early 17th-century specimens of basses survive by Nuremberg makers Anton Schnitzer, Isaac Ehe, and Hans and Sebastian Heinlein. These instruments match descriptions and illustrations by Praetorius from his Syntagma Musicum (1614–20), by which time he only described basses in E or D (modern F or E♭) a fourth or a fifth below the tenor, and an octav-posaun which referred to a very large, rare, and unwieldy predecessor of the contrabass trombone. Based on Praetorius' descriptions, Canadian trombonist and early music specialist Maximilien Brisson proposes that a quint-posaun with an extra whole-tone crook resulted in an instrument in C, capable of playing down to the lowest G_{1} open string of the G Violone. By the late 17th century, the bass sackbut was mainly in D; German scholar and composer Daniel Speer only saw fit to mention the quint-posaun in his treatise Grundrichtiger Unterricht (1687).

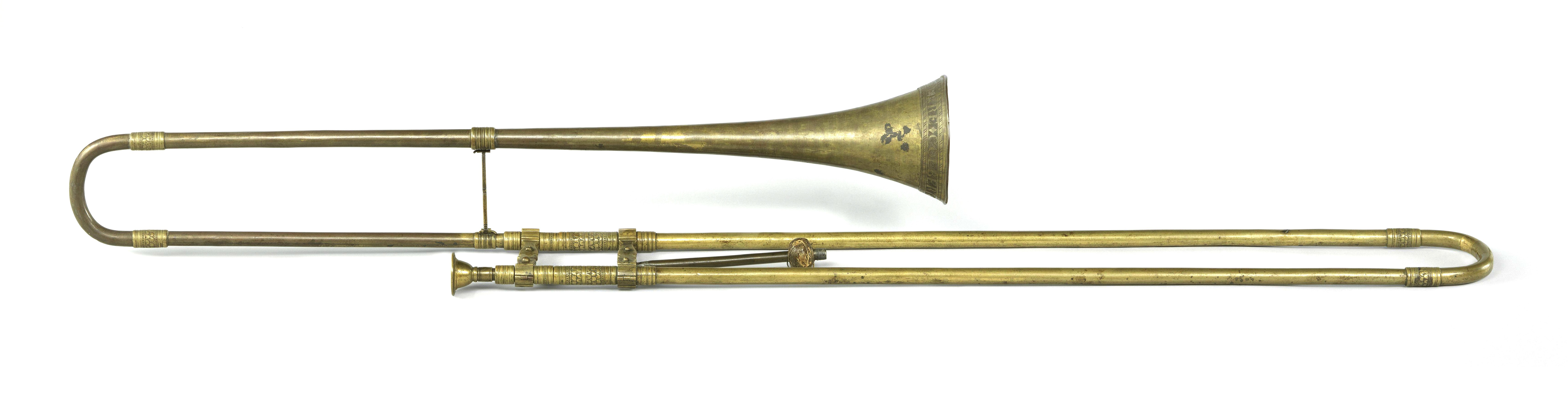
The earliest known bass trombone, built in G by Pierre Colbert, Reims, 1593. Rijksmuseum, Netherlands

Bass sackbuts were used in Europe during the Renaissance and early Baroque periods. By the 18th century, the F and E♭ bass trombones were used in Germany, Austria and Sweden, and the E♭ bass trombone in France.

=== The "tenor-bass" trombone ===
German instrument maker Christian Friedrich Sattler in 1821 created an instrument he called the Tenorbaßposaune (lit. 'tenor-bass trombone'), a tenor in B♭ built with the larger bore and mouthpiece from the F bass trombone. It facilitated playing bass trombone parts in the low register, but was missing notes below E_{2}. Treatise author Georges Kastner and other contemporary writers described a dissatisfaction with bass instruments in F or E♭, due to their slow and unwieldy slides. The invention of valves was quickly applied to create valve trombones in the 1830s which replaced the slide altogether; these became popular in military bands and Italian opera.

In 1839 Sattler invented the Quartventil (lit. 'fourth valve'), a valve attachment for a B♭ tenor trombone to lower the instrument a fourth into F. Intended to bridge the range gap of the tenor trombone between E_{2} and B♭_{1}, it was quickly adopted for bass trombone parts, particularly in Germany. These instruments in B♭/F gradually replaced the larger bass trombones in F and E♭ over the course of the 19th and early 20th centuries. Late Romantic German composers specifying Tenorbaßposaune in scores intended a B♭/F trombone capable of playing below E_{2}; Arnold Schoenberg called for four in Gurre-Lieder (1911).

=== The bass trombone in Britain ===
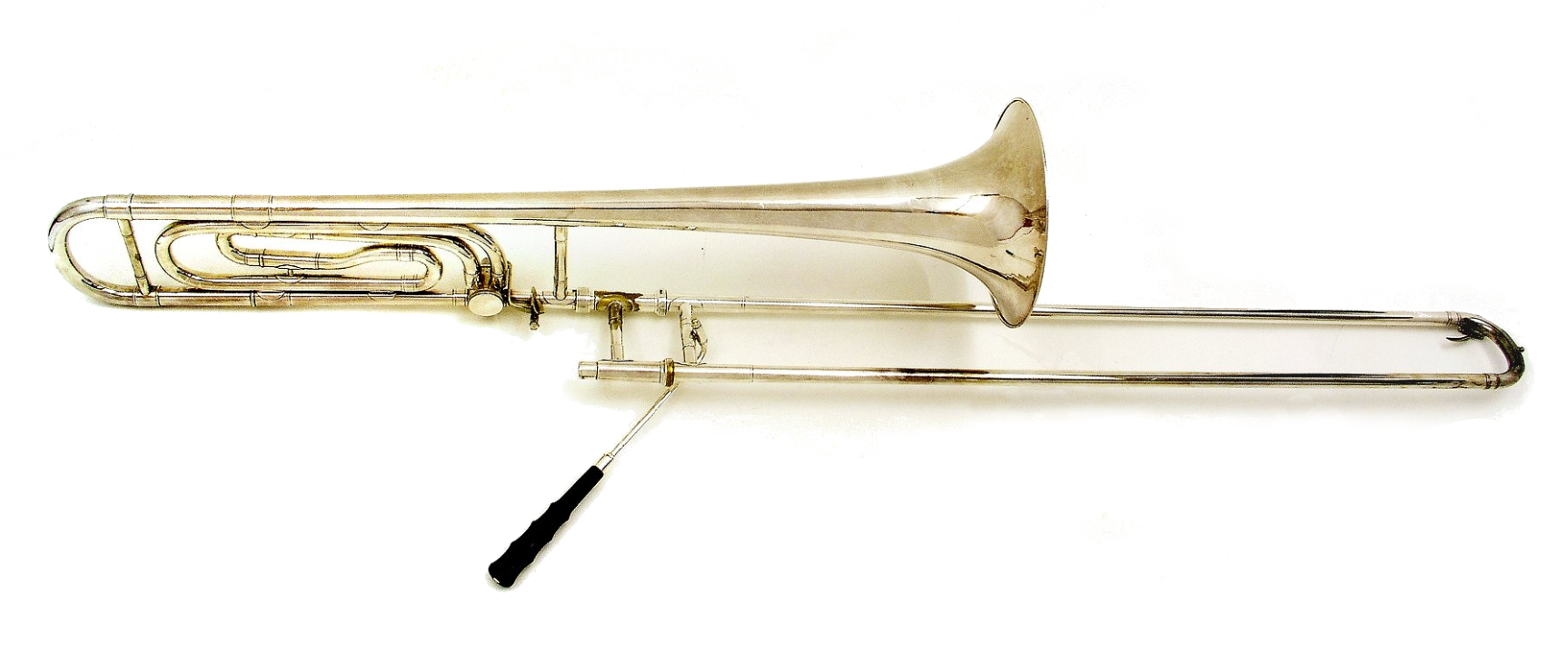
Bass trombone in G, "Betty" model with D valve. St Cecilia's Hall, Musical Instrument Museums Edinburgh

From about the mid-nineteenth century, the bass trombone in G enjoyed a period of extended popularity in Britain and throughout most of the British Empire, and also a limited uptake in France. In British military and brass bands, the G bass trombone became standard, built largely by makers Besson, Boosey & Co., and Hawkes & Son (and later, Boosey & Hawkes) with no valves and a slide handle for reaching the longer sixth and seventh positions. The sight of the G bass trombone in the front rank of marching bands, with the player extending the long-handled slide, led to its "kidshifter" nickname, as if clearing a path for the band through the crowds.

Instruments were made as early as 1869 in France with a Quartventil valve attachment in D, which extends the low register below D♭_{2}, the lowest (non-pedal) note in seventh position. British orchestras began to employ them from the early twentieth century. In 1932, Boosey & Hawkes introduced a "Betty" model, named after Bournemouth Symphony Orchestra bass trombonist William Betty, with a D valve and a second longer tuning slide for C (to obtain the low A♭_{1} above the first pedal G_{1}). While British composers, writing for a G bass trombone without a valve, avoided writing below D♭_{2} between 1850 and 1950, the D (or C) valve allowed British orchestral players to play European repertoire written with bass trombones in F or E♭ in mind.

The G bass trombone remained in use in orchestras until the 1950s, when London orchestral players began importing larger bore American instruments in B♭ particularly by Conn. The G trombone lingered on in some parts of Britain and former British colonies well into the 1980s, particularly in brass bands and period instrument orchestras.

British organologist Arnold Myers suggests that the G trombone's small bore of around 12.35 millimetres (0.486 in), or 13.35 millimetres (0.526 in) for the "Betty" D valve models, lends a distinctive and uniquely British character to its sound, and historically informed performances of British works from this period should recreate this sound by employing small-bore tenor trombones and a G bass trombone.

=== Development of the modern instrument ===
The modern bass trombone evolved largely in the United States, from the German large-bore B♭/F tenor-bass trombones in use by the late 19th century. In the early 20th century, manufacturers attempted to solve the problem of the missing low B_{1} on such instruments by adding a second valve. In the 1920s, manufacturers Conn and Holton made B♭/F bass trombones with a Stellventil (lit. 'static valve') that could lower the F tubing to E when manually set. The first true double-valve trombone, where the second valve can be operated while playing, was made by Los Angeles manufacturer F. E. Olds in 1937, using a second dependent valve to lower the F attachment a semitone to E.

In the 1950s, double-valve instruments were being custom-built for American orchestral players, and the designs were soon adopted by American manufacturers. In 1961, Vincent Bach released their double-valve "50B2" model with a second dependent E valve (later built in E♭ and D) based on an instrument modified in 1956 for the bass trombonist with Minneapolis Symphony. In the late 1960s, instruments were custom-built using a second independent valve that lowered the instrument to G, and to E♭ when engaged together with the first valve. The first commercial model with this valve configuration was also introduced by Olds, in 1973. Although new to the bass trombone, the idea of two independent valves was anticipated in Germany in the 1920s by Ernst Dehmel's contrabass trombone in F.

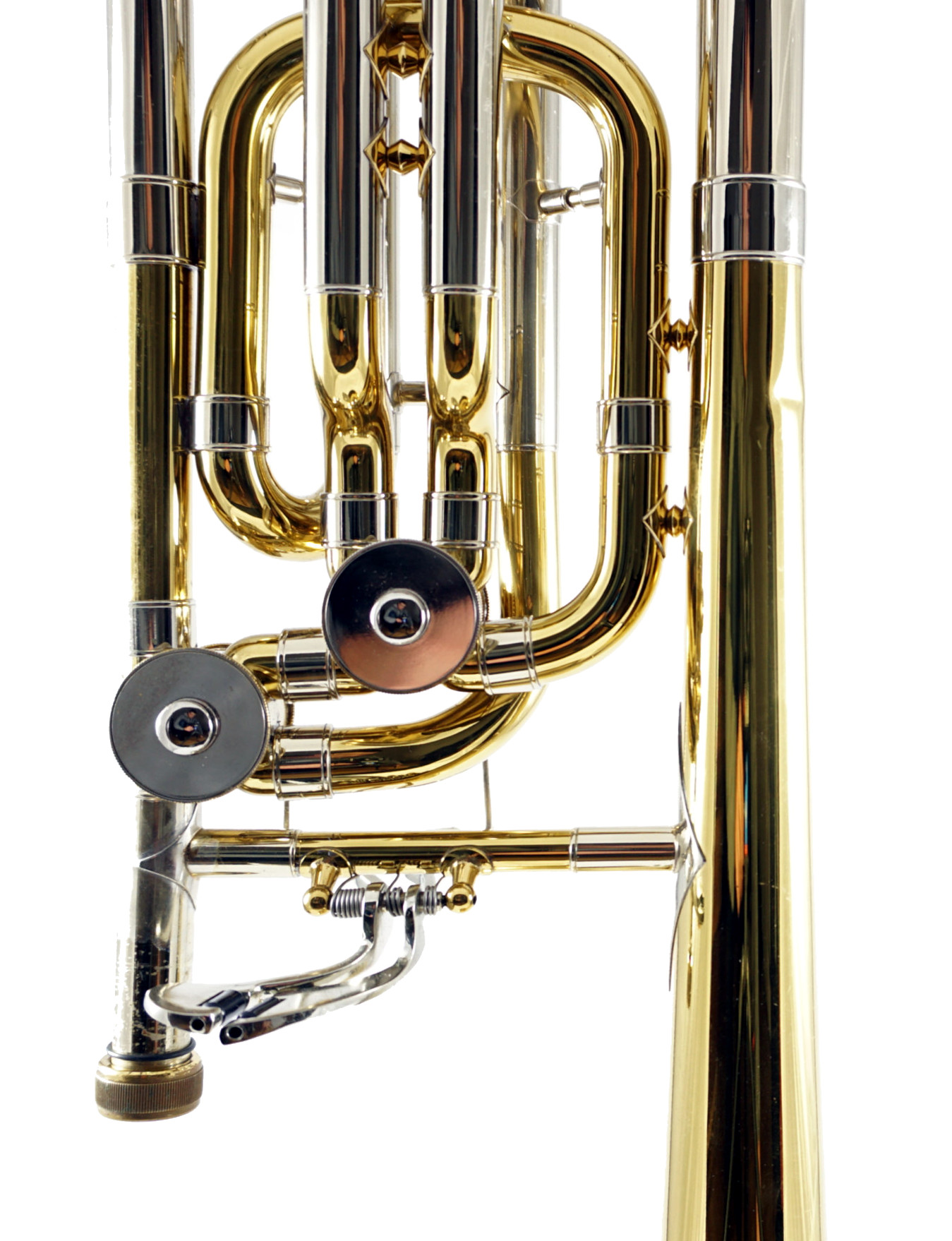
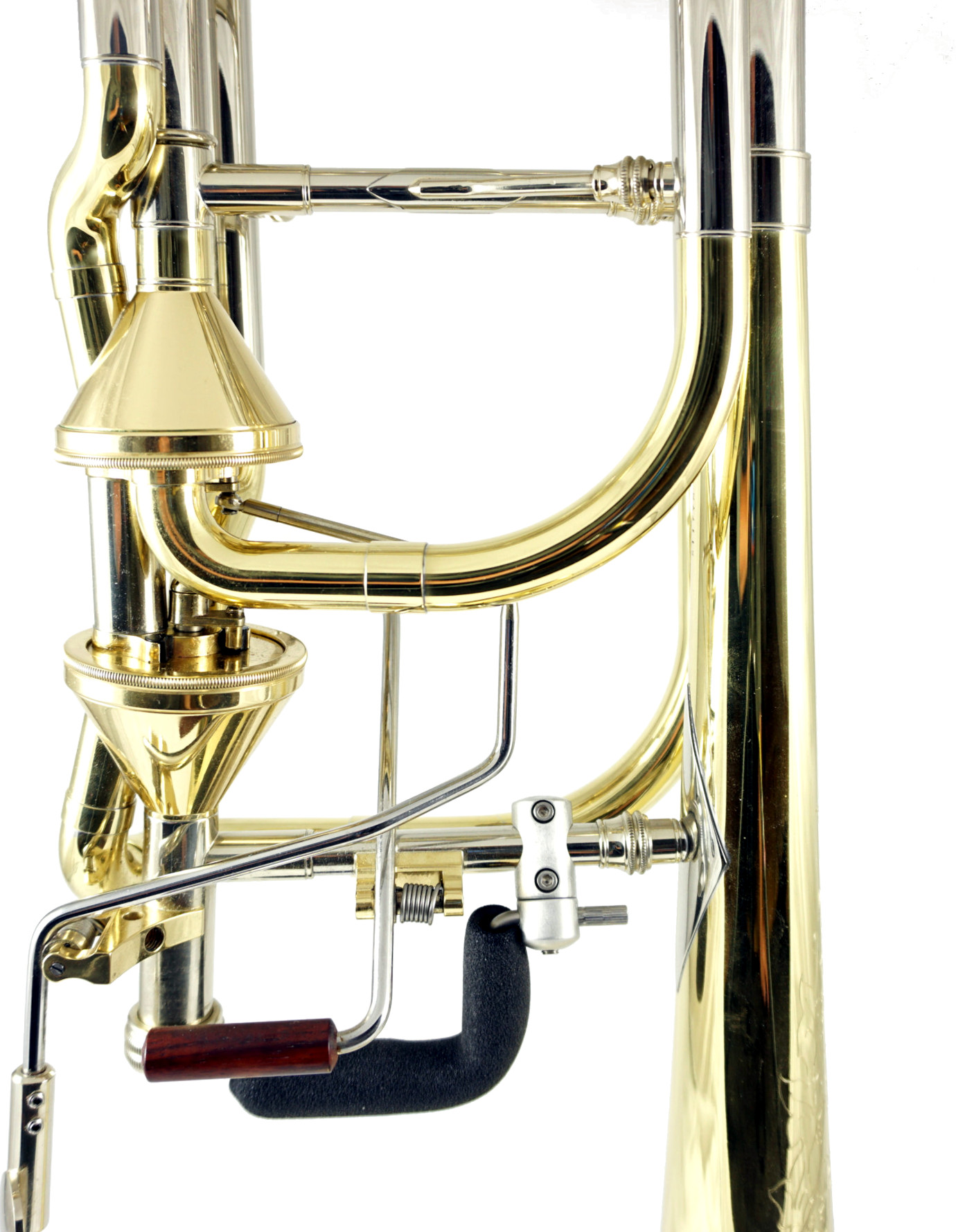
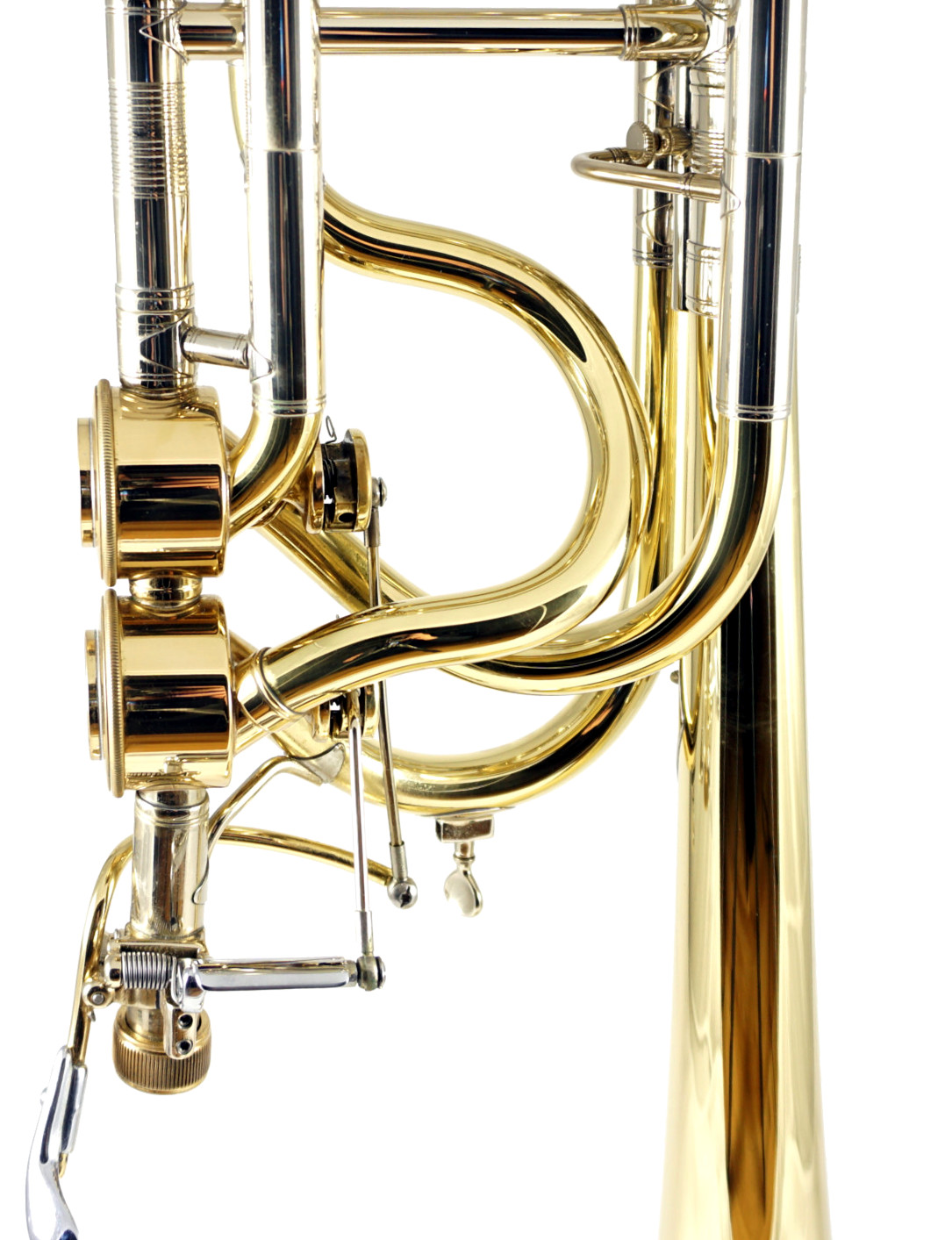
Bass trombones with two valves. Dependent standard rotary valves, left; independent Thayer axial flow valves, center; independent Hagmann valves, right.

The early 1980s saw the emergence of the axial flow valve, known as the "Thayer" valve in America after its inventor, Orla Thayer. Trombonists frequently cite its more free-blowing, open-feeling playing characteristics and sound. It was gradually adopted on high-end trombone models from US manufacturers by the 1990s, particularly from Edwards, Bach, and Shires, and sparked further innovation in free-blowing valves. Conn patented its own CL2000 valve, developed with Swedish trombonist Christian Lindberg, and the Swiss Hagmann valve was adopted by European manufacturers.

== Construction ==
The modern bass trombone uses the same 9-foot (2.7 m) length of tubing as the tenor trombone, but with a wider bore, a larger bell, and a larger mouthpiece which facilitate playing in the low register. Typical specifications are a bore size of 0.562 inches (14.3 mm) in the slide with a bell from 9 to 10 1/2 inches (23 to 27 cm) in diameter.

=== Dependent and independent valves ===
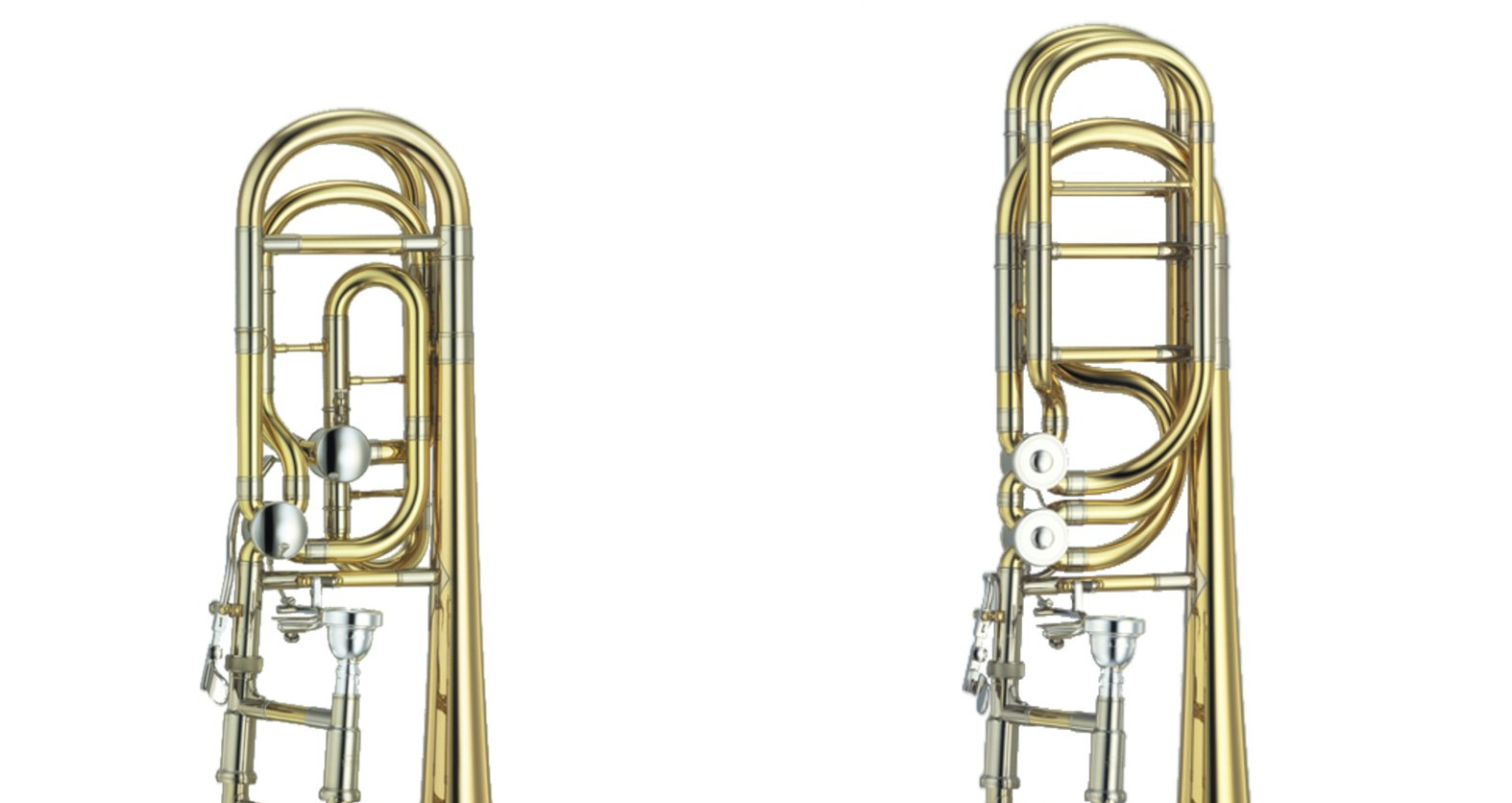
Dependent (left) and independent valves (right) on the modern bass trombone

The bass trombone has typically two valves that lower the pitch of the instrument when engaged, to facilitate the register between the B♭_{1} pedal in first position and the E_{2} second partial in seventh. The first valve lowers the key of the instrument a fourth to F. The second (when engaged with the first) will lower the instrument to D (or less commonly, E♭).

The second valve can be configured in one of two ways, either dependent on, or independent of, the first. In a dependent system, also known as stacked or off-line, the second valve is fitted to the tubing of the first valve, and can only be engaged in combination with the first. In an independent system, also known as in-line, the second valve is fitted to the main tubing next to the first valve, and can be used independently. The second independent valve typically lowers the instrument to G♭ on its own, and to D when engaged with the first valve. Less commonly the second valve is tuned to G (combining to give E♭), or has a tuning slide that can tune the valve to either G or G♭ as desired.

=== Single-valve instruments ===
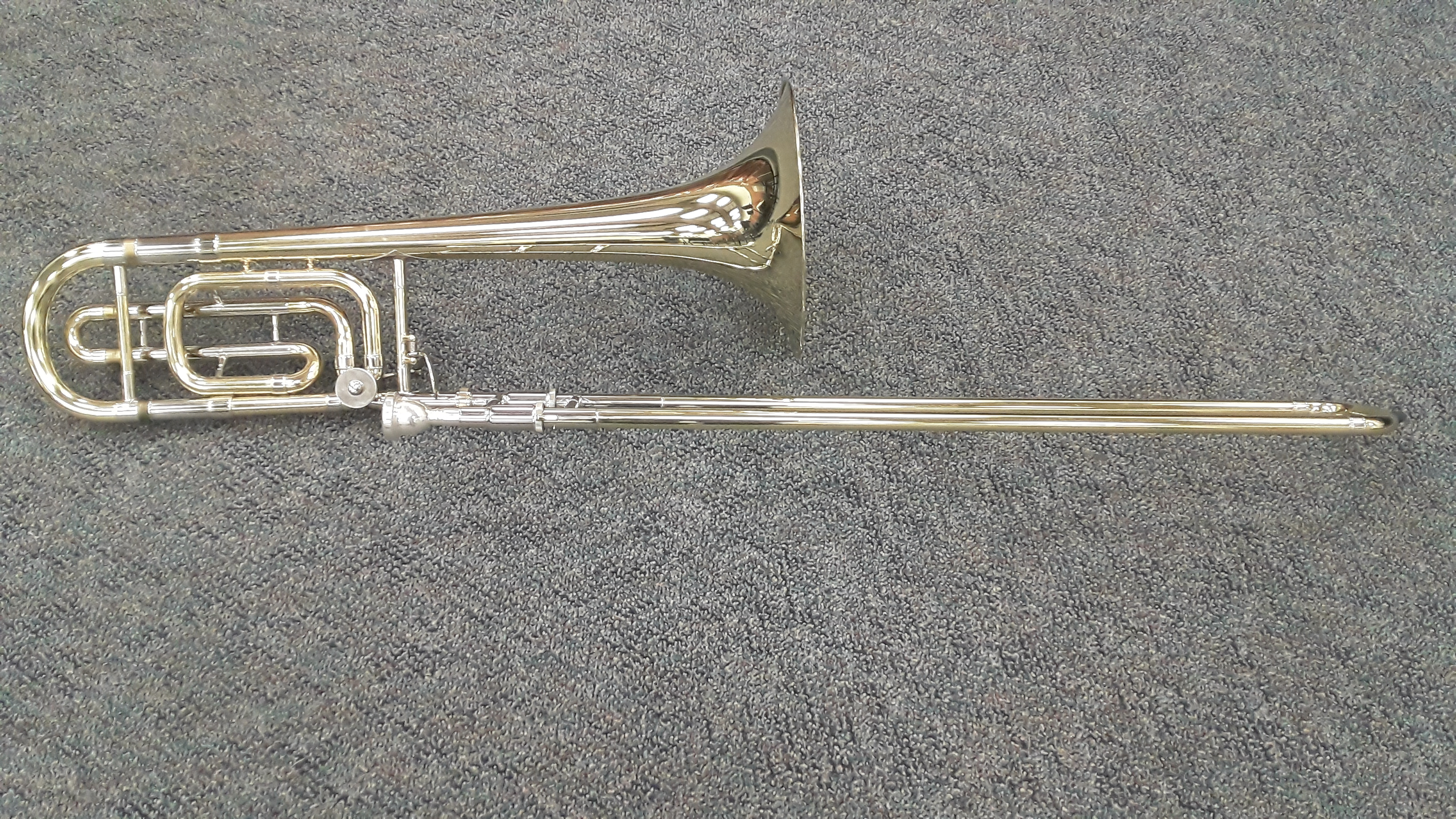
A single-valve bass trombone in B♭/F

Before the appearance of double valve models in the mid-20th century, bass trombones in B♭ had one valve in F. On such an instrument with a standard slide, the low B_{1} note immediately above the pedal range is unobtainable. To solve this, bass trombones from the 19th and early 20th century were sometimes made with a valve attachment in E rather than F, or with an alternative tuning slide to lower the pitch to E♭. Today, single-valve bass trombones have a tuning slide on the valve section that is long enough to enable access to the low B_{1} by lowering the pitch from F to E.

== Range ==
Range of the modern bass trombone.

The range of the modern bass trombone with two valves is fully chromatic from the lowest pedal B♭_{0} with both valves engaged (or even A_{0} with valve slides extended), up to at least B♭_{4}. Although much of the established orchestral repertoire infrequently strays below B♭_{1} or above G_{4}, and is typically written in the lower registers, there are some exceptions. French composers in the 19th century and early 20th century wrote third trombone parts for tenor trombone, writing as high as A_{4} (Bizet L'Arlésienne, Franck Symphony in D minor), and omitting notes below E_{2} except for occasional pedal notes (Berlioz in the 1830s used pedal B♭_{1} and A_{1} in Symphonie fantastique, and G♯_{1} in his Grande Messe des morts). English composers in the same period were writing for a bass trombone in G, and avoided writing below D♭_{2}, even though instruments were made with a valve attachment in D by around 1900.

The 20th century saw further extensions of the bass trombone range, such as the fortissimo pedal D_{1} in Berg's Drei Orchesterstücke (1915), and the high B_{4} in Kodály's 1927 Háry János suite. Contemporary orchestral and solo classical pieces, as well as modern jazz arrangements, often further exploit the wide tonal range of the bass trombone.

== Repertoire ==
Since the Romantic period, the trombone section of an orchestra, wind ensemble, or British-style brass band usually consists of two tenor trombones and at least one bass trombone. In a modern jazz big band section of typically four trombones, the lowest part is usually intended for bass trombone, often serving as the anchor of the trombone section or doubling the double bass and baritone saxophone.

George Roberts was one of the first players to champion the solo possibilities of the instrument, through his big band and commercial orchestra career in the 1940s-70s. One of the first major classical solo works for the instrument was the Concerto for Bass Trombone by Thom Ritter George.

== Images ==
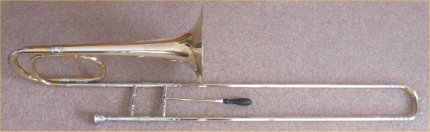
Bass trombone in F

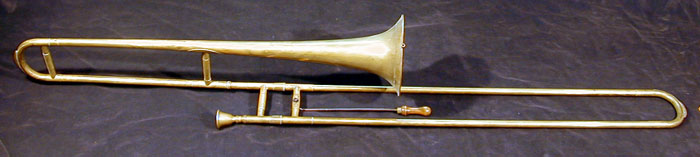
Bass trombone in E♭

== Bibliography ==
- Praetorius, Michael (1620). Syntagma Musicum. II, De Organographia: Parts I and II. Early Music Series. Translated by Crookes, David Z. Oxford University Press. ISBN 978-0-19-816260-5. OCLC 24613416. OL 16702850M. Wikidata Q126794034.
- Guion, David M. (2010). A History of the Trombone. Toronto: The Scarecrow Press. ISBN 978-0-8108-7445-9. LCCN 2010000846. OCLC 725775517. OL 24019524M. Wikidata Q111039945.
- Herbert, Trevor, ed. (2000). The British Brass Band: A Musical and Social History. Oxford University Press. ISBN 978-0-19-159012-2. OCLC 51682765. Wikidata Q116480763.
- Herbert, Trevor (2006). The Trombone. Yale Musical Instrument Series. New Haven: Yale University Press. ISBN 978-0-300-23575-3. OCLC 1007305405. OL 30593699M. Wikidata Q111039091.
- Herbert, Trevor; Myers, Arnold; Wallace, John, eds. (2019). The Cambridge Encyclopedia of Brass Instruments. Cambridge University Press. doi:10.1017/9781316841273. ISBN 978-1-316-63185-0. OL 34730943M. Wikidata Q136027509.
- Yeo, Douglas (2017). The One Hundred Essential Works for the Symphonic Bass Trombonist. Maple City: Encore Music Publishers. ISBN 978-1-5323-3145-9. OCLC 982957903. OL 47303018M. Wikidata Q111957781.
- Yeo, Douglas (2021). An Illustrated Dictionary for the Modern Trombone, Tuba, and Euphonium Player. Dictionaries for the Modern Musician. Illustrator: Lennie Peterson. Lanham: Rowman & Littlefield. ISBN 978-1-5381-5966-8. LCCN 2021020757. OCLC 1249799159. OL 34132790M. Wikidata Q111040546.
