= Hagmann =

Hagmann is a German surname. Notable people with the surname include:

- Fritz Hagmann (1901–1974), Swiss sport wrestler
- Marcel Hagmann (born 1983), German footballer
- Robert Hagmann (born 1942), Swiss racing cyclist
- Sarah Hagmann (born 1985), German politician
- Stuart Hagmann (born 1942), American film and television director
- Thomas Hagmann (born 1953), Swiss judoka

== See also ==
- Hagman
- Hagmann valve, a brass instrument valve
