= Christian Friedrich Sattler =

German brass instrument maker (1778–1842)

Christian Friedrich Sattler (1778–1842) was a brass instrument maker and inventor in Leipzig, Kingdom of Saxony. In 1821, Sattler became renowned for two inventions: the chromatic valve trumpet which applied three valves to the natural trumpet to provide a fully chromatic range for the first time, and the Tenorbaßposaune (lit. 'tenor-bass trombone'). A tenor trombone in B♭ with the larger bore and mouthpiece of a bass trombone in F, he improved it further in 1839 by inventing the quartventil (lit. 'fourth valve'), a valve attachment to lower the instrument a fourth into F to provide the lower range available to the bass trombone. In Sattler's workshop in the Querstraße in Leipzig he built "signal horns and chromatic valve horns", new inventions at the time. He also built his own design of trombones with a wider bell flare and larger bore, that were widely adopted by players and other instrument makers, notably Czech maker Červený. Today, they are still known as "Leipzig model" or "German" trombones.
