= Axial flow valve =

Type of brass instrument valve

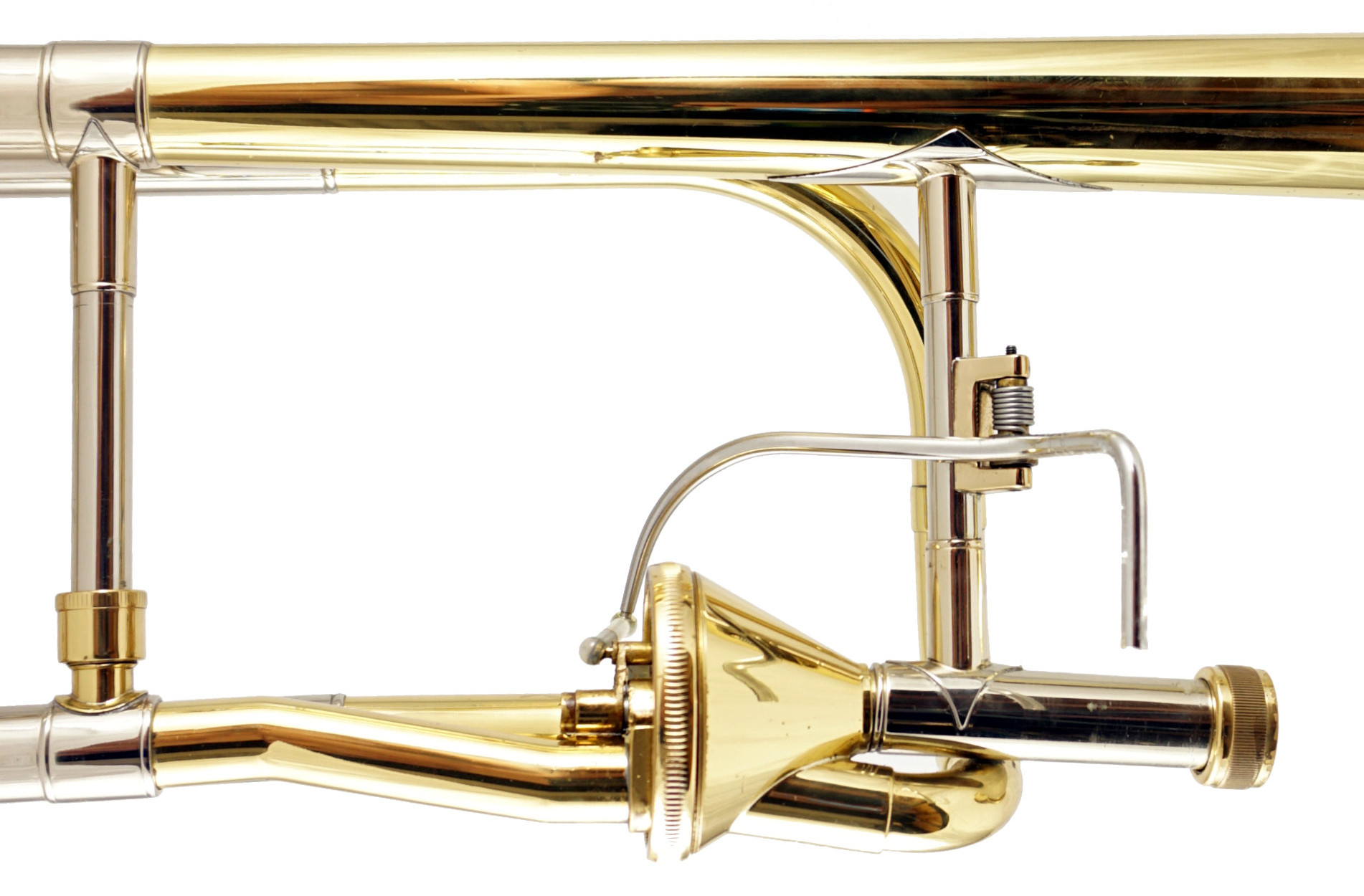
Thayer axial flow valve on a tenor trombone

The axial flow valve, or Thayer valve, is a brass instrument valve design patented in 1978 by American inventor Orla Ed Thayer. Designed with assistance from instrument maker Zigmant Kanstul, it was originally intended to replace the traditional rotary valve on the French horn, but instead revolutionized the design of trombone valve attachments. Combined with open-wrap tubing, it eliminates the impedance caused by tight tubing bends, improving the airflow through the instrument and the open "feel" perceived by the player.

== Problem ==
Rotary valve in default (A) and engaged (B) positions. The airflow from mouthpiece (1) to bell (2) passes through two 90° bends when diverted through the valve ports or "knuckles" (6) into the valve tubing (3); 4. valve casing; 5. internal rotor; 7. rotor spindle.

When engaged, a rotary valve deflects the air flow through extra valve tubing, using tight, small radius bends of at least 90° angles, leading to a stuffy response and audible tone colour changes, compared to the "open" instrument. These drawbacks are especially noticeable on the trombone, since its characteristic timbre results directly from its cylindrical bore and almost straight construction with only two bends (not counting the valve tubing). In contrast, the distinctly softer sound of other brass instrument families like the horns, saxhorns, and tubas is at least partially a result of their conical bore and their intricate construction with many bows and bends.

The change in timbre and response in the valve section was also made more pronounced by the wrap of the valve tubing, traditionally in several tight loops to fit the length of tubing within the bell section, that was the norm until the 1980s.

== Invention ==
Axial flow valve in default (A) and engaged (B) positions. 1. airflow, from mouthpiece; 2. airflow, to bell; 3. valve tubing; 4. valve casing; 5. conical rotor; 6. input (a) and return (b) valve ports; 7. spindle axis of rotation.

The Thayer Valve uses a conical rotor (although the 1978 patent and early prototypes were cylindrical), with its spindle rotation axis parallel to the incoming and outgoing tubing. The airflow undergoes a maximum of 28° of deflection through the valve, which makes an F attachment's open-wrap tubing even more efficient. As a result, the response, tone colour and other playing characteristics are nearly unchanged from those of the open instrument, even on bass trombones with two independent valves fitted.

=== Criticism ===
There were several problems with early Thayer valve designs, noted by players and instrument repairers.

Valves sometimes suffered from galvanic corrosion due to the use of unsuitable metals in the manufacture of different parts of the valve. Early valves used cast brass for the rotors, which made them heavy and slow to actuate; an initial solution to this problem was to use aluminium and other metal alloys for the rotor to try to reduce its mass.

The conical rotor's spindle was only anchored at the wide end of the cone, the other end free to rotate inside the casing. This "floating" tip of the conical rotor would undergo precession or "wobble", which caused wear where it meets the inside of the valve casing, becoming loose as a result, and leading to further problems such as air leaks and lubricant loss. Thus, the Thayer valve can have higher cleaning, maintenance and lubrication requirements than other valve designs. They can also be more difficult to disassemble and clean than a standard rotary valve, especially on double-valve bass trombones.

Some players, especially bass trombonists, claim that more resistance enhances the response of low notes on the valve side (below E♭). This group finds playing open flowing designs like the axial flow valve to be more of a strain.

=== Evolution and improvement ===
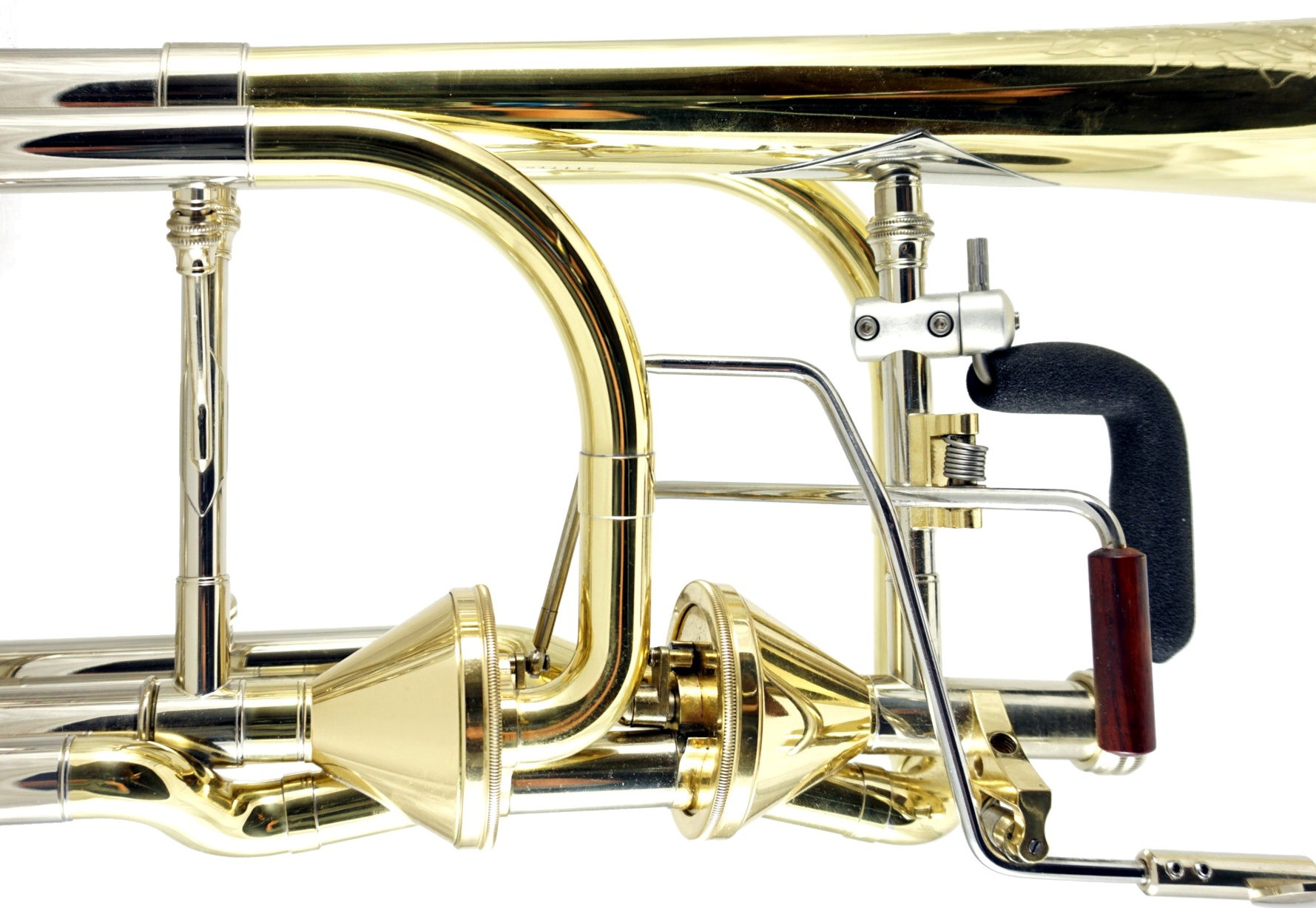
Two independent axial flow valves on a Shires bass trombone

Thayer filed several further patents in the 1980s which attempted to solve some of the initial design problems, as well as other innovations to reduce costs of manufacture and improve the speed of action. These involved using spring tensioners to hold the rotor against the casing to prevent air leaks, and using materials such as plastic or Teflon for the rotor, to reduce its mass and prevent corrosion issues.

Cristian Bosc, Italian brass instrument maker, has improved the axial flow valve design by fabricating both the rotor and the valve casing from single pieces of solid brass with no soldered parts. This was to address leakage and corrosion problems.

A 2011 patent granted to Michael Olsen of Instrument Innovations also greatly improved the valve by (among other things) mounting bearings at both ends of the rotor spindle. This increased the speed and reliability of the action, and eliminated the "floating rotor" design problem and its associated wear and precession issues. Vincent Bach use this design for their "Infinity Valve" on their "AF" trombones, which replaced their "T" trombones that used the older Thayer design.

== Aftermath ==
The invention of the Thayer Valve kicked off an "arms race" among trombone designers and manufacturers that continues today. Newer valve designs include the relatively successful Swiss Hagmann valve found on trombones from many European manufacturers, the Christian Lindberg valve from Conn, and the S.E. Shires Tru-Bore valve. Less successful designs included the Bach Balanced Valve or "K" valve from Vincent Bach in the 1990s, the Miller valve, and the Yamaha "V" valve.

This activity has also spurred many patents and refinements in traditional rotary valve designs for other instruments as well as trombones, such as the Willson Rotax valves found on many French horns and tubas, the Lätzsch "Full Flow" valve, the Greenhoe valve, and the Courtois "ICON" valve.

== See also ==
- Brass instrument valve
- Hagmann valve
