= Hagman =

Hagman is a Swedish surname. Notable people with the surname include:

- Carl Hagman (1890–1949), Swedish actor
- Emy Hagman (1906–1976), Swedish actress
- Itai Hagman (born 1983), Argentine politician
- Justus Hagman (1859–1936), Swedish actor
- Larry Hagman (1931–2012), American actor
- Matti Hagman (1955–2016), Finnish ice hockey player
- Mia Hagman (born 1979), Finnish breaststroke swimmer
- Nathalie Hagman (born 1990), Swedish handball player
- Niklas Hagman (born 1979), Finnish ice hockey player, son of Matti
- Sofia Hagman (1942–1900), Finnish educator
- Sophie Hagman (1758–1826), Swedish ballet dancer

== Fictional ==
- Daniel Hagman, a character in the Sharpe novel series

== See also ==
- Hagmann
