= Rotary valve =

Valve where rotation of passages in a plug controls flow direction

A rotary valve in default (A) and engaged (B) positions. 1. input airflow; 2. output airflow; 3. valve tubing; 4. valve casing; 5. internal rotor; 6. valve ports, or "knuckles"; 7. rotor spindle.

A rotary valve (also called rotary-motion valve) is a type of valve in which the rotation of a passage or passages in a transverse plug regulates the flow of liquid, gas or dry bulk products through the attached pipes. The common stopcock is the simplest form of rotary valve. Rotary valves have been applied in numerous applications, including:

- Changing the pitch of brass instruments.
- Controlling the steam and exhaust ports of steam engines, most notably in the Corliss steam engine.
- Periodically reversing the flow of air and fuel across the open hearth furnace.
- Loading sample on chromatography columns.
- Certain types of two-stroke and four-stroke engines.
- Most hydraulic automotive power steering control valves.

== Use in brass instruments ==
Rotary valve for a double horn

In the context of brass musical instruments, rotary valves are found on horns, trumpets, trombones, flugelhorns, and tubas. The cornet derived from the posthorn, by applying rotary valves to it in the 1820s in France. An alternative to a rotary valve instrument is the more common piston valve trumpet. However, many European trumpet players tend to favor rotary valves.

Trombone F attachment valves are usually rotary, with several variations on the basic design also in use, such as the Thayer axial flow valve and the Hagmann valve.

The rotary valve was first applied to the horn in 1824 by Nathan Adams (1783–1864) of Boston and patented in 1835 by Joseph Riedl.

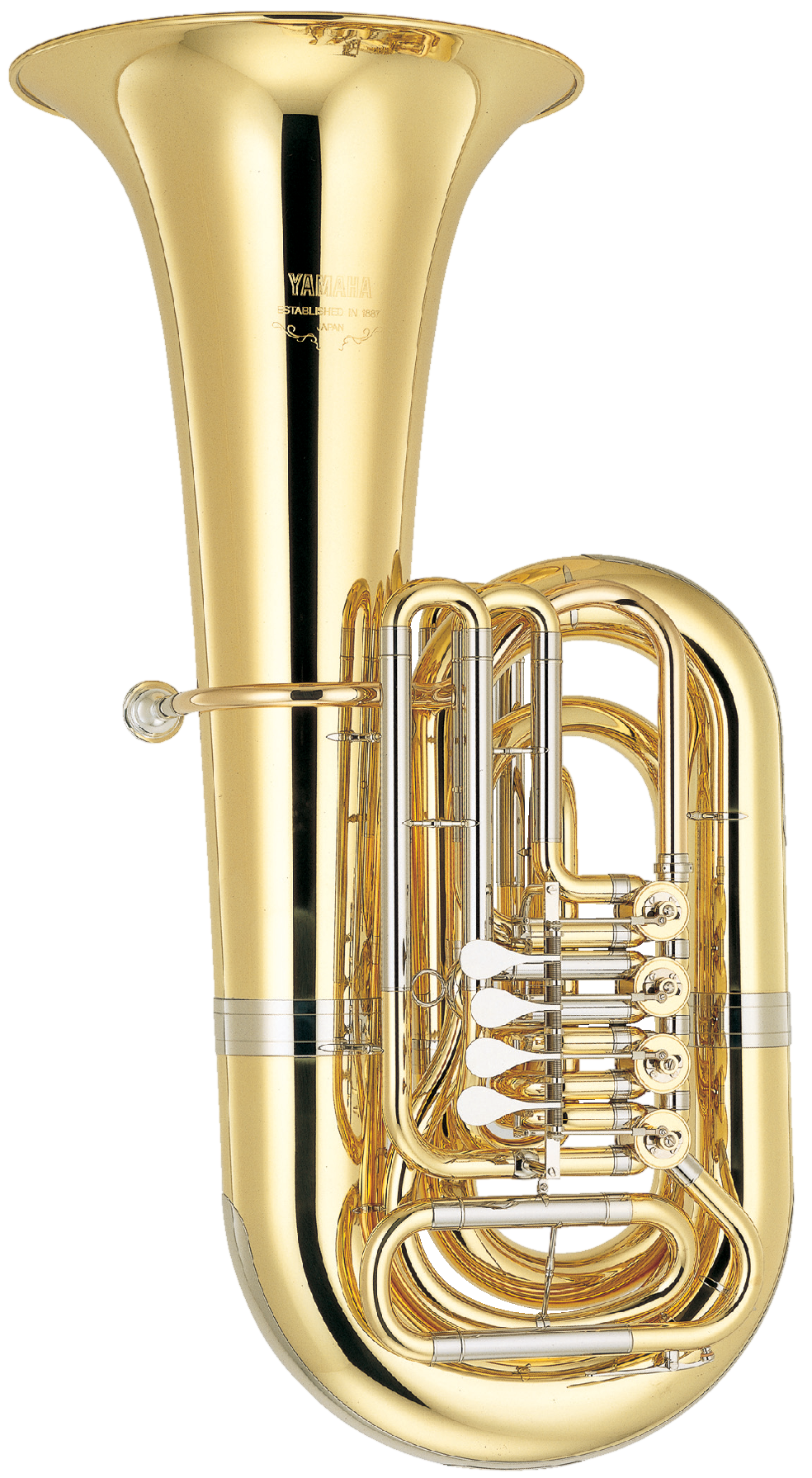
Tuba with 4 rotary valves, by Yamaha

== Use in industry ==
Rotary valves for industrial manufacturing are often used in bulk material handling, dust collection or pneumatic conveying systems, depending on the application. The valve is used to regulate the flow of a product or material by maintaining a consistent flow rate suited to the process. Controlling the flow of material helps to prevent issues such as jamming, material leakage and damage to the valve itself. Typical applications are for feeding a weighed hopper or for feeding a mill that can be clogged by the product.

Valves are part of the material exchange process and work in metering or feeding applications, function as rotary airlocks, or provide a combination of airlock and metering functions.

A rotary valve in the pharmaceutical, chemical and food industry is used to dose and feed solid bulk products within the processes. Valves are also commonly used in construction, plastics, recycling, agriculture and forestry, or wherever material needs to be safely and efficiently conveyed from one point to another.

An airlock-type rotary valve receives and dispenses material from two chambers with different pressure levels. They seal air flow between the valve's inlet and outlet to maintain a consistent pressure differential, which promotes efficient material flow. The valve's pressurized chamber prevents foreign material from infiltrating the housing and keeps conveyed material from escaping the system.

== Use in engine design ==
=== Four-stroke engines ===
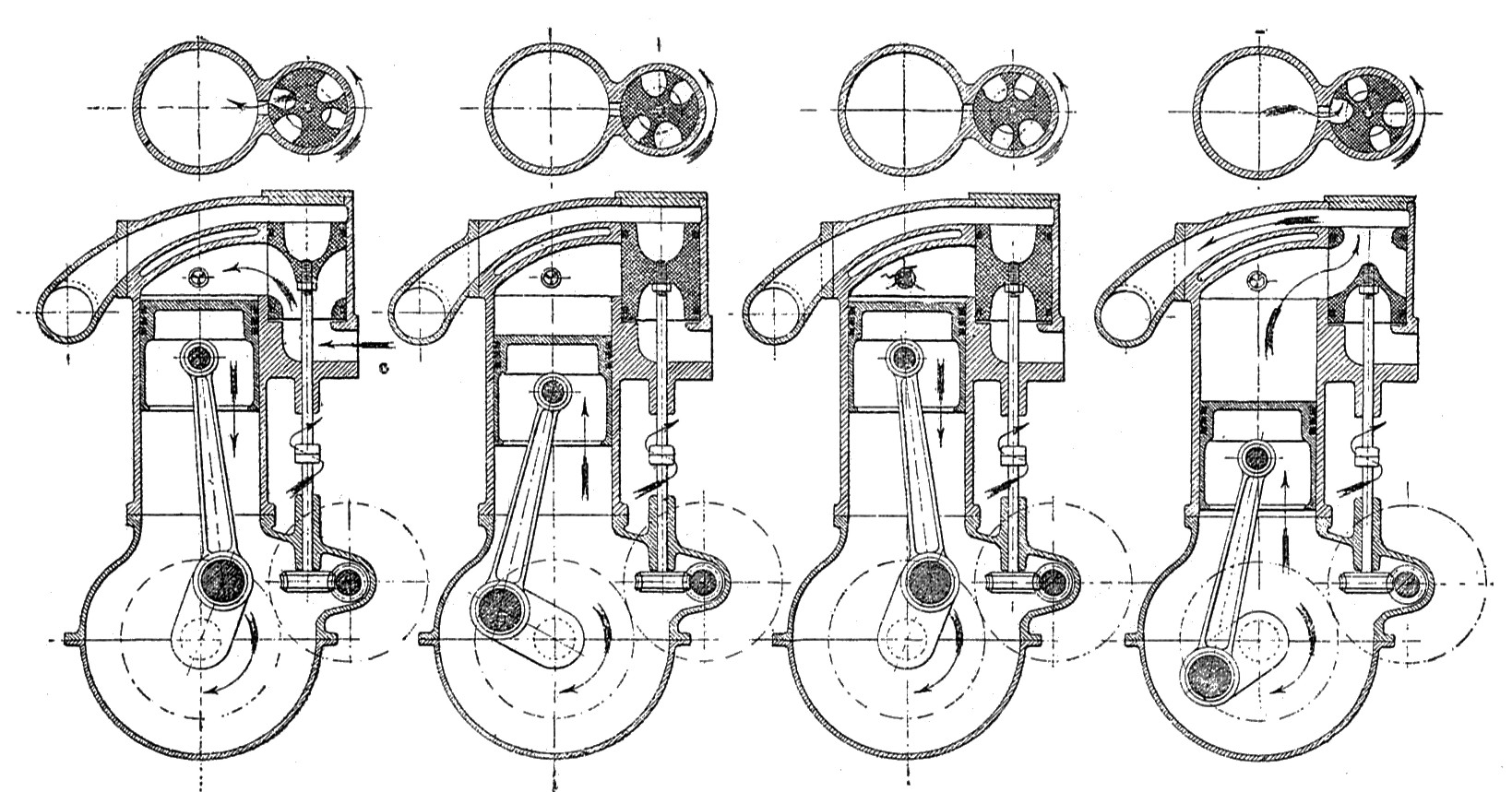
Itala rotary valve engine (1912).

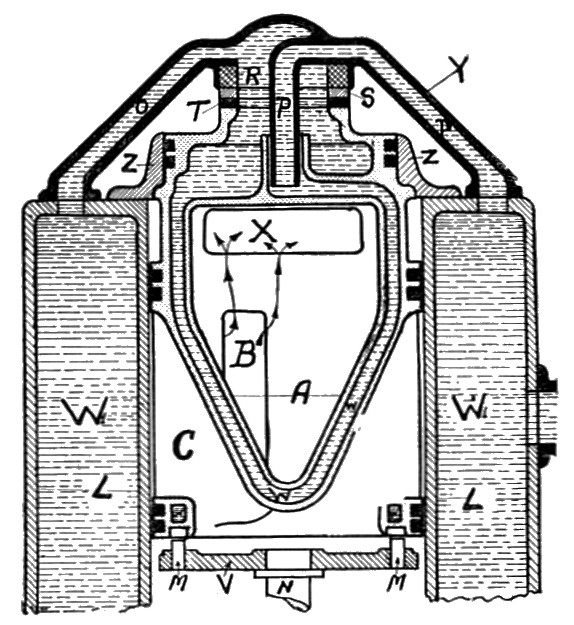
Italarotary valve cooling (1919).

Darracq rotary-valve engine (c. 1919)

The general adoption of rotary valves in the place of poppet valves in combustion engines was prevented by the issue of sealing. Poppet valves have a seal around the tapered flange of the opening, and this seal improves with increased working pressure in the combustion chamber because the pressure forces the valve shut. In contrast, rotary valves have to move freely to operate and need to be lubricated with oil, causing issues with holding pressures of up to 100 bar at temperatures of 1000 degrees Celsius, with the related thermal expansion of the various seals and valve barrel. This valve expansion causes misalignment in the valve-to-seal interface as an engine moves from room temperature to full operating temperature. If the seals are pressed against the valve with higher pressure to accommodate this expansion, high friction and power loss occurs, plus high rates of wear.

The rotary valve combustion engine possesses several significant advantages over the conventional assemblies, including significantly higher compression ratios and rpm, meaning more power, a much more compact and light-weight cylinder head, and reduced complexity, meaning higher reliability and lower cost. As inlet and exhaust are usually combined, special attention should be given to valve cooling to avoid engine knocking.

Rotary valves have been used in several different engine designs. R.A. Reynolds got a patent: US 1002756, 1911, for a Disc Rotary Valve in a 4-Stroke engine. Concept had a remake by Felix Wankel, a self-taught tightness specialist, never had an engineer diploma, neither a driver's license, for the Torpedo engine Jumo KM-8. Itala (company) succeeded in a different type of Rotary Valve. In Britain, the National Engine Company Ltd advertised its rotary valve engine for use in early aircraft, at a time when poppet valves were prone to failure by sticking or burning.

In the end of 1930s, Frank Aspin developed a design with a rotary valve that rotated on the same axis as the cylinder bore, but with limited success.

US company Coates International Ltd has developed a spherical rotary valve for internal combustion engines which replaces the poppet valve system. This particular design is four-stroke, with the rotary valves operated by overhead shafts in lieu of overhead camshafts (i.e. in line with a bank of cylinders). The first sale of such an engine was part of a natural gas engine-generator.

Rotary valves are potentially highly suitable for high-revving engines, such as those used in racing sportscars and F1 racing cars, on which traditional poppet valves with springs can fail due to valve float and spring resonance and where the desmodromic valve gear is too heavy, large in size and too complex to time and design properly. Rotary valves could allow for a more compact and lightweight cylinder head design. They rotate at half engine speed (or one quarter) and lack the inertia forces of reciprocating valve mechanisms. This allows for higher engine speeds, offering approximately perhaps 10% more power. The 1980s MGN W12 F1 engine used rotary valves but never raced. Between 2002 and 2004 the Australian developer Bishop Innovation and Mercedes-Ilmor tested rotary valves for a F1 V10 engine.

Bishop Innovations' patent for the rotary valve engine was bought out by BRV Pty Ltd, owned by Tony Wallis, one of the valves original designers. BRV has constructed several functional motors using the rotary valve technology, such as a Honda CRF 450, which had greater torque at both low (17% increase) and high (9% increase) engine speeds, and also produced more brake horsepower up to around 30% more at functional engine speeds. The engine was also considerably smaller and lighter, as the cylinder head assembly was not as large.

A company in the UK called Roton Engine Developments made some progress in 2005 with a two-rotor (one for inlet and one for exhaust) single-cylinder Husaberg motorcycle engine. They filed patents and got an example running in 2006, but were backed by MG Rover which subsequently went bust, leaving Roton without enough funds to continue. The designs surfaced some years later in Australia with Engine Developments Australia Pty Ltd. A prototype casting was produced in 2013 on a Kawasaki Ninja 300 parallel twin unit. This unit is still in development phase at the time of writing but is significant as it has the potential to run much higher compression ratios than even other rotary valve engines due to a significant but undisclosed new cooling method of the combustion chamber and the ability to eliminate the throttle completely, making it vastly more economical at lower engine speeds, so it is claimed.

A proven automotive rotary valve engine was developed by Ralph Ogden Watson of Auckland New Zealand, during 1989. Since its inception, the car with the rotary valve has covered many trouble-free miles and remains in use.

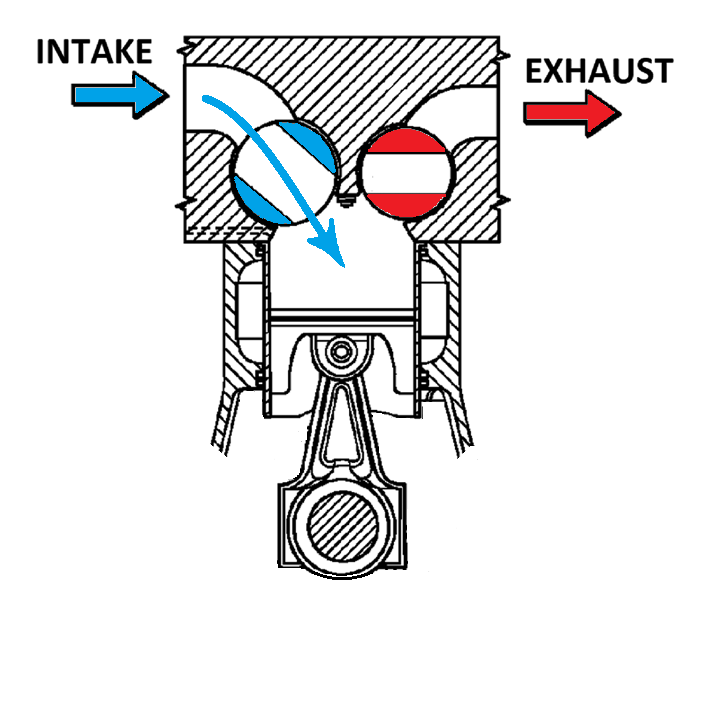
ASME of the VAZTEC rotary valve concept with twin valves

A U.S. company named VAZTEC has created a compliant rotary valve sealing system that solves the friction and sealing problems of previous designs. They have built ten prototype engines from a 5.3L V-8 to a handheld 28cc four stroke. VAZTEC has also built a successful Diesel engine that contained the high compression pressures of a compression ignition engine (20:1 compression ratio, 100 bar combustion pressure). They are working with various OE manufacturers to commercialize their design. Various patents cover the compliant seal, including U.S. Patent 9,903,239. A Computational Fluid Dynamics (CFD) model of the VAZTEC rotary valve can be viewed at this link.

=== Two-stroke engines ===
A rotary valve in the form of a flat disc, also known as a disc valve, is used in two-stroke motorcycle engines, where the arrangement helps to prevent reverse flow back into the intake port during the compression stroke. Austrian engine manufacturer Rotax used rotary intake valves in their now out-of-production 64 hp (48 kW) Rotax 532 two-stroke engine design and continues to use rotary intake valves in the 532's successor, the current-production 64 hp (48 kW) Rotax 582. Wifredo Ricart, a Spanish engineer who worked at Alfa Romeo and then in Pegaso, who had applied for the 'Desmodromic' valve drive system in 1924, patent FR590149; patented, ES166367, 1944, a Rotary Valve for 2-Strokes; also an Itala type of Valve, patent ES0117737. Lotus tried something similar, SAE technical paper 920779.

== Use in production engines ==
UK company RCV Engines Ltd uses rotating cylinder liner technology as a specialized form of rotary valve in some of their four-stroke model engine and small-engine line-up. RCV also use horizontal and vertical rotary valves in four-stroke engines in their current range of engines. Piccard-Pictet in Switzerland patented a Rotary Valve, GB118407, basically a turning cylinder liner, different to Burt-McCollum Single Sleeve valve that both oscilates and turns, in an ellipsoid way

RCV have developed a 125cc rotating cylinder liner engine, incorporating a rotating valve in the cylinder liner, for scooter applications. PGO Scooters of Taiwan were working with RCV in developing the engine for their applications.

The Suzuki RG500 "Gamma" was powered by a two-stroke, rotary valve, twin crank, square four engine displacing 498 cubic centimeters. The power output was 93.7 brake horsepower (69.9 kW) at 9,500 RPM.

== Use in chromatography ==
Rotary valves are used for loading samples on columns used for liquid or gas chromatography. The valves used in these methods are usually 6-port, 2-position rotary valves.

== See also ==
- Airlock
- Itala cars
- Piston valve
- Poppet valve
- Rotary feeder
- Slide valve
