= Hagmann valve =

Type of brass instrument valve

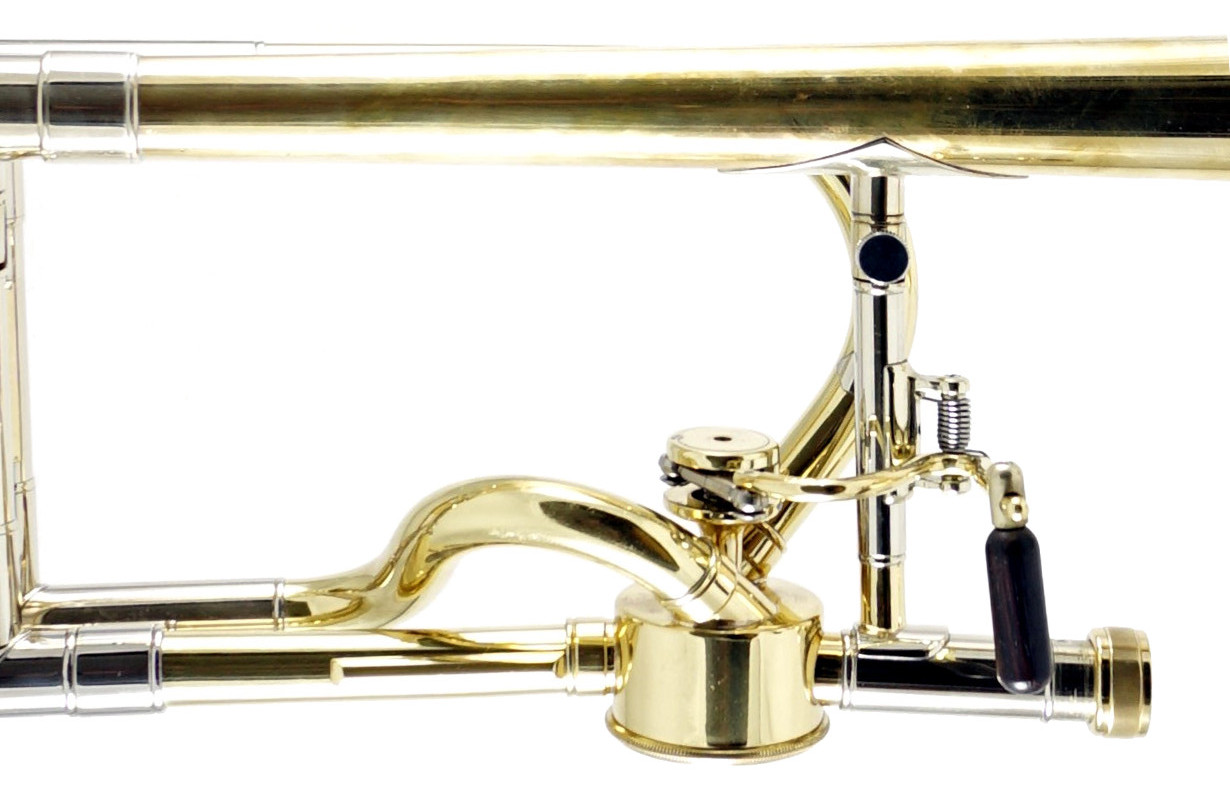
Hagmann valve on a tenor trombone

The Hagmann Free-Flow Valve is a trademarked brass instrument valve design developed by Swiss musician and instrument technician René Hagmann, first introduced for trombone F attachments in 1990. His intention was to address some of the geometrical limitations of the regular rotary valve, as well as the reliability and maintenance issues of the popular Thayer axial flow valve that arise from its relatively complex design.

== Construction ==
Hagmann valve, in default (A) and engaged (B) positions, top (above) and side view (below). 1. air flow, from mouthpiece; 2. air flow, to bell; 3. air flow to and from valve tubing; 4. valve casing; 5. valve cap; 6. straight-path valve port; 7. valve ports, to tubing emerging at the top of the valve casing; 8. spindle axis of rotation. Source: Figs. 1A–1E (prior art), Shires Tru-Bore patent.

A standard rotary valve has a rotor with two valve ports, which deflect the air flow through a 90° turn when engaged. While this does not substantially affect the sound of instruments like the French horn or tuba, which already have many sharp bends in the tubing, the characteristic sound of the trombone is partly due to its long straight air flow. The valve ports in rotary valves require a small radius 90° bend or "knuckle" shape. This causes increased acoustic impedance, and therefore frequency dampening effects of some harmonics, depending on the location of the valve. This is particular the case in higher overtones/harmonics with shorter wavelengths relative to the diameter of the tubing and relative to the radius of the bend. This can result in a modest change in tonal quality when the valve is engaged. In the case of trombones this can result in a less crisp and more muted or mellow sound. Moreover, because of the use of the slide alters the relative location of the valve compared to the total length of the instrument, different slide positions may produce slightly different tonal quality when the valve is engaged compared to a standard trombone without valves. Sharps bends also cause flow turbulence which absorbs energy, meaning more effort and breath support is needed by the player for a given volume. Some rotors add further impedance by using a smaller diameter than the instrument tubing, or an elliptical cross-section, to reduce the size and weight of the valve, for the sake of fast operation and comfort.

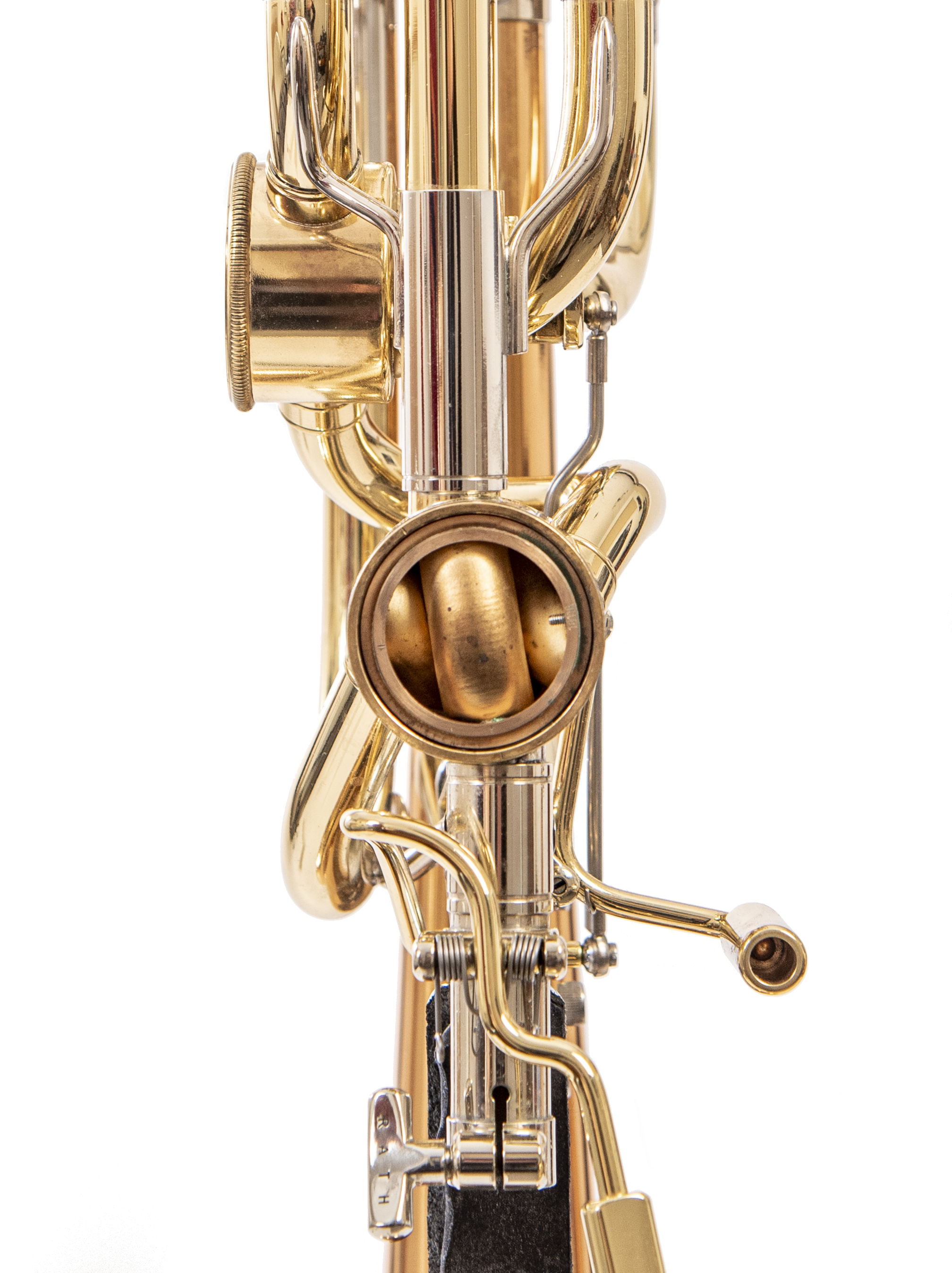
End cap removed, showing valve port layout

The Hagmann valve has a rotor with three ports. The default path uses one port, which passes straight through the center of the rotor with almost no deflection of the air flow. When engaged, the rotor turns only 60° and uses the other two ports to deflect the air path approximately 45° through the top of the rotor and into the valve tubing. This reduces acoustic impedance effects, providing a more open "feel" for the player and a "crisper" tone more similar to a standard trombone. While the Hagmann valve does not achieve the low 20–25° angle of deflection in axial flow valves, it is still about as free-blowing and, being otherwise substantially similar to a standard rotary valve, is also simpler to lubricate and clean. Unlike early axial valve designs, the Hagmann valve rotor is supported by journal bearings at both ends of the spindle, which allows a tighter clearance with the valve body, reduces wear, and improves rigidity and durability.

The Hagmann valve is similar to several other three-port valve designs. US patents for the Bach balanced or "K" valve (granted 1995) and the Miller valve (granted 1998) show both employing a similar mechanism, but with S-shaped valve ports entirely contained within a rotor cylinder undergoing a 90° turn, and emerging from the sides of the taller valve casing, rather than the top. Very few instruments were built and sold with these valves, and both patents have now expired.

The Shires "Tru-Bore" valve (US patent granted 2006) claims to improve Hagmann's design by mounting the valve on its side to simplify manufacturing. this enables the rotor to be manufactured as single-piece cast solid rotor instead of assembling it from brazed tubes, and eliminating the slight kink in the straight path to improve the air flow.

== Applications ==
Hagmann valves are available on trombones from several manufacturers, especially on their professional ranges, including Bach, Courtois, Haag, Rath, S.E. Shires, Schagerl, and Thein.

Pairs of Hagmann valves on bass trombones can be arranged in dependent or (more commonly) independent arrangement.

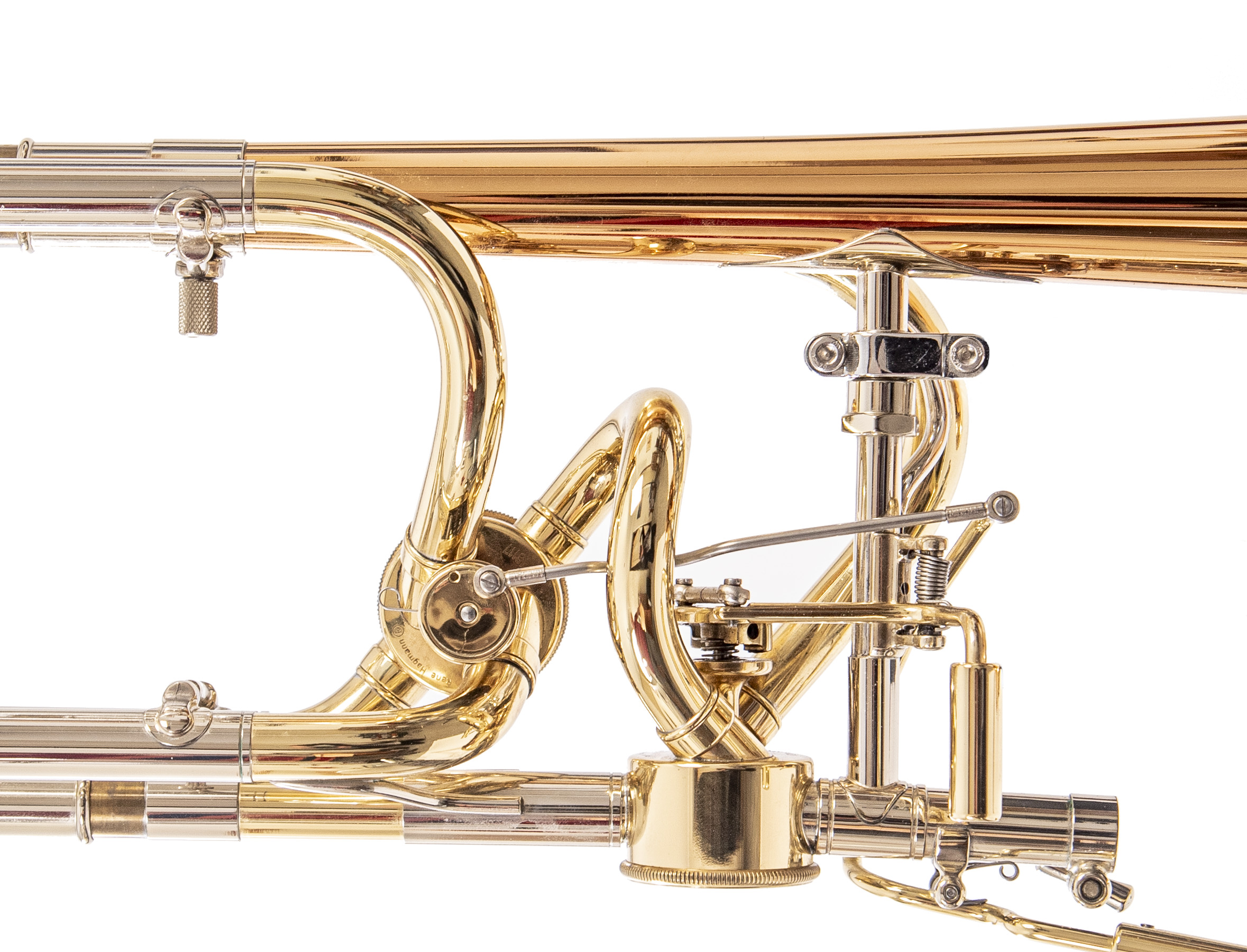
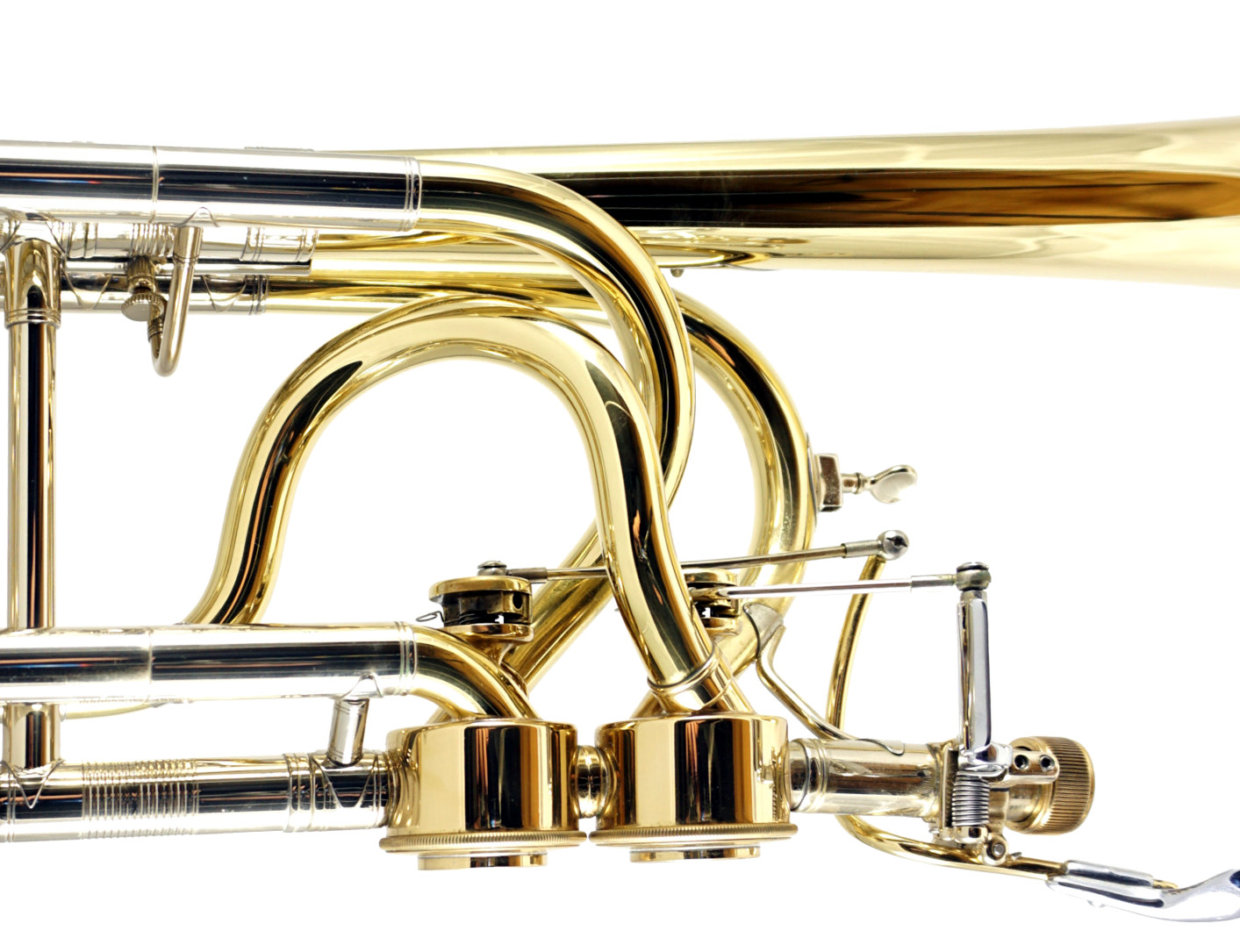
Hagmann valves on bass trombones can be dependent (left) or independent (right).

In 2004 Haag released a cimbasso in F built with five Hagmann valves. Although discontinued, this instrument is still used by several operas and orchestras, including Badische Staatskapelle, Hungarian State Opera, and Sydney Symphony Orchestra, as well as Swedish jazz musician Mattis Cederberg.
