= Brass instrument valve =

Pitch change method in many instruments

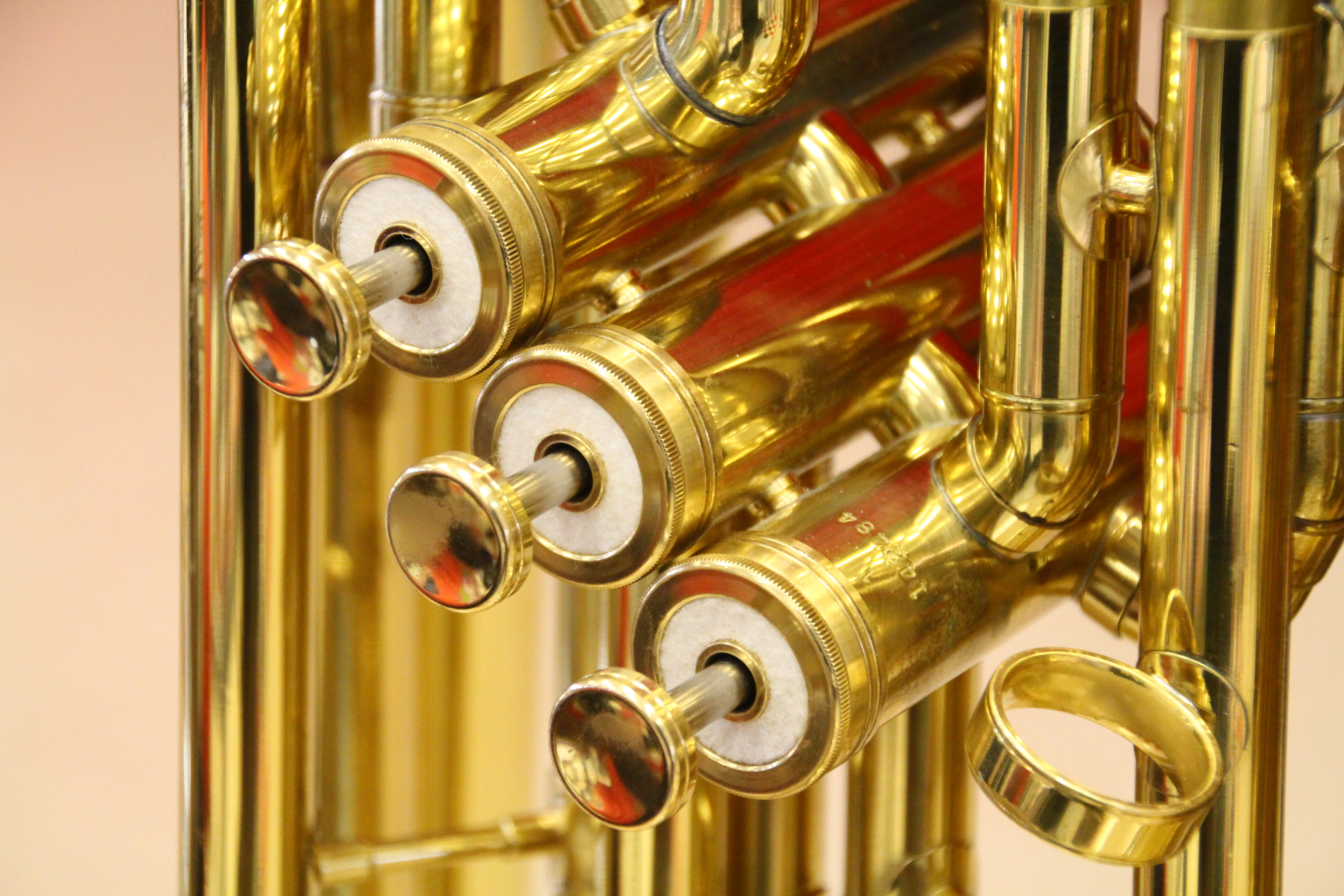
Brass instrument piston valves

Brass instrument valves are valves used to change the length of tubing of a brass instrument allowing the player to reach the notes of various harmonic series. Each valve pressed diverts the air stream through additional tubing, individually or in conjunction with other valves. This lengthens the vibrating air column thus lowering the fundamental tone and associated harmonic series produced by the instrument. Valves in brass instruments require regular maintenance and lubrication to ensure fast and reliable movement.

== Piston valve ==
The first musical instruments with piston valves were developed just after the start of the 19th century.

=== Stölzel valve ===
The first of these types was the Stölzel valve, bearing the name of its inventor Heinrich Stölzel, who first applied these valves to the French horn in 1814. Until that point, there had been no successful valve design, and horn players had to stop off the bell of the instrument, greatly compromising tone quality to achieve a partial chromatic scale.

In a Stölzel valve, the air enters through the bottom of the valve casing, up through the hollow bottom end of the piston, and through a port to the valve loop. The air is then led through an oblique port in the piston to a short tube connecting the valves where it is then directed through the second valve and out the bottom. This type of valve, however, had inherent problems. It forced the air to double back on itself and the 90 degree turns disrupted the bore, causing significant undesired back-pressure. These problems were improved upon later by the double-piston valve.

=== Double-piston valve ===
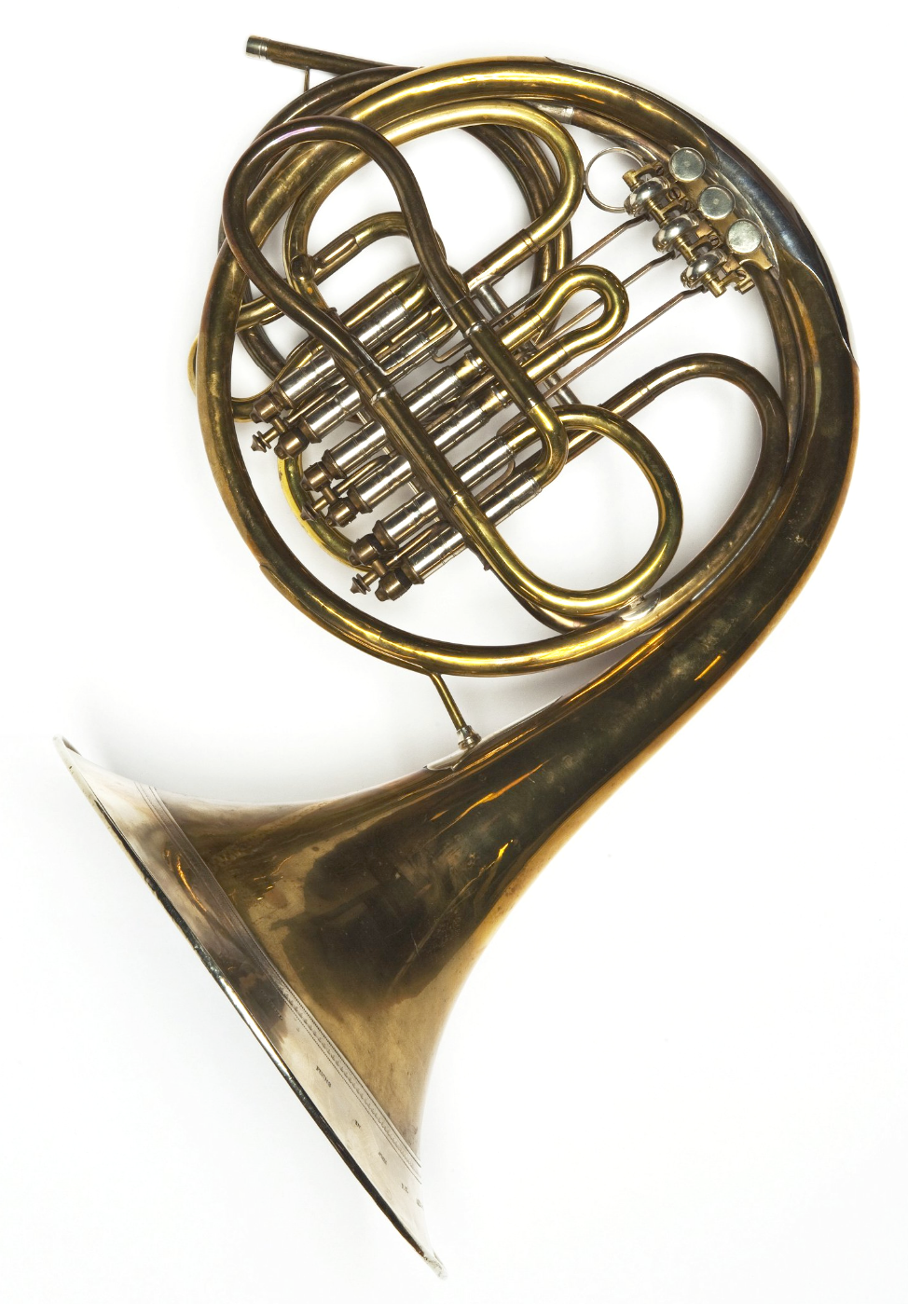
Vienna horn, with three Vienna valves actuated by key rods

The double-piston valve, also called the Vienna valve or pumpenvalve, is a type of valve that preceded the modern piston valve. It was first reported in 1821 on a trumpet built by Christian Friedrich Sattler of Leipzig, and later patented in 1823 by maker Joseph Riedl and horn player Joseph Kail. In this valve type, the simultaneous movement of two pistons bends the air flow in two right angles to introduce an additional valve loop. These turns cause constrictions in the bore, that make the instrument harder to play. At first, the two pistons were operated by a lever connected with braces, but later valves use a mechanism patented by instrument builder Leopold Uhlmann in 1830. These are operated by long rods connecting the pistons to keys on the other side of the instrument and fitted with clocksprings.

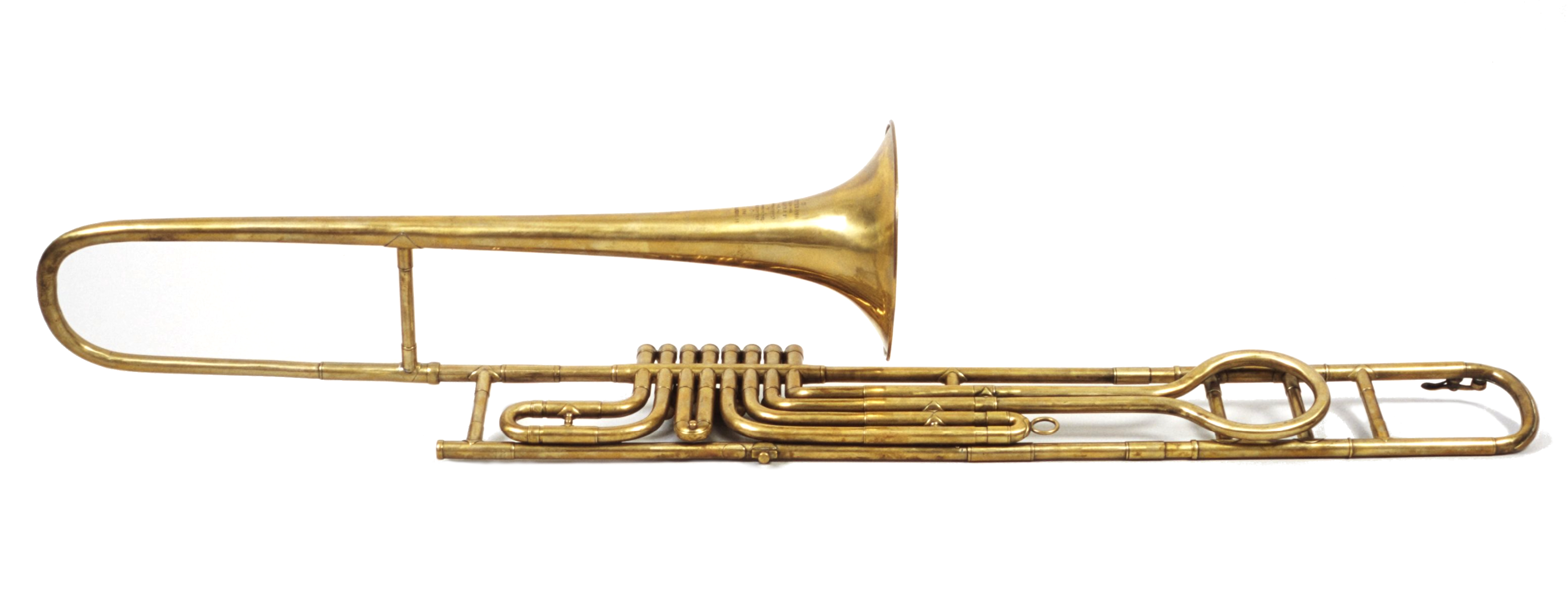
Valve trombone with Système Belge valves, 1910

While they have fallen out of favor compared to modern valves in almost all places, they are often called "Vienna valves" because they are still used almost exclusively in Austria where horn players prefer the smooth legato and natural horn–like timbre of the Vienna horn. The Vienna system was in common use in Germany on many brass instruments including trumpets up to 1850, and as Système Belge on valve trombones in Belgium into the early 20th century.

=== Berlin valve ===
In 1833, Prussian military bandmaster Wilhelm Friedrich Wieprecht applied to patent his Pumpenventil valve design which used a piston to switch paths where the input, output, and valve ports are attached perpendicularly to the outer valve cylinder in the same plane. He patented the first tuba, the Baß-Tuba in F, with Berlin instrument maker Johann Gottfried Moritz in 1835. Later known as Berlinerpumpenventil, Paris instrument maker Adolphe Sax also used Berlin valves for his earliest saxhorns and other brass instruments in the 1840s, before switching to Périnet valves by 1860.

=== Périnet valve ===
Périnet valve; when depressed, the airway is diverted through an extra loop of tubing

The modern piston valve was invented by François Périnet and patented in 1839. They are sometimes called Périnet valves after the inventor. They work by diverting air obliquely through ports in the stock of the valve, so that a loop of tubing is included in the air stream, thus lowering the pitch. The stock of the valve is cylindrical and moves up and down through a larger cylindrical casing.

A small Périnet valve integrated into a trombone mouthpiece, perpendicular to the shank in order to change the throat diameter to facilitate the upper register, was patented by Charles E. Stacy in 1924.

Adolphe Sax invented instruments with six independent piston valves (three for each hand), but only the most dexterous musicians were able to play them. The long lengths of extra tubing used by each of the six valves also made the instruments heavy and cumbersome to play.

Modern valve brass instruments not using either rotary or Vienna valves use this type of valve in a set of three configured to lower the instrument by two, one, and three half-steps respectively, which in combination lower the instrument pitch by up to a tritone. Some instruments (e.g. the tuba and euphonium) add a fourth valve that further lowers the pitch by a perfect fourth.

== Rotary valve ==
Rotary valve in default (A) and engaged (B) positions. 1. airflow, from mouthpiece; 2. airflow, to bell; 3. valve tubing; 4. valve casing; 5. internal rotor, or "plug"; 6. valve ports, or "knuckles"; 7. rotor spindle.

The modern rotary valve uses a short cylindrical rotor, also known as a "stock" or "plug", rotating on a spindle and housed in a valve casing. Two elbow-shaped ports or "knuckles" in the rotor divert the airflow into an extra loop of tubing when rotated 90° and thus lower the pitch.

The first documented examples of a rotating mechanism to select an alternate tubing pathway occurred as early as 1820. A horn in the Kuopio Cultural History Museum in Finland built c. 1820 by Johann Friedrich Anderst, a German-born St. Petersburg instrument maker, has a "butterfly" mechanism, consisting of a rotating pin with two wings attached, rotating 90° inside a chamber to switch pathways. Independently in 1821 Luigi Pini, a horn player from Parma in Italy, invented a valve using a toothed rod which when pushed turns two cogs either side, each turning an attached single-port rotor 90° to divert the airway. An instrument with these valves built in 1822 by Italian maker Lorenzo Dall'Asta survives in the Museo della Musica in Bologna. In the United States, Nathan Adams (1783-1864), an instrument maker and navy bandmaster, built a trumpet c. 1824–25 with valves very similar to the modern rotary valve, but smaller and with flattened tubing in the port exits.

Despite these predecessors, the invention of the rotary valve as used on modern brass instruments is often credited to Joseph Riedl, a German musician and inventor, who patented his design in 1832.

In variations on Riedl's design into the 20th century, the rotor ports were cut or drilled from a rotor made from a slice of solid brass rod, or sometimes used short pieces of tubing, brazed into an assembled or cast rotor. Many other innovations in traditional rotary valve design and manufacture have taken place since the late 20th century to improve their resistance and other playing characteristics. Willson Rotax and CAIDEX valves and Greenhoe valves use vents between the ports to allow air to escape through the rotor as the rotor switches positions. This eliminates the "pop" heard or felt with a traditional rotary valve. Other designs use a larger diameter rotor to accommodate port tubing with a circular or constant-area cross-section, which helps with perceived "stuffiness" of valves; earlier designs used narrow elliptical tubes to fit into a smaller diameter rotor. German maker Meinlschmidt have patented an "Open Flow" rotor with self-lubricating spiral channels in the rotor spindle and open, circular ports.

Horns almost always have rotary valves, and they are found on many orchestral F and CC tubas and most cimbassos. In European orchestras, particularly in Germany, they are also used for trumpets, bass trumpets, and Wagner tubas.

Trombone F attachment valves are usually rotary, although the desire to maintain "openness" through the valve section by eliminating 90° bends in the valve and tubing has led to many radical valve designs since the 1970s, such as the Thayer axial flow valve and Hagmann valve.

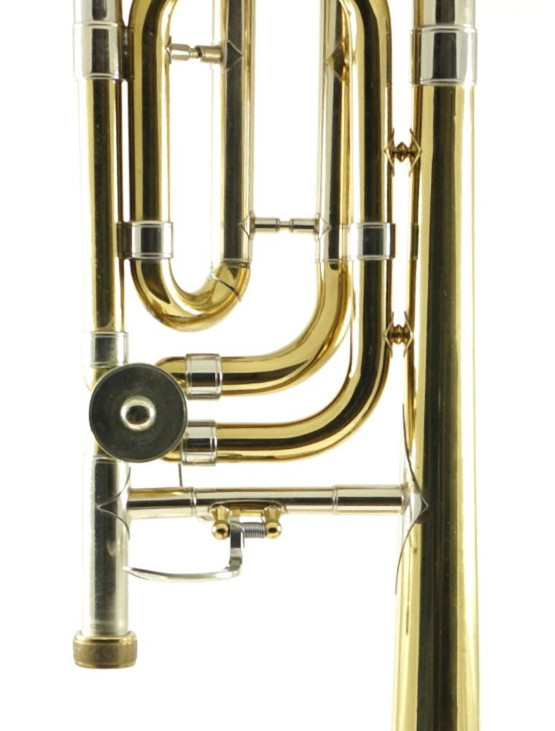
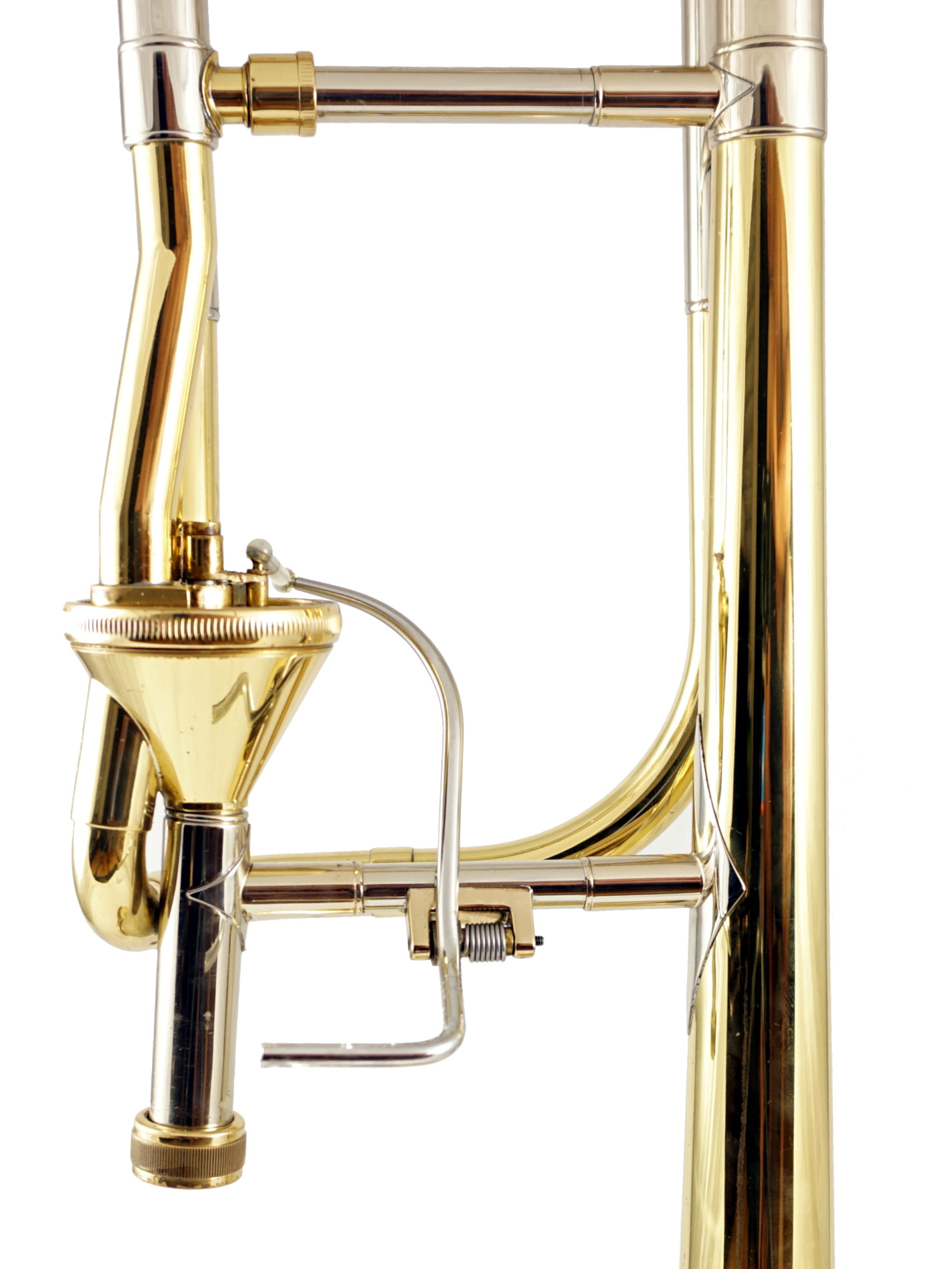
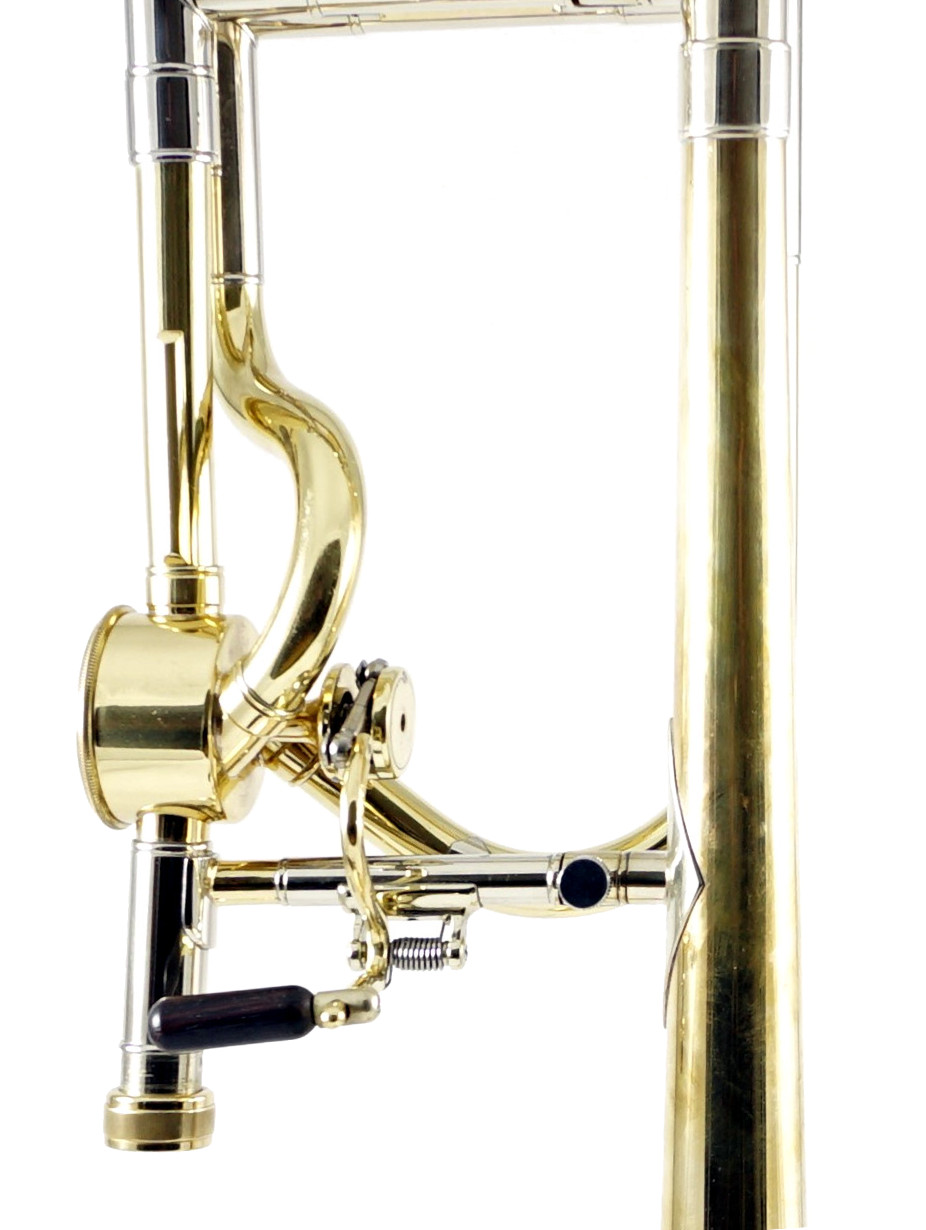
Trombone valve attachments. Standard rotary valve, left; Thayer axial flow valve, center; Hagmann valve, right.

=== Thayer/Axial Flow valve ===
Axial flow valve in default (A) and engaged (B) positions. 1. airflow, from mouthpiece; 2. airflow, to bell; 3. valve tubing; 4. valve casing; 5. conical rotor; 6. input (a) and return (b) valve ports; 7. spindle axis of rotation.

Axial flow valves are an alternative for the traditional rotary valve found on trombones with valve attachments. Patented by Orla Ed Thayer in 1978, it uses a conical rotor with the spindle axis parallel to the tubing, and deflecting the direction of the airflow by only 28° or less. Several subsequent patents attempted to address its reliability and leakage problems using spring tensioners and lighter rotor materials, and a 2011 patent greatly improved the action, stability and reliability of the valve by mounting bearings at both ends of the rotor spindle. Vincent Bach use this design for their "Infinity Valve" on their "AF" trombones, replacing the older Thayer design on their now discontinued "T" designation trombones.

=== Hagmann valve ===
Hagmann valve, in default (A) and engaged (B) positions, top (above) and side view (below). 1. air flow, from mouthpiece; 2. air flow, to bell; 3. air flow to and from valve tubing; 4. valve casing; 5. valve cap; 6. straight-path valve port; 7. valve ports, to tubing emerging at the top of the valve casing; 8. spindle axis of rotation. Source: Figs. 1A–1E (prior art), Shires Tru-Bore patent.

Several other designs of rotary valve have arisen from attempts to create air paths through the valve that avoid the tight kinks in the tubing caused by the traditional rotor ports. In the most widely adopted of these, the Hagmann valve, the rotor has three ports: one straight through, and two when the valve is engaged, which bend only 45° and arise through the top of the valve casing, instead of through the rotor plane. The S.E. Shires "Tru-Bore" valve is similar but uses a completely straight path in the default position, as well as simpler manufacturing and improved reliability. Earlier three-port valve designs, such as the Miller valve and the Selmer "K" valve, use a taller cylinder to deflect the air though two S-shaped knuckles, rather than emerging through the top of the valve casing.

== Bibliography ==
- Eliason, RE (1970). "Early American Valves for Brass Instruments". The Galpin Society Journal. 23 (August 1970): 86–96. doi:10.2307/842067.
- Meucci, Renato; Rocchetti, Gabriele (2023). The Horn. Yale Musical Instrument Series. New Haven: Yale University Press. ISBN 978-0-300-11893-3. JSTOR 10.2307/jj.9421074. OCLC 1412751193. Wikidata Q134955624.
