= Framus =

German string instrument manufacturer

- Type: Private
- Industry: String instruments
- Founded: Luby, Czechoslovakia (1946; 80 years ago)
- Founder: Fred Wilfer
- Defunct: 1975–1995
- Headquarters: Markneukirchen, Germany
- Area served: Global
- Products: Violins; Violas; Cellos; Double basses Dulcimers; Zithers; Lutes; Classical, archtop, acoustic and electric guitars Lap & pedal steel guitars Acoustic & electric basses Electric upright basses Ukuleles; Banjos; Mandolins; Amplifiers
- Owner: Hans-Peter Wilfer
- Divisions: Warwick GmbH & Co Music Equipment KG
- Subsidiaries: Giannini Drums
- Website: Framus Vintage website Framus International website

Framus is a German string instrument manufacturing company, that existed from 1946 until 1975. The Framus brand was revived in 1995 as part of Warwick GmbH & Co Music Equipment KG, in Markneukirchen, Germany. The company has offices located in Markneukirchen, Shanghai and Nashville.

== Timeline ==
- 1946: The foundation of Fränkische Musikinstrumentenerzeugung ("Franconian Musical Instruments Fabrication") by Fred A. Wilfer KG in Erlangen, Germany, to help resettle luthiers displaced from Luby in the Sudetenland).
- 1954: A larger factory was built in Bubenreuth, Germany, to house the 300-strong workforce.
- 1967: Further expansion saw the building of a second facility in Pretzfeld, Germany.
- 1975: The rapidly changing market forced the company to close.
- 1995: Framus musical instruments resumed production under Warwick GmbH & Co Music Equipment KG.

== History ==
=== Early years ===
Framus originated in the town of Luby (now in the Czech Republic), until 1946 known as Schönbach, which was the world centre of making of violins and other string instruments. The founder of Framus, Fred Wilfer, was born in the Bohemian area in 1917. After World War II, when he heard about plans to expel Sudeten Germans from post-War II Czechoslovakia, he decided to build up a new basis for his countryman and the music industry in the west.

Even before the first train transported violin makers from Schönbach to other areas, Wilfer contacted different government authorities in Bavaria and told them about his plans. The Bavarian government welcomed his approach and asked him to create all the conditions needed for the industry in Bavaria. In 1946, he founded the FRAMUS works, the name being a portmanteau of FRAnconian MUSical instruments, and designed to draw attention to the fact that the celebrated violin makers of Schönbach had made Franconia their new home.

When the first train transporting violin makers from Schönbach arrived in Erlangen, Wilfer was the man in charge of finding housing for them. He also made arrangements for the establishment of the first workshops.

=== Progress ===
In March 1946, the first group of Schönbach violin makers arrived in Erlangen, with Fred Wilfer and the refugee commission arranging accommodation. A factory was set up in autumn 1946, in a former wheel warehouse in Möhrendorf. At the end of 1948, the factory was moved to a former brewery in the nearby town of Baiersdorf. Soon, even that large space proved inadequate.

In late 1949, Bubenreuth became the centre of settlement for the Schönbach violin makers. There, Wilfer began building one of the most modern factories of the time and, in the summer of 1954, about 170 employees went to work at the new facility. With 2200 square metres of space at their disposal, they were soon producing more than 2000 instruments in a month.

Vintage Framus guitars

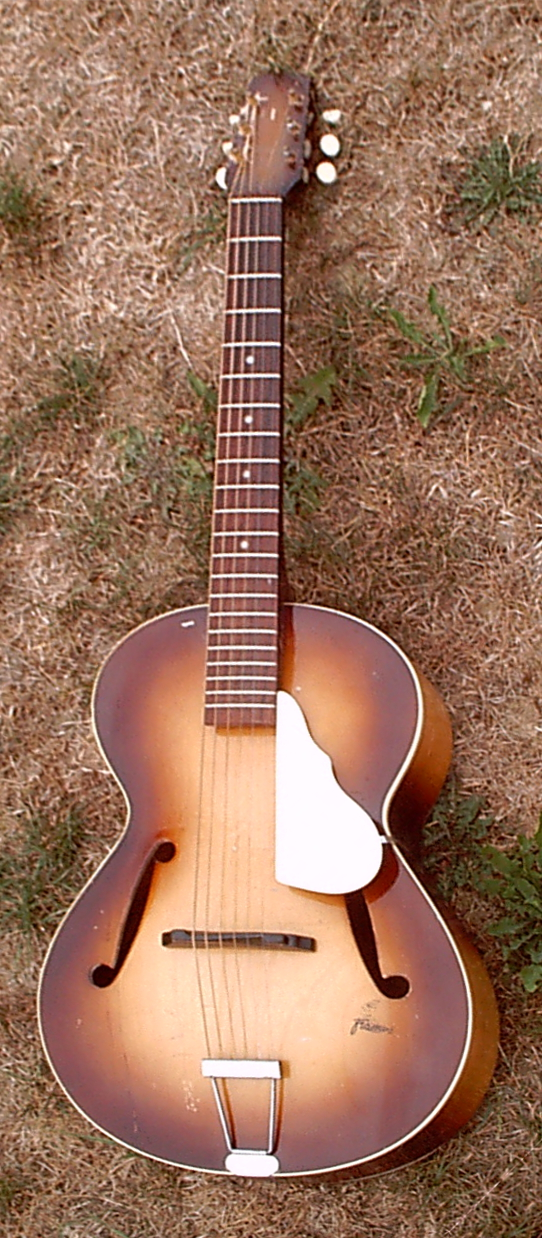
Framus archtop (1959)

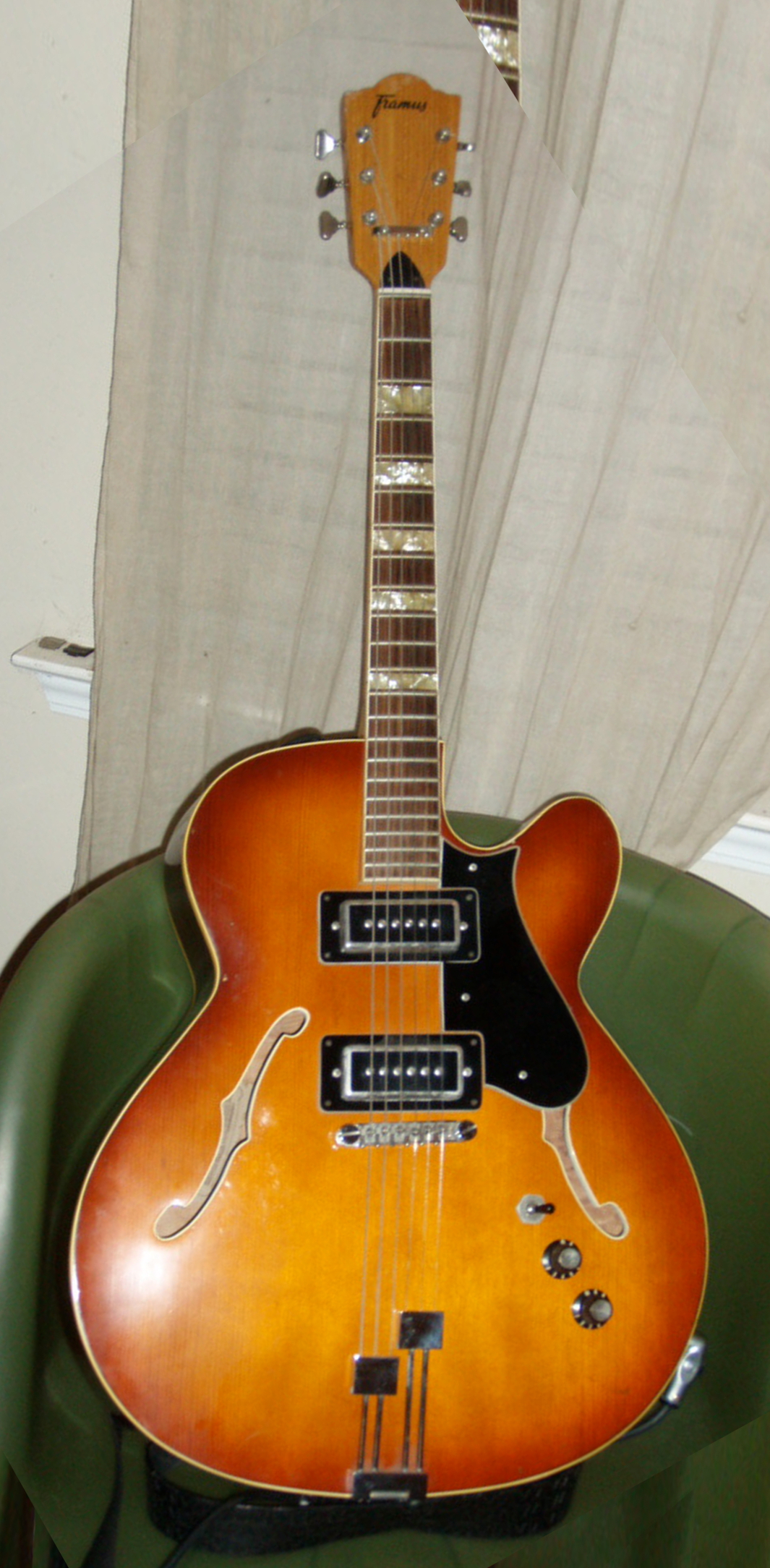
Framus archtop

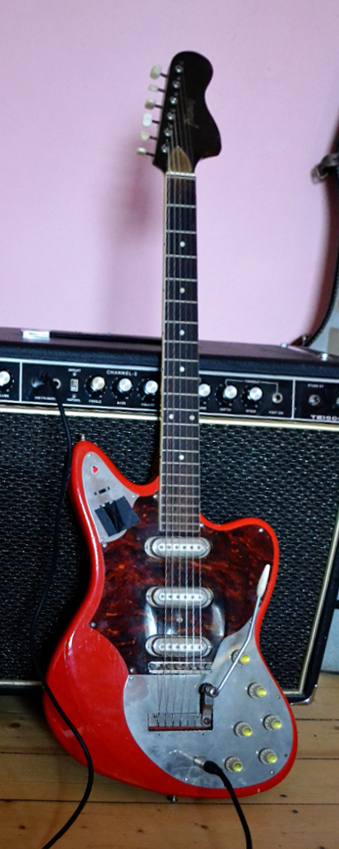
5/168-54 Strato de Luxe (1960s)

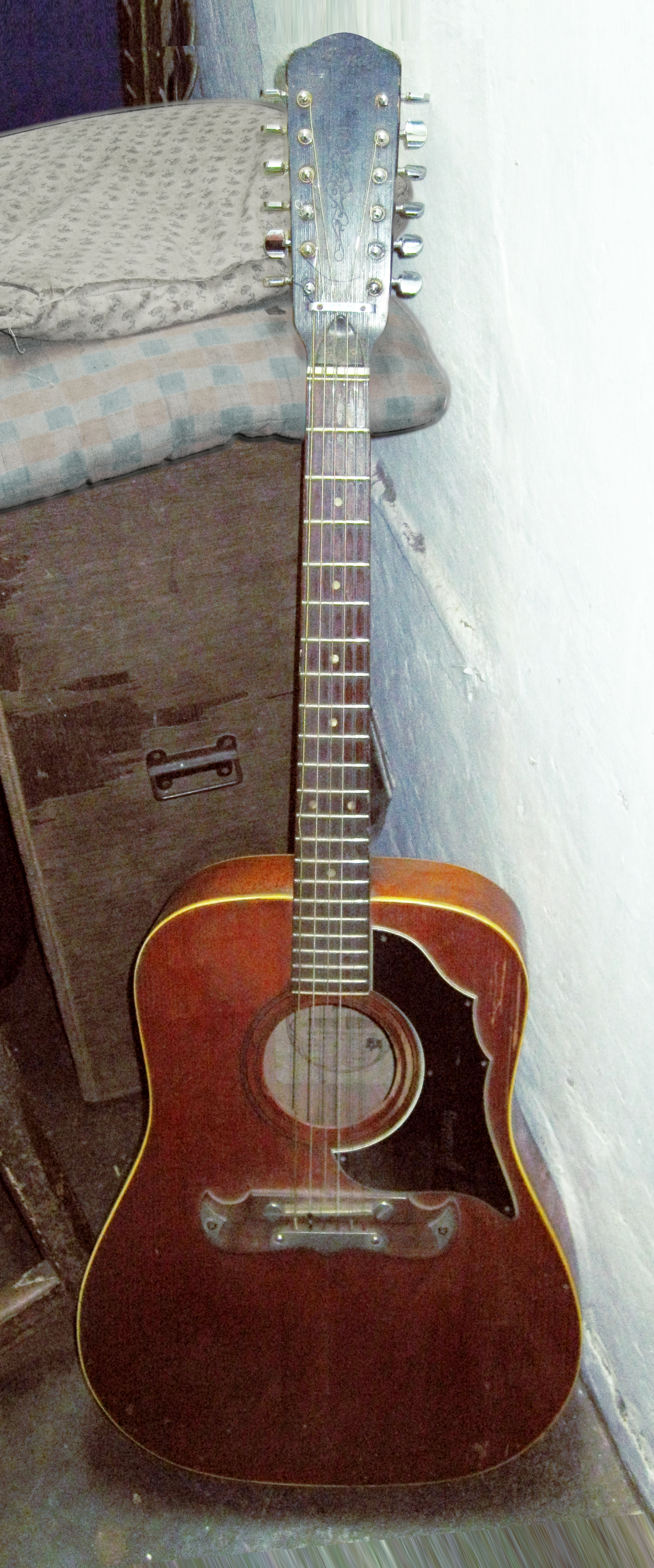
5/296 Texan 12string (mid 1960s–1970s)

The guitar—particularly the electric guitar—became the new best seller. Sales increased enormously due to the popularity of rock and roll music at the end of the 1950s. Because of that development, several technologic advances were introduced, such as putting truss rods in guitar necks. In 1966, a second factory was built in Pretzfeld, 25 km north of Bubenreuth, in Franconian Switzerland. Framus became the largest guitar producer in Europe, employing around 300 workers by that time.

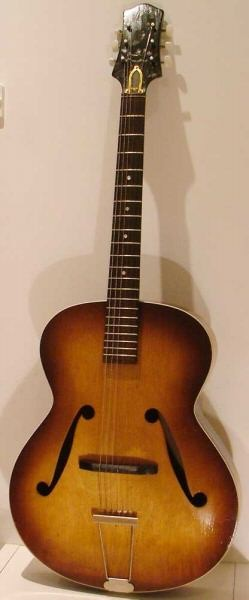
Zenith model 17 (played by Paul McCartney)

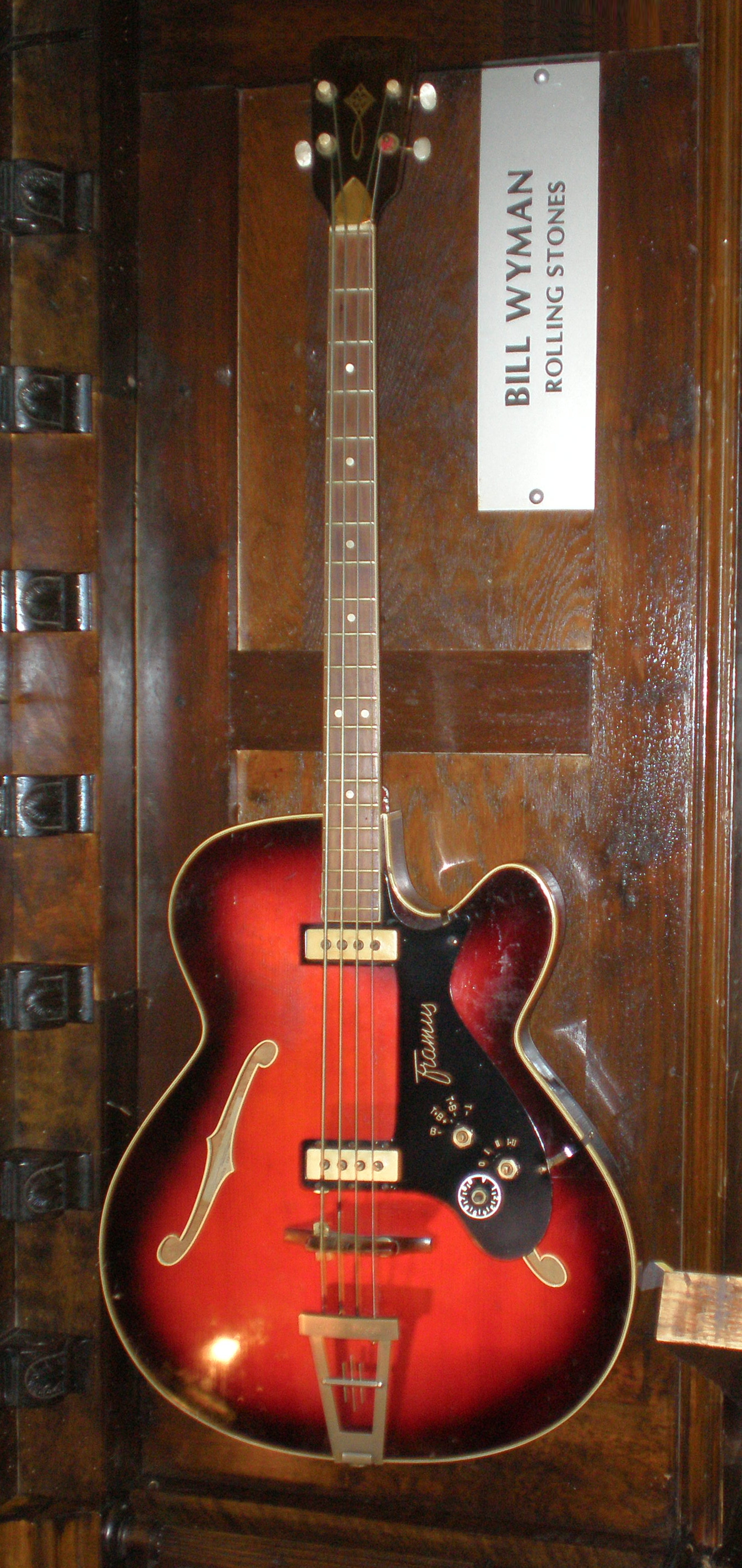
5/150 Star Bass (played by Bill Wyman)

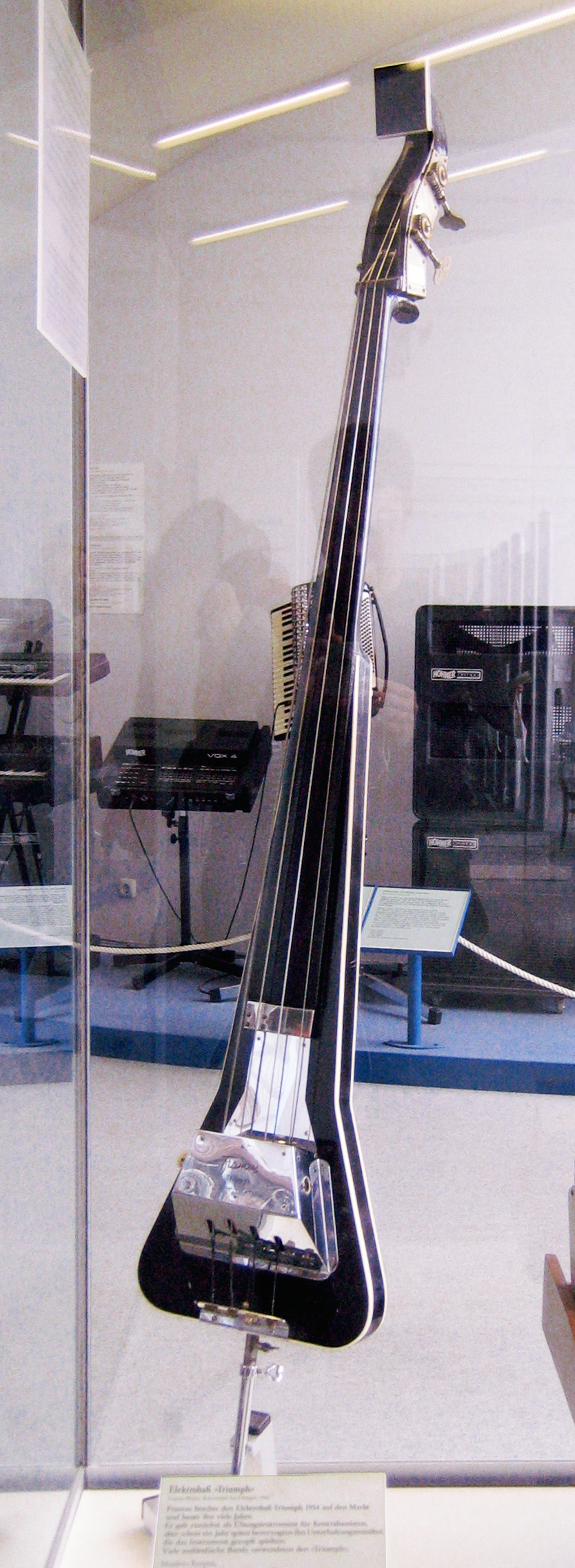
4/60 Triumph Bass

In the 1950s, Paul McCartney owned a model of a Framus Ivor Mairants "Zenith" guitar. He had originally been given a trumpet for his 14th birthday in 1956 but realised he could not sing and play a trumpet, so he swapped it for a Framus "Zenith" model 17. He used the guitar to compose some of his first songs, including "When I'm Sixty-Four". It still hangs in his studio.

Although their guitars were more popular by far, Framus made other stringed instruments. In particular, their four-string tenor banjos were very popular among Irish traditional musicians.

The company included a musical kindergarten in the Bubenreuth factory. It employed a young teacher, Gertrud Fischer, who used with small, colored "note men" that helped children start learning musical notation at the age of three.

Visitors to the factory in Bubenreuth included the Vienna Saengerknaben (Boys Choir), who performed a special concert in the workshop, and German Chancellor Konrad Adenauer, who toured the factory and its musical kindergarten during a visit to the violin-making village.

=== Bankruptcy ===
In an interview, Wilfer summarized his all-embracing concept: "It's not only important to produce instruments, over a long period it is important to 'produce customers' ". That motto also related to other Framus projects. Eventually, dumping by companies from Japan, along with other factors, both external and internal, forced Framus into bankruptcy in the mid-1970s.

Many aspects of the history of Framus are still unclear, due to the company archives being lost as a result of the bankruptcy.

=== Framus today ===
In 1995, Hans-Peter Wilfer (son of founder Fred Wilfer) revived the Framus name to produce musical instruments as part of Warwick GmbH & Co Music Equipment KG in Markneukirchen, Germany. Along with a range of electric guitars, the company produces replacement parts, such as knobs, tuners, bridges, and tailpieces, for their vintage models, as well as a small range of high-end tube amplifiers.

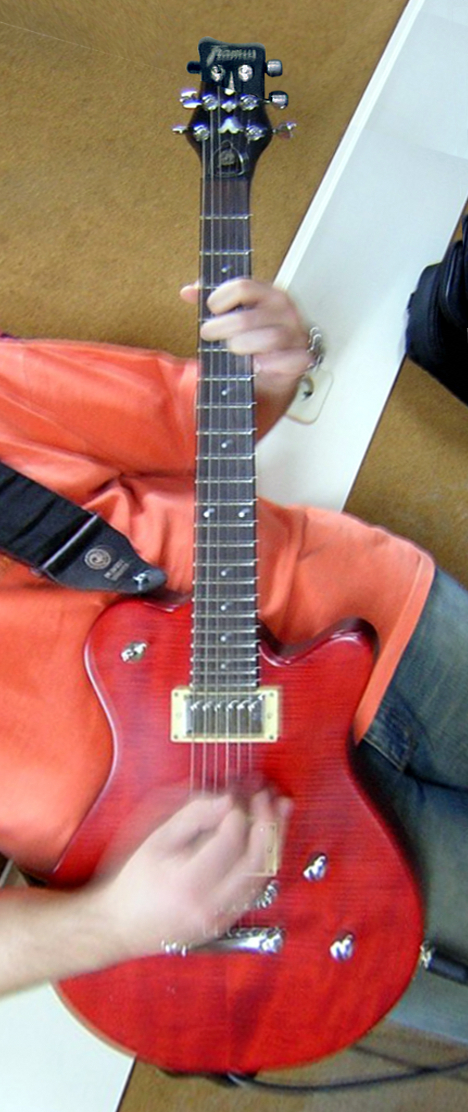
Panthera Pro

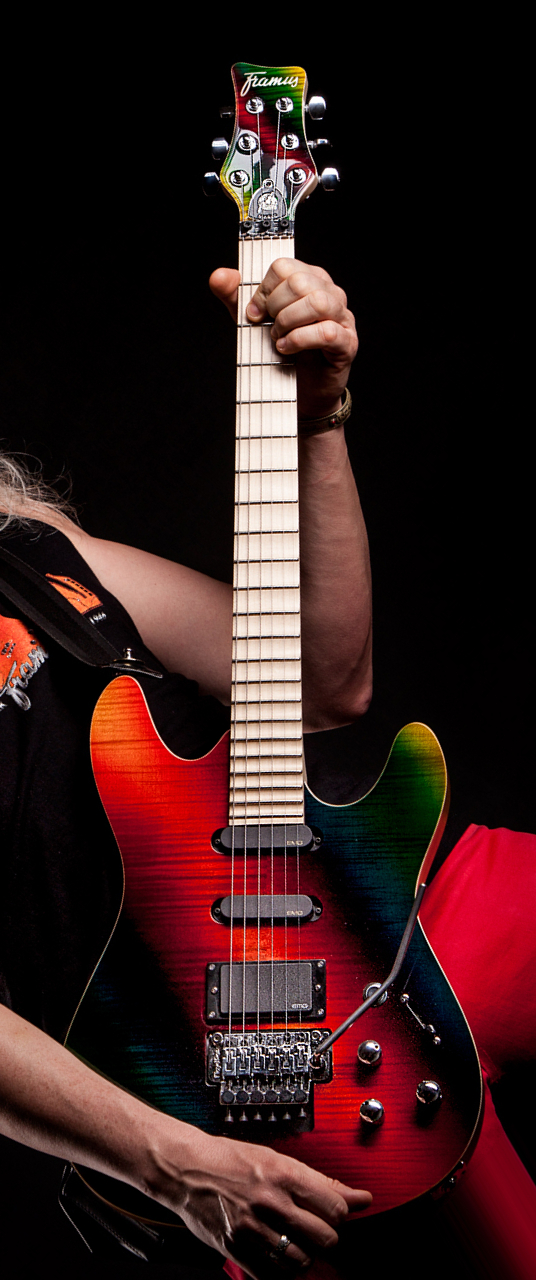
Diablo Custom

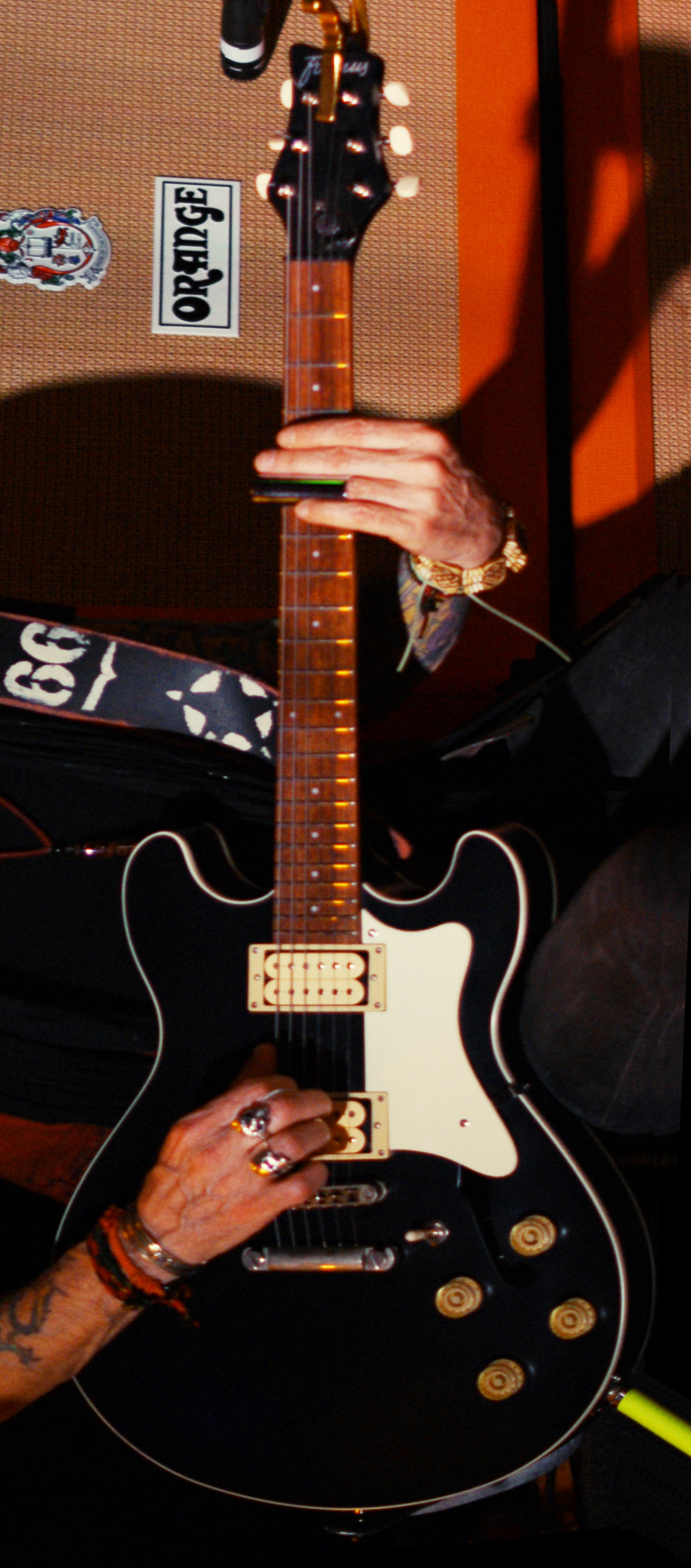
Mayfield
(played by Earl Slick)

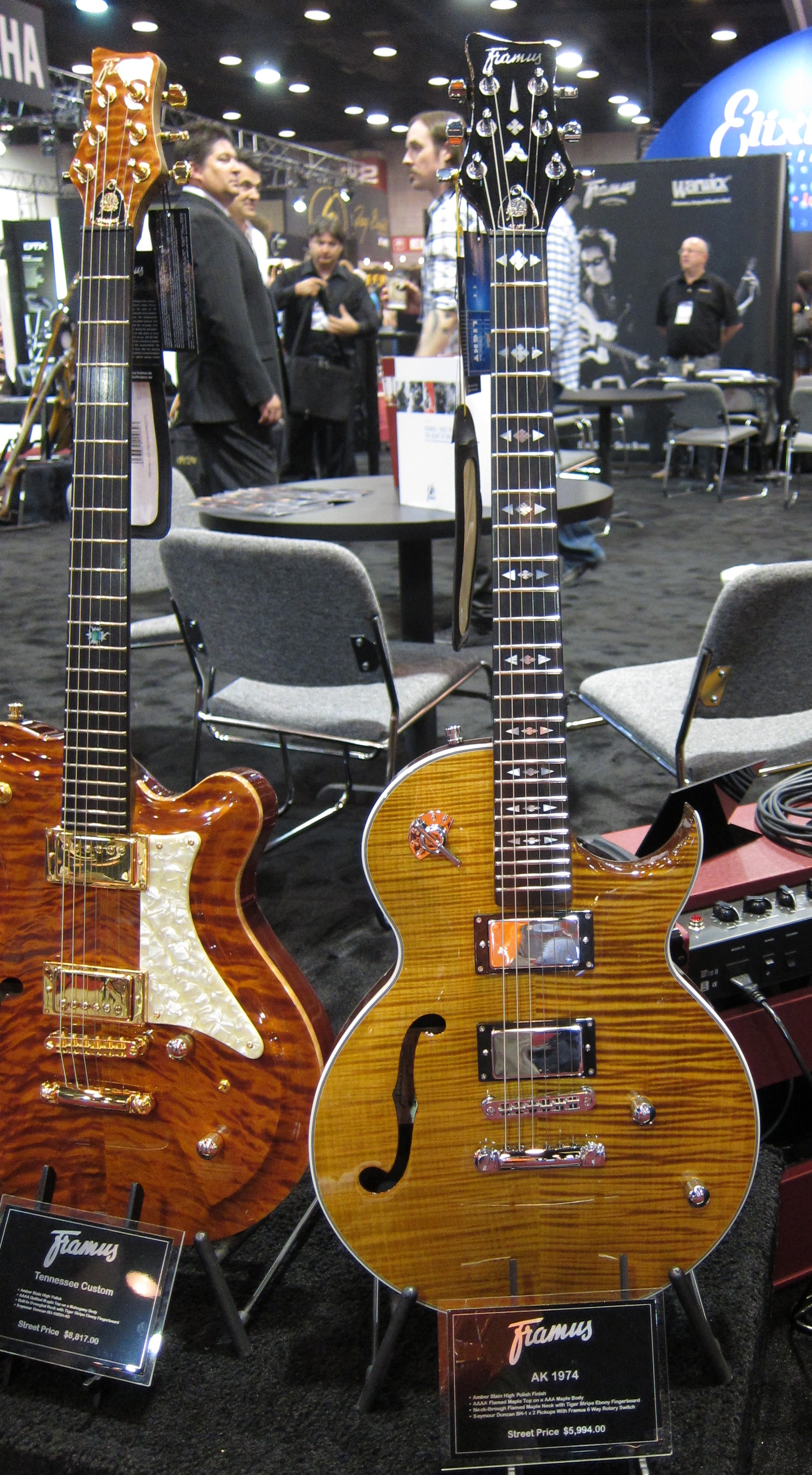
Tennessee Custom and AK-1974

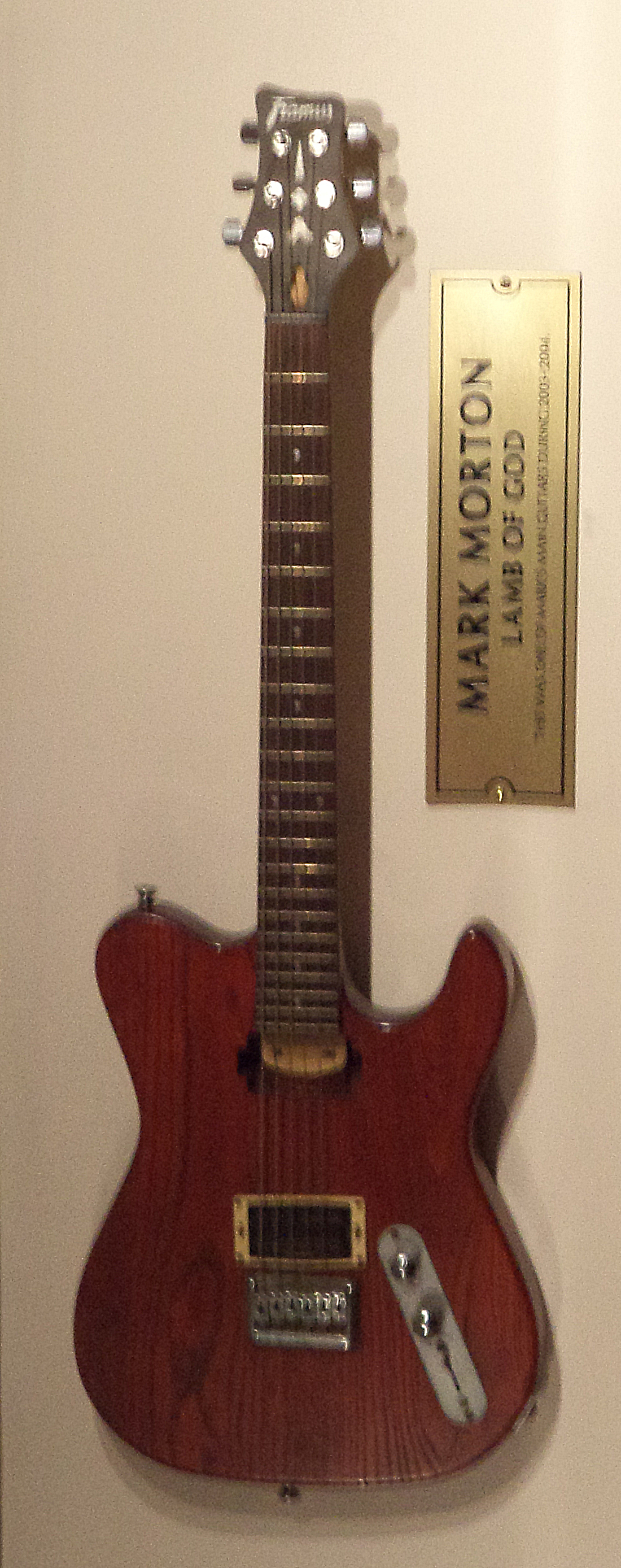
Renegade Pro

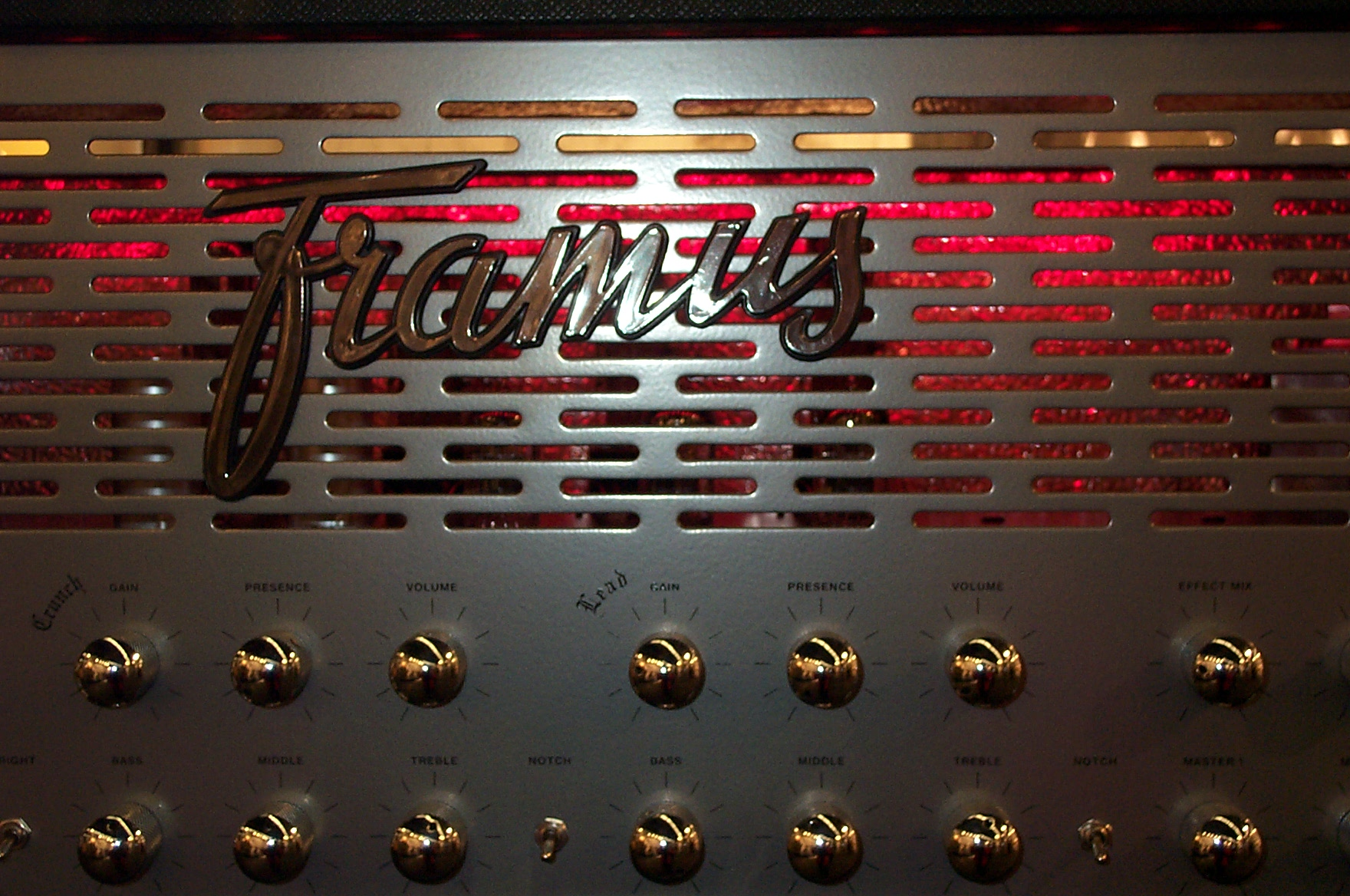
Framus Cobra Top
(100W 3-input tube amp head with MIDI control)

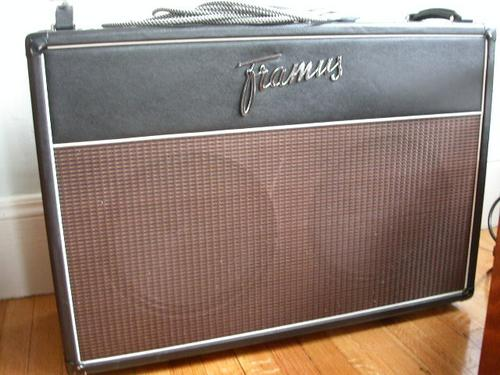
Framus Ruby Riot
(2011. 2×12" 30W all tube amp, with reverb & searing drive)

== Notable users ==
In the early 1960s, Framus Star Bass guitars were among the first bass guitars imported into Britain. Many of the early British rock and roll bass guitarists—including Jet Harris, Brian Locking, Brian Gregg, Heinz Burt, and Bill Wyman—played Framus basses. In 1964, Wyman signed a three-year sponsorship deal endorsing the Star bass. Guitarists in the United States who endorsed Framus guitars at that time included Charlie Mingus and Jim Hall.

- Billy Lorento (later known as pickup designer Bill Lawrence) played his signature 5/120. He was also the Framus tech for Dan Armstrong.
- (Sandy) Alex G plays a Framus Panthera.
- Peter Kraus played various signature models of tenor guitar, including a small-bodied flat-top acoustic and the two-pickup 5/141 semihollow electric.
- Jan Akkerman plays his signature model.
- Lamb of God guitarist Willie Adler uses Framus speaker cabinets with four 12 inch speakers. In their DVD entitled Killadelphia, Adler praises Framus for giving him "A backdrop to fuckin' die for."
- John Lennon bought a Framus Hootenanny in 1965, which George Harrison occasionally also played. It was used by Lennon to perform the song You've Got To Hide Your Love Away in the 1965 film Help! (He also used it on It's Only Love, as well as on title-track for the 1965 Parlophone record). George used the instrument during the recording of I've Just Seen a Face. In 2024, the guitar was sold for $2.9 million by Julien's Auctions of Gardena, California.
- Paul McCartney's first guitar was a Zenith (built by Framus on commission from Boosey & Hawkes), which he still owns.
- Phil Campbell of Motörhead uses several Framus guitars.
- Earl Slick, guitarist for David Bowie and New York Dolls, uses a Framus signature guitar.
- Rik Emmett (Triumph) played a Framus Akkerman (AK74 or AK1974) early in his career
- Phil X (Triumph, Bon Jovi) plays a Framus signature model as well.
- Arcade Fire guitarist Richard Reed Parry uses a vintage Framus Billy Lorento model.
- Devin Townsend, uses a number of Framus guitars including several custom made guitars of the model AK-1974, Mayfield and a signature model. He also collaborated with the company to develop The Blank model.
- Stevie Salas, uses the Framus Idolmaker model, which was developed in a collaboration with him.
- Wolf Hoffmann, of the German heavy metal band Accept. He made a signature model based on the Gibson Flying V.
- Simple Plan guitarist Sébastien Lefebvre's electric guitars include the Framus Mayfield and Tennessee models. He used to play Framus Panthera and Renegade models. He currently uses a Framus Dragon head and cabinet amplifier with his Framus custom model.
- Guy Pratt, who plays with Pink Floyd and David Gilmour, plays a Framus Triumph.
- Clemens Rehbein, who plays with Milky Chance, from Kassel, DE uses a Framus Mayfield.
- William DuVall, of the American grunge band Alice in Chains
- Kristof Hahn of American experimental rock band Swans plays a Framus 8 string Lap Steel Guitar.
