= Cheb Violin Making School =

School in the Czech Republic

Houslařská škola Cheb Cheb Violin Making School
- Established: 1 August 1873; 151 years ago
- Mission: Training of violin-makers
- Owner: Public institution
- Location: Cheb, Czech Republic
- Website: www.violinschool.eu

The Cheb Violin Making School is a public school in Cheb in the Czech Republic. It is the outgrowth of the Imperial-Royal Music School, a one hundred and fifty-one-year-old institution, located — from inception on 1 August 1873 until 2005 — in Luby. In 2005, the school moved to Cheb. It is the only surviving violin-making school in the country, and one of five in all of Europe. Luby had been, and still is a town rich in tradition of generations of violin-making dating back to the sixteenth century.

== History ==
1873–1918, Schönbach, Austria-Hungary

At the initiative of Richard Dotzauer (1816–1887), the K.K. Music School in Schönbach launched on 1 August 1873. Initially, students received instruction in homes, and beginning 1882, at the Schönbach Town Hall. The school was founded exclusively to train musicians. But in October 1903, under professor Josef Anton Pfluger (1874–1914), the school launched a curriculum in string instrument making: violins, guitars, and sheet music publishing. By 1908, the school was predominately filled with students learning the art of violin and guitar making. On 24 June 1911 the foundation stone was laid for the school's first building on Bahnhofstrasse and teaching in that building commenced at the start of 1912.

1918–1938, Schönbach, Czechoslovakia

The musical instrument region, which included Schönbach, had been part of the Austro-Hungarian Empire, which collapsed after the end of World War I in 1918.

1938–1945, Schönbach, Nazi Germany

In 1938, following the Great Depression, Germany took possession of the western region of Czechoslovakia known as the Sudetenland, and occupied it until the end of World War II. During this period, there was a sharp decline in the production of musical instruments from the region.

1946–1992, Luby, Czechoslovakia

In 1946, right after World War II, Czechoslovakia restored the pre-1938 border and, among other things, changed the German town name of Schönbach to "Luby". In 1949, residents with German ethnicity, which included many violin-makers, were expelled from Czechoslovakia. About 1,600 Schönbach instrument makers settled in Bubenreuth of Erlangen, which before then had only about 500 residents. Bubenreuth was, at that time, in the American zone of what became West Germany. Bubenreuth eventually became known as the second Schönbach and even erected a replica of the Luthier statue of Schönbach. Since 1946, Bubenreuth became the third largest center in Germany (behind Mittenwald in Bavaria and Markneukirchen in Vogtland) for the construction of stringed and plucked instruments and accessories.

Following the 1948 Czechoslovak coup d'état, Czechoslovakia fell under communist rule and the remaining violin making industry in Luby, supported by the Violin Making School, was nationalized under the name Cremona.

1993–2005 Luby, Czech Republic

The Violin Making School continued to train luthiers from around the globe.

2005–present, Cheb, Czech Republic

In 2005, the Violin Making School moved to Cheb.

== The Schönbach School ==
The phrase, Schönbach School, when used in the context of pioneer luthiers from Schönbach, not the formal school, generally refers to three eras of influential luthiers:

- Violin-maker, Elias Placht (born 1690), from 1721 is considered the founder of the violin-making school of Schönbach. The era of this school extended throughout the 18th century, when more than 40 violin makers resided in Schönbach. Master quality master instruments in Schönbach were built mainly by the Plachta family, but also by Sander, Hoyer, and Schuster families.
- Beginning in the 1900, when electricity and a railway was introduced to Schönbach, combined with a sharp rise in demand for student instruments (particularly in North American), mass production of orchestral string instruments ensued. In the following years, more than 3000 people are employed in this field. Annual production in Schönbach was around 150,000 instruments. In 1927, a statue of a luthier was erected in Schönbach to memorialize all the unknown luthiers and music instrument masters who contributed to the development of this field in Schönbach region. This era of the Schönbach School was led by Karel Müller, Wilibald Wilfer, Alfred Neudörfer, and later, Josef Pötzl.
- In the 1970s and 1980s, the Luby School was well-represented by master luthiers Emil Lupač, Karel Zadražil, Josef Budil, Miroslav Pikart, Libor Šefl, and Jan Pötzl, all of whom had worked for the Cremona factory in Luby.

== Notable alumni ==
- Rudolf Riedl (born 1920), attended from 1935 to 1937
- Otto Mettal (born 1910)

== Videos ==
- TV News Story about the Violin Making School Cheb, 11 July 2012
- The violin makers of Bubenreuth (reflecting on Schönbach), produced by Jochen Reim, de:Medienwerkstatt Franken (2001)

== Other violin-making schools ==
- State School for Violin Making and Plucked Instruments in Mittenwald, Germany
- Ecole Internationale de Lutherie, Marche-en-Famenne, Belgium
- ILSA, International Lutherie School Antwerpen, Belgium
- Ecole Nationale de Lutherie, Mirecourt, France
- The Swiss School of Violin Making, Brienz
- Ikaalinen Handicraft and Industrial Arts Institute, Ikaalinen, Finland
