= Höfner =

German manufacturer of musical instruments

Karl Höfner GmbH & Co. KG
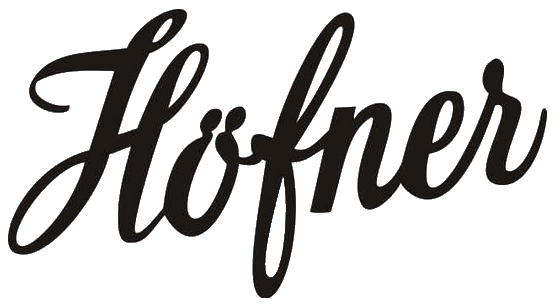
- Type: Private
- Industry: Musical instruments
- Founded: Schönbach, Austria-Hungary 1887; 139 years ago
- Founder: Karl Höfner
- Headquarters: Hagenau, Germany
- Area served: Worldwide
- Products: Electric, acoustic, resonator and classical guitars Electric basses Ukuleles; Violins; Violas; Cellos; Double basses Bows
- Website: hofner.com

Karl Höfner GmbH & Co. KG is a German (originally Austro-Bohemian) manufacturer of musical instruments, with one division that manufactures guitars and basses, and another that manufactures other string instruments, such as violins, violas, cellos, double basses and bows for stringed instruments.

Much of Höfner's popularity is attributed to Paul McCartney's use of the Höfner 500/1 electric bass guitar throughout his career. This violin-shaped model is commonly referred to as the "Beatle bass".

== Company history ==
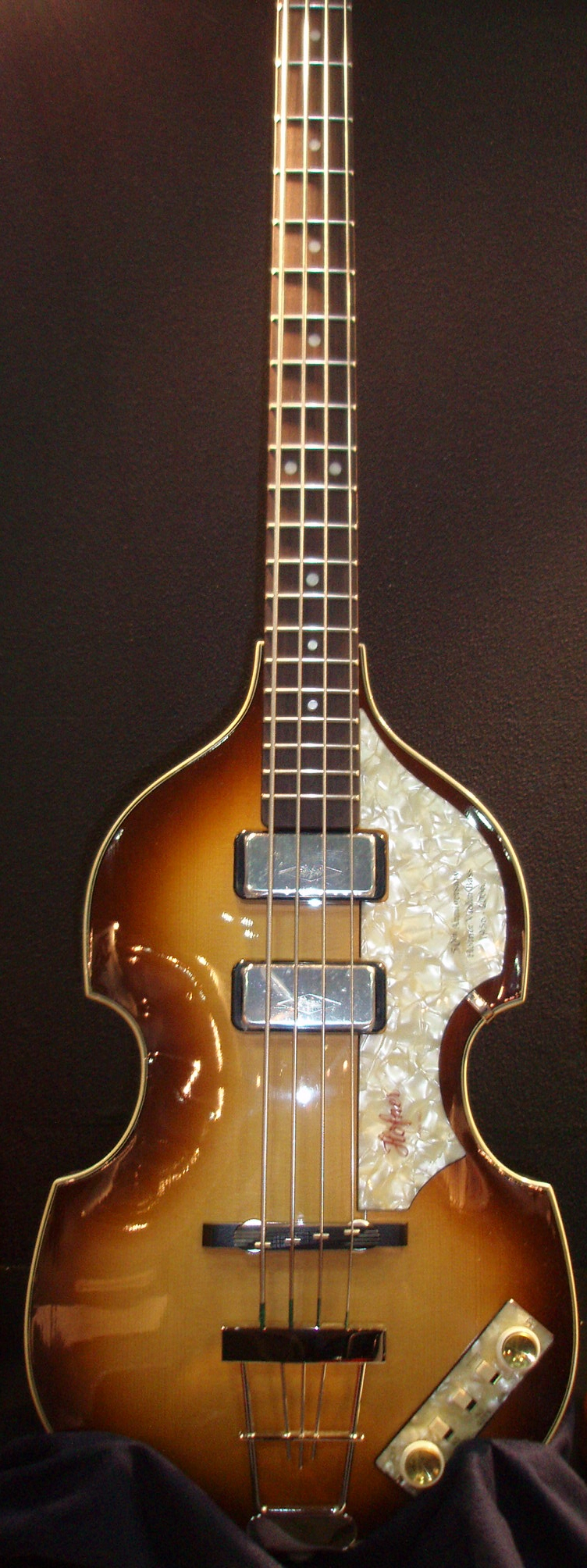
A Höfner 500/1 "violin bass" similar to the one used by Paul McCartney

A German luthier, Karl Höfner (1864–1955), founded the Höfner company in the "music corner" region of German-Bohemian Vogtland, in the town of Schönbach in Austria-Hungary (now Luby in the Czech Republic) in 1887. He soon became the largest string instrument manufacturer in the country. His sons, Josef and Walter, joined the company around 1920, and began spreading the brand's reputation worldwide. The company became involved in production for the German army in World War II producing wooden crates and soles for boots. After the war, Germans were expelled from the Sudetenland, forcing Höfner to move to West Germany. The company initially moved to an ex-work camp at Möhrendorf in 1948, but soon became involved, along with others instrument makers and their families, in the development of a new township and factories in Bubenreuth. The new Höfner factory opened in 1950, and expanded three times between 1953 and 1960. Karl Höfner, the founder, lived to see the company's revival, and died in Bubenreuth in 1955. In 1964, the company built a further factory at Hagenau, about 5 km from Bubenreuth, to machine wood parts for assembly at Bubenreuth. They expanded the Hagenau factory twice in the 1970s.

The daughter of Walter Höfner, Gerhilde, began working for the company in the mid-1950s taking an active part in all aspects of management. Her husband, Christian Benker, joined the company in 1963. They together became the driving force for the company as Josef and Walter entered retirement in the 1970s.

=== Changes of ownership ===
In 1994, Höfner became part of the Boosey & Hawkes Group, and was able to expand and upgrade its facilities with the influx of cash. In 1997, the company moved from Bubenreuth to Hagenau.

After a near-bankruptcy in 2003 Boosey & Hawkes sold its musical instrument division (including the Höfner and Buffet Crampon companies) to the Music Group, a company formed by rescue buyout specialists Rutland Fund Management, for £33.2 million.

Höfner remained a part of this conglomerate until December 2004, when the Music Group sold the company to Klaus Schöller who had been the general manager of Höfner for many years, with his wife Ulrike Schrimpff, the finance director at Höfner along with Rob Olsen and Graham Stockley who were USA and UK partners. Klaus Schöller and Ulrike Schrimpff remained as the owners of the business until June 2026.

In June 2026, after filing for bankruptcy, the company was acquired by GEWA Music.

=== Distribution ===
==== Europe ====
The Höfner company has nearly always been responsible for its own distribution within Europe. The exceptions to this have been:

- The Netherlands where the distributor in the 1950s and 1960s was the Van Wouw company (which closed in the 1970s)
- Spain where the distributor is Keller
- The United Kingdom, in the 1950s, 1960s and early 1970s Höfner instruments were distributed by Selmer of London (not to be confused with The Selmer Company). In the mid-1990s Höfner became part of the Boosey & Hawkes Group and UK distribution was taken over by them until the sale of Höfner in 2004 when distribution switched to GNC, a company formed by Graham Stockley and Clive Guthrie. Today electric guitars are distributed by Barnes and Mullins while classical guitars and stringed instruments are still distributed by Clive Guthrie.

==== United States ====
EMMC based in NJ was the distributor for bass guitars for many years until Boosey & Hawkes bought Höfner in 1994.

Boosey & Hawkes took over distribution from 1995 to 2003. During these years the improvements of quality and brand exposure were significant. The overall bass and guitar lines were redesigned and new successful 6-string jazz guitar models were created and introduced in late 1999.

The Music Group, a Venture Capital Company took over Boosey & Hawkes from 2003 until 2004 when the Höfner company was purchased via a management buyout.

In 2005, Höfner's United States distribution was picked up by Classic Musical Instruments (CMI) in Kenosha, WI. CMI ceased trading in 2012 and distribution passed to Musical Distributors Group (MDG) in New Jersey. In late 2018 MDG merged with Adam Hall North America and is the current USA distributor.

Rob Olsen – 1998–current: Rob Olsen worked at Boosey & Hawkes as Höfner Product Manager in late 1998 and remains responsible for USA distribution for Adam Hall. He designed or co-designed, with Klaus Schoeller and Graham Stockley, many key Höfner models, managed overall quality, and increased visibility of the company (especially from 1998 to 2012). Rob Olsen era Höfner models include: HAS acoustic series, Jazzica Custom, Verythin Classic, The New President, The Vice-President, Verythin Standard, The Chancellor, The Club Bass reissue, The 50th Anniversary Violin bass, Club 40 John Lennon limited edition, Violin finish guitars and basses, Colorama reissue, H5 jazz guitars and many others. Rob may be best known for creating the flagship Icon/Ignition series basses and guitars. He was responsible for negotiations and creation of the Ed Sullivan Series basses, Guitar Hero and Beatles Rockband connections.

Rob Olsen opened and managed the Höfner Custom Shop (still in operation), which produces special instruments and colours for shops and artists, including Wilco, Lenny Kravitz, Bruno Mars, Cheap Trick, Bon Jovi, Tesla, Sheryl Crow, and others. The most famous custom shop model may be the Paul McCartney Jubilee bass that Paul used for the Concert for the Queen in 2012, where Paul sported a painted in a transparent coloured Union Jack flag custom shop bass.

Rob Olsen along with Graham Stockley in the UK (and later based in Germany at the Höfner workshop) were the key players in exposing and bringing the brand to desired status by creating quality features and models, artist- relations and signings of visible artists (officially with Paul McCartney), Cheap Trick, Bon Jovi, Tesla, Wilco and many others. They also achieved rapid dealer growth and the creation of the ad campaigns during the USA Höfner brand launch years.

== Selected models ==
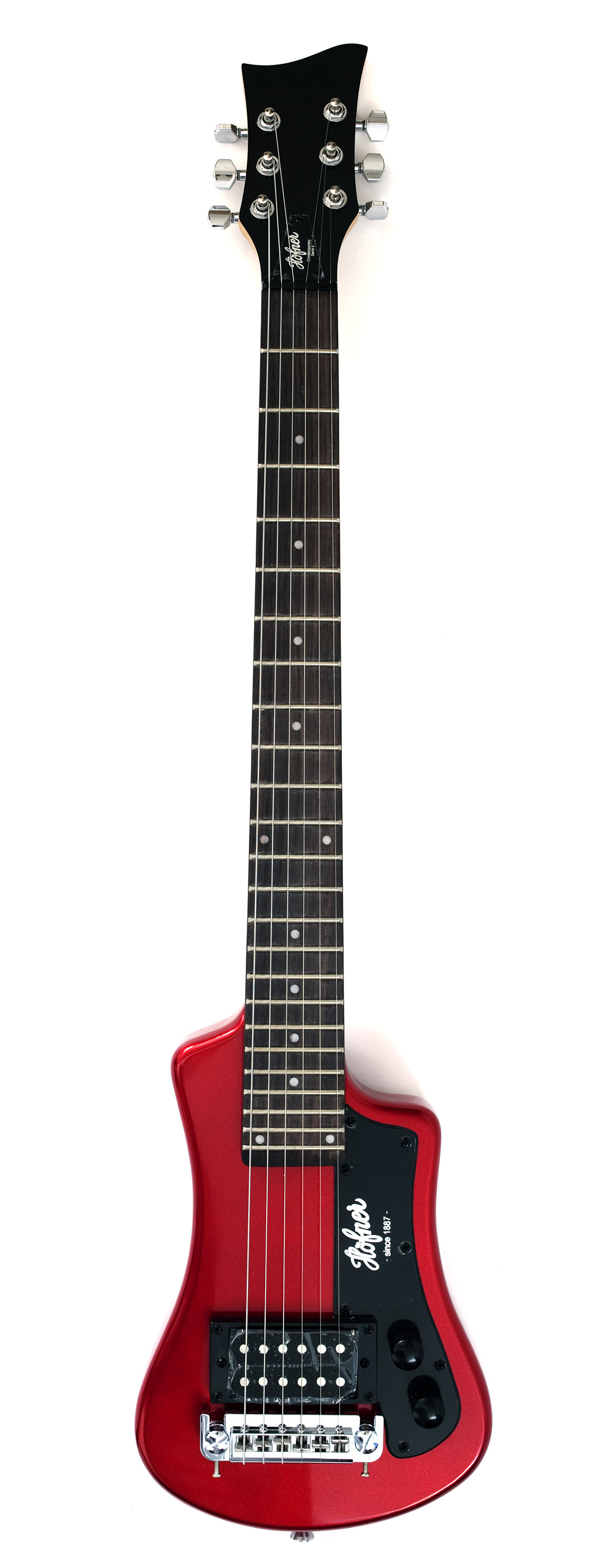
Höfner Shorty

The Selmer company devised names for these instruments for the UK market. Elsewhere, they were known by model numbers.

- The Ambassador. A thinline semi-acoustic with two florentine cutaways.
- The Chancellor. A high-end archtop guitar available in limited numbers.
- Club 40, 50 and 60. Hollow bodied electric guitars without soundholes. Still manufactured, the current Clubs have Gibson Les Paul style bodyshape.
- The original Coloramas were inexpensive semi-solid body electric guitars with plywood construction. The current Chinese made ones are solid bodies with retro styling.
- The committee was the top-of-the-range archtop.
- The Congress, a non-cutaway archtop guitar. Early models had a 12th fret neck join.
- The President: a family of mid-range archtops, with a single cutaway.
- The Senator: a family of archtops, with many variations.
- The Shorty. A relatively recent (1982) travel guitar Now made in China.
- The Verithin. A semi-acoustic guitar with a 30mm deep body. They produced regular, Bigsby and stereo versions.
- Violin guitar. Introduced subsequently to the violin bass.
- The V Series solid body electric guitars.
- The Galaxie solid body electric guitars.

== Höfner users ==
=== Beatles ===
The Beatles guitarists George Harrison and John Lennon used Höfner electric guitars. Harrison used a President model and a Club 40 early on in his association with the group. Lennon's first electric guitar was a Club 40 model that he purchased in 1959 from Hessy's music store in Liverpool. He used this for about one year, then bought a Rickenbacker "Capri" model. The Club 40 was briefly loaned to Paul McCartney and then it was sold. The band's original bassist Stuart Sutcliffe played a Höfner 500/5 Bass.

==== Paul McCartney ====
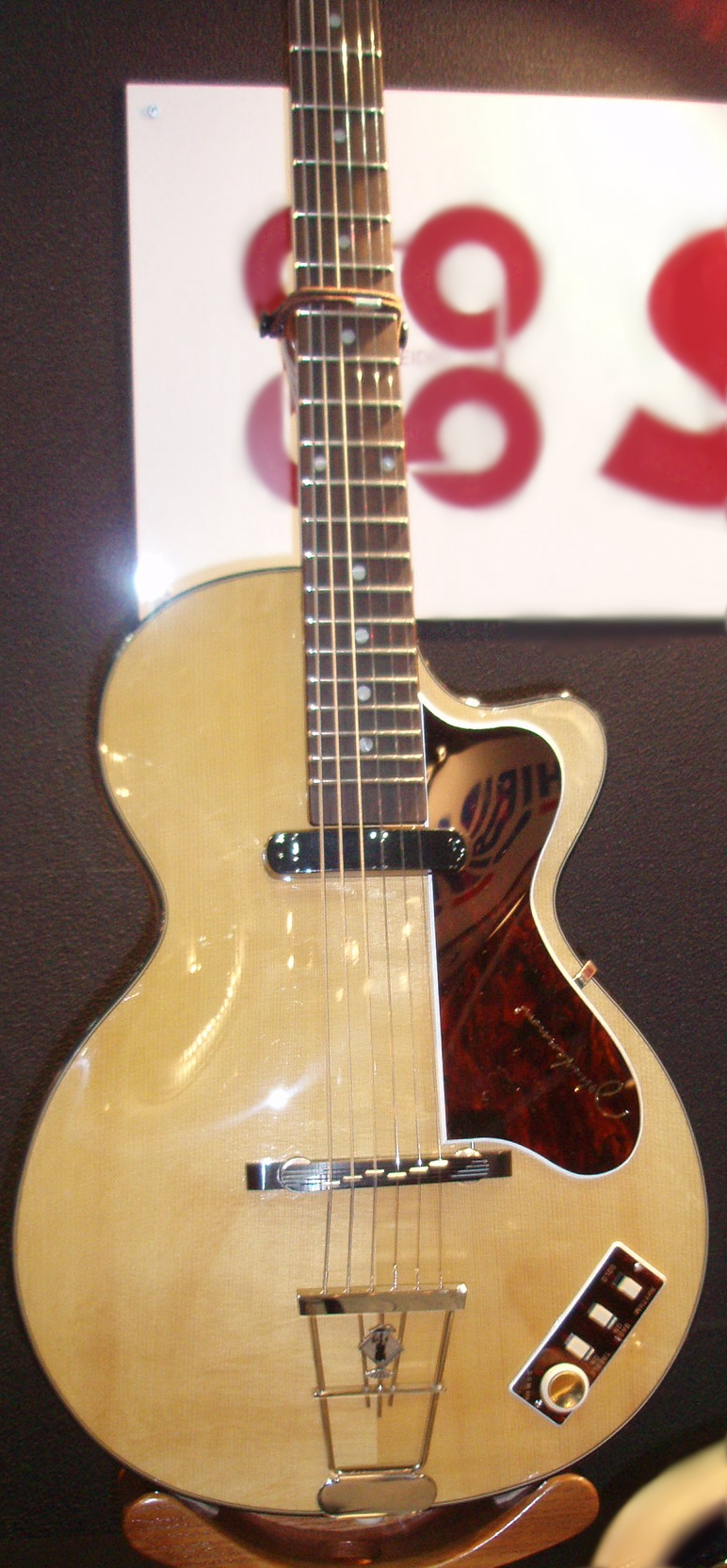
A Club 40 as used by John Lennon

The company is most famous through its association with Beatles songwriter, singer, and instrumentalist Paul McCartney, who is a longtime user of the Höfner 500/1 model hollow-body electric bass, first manufactured in 1956.

McCartney played two left-handed 500/1 basses during most of the group's career—a 1961 model with pick-ups mounted close together towards the neck, and a 1963 model, with the second pick-up mounted closer to the bridge. McCartney used the 1961 bass until the recording of With The Beatles in late 1963, when he got his second 500/1. McCartney used his 1963 bass almost exclusively during The Beatles' touring career, using his 1961 bass (repaired and refinished in 1964) as a backup. By 1965 McCartney had begun using a Rickenbacker bass in the studio—but he did bring out his 1961 model for the "Revolution" promo film in 1968, and for the documentary Let It Be the following year. In 1972, the 1961 bass was stolen, and was only recovered in September 2023. McCartney used his newer Höfner for the remainder of the film, including the famous rooftop performance. Though he continued to primarily use his Rickenbacker throughout the 1970s and 1980s, McCartney began using the 1963 Höfner extensively again on the 1989 album Flowers in the Dirt and continues to use it to the present day.

=== Höfner 500/1 bass players ===
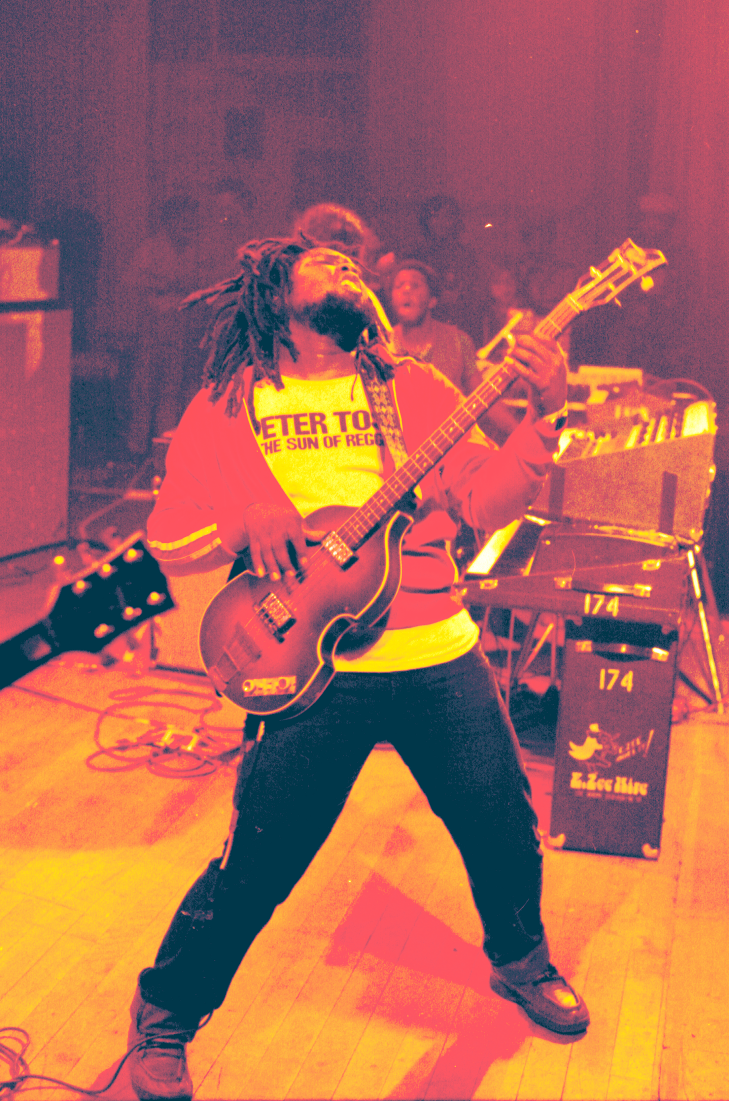
Robbie Shakespeare using a 500/1 in 1978

- Paul McCartney from The Beatles
- Romain Labaye
- Nick Allbrook from Tame Impala
- Kevin Parker from Tame Impala
- Chaz Bundick from Toro Y Moi
- Guy Berryman, Coldplay in Christmas Lights
- Debra Clinger of The Clingers
- Jim Creeggan from Barenaked Ladies
- Dale Davis with Amy Winehouse
- Bob Glaub
- Errol Holt
- Rebecca Lynn Howard with Steven Tyler
- Andy Hummel from Big Star
- Ken Stringfellow from Big Star
- Tony Jackson from The Searchers
- Alan Jardine of The Beach Boys on Carl and the Passions – "So Tough"
- Laura Lee of Khruangbin has one as back-up
- Carl Wilson of The Beach Boys on "Lei'd in Hawaii" (1967)
- Terry Manning with Alex Chilton
- Satomi Matsuzaki from Deerhoof
- Sid McCartney from The Punkles
- Cone McCaslin from Sum 41 on Screaming Bloody Murder
- Jack O'Brien from The Bright Light Social Hour on Space Is Still the Place (2015)
- Tom Petersson, Cheap Trick
- John Power from The La's in the meeting that had the band in 2005
- Michael Rhodes
- Robbie Shakespeare with Peter Tosh
- Leland Sklar, The Section (band) and studio bassist
- Christian Wargo from Fleet Foxes
- Brian Wheat, Tesla
- Chris Wood (jazz musician)
- Michael Hirano Culross (with Dan Povenmire and Keep Left)

=== Höfner 500/2 Club bass players ===
- Nicolas Godin of Air (French Band)
- Justin Meldal-Johnsen a prolific session musician
- Tom Petty performed with Mudcrutch and appears with a 500/1 in the liner notes for Playback
- Tony Scherr during a live Bill Frisell performance
- Tina Weymouth from Talking Heads
- Phil Volk of Paul Revere and the Raiders

=== Höfner guitar users ===
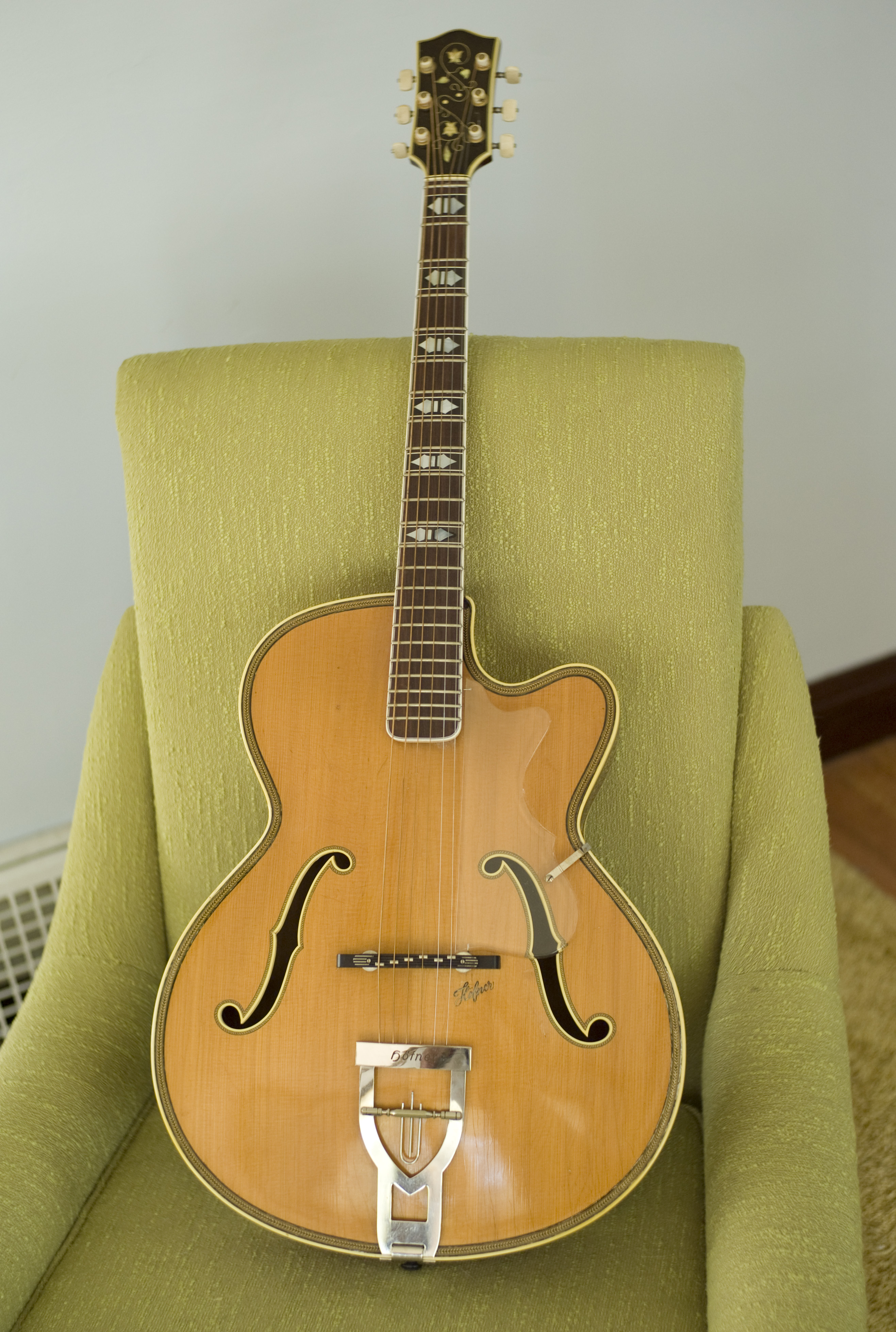
1953 model 465s acoustic archtop

- Bert Weedon, now best known for his tutorial works, had a variety of Höfners.
- Hank Marvin's first guitar was a Congress.
- Hugh Cornwell ex member of The Stranglers used a Höfner Razerwood S7L solid-body.
- Eric Clapton learned to play on a Höfner acoustic.
- The young Ritchie Blackmore played a club 50.
- A Senator was Peter Green's first real guitar.
- Keith Richards of The Rolling Stones traded in a stack of records to purchase his first guitar, which was a hollow-body Höfner cut away.
- Folk Baroque pioneer Davy Graham played a Congress.
- Mark Knopfler's first guitar was a V2 solid.
- At the age of 13, Jimmy Page made his first televised appearance in 1957 on BBC1 playing a Höfner President.
- The Stone Roses' John Squire used a Höfner semi-acoustic guitar (featuring a self-applied Jackson Pollock-style paintjob).
- The Auteurs' Luke Haines uses a Committee.
- Jamie Hince' of The Kills
- Early Beatles bassist Stuart Sutcliffe used prize money he won in an art competition (50 guineas) to purchase a Höfner President bass.
- Albert Lee's first guitar was a Höfner President acoustic.
- Tav Falco has played only a Höfner violin guitar, with built-in factory fuzztone, since 1980.
- Richard Thompson's first electric guitar was a V3 in a sunburst pattern.
- Tonny Koeswoyo used Höfner Galaxy Series & Verythin Series
- John Lennon of The Beatles bought a Club 40 as his first electric guitar in 1959.
- David Dever used a Höfner VT to record Spoken Tones debut album in 2023.
- Chris Rea's first guitar was a Höfner Verithin 3, which he played until 1979.
- Bernie Marsden's first electric guitar was a Colorama.
- Martin Taylor used a Hofner Verithin, bought from a music shop in Harlow UK when he was a teenager, early to mid 60s
