= Luby (Cheb District) =

- Town
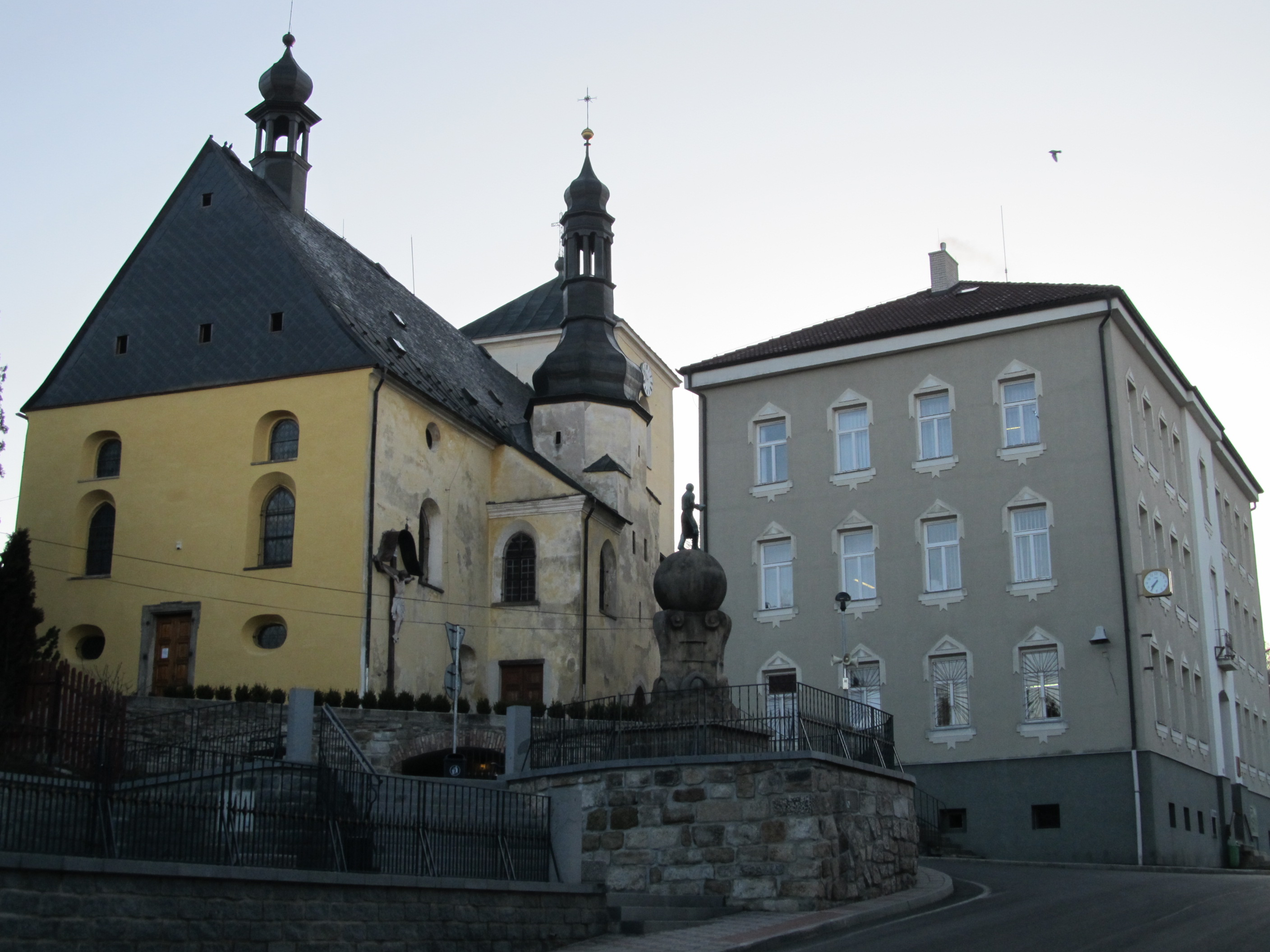
- Church of Saint Andrew and town hall

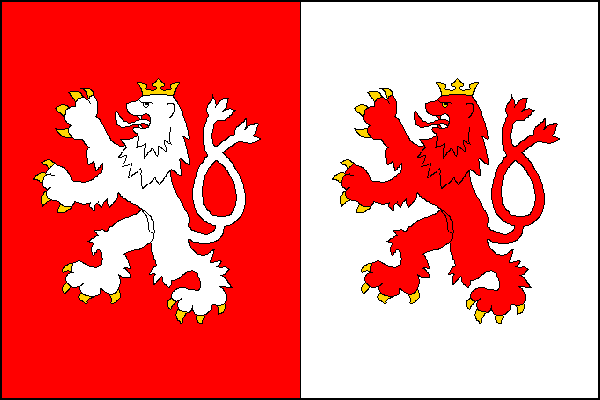
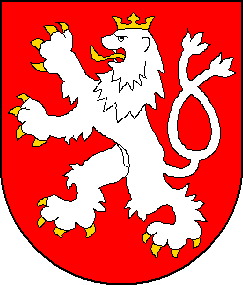
- Flag Coat of arms

- Location in the Czech Republic
- Coordinates: 50°15′9″N 12°24′22″E
- Country: Czech Republic
- Region: Karlovy Vary
- District: Cheb
- First mentioned: 1158

Government
  - Mayor: Vladimír Vorm

Area
  - Total: 30.69 km^{2} (11.85 sq mi)
- Elevation: 518 m (1,699 ft)

Population (2026-01-01)
  - Total: 2,147
  - Density: 69.96/km^{2} (181.2/sq mi)
- Time zone: UTC+1 (CET)
  - Summer (DST): UTC+2 (CEST)
- Postal code: 351 37
- Website: www.mestoluby.cz

Luby (Czech pronunciation: [ˈlubɪ]; German: Schönbach) is a town in Cheb District in the Karlovy Vary Region of the Czech Republic. It has about 2,100 inhabitants. The town proper is located on the Lubinka Stream in the Fichtel Mountains.

Luby was probably founded in the first half of the 12th century and became a town in 1319. The town is known for its violin-making industry. The main landmark of Luby is the Church of Saint Andrew.

== Administrative division ==
Luby consists of four municipal parts (in brackets population according to the 2021 census):

- Luby (1,902)
- Dolní Luby (21)
- Horní Luby (32)
- Opatov (57)

== Etymology ==
Until 1947, the German name Schönbach (meaning 'beautiful stream') was used both in Czech and German. In 1947, the name of the town was changed to Luby. It is a plural of the Czech word lub, which is a term for a lateral wooden strip connecting the top and bottom boards of a violin ('rib').

== Geography ==
Luby is located about 19 kilometres (12 mi) north of Cheb and 32 km (20 mi) west of Karlovy Vary, on the border with Germany. Most of the municipal territory lies in the Fichtel Mountains, but it also extends into the Ore Mountains in the east and to the Cheb Basin in the south. The highest point is the hill Strážiště at 680 m (2,231 ft) above sea level. The Lubinka Stream originates here and then flows through the town proper.

== History ==
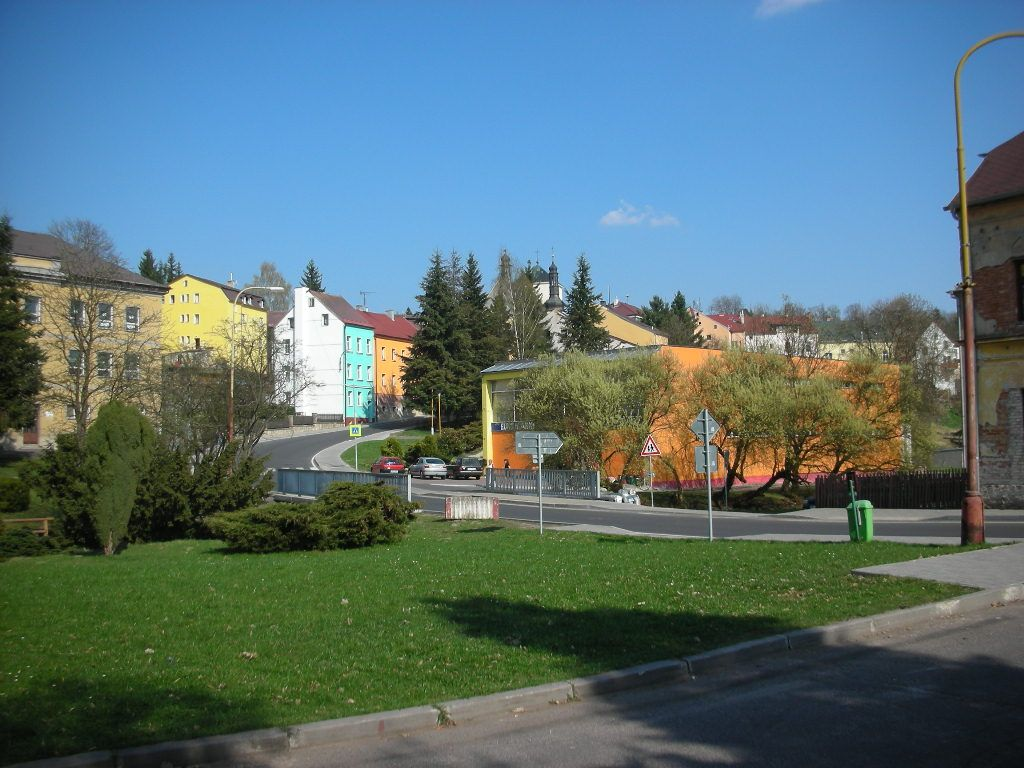
Centre of Luby

The area was probably settled between 1100 and 1140. The first written mention of Luby is from 1158. In 1185, it was mentioned as a property of the Waldsassen Abbey. Construction of a church started in 1188. The village was promoted to a town in 1319. In 1354, it became a royal property.

During the mid-13th century, mercury ore, particularly the vermilion variety, was mined in the area of Horní Luby. In the 16th century, the ore was regarded as the most important in Central Europe. In 1536, about 200 miners had produced about 13.5 tons of cinnabar from several local mines.

During the Thirty Years' War, the mining came to a complete standstill. In the latter half of the 17th century, Schönbach flourished as a centre of violin making.

In 1867–1918, Schönbach was part of the Austro-Hungarian Empire. The village was located within the boundaries of the Eger District created by the Austria-Hungary monarchy. In 1899–1900, Schönbach gained access to electricity and the railroad, which helped the development of the industry.

The Austro-Hungarian Empire collapsed in 1918, after World War I, and Schönbach became part of Czechoslovakia. In 1929, about 1,500 Schönbach craftsmen were employed making string instruments. From 1938 to 1945, following the Munich Agreement, the western region of Czechoslovakia with Luby was annexed by Nazi Germany and administered as part of the Reichsgau Sudetenland.

After World War II, the German-speaking inhabitants were expelled. Most of them, including the instrument makers, settled in Bubenreuth to restore their industry.

== Demographics ==
Historical population

Year	Pop.	±%
1869	4,072	—
1880	4,534	+11.3%
1890	5,404	+19.2%
1900	5,962	+10.3%
1910	6,785	+13.8%

Year	Pop.	±%
1921	6,262	−7.7%
1930	6,522	+4.2%
1950	2,515	−61.4%
1961	2,283	−9.2%
1970	2,551	+11.7%

Year	Pop.	±%
1980	2,644	+3.6%
1991	2,509	−5.1%
2001	2,478	−1.2%
2011	2,197	−11.3%
2021	2,012	−8.4%

Source: Censuses

== Economy ==
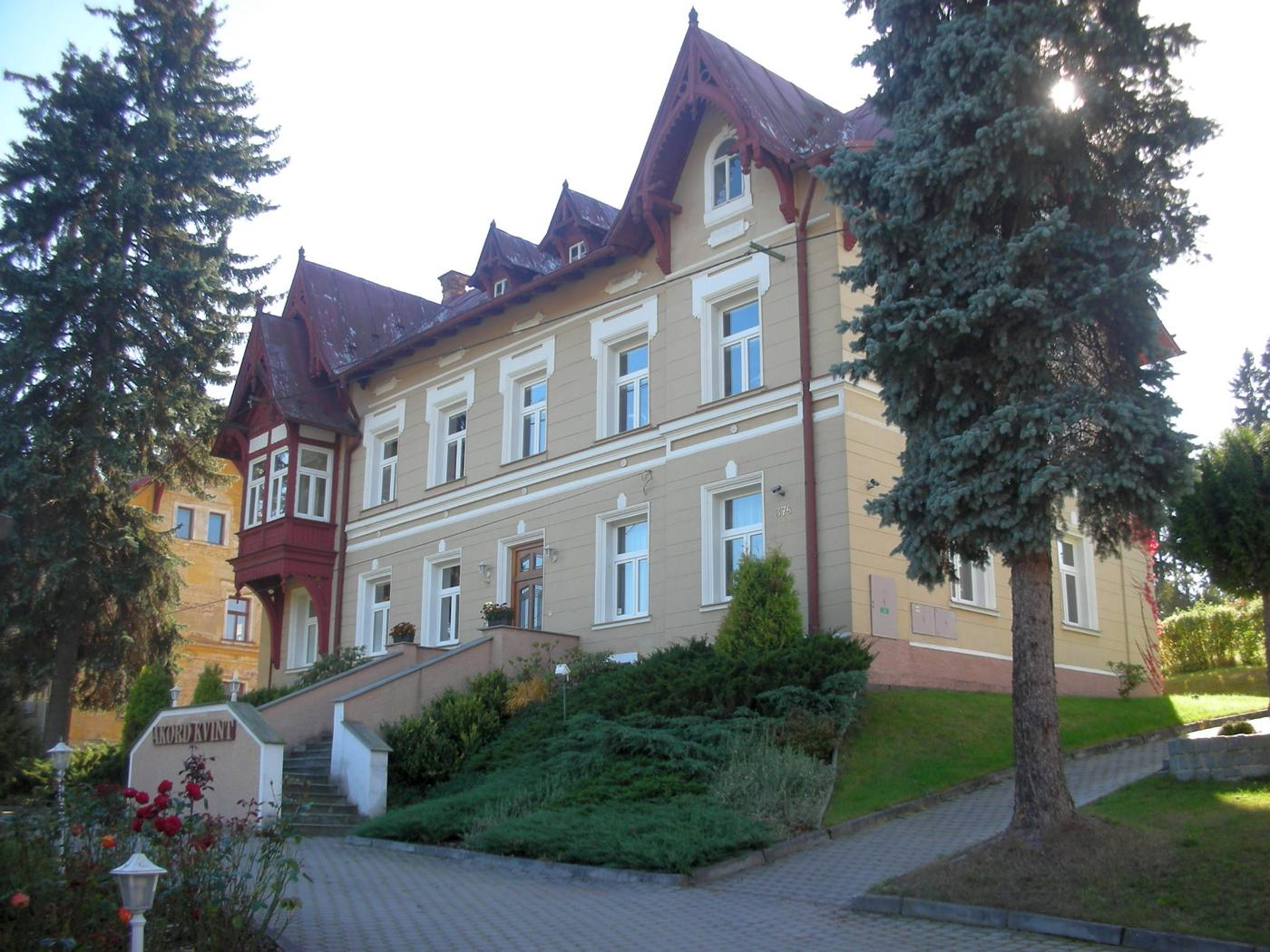
Akord Kvint company, one of manufacturers of violins

There were several notable luthiers and music instrument companies in Luby, including Höfner, Hoyer Guitars, John Juzek, and Plachta, Sander and Schuster families. Framus company was also founded here. Before World War II, Luby was the largest centre of violin production in the world.

In 1948, when the communist party took power in Czechoslovakia, the production of music instruments was nationalised and unified into a single Luby-based company called Cremona (part of Československé hudební nástroje in 1965–1992) that had been in existence since 1920. All manufactures and small workshops were part of this company. In 1992, Cremona was privatised and renamed Strunal CZ, a.s., which since was exported under the label of Josef Jan Dvořák (for bowed instruments) and Strunal or Amada (for guitars). Strunal filed for bankruptcy in 2020. Several smaller companies continue the tradition in the town.

== Transport ==
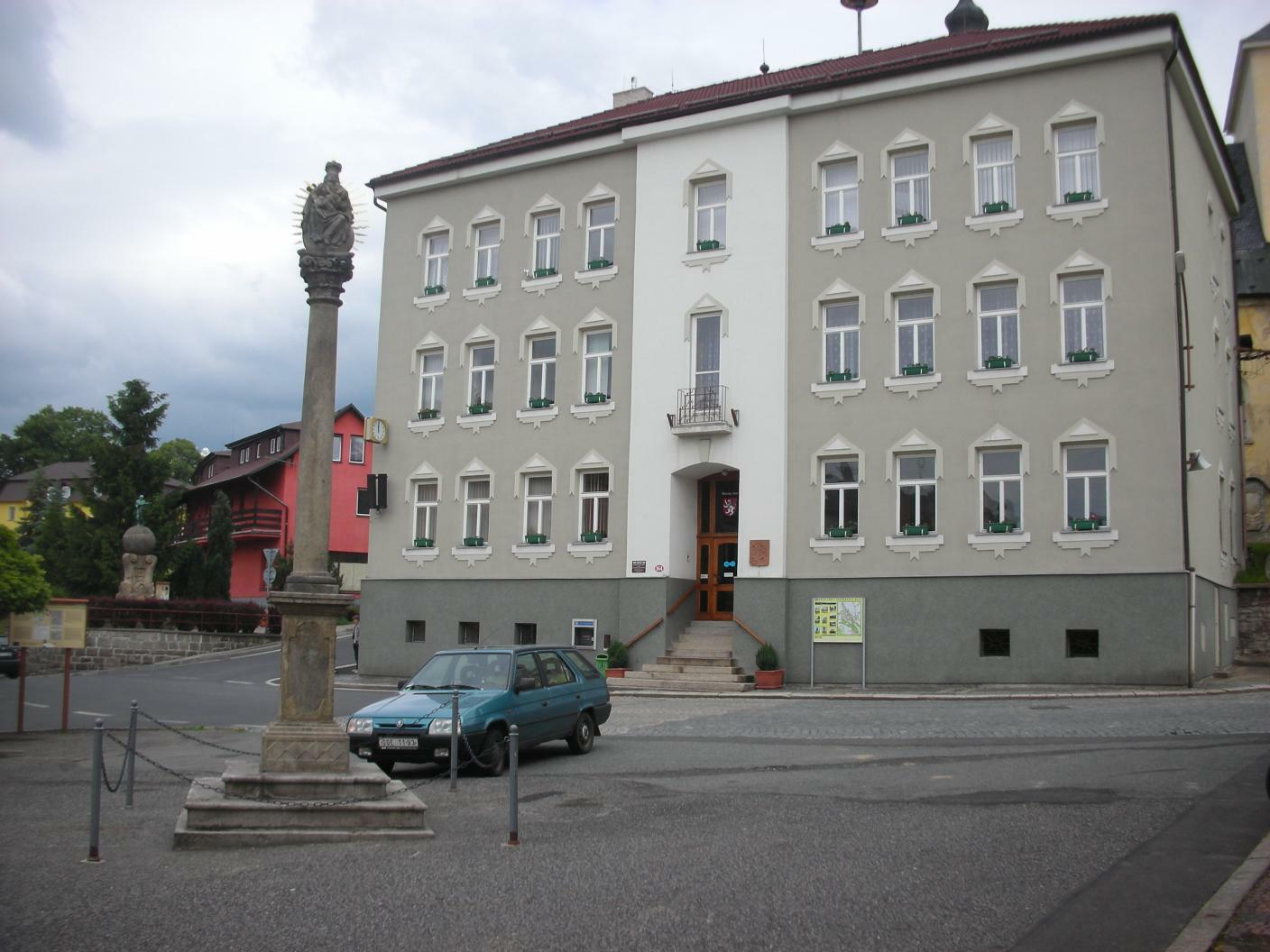
Town hall

Luby is the start of a railway line to Cheb.

== Education ==
From 1873 to 2005, the Violin Making School was located in Luby. In 2005, it was moved to Cheb.

== Sights ==
The main landmark of Luby is the Church of Saint Andrew. It was built in the Romanesque style around 1220. From this period, the tower has been preserved. Rest of the church was rebuilt to its present Baroque form during the 16th–18th centuries.

The second notable monument is the Chapel of the Virgin Mary. It is an octagonal cemetery chapel, built in the Baroque style in 1714.

== Notable people ==
- John Juzek (1892 – c. 1965), exporter of orchestral string instruments; worked and died here
- Herta Huber (1926–2018), German writer and poet

== Twin towns – sister cities ==
Luby is twinned with:

- Bubenreuth, Germany
- Markneukirchen, Germany
