= Hoyer Guitars =

German guitar manufacturer

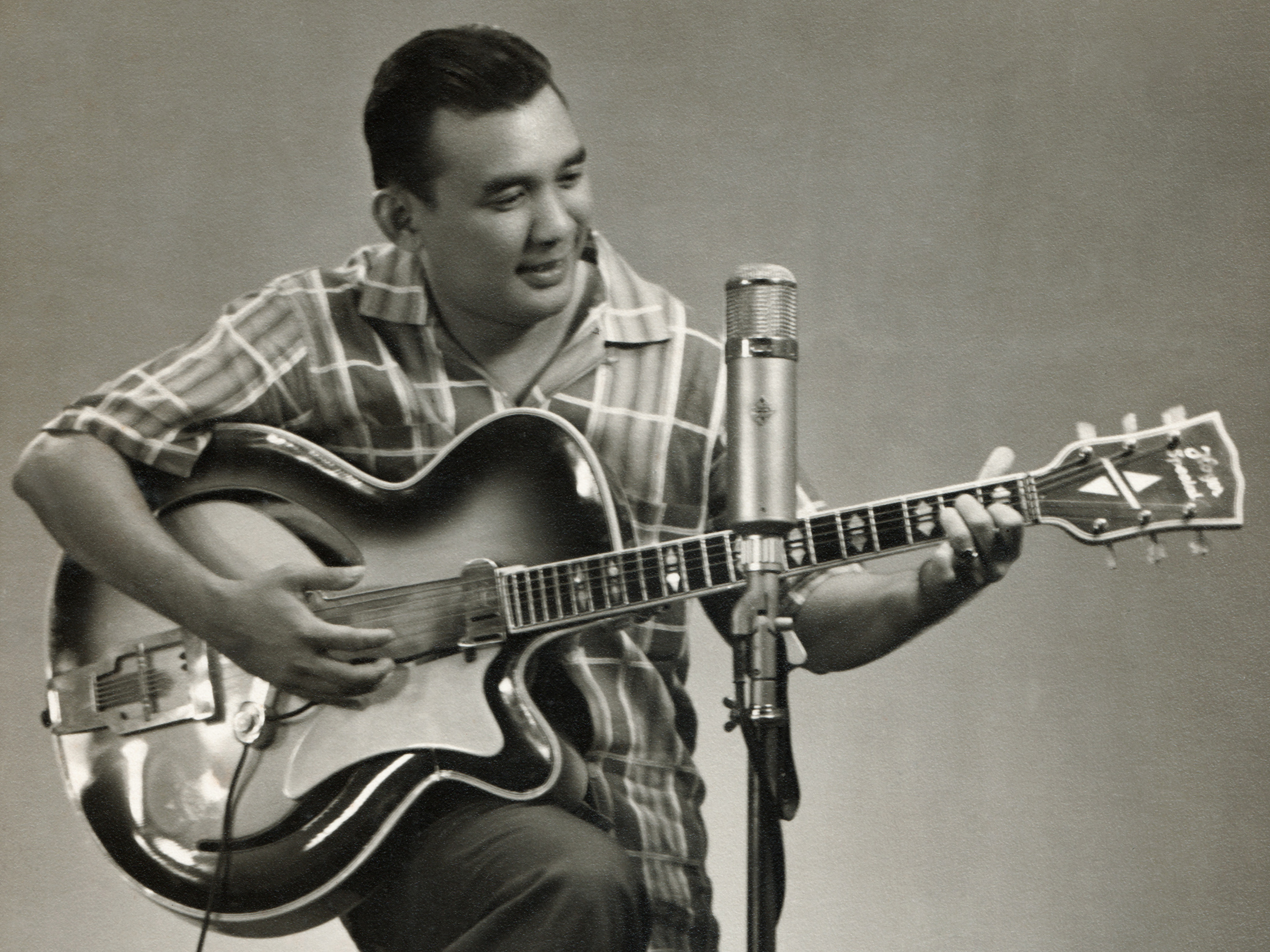
Indonesian artist Gordon Tobing using a Hoyer Special in the 1960s

Hoyer Guitars is a German manufacturer of guitars.

== History ==
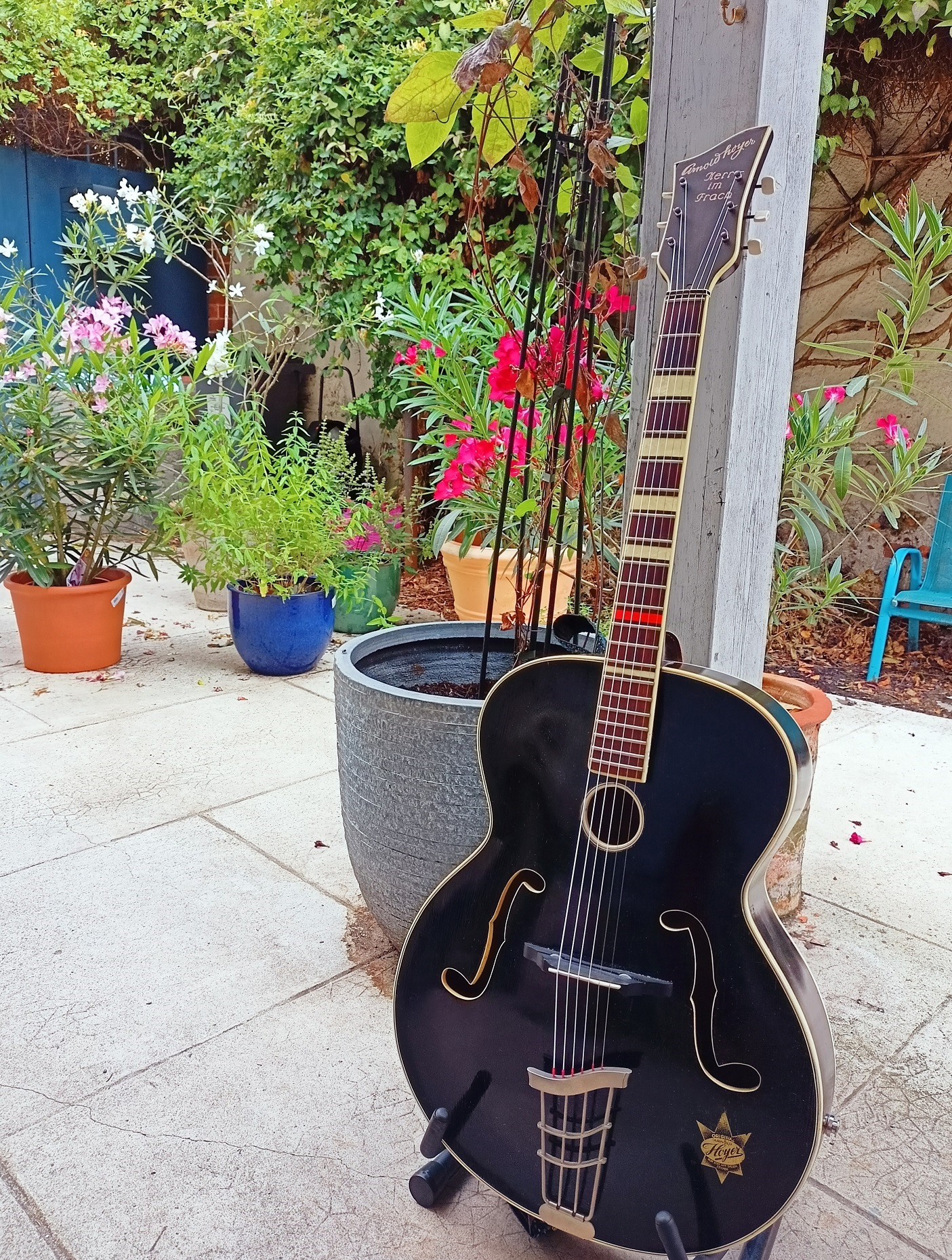
Arnold Hoyer "herr im frack", 1950's

Established in 1874 by Franz Hoyer in his workshop in Schönbach (now Luby in the Czech Republic). Hoyer began by making lutes and zithers, and then changed to classic and folk guitars. The company was continued by his son Joseph Hoyer. In 1945, the family left Schönbach and settled in Tennenlohe near Erlangen in Bavaria, Germany. Joseph Hoyer's son Arnold reorganised the Hoyer company and the brand soon became known for its good quality. Among the most notable users of the Hoyer guitar was English guitarist Eric Clapton, who received an acoustic Hoyer guitar for his thirteenth birthday, but the inexpensive steel-stringed instrument was difficult to play and he briefly lost interest. Two years later Clapton picked it up again and started playing consistently. Following Arnold Hoyer's death in 1967, his son Walter took over the Hoyer company and focused more on electric and folk guitars.
