= Czecho Slovak Commercial Corp. =

Czecho Slovak Commercial Corporation of America was an American importer of products from Czechoslovakia. The company was founded in 1917. In October 1922, the company changed its name to Penn Commercial Corporation of America, Inc.

== Directors, executives, and employees ==
Founding incorporators

1. Anthony S. Ambrose (1867–1941), president and director
2. Ivan Bielek (1886–1943), vice-president and director (signatory party to the Pittsburgh Agreement)
3. Clement Ihrisky (1876–1940)
4. Michael J. Bosak, Jr. (1894–1979)

Employoee

1. Robert Juzek (1894–1975), secretary in 1920

== Addresses ==
- 1920: 59 Pearl Street, New York City
- 1922: 151 Fifth Avenue, New York City
