= John Juzek =

Czech music instruments merchant

John Juzek (né Janek Jůzek, aka Jan, aka Johann; 1892 – c. 1965) was a Czech merchant. He was known in North America as an exporter of violins, violas, cellos, and double basses made and labeled under his anglicized name, "John Juzek," crafted mostly by guilds and various independent makers in the Bohemia region of the Czechoslovakia and Germany border.

The John Juzek trademark, brand, and line of orchestral string instruments endures today through the original one hundred and six-year-old family-owned wholesaler, Metropolitan Music Co., currently owned and managed by the heirs of Robert Juzek (1894–1975), a founding partner and brother of John Juzek.

== Life ==
Juzek was born in 1892 in Písek. He died in c. 1965 in Luby.

== String instruments ==
Labels

The John Juzek imprint on the labels inside the F-holes reflect an import-to-the-U.S trade name, not the craftsman. The city and country imprint reflects the location of Juzek's shops, mostly in Prague before World War II. From 1920 through the 1970s, the craftsmen were from the Bohemia region on both sides of the German-Czechoslovak border. Extant instruments from the 1920s have labels reading "Jan Juzek," the Czech version of his given name, yet other parts of the label, "Violin Maker in Prague," are spelled in English.

Label colors

Black labels indicate that the instrument was made by an outside vendor. Multicolored labels were used for violins.

Instruments

Janek Juzek, himself, was a violin maker, and crafted instruments in his own shop in Prague sometime between 1910 and 1920, using wood from torn down houses and churches, when he could find it, otherwise from the Carpathian Mountains, which formed the eastern border of Czechoslovakia. For the Master Art series, Juzek adopted standard patterns of classic violin luthiers, including:

1. Stradivarius
2. Guarnerius: Guarnerian outline, soundholes slightly elongated; Stradivarian scroll
3. Nicolò Gagliano
4. Guadagnini
5. Testore
6. Maggini

As demand for string instruments in North America]increased, John Juzek purchased violins violas, cellos, and double bases from craftsmen, mostly from Schönbach, and, according to advertising literature of Czechoslovak to build instruments fitting his specifications.

Manufacturing and export

In the early 1900s, John Juzek ran a factory in Schönbach, Bohemia (renamed Luby in 1946), where the John Juzek labeled instruments were crafted. Juzek also was the export merchant for independent craftsmen, for whom the instruments were also labeled with the John Juzek name.

Export and distribution

The instruments were sold in North America, mostly in the New York City area, exclusively through Metropolitan Music Co. (originally named Czechoslovak Musical Instruments Company), a New York City firm founded in 1920 by Robert J. Juzek (1894–1975) Robert's four brothers were involved in the business in various capacities:

1. John Juzek
2. William Juzek (1905–1942)
3. Jerry Juzek (né Jaromir Juzek; 1901–1991)
4. Charles Juzek (né Karel Juzek; 1896–1979)

Before the founding of Czechoslovak Musical Instruments Company, Robert Juzek had traveled to New York aboard the SS Imperator, arriving March 2, 1920, as a secretary for the Czecho Slovak Commercial Corp., located at 59 Pearl Street, New York City, a Czechoslovak exporter of orchestral instruments.

By the 1930s, the Czechoslovak Musical Instruments Company in New York City was selling violins, violas, cellos, double basses, mandolins, banjo mandolins, ukuleles, banjo ukuleles, tenor ukuleles, tiples, banjos, tenor banjos, and guitars.

After World War II ended, John Juzek no longer was connected with Metropolitan Music Co. Robert Juzek began making all the contracts directly with the shops. When Robert Juzek died in 1975, his son, Bob Juzek (né Robert Juzek; born 1938) became the president. Metropolitan Music Co. is now managed by Bob's two sons, Rob and Adam, the third generation family of the founder. The current John Juzek string instruments are made in Europe and China.

=== Metropolitan Music Co. ===
Robert Juzek — USA

Czechoslovak Musical Instruments Company

- 1920 to about 1932

1342 Second Avenue (between 70th & 71st Streets), New York City

- 1932 to about 1937

Metropolitan Music Co.

1358 First Avenue (between 72nd & 73 Streets), New York City
(name change occurred after to the move, before 1935)

- 1937 to 1974

222 Fourth Avenue (between 32nd & 33rd Streets), New York City

- 1974 to 1977

Westwood, New Jersey

- 1977 to present

Stowe, Vermont

Metropolitan Music Co. hired and sponsored several immigrant luthiers, including:

- Alfons Frantisek Vavra (born 1936) — immigrated from Schönbach to the United States in 1968.
- Peter Eibert (1926–2013) — trained by Heinrich Lang in Nuremberg from the age of 14; he moved to New York in the 1960s to work for the Juzek Family; Eibert is a Master Violin and Bow maker as well as a restorer of Violin Family Instruments; he currently has a violin shop in Garnerville, New York
- John Sipko (born 1953) — worked for the Juzek family, then later worked for Jack Loeb at Ideal Instrument Co. Inc.

== Publications of Metropolitan Music Co. ==
Books

- The Simplicity of Violin Playing, by Robert Juzek, Metropolitan Music Co.

Book 1 (©1948) OCLC 393114, 693588837, 743346229
Book 2 (©1950) OCLC 23895025

- All violin technique: complete method for all violinists, from beginning to highest artistic perfection, by Robert Juzek, Metropolitan Music Co. (©1951) OCLC 1687599
- Professional hints on repair, Metropolitan Music Co. (©1948) OCLC 224056797

Catalogs

- Czechoslovak Musical Instruments Co. (1920)

32 pages of violins, bows, parts, strings, etc.

- Czechoslovak Music Co., Delux hardbound catalog (1931)

166 pages; includes Eugene Ormandy violin testimonial

- Czechoslovak Musical Instruments Co. (1931)

161 pages; lacking pps. 51–52, 97–98, 127–130, and 143–144; printed by J. Schmidt, Markneukirchen, Saxony; features the "famous John Juzek Hand made violins", also Koehler woodwind instruments, plucked strings, percussion instruments, etc.

- Metropolitan Music Co. Musical Merchandise: Wholesale Catalogue No. 10, (1935) Smithsonian #45 OCLC 441855139, 58784198

210 pages, 9.5 by 12 inches.; black and white, and color illustrations; includes illustrations of violins, accordions, guitars, banjos, ukuleles, mandolins, clarinets, drums, bassoons, whistles, cellos, clarinets, English horns, French horns, harmonicas, clarinets, oboes, piccolos, pitch pipes, saxophones, sousaphones, trombones, trumpets, violins, and zithers; features bowed stringed instruments made by John Juzek of Prague

- Metropolitan Music Co. Catalogue No. 19. (1960), Smithsonian #221

== Notable musicians who own John Juzek instruments ==
Jazz

- Reid Anderson, double bass (c. 1930s)
- John Patitucci, double bass (c. 1935; Czechoslovakia)
- Ron Carter, double bass
- Christian McBride, double bass
- Steve Bailey, double bass
- Shanir Ezra Blumenkranz, double bass, 1962 Juzek 5-string with low B
- Mark Helias, double bass, 1930 Juzek
- Avery Sharpe, double bass
- Leon Lee Dorsey, double bass, c. 1910s
- David Finck, double bass
- Kenny Davis, double bass
- Lynn Seaton, double bass
- Buster Williams, double bass

Bluegrass

- Viktor Krauss, double bass (1948; Prague)
- Todd Phillips

The Finer violin cornered basses with Juzek labels were made by the Wilfer family: Anton Wilfer (1901–1976) (pre-WWII), Wenzl B. Wilfer (post-WWII thru the 1970s) — and now Emanuel Wilfer. They were first made in Czechoslovakia; but after WWII, they moved across over the border to Germany. The Gamba shaped basses as well as the plywood basses were supplied by the Benedict Lang I shop in Schönbach pre-World War II and B. Lang II in Mittenwald post-World War II.

Some of the Master Art Copy violins and cellos imprinted with higher numbers dated in the 1950s and 1960s were made by Roman Teller (died 1974), who moved to Erlangen, West Germany after World War II.

== Juzek family ==
John Juzek managed the production and export of Bohemian crafted string instruments to New York City in the aftermath of World War I, through duress of the Great Depression of the early 1930s, the subsequent Nazi occupation that began in 1939, and World War II.

John Juzek and his five siblings were born in Písek (now in the Czech Republic). In 1921, Jan Juzek was single and resided in Písek. In 1930, he was married to Ella (born 1909 in Písek) and together they lived in Schönbach. In 1936, he was living in Kolín.
