= Herta Huber =

German poet & writer

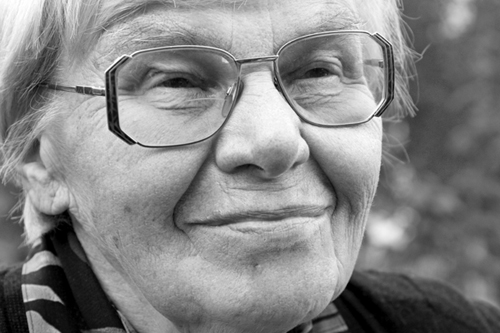

Herta Huber (24 January 1926 – 8 April 2018) was a German writer and poet.

== Life and career ==
Huber was born in Schönbach, Czechoslovakia on 24 January 1926. She was known for writing in the Egerland dialect, originating from what is now part of Bohemia in the Czech Republic. Huber was awarded several commendations of the Sudetendeutsche Landsmannschaft for her literary contributions. She resided in Immenstadt, and died on 8 April 2018, at the age of 92.

== Book publications ==
- Stutzala
- Spraal u Spriezl
- Fröiha u heint
- Maria Kulm - Historie (1983)
- ... aber Brennessel wachst schneller (1991)
- Kinderzeit im Egerland (1999)
