= Bubenreuth =

- Municipality
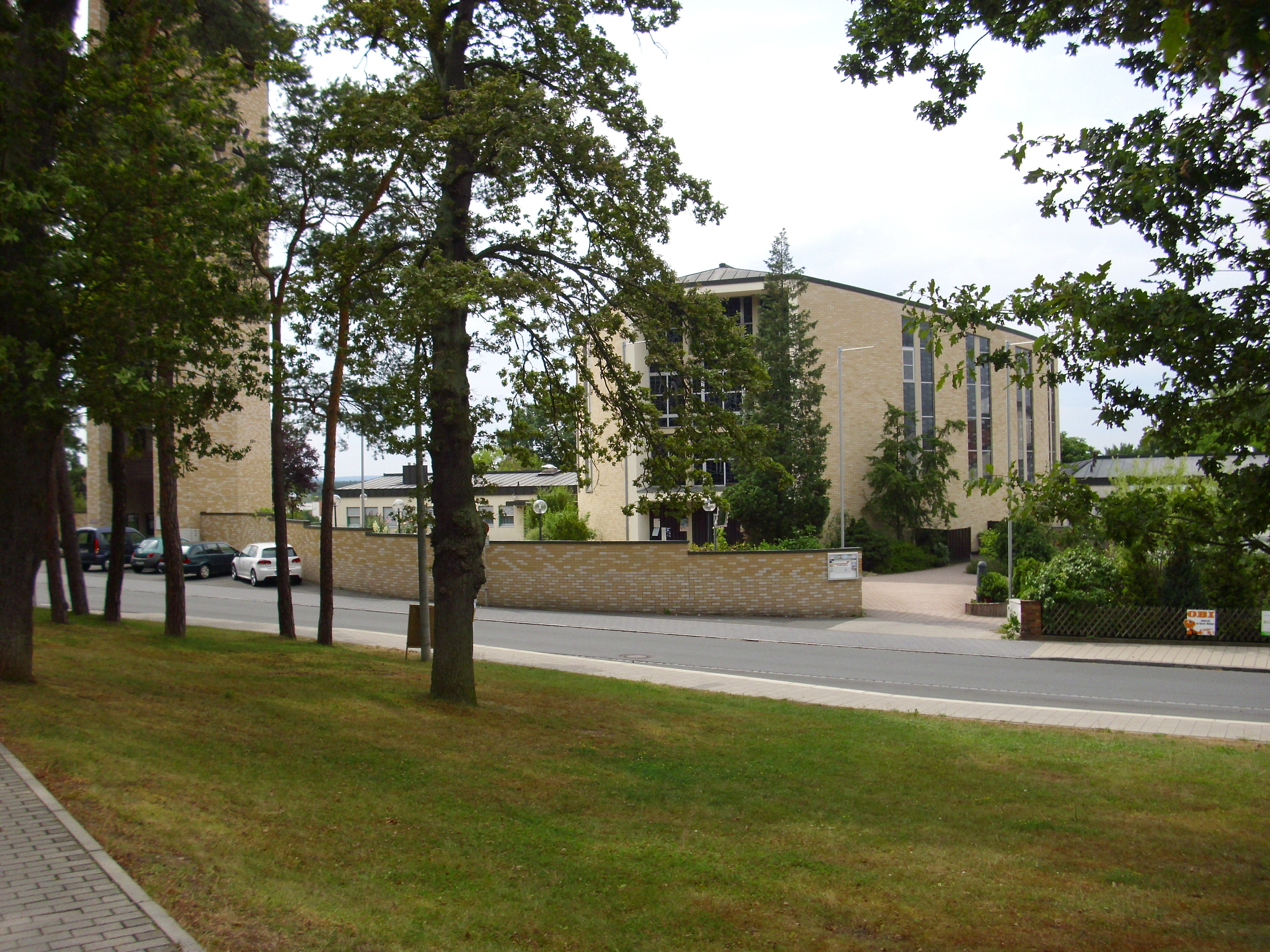
- Church of the Visitation of the Virgin Mary

- Coat of arms

- Location of Bubenreuth within Erlangen-Höchstadt district
- Interactive map of Bubenreuth
- Location within Germany Location within Bavaria
- Coordinates: 49°37′40″N 11°01′02″E
- Country: Germany
- State: Bavaria
- Admin. region: Mittelfranken
- District: Erlangen-Höchstadt

Government
  - Mayor (2020–26): Norbert Stumpf (CSU)

Area
  - Total: 4.13 km^{2} (1.59 sq mi)
- Elevation: 288 m (945 ft)

Population (2025-12-31)
  - Total: 4,578
  - Density: 1,110/km^{2} (2,870/sq mi)
- Time zone: UTC+01:00 (CET)
  - Summer (DST): UTC+02:00 (CEST)
- Postal codes: 91088
- Dialling codes: 09131
- Vehicle registration: ERH
- Website: www.bubenreuth.de

Bubenreuth is a municipality in the district of Erlangen-Höchstadt, in Bavaria, Germany.

== Location ==
Bubenreuth is located near the river Regnitz and ca. 4 kilometers north of Erlangen with which it's structurally connected. Neighboring towns are (from North clockwise) Baiersdorf, Langensendelbach, Marloffstein, Erlangen and Möhrendorf.

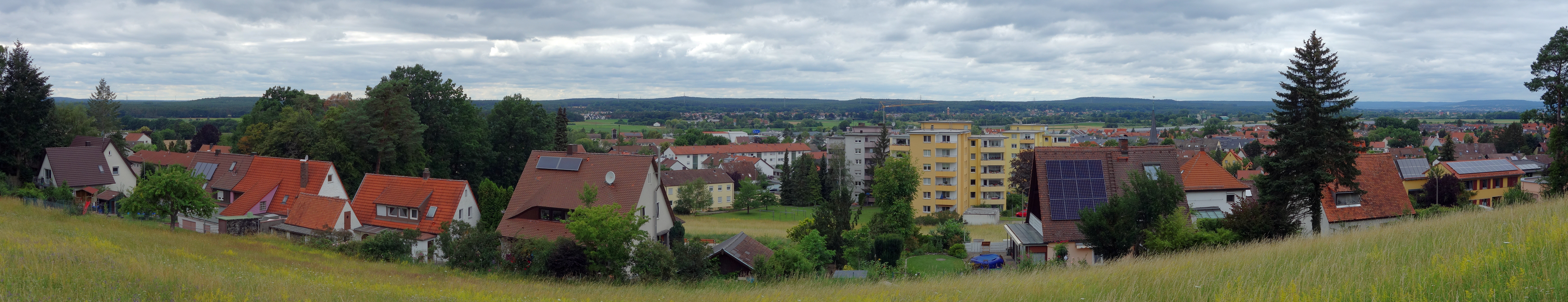
A panorama of Bubenreuth looking north. In the center background, Möhrendorf can be seen.

== History ==
Nothing is known about the founding of Bubenreuth. The suffix -reuth indicates that it was created by a forest clearance. The town is first mentioned as "Bubenrode" in a document dating 24 November 1243.

Bubenreuth gained some prominence after World War II when the town, then having 400 inhabitants, voted to admit 2,000 expelled German refugees from Schönbach im Egerland (now Luby, Czech Republic). Schönbach was then known for its numerous violin makers and instrument builders that now fled to Bubenreuth and opened new workshops there. Among those was of Karl Höfner who opened a new factory in Bubenreuth and died in Bubenreuth in 1955. Höfner manufactured a number of popular guitars and basses in Bubenreuth, such as the Höfner 500/1, a bass guitar used by Paul McCartney since 1961.
