= Möhrendorf =

- Town
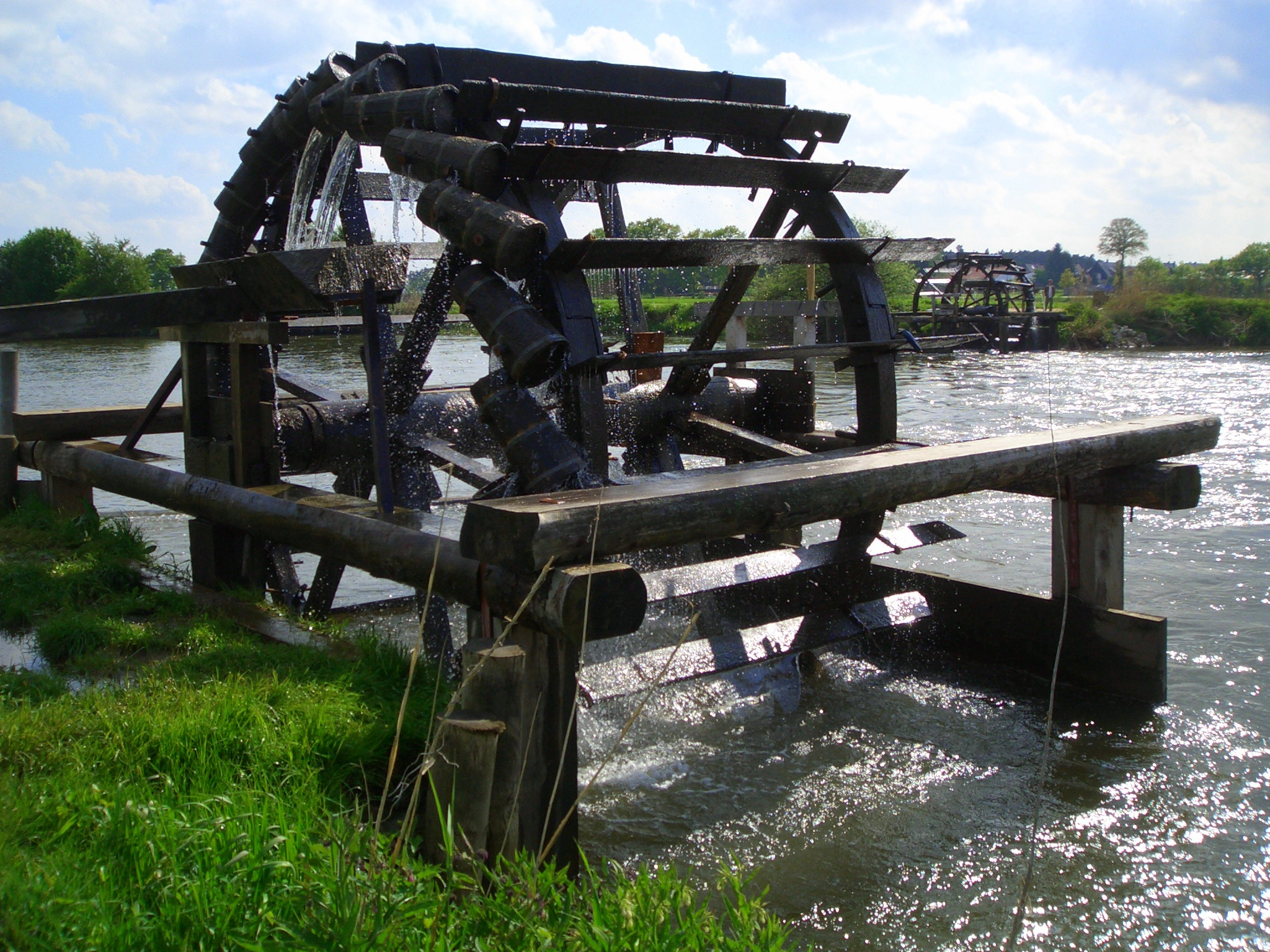
- Historical water wheels on the Regnitz river

- Coat of arms

- Location of Möhrendorf within Erlangen-Höchstadt district
- Interactive map of Möhrendorf
- Location within Germany Location within Bavaria
- Coordinates: 49°38′N 11°00′E
- Country: Germany
- State: Bavaria
- Admin. region: Mittelfranken
- District: Erlangen-Höchstadt
- Subdivisions: 3 districts

Government
  - Mayor (2020–26): Thomas Fischer (CSU)

Area
  - Total: 13.17 km^{2} (5.08 sq mi)
- Elevation: 272 m (892 ft)

Population (2025-12-31)
  - Total: 4,714
  - Density: 357.9/km^{2} (927.0/sq mi)
- Time zone: UTC+01:00 (CET)
  - Summer (DST): UTC+02:00 (CEST)
- Postal codes: 91096
- Dialling codes: 09131, 09133
- Vehicle registration: ERH
- Website: www.moehrendorf.de

Möhrendorf (German pronunciation: [ˈmøːʁənˌdɔʁf]) is a town in the district of Erlangen-Höchstadt, in Bavaria, Germany. It lies on the river Regnitz and the Rhine-Main-Danube Canal.
