= Červený =

Červený (feminine: Červená) is a Czech surname, meaning 'red'. Notable people with the surname include:

- Alex Cerveny (born 1963), Brazilian artist
- Frank S. Cerveny (born 1933), American Episcopalian clergyman
- Jaroslav Červený (1895–1950), Czech footballer
- Rudolf Červený (born 1989), Czech ice hockey player
- Soňa Červená (1925–2023), Czech opera singer, actress and writer
- Václav František Červený (1819–1896), Czech brass instrument maker and inventor
