= Československé hudební nástroje =

Czechoslovak music instrument manufacturing company

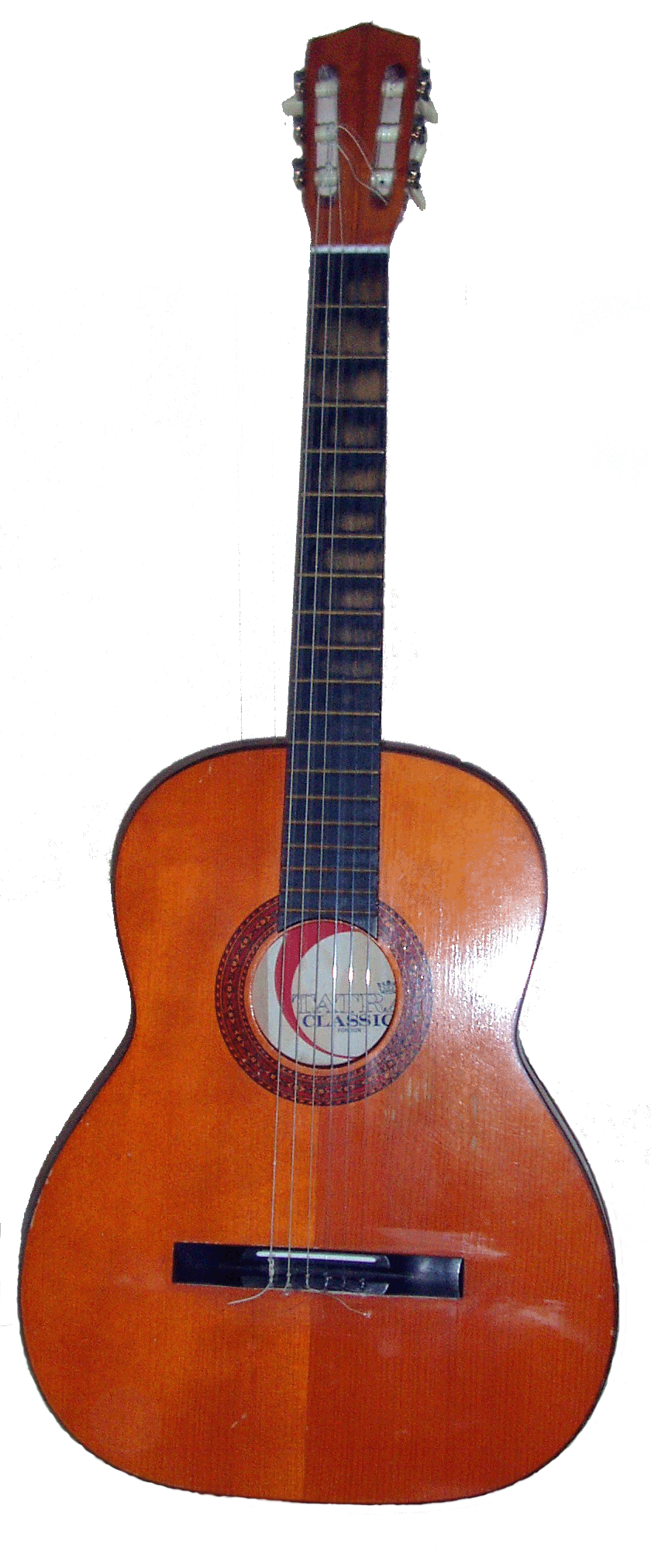
Classical guitar of TATRA, a brand of ČSHN

Československé hudební nástroje, oborový podník (lit. 'Czechoslovak Musical Instruments, specialized business') was — during the era of communist Czechoslovakia from 1948 to 1992 — a state owned music instrument manufacturing company headquartered in Hradec Králové. The company name was later amended — "Československé hudební nástroje, státní podnik" — to reflect ownership by the government. In the 1970s, 50% of its musical instrument export products were supplied to the Soviet Union.

== Brands and nationalized companies ==
The nationalized companies and brands included Petrof, Amati, Červený, Cremona, Rieger-Kloss, Delicia, Jolana, and Tofa.

== Publication ==
Československé hudební nástroje published a journal, Hudební nástroje (Musical Instruments) a "journal for research, development, production and use of musical instruments."

== Notable people ==
- Vladimír Kopta, general manager

== Affiliations ==
Československé hudební nástroje was the founding sponsor of the Prague International Jazz Festival and underwrote it until 1970, when the Ministry of Culture took over.
