= Jolana =

Jolana may refer to:

- Jolana (name)
- Jolana (guitar brand)
