= Tatiana Blass =

Brazilian artist

- Born: November 7, 1979 (age 46); São Paulo, SP
- Education: Universidade Estadual Paulista
- Notable work: Luz que cega - Sentado (2011), Penélope (2011), Metade da Fala no Chão (2008-2010)
- Website: http://www.tatianablass.com.br/

Tatiana Blass (born in São Paulo, SP, 1979) is a Brazilian artist that constructs complex abstract narratives with her performances, paintings, videos, and installations.

Blass began her career creating abstract paintings heavily influenced by collage that highlighted different colors of shapes, soon transitioning into an interdisciplinary practice. Through the manipulation of numerous materials, Tatiana Blass explores the tension between construction and deconstruction, form and function.

Blass has been exhibiting regularly in collective and individual shows throughout Brazil and abroad since 1998.

== Career ==
Tatiana Blass started developing an affinity for art as a child by experimenting with different media, going to exhibitions, and taking art classes, including coursework with Alex Cerveny and Sandra Cinto. In 1998, she was accepted into the Art Institute at Universidade Estadual Paulista (UNESP), earning a bachelor's in art in 2001. During her college years, Blass continued taking independent art courses with famous art critics and artists, including Rodrigo Naves, Alberto Tassinari, Rodrigo Andrade, and Paulo Monteiro.

Both her first collective exhibition and her first solo exhibition were held at UNESP's Art Institute, in 1998 and 2001 respectively. During that period, she exhibited in various art salons in Brazil.

In 2004, Blass presented her first site-specific installation at Ateliê397 in Vila Madalena, São Paulo, creating colorful splotches in the gallery's floor and walls. Her most notorious site-specific installation came seven years later, in 2011, with Penélope, when she took over the chapel and courtyard at Morumbi Chapel, also in São Paulo, where red yarn was weaved through the building's walls and garden, feeding into a loom to create a red carpet.

In Cão Cego, her first solo museum exhibit at the Museum of Modern Art of Bahia in 2009, she started experimenting with the mixture of performance and sculpture, creating wax sculptures that melt and deform over the duration of their exhibition. She would carry the same technique for Luz que cega - Sentado (2001), a work that would ultimately win her the 2011 PIPA Prize. Wax also made an appearance in Metade de fala no chão (2008-2010), part performance and part sculpture, first exhibited at the 29th São Paulo Biennial, where it was poured on musical instruments, rendering them silent.

Tatiana Blass' work is part of the collection of various public and private institutions in Brazil and the USA, including Pinacoteca do Estado de São Paulo, Museu de Arte Moderna do Rio de Janeiro, and Cisneros Fontanals Art Foundation.
