= Shadowland: The Legend =

- Directed by: Johanna Kern
- Written by: Johanna Kern
- Based on: Frank, Big Baba and Forty Thieves
- Produced by: Johanna Kern
- Production companies: After Rain Films; Film Factory Studio
- Release date: September 4, 2012
- Country: Canada
- Language: English

Shadowland: The Legend, also known as Shadowland, The Legend, is a 2012 Canadian independent fantasy family film. The film is based on a stage production Frank, Big Baba and Forty Thieves, written, directed and produced by Johanna Kern, who later adapted the story for the screen, as well as directed and produced it under After Rain Films banner in association with Factory Film Studio.

== Plot ==
Frank (Nathan Pidgeon) and his sister Caroline (Agnes Podbielska) accidentally get transported to mythical Attic Town in a world of mystery, adventure and intrigue: Shadowland. The land is ruled and robbed by The Great Syndicate and, while scary Shadows kidnap anyone who is out after dark, the Patrolling Thieves make the daylight miserable for everyone. Not realizing that they shifted in space and time, the siblings split, while looking for directions. Frank meets Donlore (Andrew Guy), a young Patrolling Thief, and trusts this shadowy figure despite his first instincts. Caroline finds herself on a farm outside of town. She soon sets on a journey to find her brother and help him realize his mistake. She has to find him before dark. When the night falls, he will remain one of the dark rulers forever and there will be no way back. In the meantime, the underground opposition of Attic Town begins to revolt.

== Production ==
Shadowland: The Legend was shot under a working title Frank, Big Baba and Forty Thieves. With its visual effects, and a large cast of hundreds of actors, young performers, professional martial artists and extras, the film has become an unusually big production for an independent film in the fantasy / family genre. The Shadows were played by dozens of high-profile martial artists, including members of the Canadian martial artist team. The film took several years in post-production, due to extensive financial problems and Visual Effects that took 4 and a half years to complete.

== Music ==
Over 80 minutes of the original score for the film was written by Romuald Lipko who has written numerous hit songs for many famous European pop stars and is also the famous leading composer for the Polish music band Budka Suflera, that has been topping the music charts for over 30 years. In creating the music for "Shadowland: The Legend", two other associate composers participated, also members of "Budka Suflera": Piotr Kominek and Lukasz Pilch. One of the musical pieces written by Romuald Lipko became the film’s main theme song, titled also “Shadowland: The Legend”. Johanna Kern wrote the lyrics, and Lukasz Pilch performed and recorded the song. The song quickly hit many English and French language radio stations across Canada, and is also available worldwide on iTunes in the POP MUSIC section.

== Cast ==
The film’s cast members are all Canadian talent, including first-timers as well as seasoned actors. Nathan Pidgeon (Frank) and Agnes Podbielska (Caroline, Frank’s sister) are both first-timers to film. Donlore, a Patrolling Thief who takes young Frank under his wing, is played by seasoned actor Andrew Guy, who has had roles in a number of feature films including The Rhino Brothers, Cooler Climate, Man with a Gun, Kissed and Intersection (with Richard Gere), as well as notable television guest appearances on Sliders, Highlander and others. The film also stars Mark Whelan (Revil), who is the face of the Sleeman™ franchise. Vieslav Krystyan plays the role of Centres, leader of the underground opposition. Krystyan, a seasoned actor, performed in numerous feature films and TV series including Fugitive Pieces, 54, Darkman III, Nikita, The Shrine, Soul Food, Relic Hunter, PSI Factor: Chronicles of the Paranormal, Kung Fu: The Legend Continues among others.

== Distribution ==
"Shadowland: The Legend" was picked up for Canadian distribution by Entertainment One and is represented worldwide by Princ Films and Factory Film Studio (Sales Agencies). The film was first released across Canada on September 4, 2012 as VOD on Rogers, Shaw Cable, Sasktel, MTS, Google Play and iTunes. The USA release date: July 23, 2013 on iTunes, Amazon, Google Play, Hulu, Fandor and Big Start.

== News ==
Johanna Kern and After Rain Films went on to producing and releasing a reality style series, "Shadowland: The Legend - Making Of" – shot behind the scenes on the film’s set and edited for online viewers. Together with the British author Roy Fitzimmonds, Johanna Kern wrote a novel based on her film "Shadowland: The Legend". The novel was published in the U.S.A. by Humans Of Planet Earth Association and received two awards: runner up at the San Francisco Book Festival 2013 and honorable mention at the New York Book Festival 2013. The paperback edition became available worldwide via Amazon and other retailers.
