= Franz Mettal =

Bohemian-Czech luthier (1903 – 1969)

- Born: 5 February 1903; Schönbach, Austria-Hungary
- Died: 19 December 1969 (aged 66); Nürnberg
- Occupation: Luthier
- Father: Ignaz Mettal
- Relatives: Anton Mettal, Rudolf Mettal, Otto Mettal

Franz Mettal (5 February 1903 – 19 December 1969) was a Bohemian German luthier. He is considered to have been one of the most important guitar makers working in Luby, Czechoslovakia.

== Biography ==
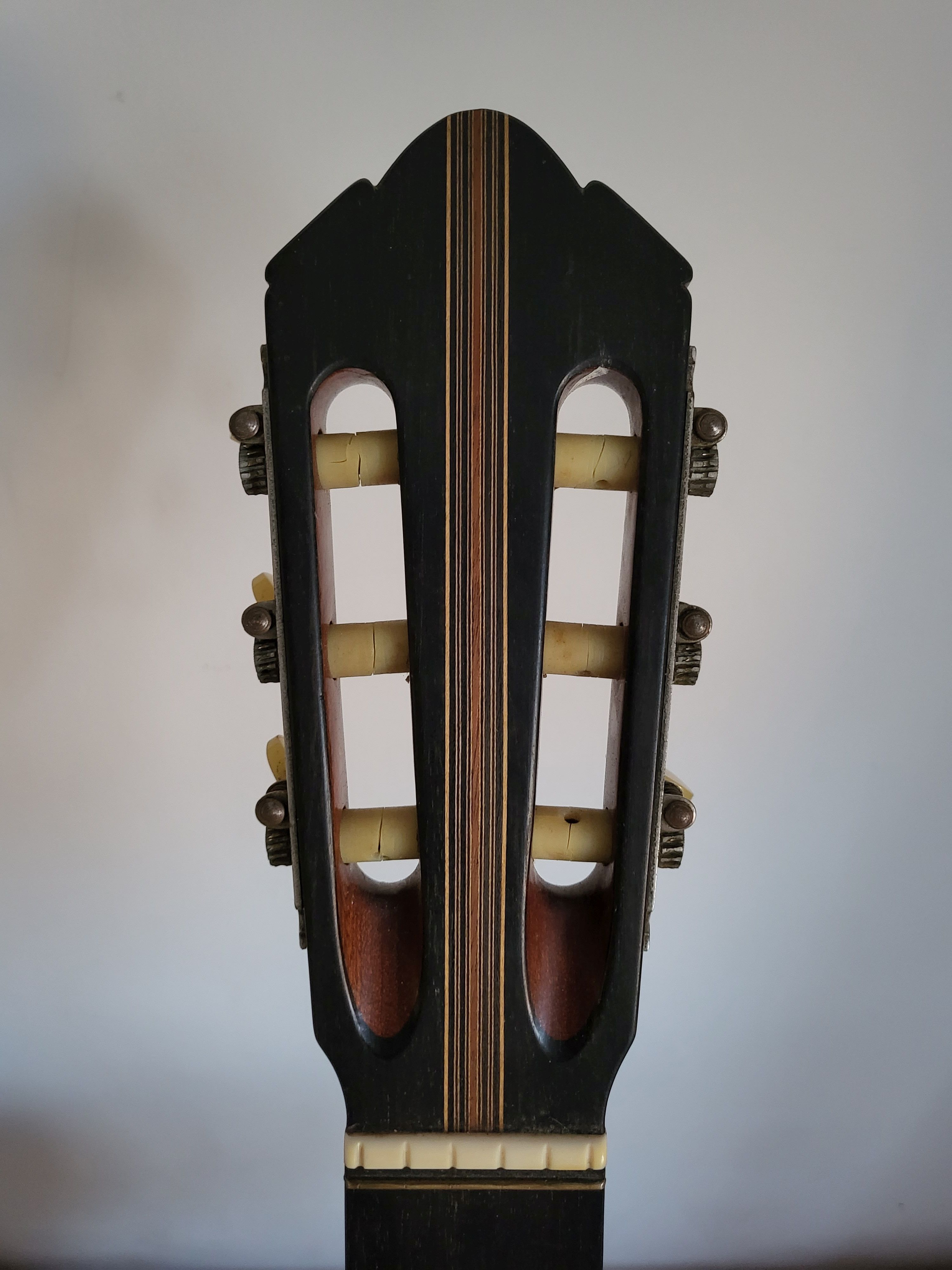
The headstock of a Franz Mettal guitar built in 1956

Mettal was one of the 4 sons of another important luthier based in Luby (until 1946 called Schönbach) Ignaz Mettal and continued in his father's footsteps, building high-quality classical guitars since the 1930s. After the expulsion of Germans from Czechoslovakia, Franz Mettal was allowed to stay in his hometown and continued his work as one of the two luthiers employed by the Czechoslovak state-owned Cremona national company who were granted the status of a master builder. This allowed him access to best materials available in Czechoslovakia at that time and his instruments were intended for professional players and were unavailable on the regular market.

== Style of work ==
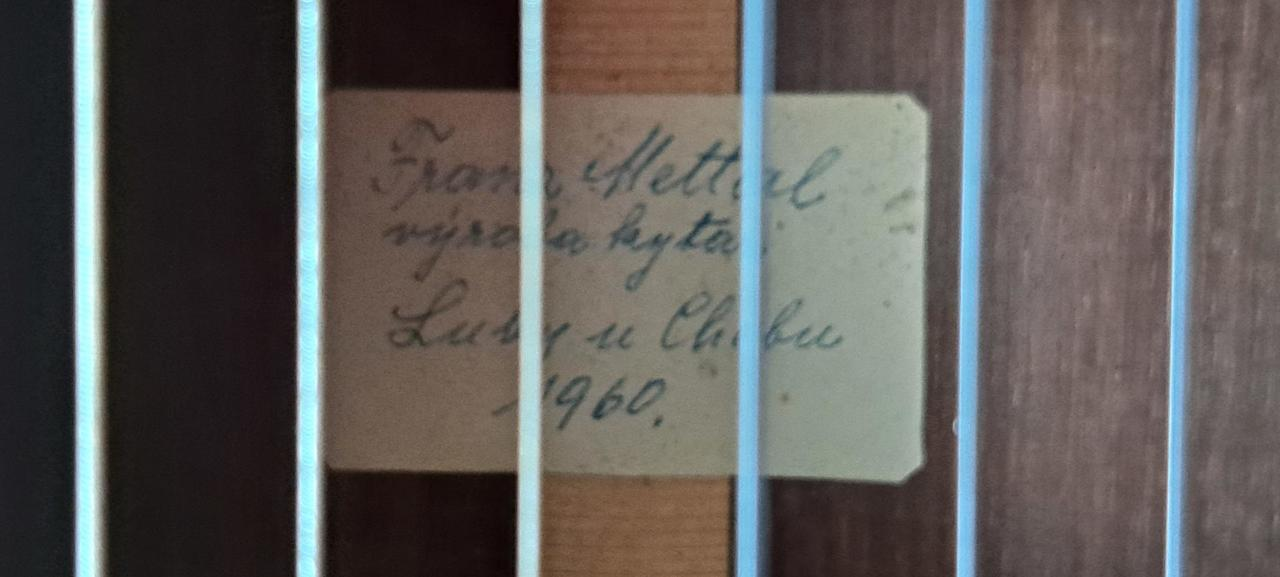
An example of Franz Mettal's label from the 1960s written in Czech

Franz Mettal typically built classical guitars in the general style of Torres's builds featuring a 650 mm scale length and a fan-braced solid spruce top. His documented post-war instruments feature a distinct headstock shape ("mountain peak") with an inlaid (or rather interlaid) headstock plate, a zero fret, spanish heel, necks glued from several pieces and a bound back extension covering the bottom part of the neck heel. The material used on the backs and sides includes walnut and flame maple.

Some of his instruments made in the 1950s were not signed visibly (not unusual in guitars produced by local luthiers even before World War II), with the signature (Franz Mettal, Schönbach and the date of production) eventually located on the inside of the top and thereby hidden to plain sight. Some of his guitars made since the end of the 1950s featured a plain hand-written label in Czech, which included the contemporary name of the town (Luby) instead of the former name (Schönbach).
