= Paulo Monteiro =

Paulo Monteiro may refer to:

- Paulo Monteiro (footballer, born 1985), Portuguese footballer who plays for AD Fafe as a central defender
- Paulo Monteiro (artist) (born 1961), Brazilian artist
