= Strunal CZ, a.s. =

Musical instrument manufacturer

Strunal Schönbach Ltd.
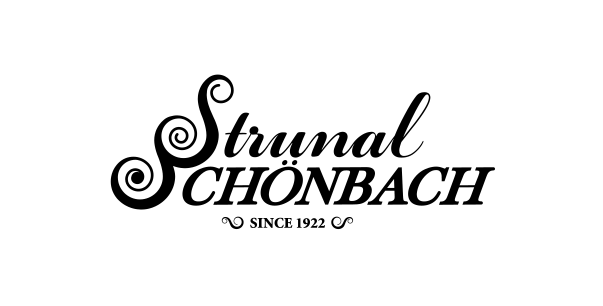
- Logo created March 2016
- Company type: Limited company
- Industry: Musical instruments String instruments Violins Double basses Guitars
- Founded: 1922; 104 years ago
- Headquarters: Petra Bezruče 730, 351 37, Luby, Czech Republic
- Area served: Worldwide
- Key people: Lukas Mikeska
- Products: Violins, violas, violoncellos, double basses, bows, classical guitars
- Production output: String instruments, repair & service
- Number of employees: 80
- Website: strunalschonbach.com

Strunal Schönbach s.r.o. is a string instrument manufacturer based in Luby, Czech Republic. Strunal, in its current corporate structure that was established in 1992, is an outgrowth (or successor) of Cremona, a joint-stock company founded in Schönbach in Czechoslovakia in 1922. In 1946, after World War II, the Cremona cooperative was founded in Luby (as it was renamed after World War II).

== History ==
After World War II, instrument making in Czechoslovakia slowly began to recover. In 1945, the Amati cooperative was founded by persuading instrument makers from Kraslice, Luby and Plesná to join.

=== 1946: Cremona cooperative ===
At the same time, about 40 instrument makers from Luby (formerly called Schönbach) decided to join forces and, in 1946, founded Cremona to manage the production in the village focused in strings instruments.

Two years later the communist party decided to start a nationalization and the process was completed in 1950. The Cremona cooperative ceased to be private merely four years after its birth. That year Cremona and all the musical instruments making companies (like the Amati cooperative) were taken over and turned into national enterprises. The format or models of those enterprises comprised a main plant and warehouse divided in many small workshops (booths) concentrated inside the plants and some small satellite workshops nearby in the villages surrounding the plants. There was an effort trying to gather all the makers close and concentrated in these big kernels. Makers all around the country were progressively joining one of the enterprises and moving to those towns and cities.

=== 1958: Incorporation of Cremona by Amati ===
Cremona grew in the following years and managed to reopen the export routes. By the late '50s they were exporting two thirds of the production. Along with budget lines they always made high quality hand made violins and guitars earning back some of the old reputation. But they were flying a bit in their own way and the major changes happening in 1958 had a deep repercussion in Cremona. That year the heads in charge of the musical industry decided that Cremona had to get closer to the established model of a single big plant with the workers close together. Apparently there was some booths in the not too big Cremona building and so many shops spreading all over the Luby area too. The heads wanted more production and more industrialized. So Cremona was incorporated by Amati as an attempt of widening the market. Things improved. There were more sales, new buildings and services were projected and Cremona grew even more. But the next decade, the '60s, turned out to be very different than expected.

First there was a big fire in 1962 partly destroying the main building, so many builders (mainly violin makers) had to be relocated spreading all over Luby — in rooms, shops, and the like — to keep the production running. The Cremona builders were far from concentrated in a single point, in fact, less concentrated than ever before. The veteran old masters and workers were old and progressively retiring from the activity, the Luby population was halved all of a sudden, there were not few Schönbachers killed during the war, the youngsters were not specially interested in their family jobs and there were very few apprentices joining Cremona, so the Cremona staff was continuously decreasing all along the decade, the production decreased as did the quality.

=== Other manufacturers ===
Parallel to Cremona, a plant in Blatná, the Dřevokov cooperative, was experimenting with electric stringed instruments led by Josef Ruzicka. They introduced the first Resonet guitars in 1954. The solid body Grazioso was a true sales success. In 1958 Ruzicka and his team moved to a new big plant in Hradec Králové. The brand new Jolana and Neoton designs and brands were launched the next year. Again a great success.

In 1963, the whole guitar range was revised and fully redesigned and a new plant was opened in Krnov. These new Jolana guitars with their modern up-to-date design and good construction were an instant success all over the eastern bloc and easily made their way into the occidental market too.

In the meanwhile, the good but old fashioned Cremona designs were threatened by the modern '58 Ruzicka designs and fully swept away by the following '63 designs success. All this along with the many internal problems and progressive decay in Cremona, made the former guitar making flagship enterprise to be downgraded to a secondary role by the leading stuff made in Hradec Kralove. In Cremona the guitar production faded in favor of violins and guitars were never too relevant in their production ever again. The higher end archtops just disappeared (apparently dropped in 1967) and mainly only classical guitars and less expensive archtops were built.

As a possible indicator of the economic sentiment, Bräuer moved to Bubenreuth to reunite with the expelled Schönbacher craftsmen in the spring of 1968. He was leading the guitar construction in Cremona and was the main reputed master maker in Luby. Ethnically, he was Czech. Instrument making at the Cremona plant in Luby seemed to be in decline. The guitar production was reduced and endangered. Bräuer had been defeated by his Hradec Kralove partners-turned-competitors. In Bubenreuth, Bräuer opened a shop and started to make classical guitars for different brands.

=== 1965: Further national consolidation ===
In 1965, the Czechoslovak Musical Instruments, special business enterprise (ČSHN — Československé hudební nástroje, oborový podník) was created, with the aim of managing the instrument production for all of Czechoslovakia. The former companies were subsidiary enterprises of the new mother company having brand new headquarters and a plant in Hradec Králové.

=== 1992: Privatization of Cremona ===
In 1992, the financial health of Cremona had deteriorated from the culmination of several factors, including the departure of talented craftsmen out on their own. Cremona, while a state owned enterprise, filed for protection from bankruptcy which resulted in a restructuring and privatization on September 1, 1992, by two partners:

1. Creation of Strunal, composed of key Cremona management
2. Musicexportu

Under waning sales in North America, Sturnal, in 1997, broke ties with its longstanding sole customer, Geneva International Corporation in Wheeling, Illinois, formed its own subsidiary, Strunal America, Inc. The subsidiary is based in Mountainside, New Jersey, and is the parent's sole supplier to North America.

In 2005, Strunal was re-structured as a public limited liability, and named Strunal CZ, a.s., Strunal, in its corporate literature, purports to be the largest manufacturer of stringed musical instruments in Europe. The name Strunal is derived from the Czech spelling of "String" ("Struna") and "Luby."

=== 2016: Change of ownership ===
During March 2016 the company went from being a joint stock company to a private limited company and changed name to its current name, Strunal Schönbach. Thus acknowledging the history not only of the company but of the region.

Since privatization in the 90's, Strunal has exported under the label of Josef Jan Dvorak (for bowed instruments) and Strunal or Amada (for guitars).
