= V. F. Červený & Synové =

Czech brass instrument manufacturer

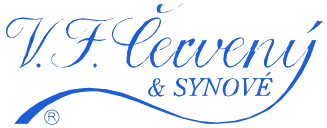
V. F. Červený & Synové logo

V. F. Červený & Synové is a Czech brand of brass instruments, established in 1842 by Václav František Červený and manufactured by Amati Kraslice.

== History ==
Červený established his workshop with four employees in Königgrätz, now Hradec Králové, in 1842. After establishing an additional factory in Kyiv in 1867 it grew to over 100 workers by 1880. By then a family business known since 1876 as V. F. Červený & Synové (V. F. Červený & Sons), it was a prolific operation supplying thousands of instruments annually to the Imperial Russian Army, as well as the royal household after receiving the k.u.k. Hoflieferant (Imperial and Royal Warrant of Appointment) distinction in 1884.

The company was nationalised in 1946, and in 1948 it, along with several other Czech manufacturers, became Amati Kraslice, part of the Československé hudební nástroje, the national instrument manufacturing cooperative. It was subsequently re-privatised in 1993 after the dissolution of Czechoslovakia.

In 2016, British manufacturer Geneva Instruments purchased both the Červený and Amati-Denak businesses and continued to operate them as subsidiaries based in the Czech Republic. In 2020 however, the Červený factory in Hradec Králové was closed down due to the insolvency of its sister company, Amati-Denak.

== Manufacturing ==
Manufacturing resumed in October 2021 at the Amati factory in Kraslice. Since the early 20th century Červený has produced brass instruments for military and brass bands, such as cornets, flugelhorns, tenor horns, and baritone horns. In addition to standard orchestral brass instruments (trumpets, french horns, trombones and especially tubas) it manufactures less common instruments such as piccolo and bass trumpets, Wagner tubas and cimbassos, as well as rotary valve trombones for Italian opera and East European orchestras. It also manufactures lines of mouthpieces for its instruments.
