= Johanna Kern =

Polish-Canadian film producer, screenwriter and director

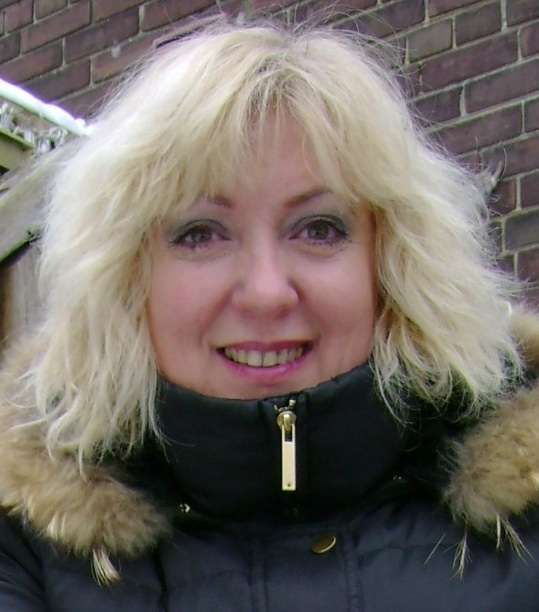
- Kern in 2013
- Occupations: Film producer, screenwriter, director, author, entrepreneur, researcher
- Years active: Since 1995
- Spouse: Patrick Kern-Wronikowski

Johanna Kern is a Polish–Canadian film producer, screenwriter, director, author, entrepreneur, and researcher. She wrote, directed, and produced the fantasy feature film Shadowland: The Legend.

Kern has published articles in film and media journals, including *Kinema*, on topics such as film economics. She also authored work on theoretical models involving frequency-based frameworks, presenting her synthesis in *The Theory of All: The Physics and Mathematics of Frequencies* (2025).

== Early life, education and beginning of artistic career ==
Johanna Kern was born in Poland, where she studied Fine Arts at the Visual Arts College, Kielce. She then studied drama as an actor/apprentice in theatre, also in Kielce. She became a professional actress, and after moving to Toronto, Canada, continued acting on stage and screen. The first screen credit she earned in Canadian film was for a principal role of Mrs. Yarulewski in "Sam & Me" (as Johanna Kern-Wronikowski), a feature by Deepa Mehta. At the same time, Kern also ran "SMYK" theatre company in Toronto, focusing its repertoire on young audiences, and worked as a radio Host/Producer at "Breakfast Radio Zet", a show targeting Polish-Canadian audiences in the Toronto area. Later, she continued her education at Ryerson Polytechnic University, and graduated with an honors B.A. degree in Applied Arts/Film Studies. Kern was also the founder of "Kid Stage", an acting school for children, teenagers and young adults, operating in Mississauga, Ontario. She taught acting to over 100 children each semester, and produced stage musicals with a large cast of over 200 child actors and dancers, including "Kid Stage" students.

In 2002, Kern decided to use one of her stage plays, "Frank, Big Baba and Forty Thieves" as the basis for her fantasy / family feature film. While "Frank, Big Baba and Forty Thieves" was a stage musical, filled with dancers playing "Robbers", the film version of the story (later titled "Shadowland: The Legend") was structured around fantasy creatures called "Shadows", played by dozens of highly skilled martial artists.

== Career ==
Johanna Kern is a filmmaker involved in producing, writing and directing. Early in her career, she was a professional actress in Europe, and in 1989 moved to Toronto, Canada, to pursue her career in film and television. Kern has made a number of dramatic short films including the critically acclaimed short "Cherries for Brian" (1997 Palm Springs International Film Festival, Raindance International Film Festival and Figueira da Foz International Film Festival- Portugal). Her other short films include "All About Men" (1996 Raindance International Film Festival and Cinewomen – Norwich International Film Festival), "All About Women" (1996), "Toronto: Second Society" (1995 – documentary about homeless) and "The Portrait of a Man" (1994)

Aside from the short films she made in the 1990s, she also produced, wrote and directed "Shadowland: The Legend", a fantasy / family feature film. The film was picked up for Canadian distribution by Entertainment One and was first released across Canada on 4 September 2012, as VOD on several TV cable outlets, as well as on Telus, iTunes and Google Play.

Kern has also written several feature screenplays and worked as a producer/director on a number of television commercials and music videos. She was the founder and executive director of "Fantasy Worldwide Film Festival" (2005–2007). The festival had a widespread media coverage from many popular television, radio and newspaper outlets, and focused on projects in the genres of World Mythology, Mysticism, Magical Realism, Fantasy, Sci-Fi, Legend & Archetype.

Johanna Kern holds an Honors Bachelor of Applied Arts/Film from Ryerson Polytechnic University, Toronto, Canada, and previously studied drama and fine arts in Europe.

== Other professional work ==
In January 2013, Johanna Kern and her husband Patrick Kern established the non-profit organization Humans of Planet Earth Assn. (H.O.P.E. Assn.) to support people through workshops, seminars, events, conferences, classes, art, video and film projects, festivals, exhibitions, fairs, and shows.

In January 2016, Johanna Kern started her weekly radio show "The Life You Want Is Yours – with Johanna Kern" on British Islanders Radio, dedicated to helping people make progress in their lives.

== Other writings and book awards ==
ARTICLES IN INTERNATIONAL MAGAZINES: In 1999–2000 Johanna Kern wrote for Kinema: a journal for film and audiovisual media.

Since the beginning of 2019, Johanna Kern has cooperated with several American, Australian, and European magazines (printed and online), regularly writing articles on personal development, life improvement, and spirituality.

SONGS: Johanna Kern co-wrote the song "Shadowland: The Legend" with European composer Romuald Lipko (Budka Suflera).

BOOKS: In 2013, Johanna Kern's autobiographical book, focused on spiritual and personal growth, titled Master and The Green-Eyed Hope, was published by Humans of Planet Earth Assn. (ISBN 1-9793-0760-1). Her next book, 365 (+1) Affirmations to Create a Great Life, was published shortly after (ISBN 1-9815-1511-9), followed by Shadowland: The Legend (co-written with Roy Fitzsimmonds) – a novel for young adults based on her feature film. Her next book, Master Teachings of HOPE, was published in 2017 (ISBN 1-9812-8414-1), followed by Secrets of Love for Everyone in 2018 (ISBN 1-9756-7703-X), and The Birth of a Soul in 2021 (ISBN 978-1-989913-07-9).

=== The Theory of All: The Physics and Mathematics of Frequencies ===
The Theory of All: The Physics and Mathematics of Frequencies is a 2025 non-fiction work proposing a unified framework based on frequency interaction. The book examines relationships between matter, energy, and awareness through vibrational patterns, presenting mathematical structures intended to describe formation and transformation in physical and non-physical systems.

The work outlines three primary frequency domains—Matter, the Emboss Field, and the Protoboss Field—and introduces a system of “Seven Powers,” described as fundamental energetic codes within a vibrational architecture. The book includes a foreword by psychologist and researcher Stanley Krippner, Ph.D., who notes the framework’s potential relevance for empirical investigation.

== Book awards ==
The Birth of a Soul – runner-up at the 2021 San Francisco Book Festival (Spiritual/Inspirational category).

The Birth of a Soul – Honorable Mention at the 2021 New York Book Festival (Spiritual/Inspirational category).

Secrets of Love for Everyone – Honorable Mention at the 2018 Los Angeles Book Festival (How-To category).

365 (+1) Affirmations to Create a Great Life – Honorable Mention at the 2018 Los Angeles Book Festival (General Non-Fiction category).

Master and The Green-Eyed Hope – Honorable Mention at the 2013 San Francisco Book Festival (Spiritual/Inspirational category).

Shadowland: The Legend – runner-up at the 2013 San Francisco Book Festival (Young Adults category).

Master and The Green-Eyed Hope – Honorable Mention at the 2013 New York Book Festival (Spiritual/Inspirational category).

Shadowland: The Legend – Honorable Mention at the 2013 New York Book Festival (Young Adults category).

== Filmography ==
- 2012 "Shadowland: The Legend" (feature)
- 1997 "Cherries for Brian" (short)
- 1997 "All About Men" (short)
- 1996 "All About Women" (short)
- 1995 "Toronto: Second Society" (documentary about homeless)
- 1994 "Portrait of a Man" (short)
- 1991 "Kot w Butach" (TV movie)
