= Hudební nástroje =

Hudební nástroje (lit. 'Musical Instruments') was a Czechoslovak quarterly journal for research, development, production, and use of musical instruments. It was published by the state-owned instrument manufacturer, Československé hudební nástroje, headquartered in Hradec Králové. It was first published in 1964 (Volume 1, Issue 1). Its final issue was in 1999 (Volume 36, Issue 2). Variant names were HMM: Hudební nástroje (beginning 1991) and Musikinstrumente.

== Publishers ==
1990–1992: VANN, s.r.o., Hradec Králové (the firm dissolved in 1992)

VANN is an acronym for Vydavatelství a nakladatelství novinářů (publishing journalists)
