= Jolana (name) =

Jolán is a Hungarian female given name, derived from the Hungarian words of Jó and leán (jó leány in modern Hungarian), meaning good girl. In Czechia, it is interpreted also as an East-Slavic version of the Greek name Helen (Helena). Pronounced yaw-lah-nah.

== Name days ==
- Hungarian: 15 January, 18 and 20 November
- Czech: 15 September
- Slovak: 15 September

== People with given name Jolana ==
- Jolana Fogašová, Slovak opera singer
- Jolana Neméthová (born 1954), Czechoslovak handball player

== See also ==
- Jolana (guitar brand) – maker of Czech guitars
