= Václav František Červený =

19th-century Czech brass instrument maker

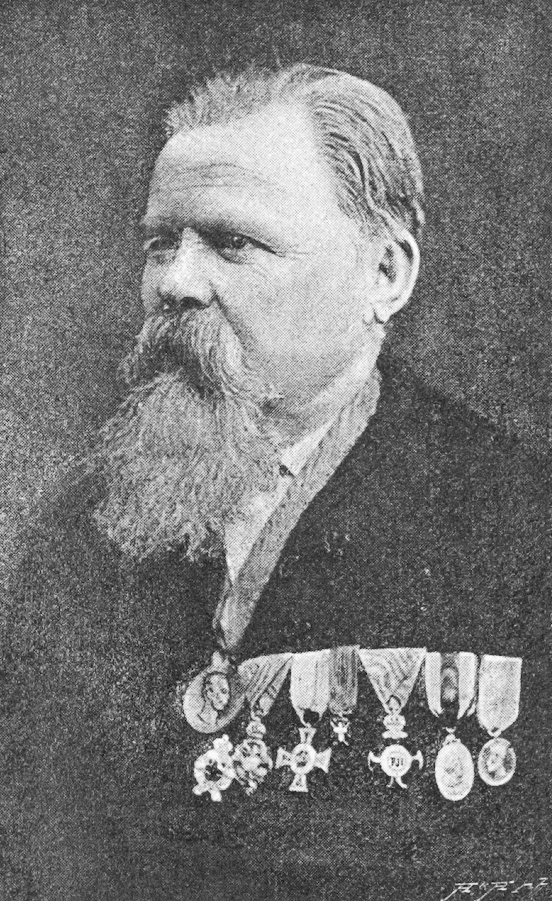
- Červený in 1892
- Born: 27 September 1819; Dubeč, Austrian Empire
- Died: 19 January 1896 (aged 76); Hradec Králové, Austria-Hungary
- Occupations: Inventor, musical instrument manufacturer
- Known for: Inventor of brass instruments
- Relatives: Jiří Červený (grandson); Soňa Červená (great-granddaughter)

Václav František Červený (27 September 1819 – 19 January 1896) was a Czech brass instrument maker and inventor. He became the principal manufacturer of such instruments in Austria-Hungary.

== Inventions ==
Červený was a prolific inventor, rivalling his Belgian contemporary Adolphe Sax in output and recognition. Many of his inventions were widely copied despite his patents, especially in France. One of his significant inventions was a process for drawing a conical-bore tube from solid brass, which he used to create several instruments with widely flaring conical bores. The Cornon, patented in 1844 as a substitute for the french horn in military bands, inspired the later Wagner tuba. Other instrument patents include the Serpentbombardon (a valved bass ophicleide), Armee-Posaune (a family of upright marching valve trombones in four sizes from alto to contrabass), and the circular-wrapped Kornett-Instrumente for performing salon music, notably taken up by Tsar Alexander III of Russia, who was an amateur musician. He is attributed with building the first contrabass tuba in 18′ B♭, and patented the Kaiserbass in 1884.

Many of Červený's conical bore instruments influenced the development of later instruments such as the tuba, euphonium, and modern marching band instruments.

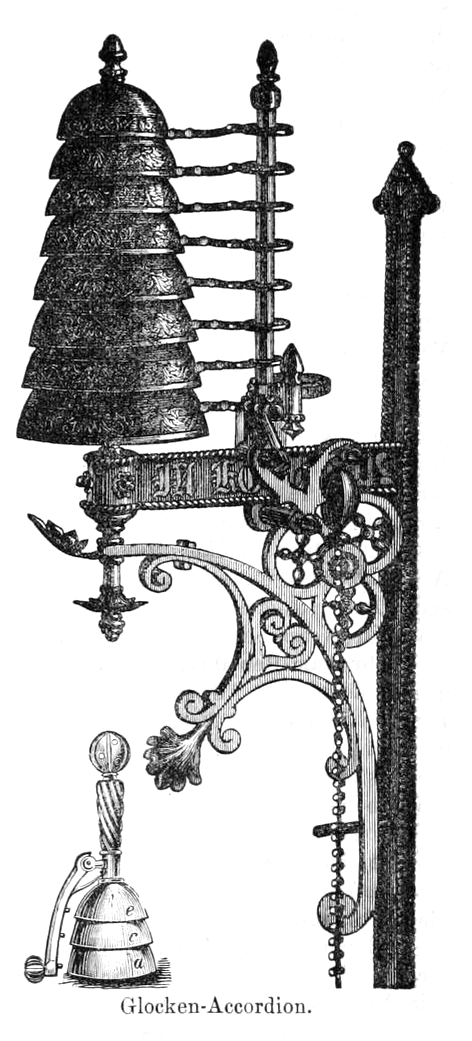
Glocken-Accordion

Červený also patented percussion instrument inventions, including the Votiv-timpani and the Glocken-Akkordion (a form of altar bell).

After his death, his firm introduced in 1908 a line of highly compact Tornister (lit. 'knapsack') instruments, in particular tubas pitched in 12′ F and 18′ B♭ wrapped about the size of a modern tenor horn, and revived in the 21st century by Wessex as "travel tubas".

== The Červený company ==
Červený established his workshop with four employees in Königgrätz in 1842. After establishing an additional factory in Kyiv in 1867 it grew to over 100 workers by 1880. By then a family business known since 1876 as V. F. Červený & synové (V. F. Červený & Sons), it was a prolific operation supplying thousands of instruments annually to the Imperial Russian Army, as well as the royal household after receiving the k.u.k. Hoflieferant (Imperial and Royal Warrant of Appointment) distinction in 1884. After Červený's death, the company became part of the nationalized instrument manufacturing cooperative Amati in 1948. It was subsequently re-privatised in 1993 using its Červený name after the dissolution of Czechoslovakia.

== Honours ==
Červený's reputation as the leading brass maker in Austria-Hungary was widely acknowledged during his lifetime, receiving medals at universal exhibitions in Paris (in 1855, 1867, and the gold medal in 1889) and Chicago, and honours from several European heads of state.
