= Budka Suflera =

Polish rock band

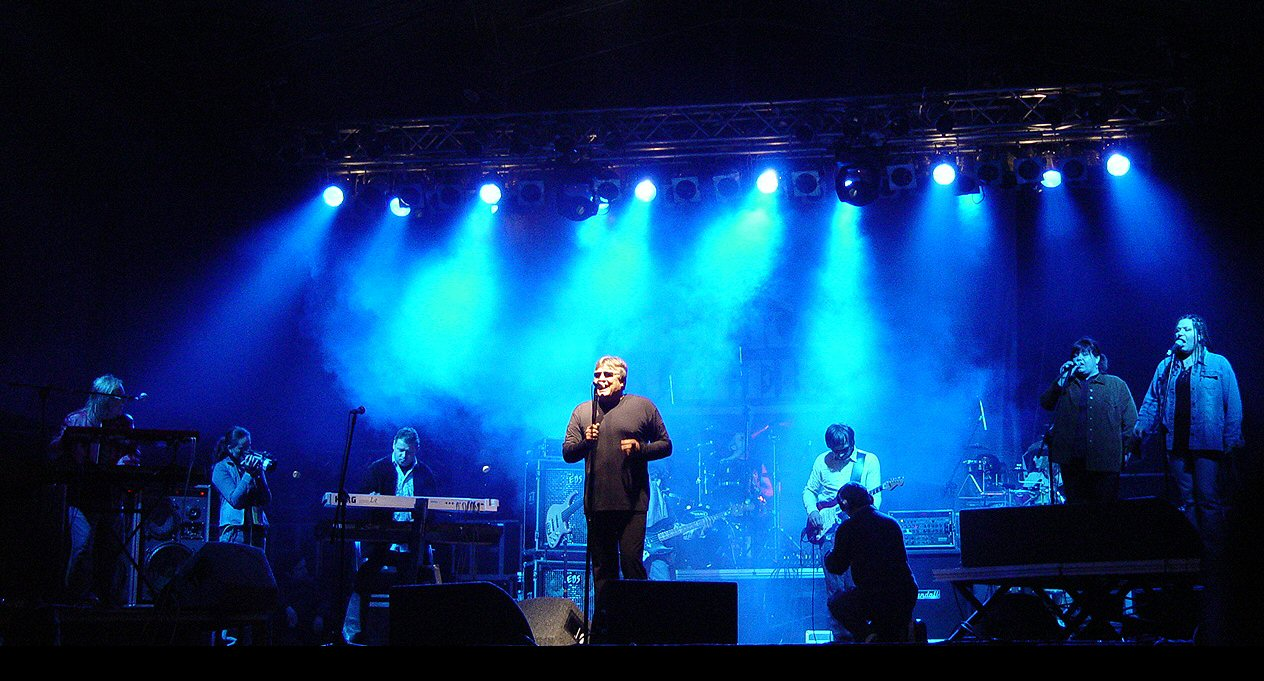
- Budka Suflera performing in Gdańsk (2005)

Background information
- Origin: Lublin, Poland
- Genres: Rock, Progressive rock
- Years active: 1969–1970; 1974–2014; 2019–present
- Labels: New Abra, EMI, MTJ, Sony Music
- Members: Jacek Kawalec; Robert Żarczyński; Tomasz Zeliszewski; Dariusz Bafeltowski; Piotr Bogutyn; Mieczysław Jurecki; Irena Michalska; Piotr Sztajdel
- Website: www.budkasuflera.pl

Budka Suflera (Polish pronunciation: ['butka su'flɛra], "prompter's box") is a Polish rock band which was started in 1969 in Lublin by Krzysztof Cugowski. Although they disbanded soon after, Cugowski and Romuald Lipko reformed the band in 1974 and were active until 2014. The next reunion occurred in 2019.

Budka Suflera – a Polish rock band founded in Lublin in 1974 by: Romuald Lipko (Association of All Virtues), Krzysztof Cugowski, Andrzej Ziółkowski (Association of All Virtues).

== History ==
=== Early days (1969–1974) ===
The band was started in 1969 with jam sessions by Krzysztof Cugowski (vocals), Krzysztof Brozi (lead guitar), Janusz Pędzisz (bass guitar) and Jacek Grün (drums). They performed cover versions of John Mayall, Jimi Hendrix and Led Zeppelin in local venues and disbanded after making a few radio recordings and several concerts.

In 1970 Cugowski joined a band Stowarzyszenie Cnót Wszelakich, led by his school mate Romuald Lipko. Soon the band was renamed to Budka Suflera. After few member changes the band finally made in March 1974 to be their first major recording, "Sen o dolinie" as the Polish cover of Bill Withers' "Ain't No Sunshine". The song received much airplay, which resulted in an offer from Polskie Nagrania record label, as well as numerous concert proposals.

=== Breakthrough (1975–1976) ===
In autumn 1974, they recorded "Cień wielkiej góry", inspired by death of Polish mountaineers Zbigniew Stepek and Andrzej Grzązek in the Himalayas in 1973. It instantly became a hit and appeared on many compilations and live albums since then. The band also recorded "Lubię ten stary obraz" in November 1974 and "Memu miastu na do widzenia" in the beginning of 1975. The drummer Zbigniew Zieliński was replaced by Tomasz Zeliszewski soon after this.

The first album, titled Cień wielkiej góry after its first track, was released in 1975. This record saw some contributions from Czesław Niemen, who played his Moog synthesizer psychedelic parts in a majestic rock suite called "Szalony koń". Clocking over 19 minutes, this track took a whole B-side of the long play.

The radio hit "Sen o dolinie" as well as "Memu miastu na do widzenia" were not placed on the album. The first one was rejected by the record label, because it was a cover of a foreign artist and the latter was written by Lipko solely (there was a sort of deal among the band members, they wanted only songs written by Cugowski and Lipko together on the first album). However, the latter would make an appearance in a re-recorded version on the 1981 album Za ostatni grosz.

The release became a success and the band went on a tour to East Germany. There, German versions of a few of the band's greatest hits were recorded. There were plans to release an album in Germany, but they failed as Cugowski missed a recording session. A second attempt failed, too, because of the exhausting tour that ended just before.

In 1976 another band's record, named Przechodniem byłem między wami was released. It did not repeat the success of its predecessor. After the release, Cugowski decided to leave the band and start a solo career. He was replaced by Stanisław Wenglorz, an ex-singer of Skaldowie. He has only appeared on few records ("Rozmowa", "Kula nocnego światła", "Ślady na piasku", "Życiowy numer"), then unreleased and quit soon after. The next vocalist became Romuald Czystaw.

== Current members ==
- Robert Żarczyński - vocals (2019-present)
- Jacek Kawalec - vocals (2022-present)
- Irena Michalska - vocals (2021-present)
- Dariusz Bafeltowski - guitar (2019-present)
- Piotr Bogutyn - guitar (2019-present)
- Mieczysław "Mechanik" Jurecki - bass guitar (1982-1983, 1986-1987, 1992-2003, to 2019-present)
- Tomasz Zeliszewski - drums (1975-present)
- Piotr Sztajdel - keyboards (2020-present)

== Former members ==
- Krzysztof Cugowski - vocal (1969-1974, 1974-1978, 1983-2014)
- Stanisław Wenglorz - vocal (1978)
- Romuald Czystaw - vocal (1978-1982, died in 2010)
- Krzysztof Brozi - guitar (1969-1970, died in 1996)
- Felicjan Andrzejczak - vocal (1982-1983, died in 2024)
- Andrzej Ziółkowski / Boguslaw Andrew Ziolkowski (USA) - guitar Jolana (1969-1971), guitar Mayones Guitars & Basses (1971/1972/1973-1974), guitar Mayones Guitars & Basses (1974-1978), bass guitar Rickenbacker_Rickenbacker 4001 (1978-1981, died in 2001}
- Jan Borysewicz - guitar (1978-1982)
- Zdzisław Janiak - guitar (1979-1983)
- Andrzej Sidło - guitar (1982-1984)
- Krzysztof Mandziara - guitar (1983-1988)
- Stanisław Zybowski - guitar (1987-1988, died in 2001)
- Arkadiusz Smyk - guitar (1988-1992)
- Marek Raduli - guitar (1992-2003)
- Łukasz Pilch - guitar (2003-2014)
- Janusz Pędzisz - bass guitar (1969-1970)
- Romuald Lipko - bass guitar (1969-1974, 1974-1978), keyboards (1978-2020, died in 2020)
- Piotr Płecha - bass guitar (1983-1986)
- Mirosław Stępień - bass guitar (2003-2014)
- Jacek Grün - drums (1969-1970, died in 2020)
- Witold Odorowicz - keyboards (1969-1970)
- Piotr Kominek - keyboards (2003-2014)
- Anna Patynek - percussion instruments (2003-2008)

== Discography ==
=== Studio albums ===
- Cień wielkiej góry (1975)
- Przechodniem byłem między wami (1976)
- Na brzegu światła (1979)
- Ona przyszła prosto z chmur (1980)
- Za ostatni grosz (1982)
- Czas czekania, czas olśnienia (1984)
- Giganci tańczą (1986)
- Ratujmy co się da (1989)
- Cisza (1993)
- Noc (1995)
- Nic nie boli, tak jak życie (1997)
- Bal wszystkich świętych (2000)
- Mokre oczy (2002)
- Jest (2004) POL #2
- Zawsze czegoś brak (2009) POL #19
- 10 lat samotności (2020)
- Skaza (2023)

=== Minialbums ===
- American Tour (1988)
- 4 Pieces to Go (1992)

=== Live albums ===
- Budka w Operze, Live from Sopot '94 (1994)
- Akustycznie (1998)
- Live at Carnegie Hall (2000)

=== Compilation albums ===
- 1974–1984 (1984)
- The Best of Urszula & Budka Suflera (1988)
- Greatest Hits (1992)
- Underground (1993)
- Greatest Hits II (1999)
- Antologia 74-99 (1999)
- Budka Suflera dla tp.internet (2000)
- The Best Of (5 track CD) (2002)
- Palę sobie... (5 track CD) (2003)
- Posluchaj sobie (5 track CD) (2003)
- Leksykon Budki Suflera 1974–2005 (2006)
- Gwiazdy Polskiej muzyki lat 80: Budka Suflera (2007)
