= Oborový podnik =

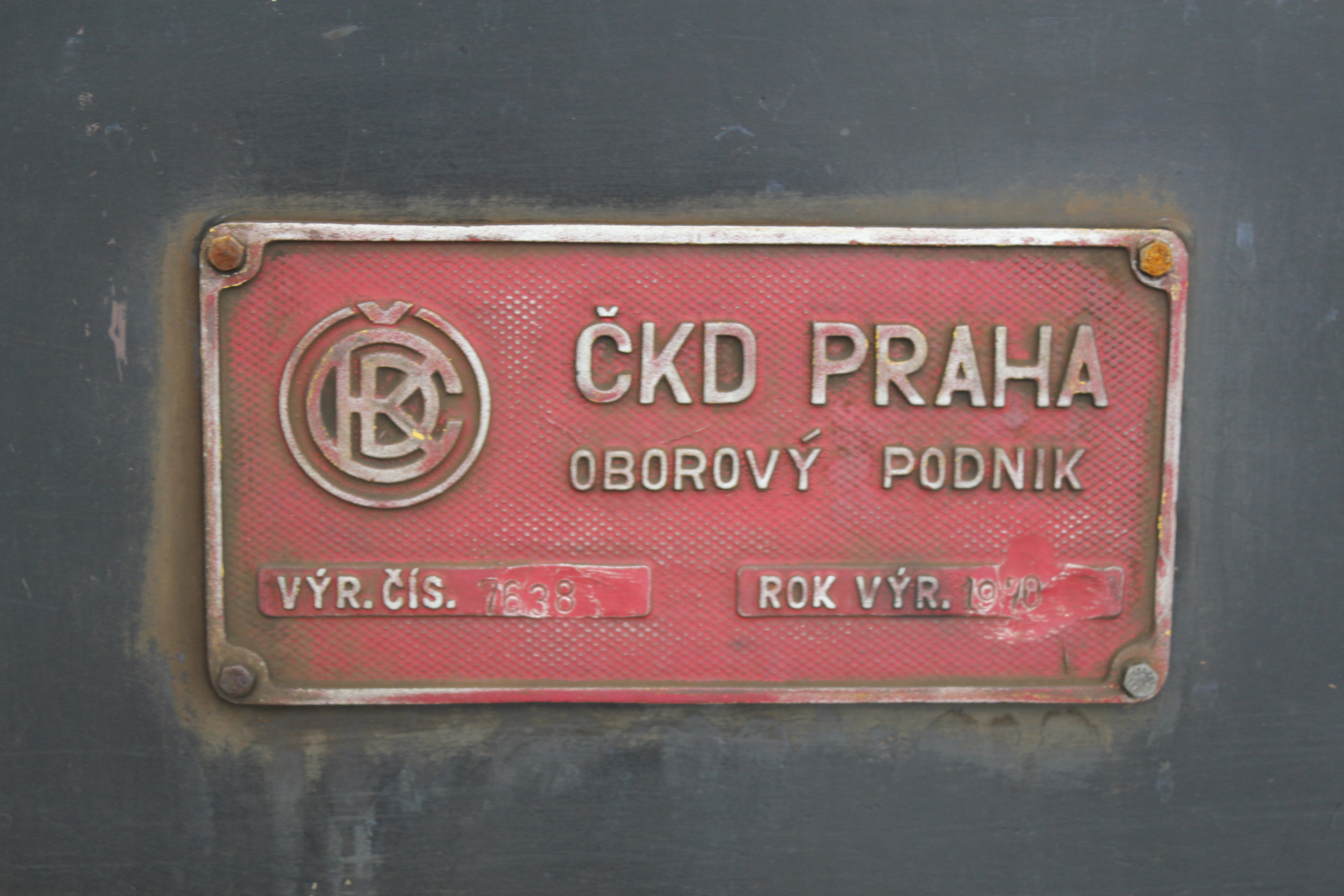
Production plate to a Czech diesel Locomotive 751 (cs) manufactured by Českomoravská Kolben-Daněk of Prague: Prod. No. 7638 Year Mfg.: 1978

Oborový podnik (o.p.; lit. 'specialized business' or 'branch enterprise') is a bygone Czechoslovak state designation for a business entity. As was always the case, the commercial name of the entity was followed by the name of its legal structure, either spelled out (viz., "Oborový podník,") or abbreviated in lower case (viz., "o.p."). An Oborový podnik was one of three kinds of productive economic units within the former Czechoslovak Socialist Republic, along with a koncern (concern) and a trust podniku (trust enterprise).

== See also ==
- Compare to Státní podnik (s.p.)
