= Státní podnik =

Státní podnik (s.p.) or štátny podnik (š.p.); (translation — "state enterprise," of a business nature) is a Czechia and Slovakia designation for a business entity owned by the government (a.k.a. "the state"). As is now and was always the case, the entity name is followed by the name of its legal structure, either spelled out (viz., "státní podnik" or "štátny podnik") or abbreviated in lower case (viz., "s.p.", "š.p.").

== Brief history ==
State enterprises (in the native language, the plural use is "státní podniky") were created in 1988 by the Czech Socialist Republic and Slovak Socialist Republic and their organizational units (cs) from the former "národní podniky" (national enterprises) under an initiative of socialist reconstruction (a.k.a. perestroika). In 1990, a new law brought decision-making power back to founders and self-management of labor collectives were abolished, leaving only a partial representation of employees in the supervisory board. The agency diminished in 1997.

== See also ==
- Compare to Oborový podnik (o.p.)
- Státní podnik (interlanguage link to the Czech language Wikipedia page)
- Podnik (interlanguage link to the Czech language Wikipedia page)
