= Soňa Červená =

Czech operatic mezzo-soprano (1925–2023)

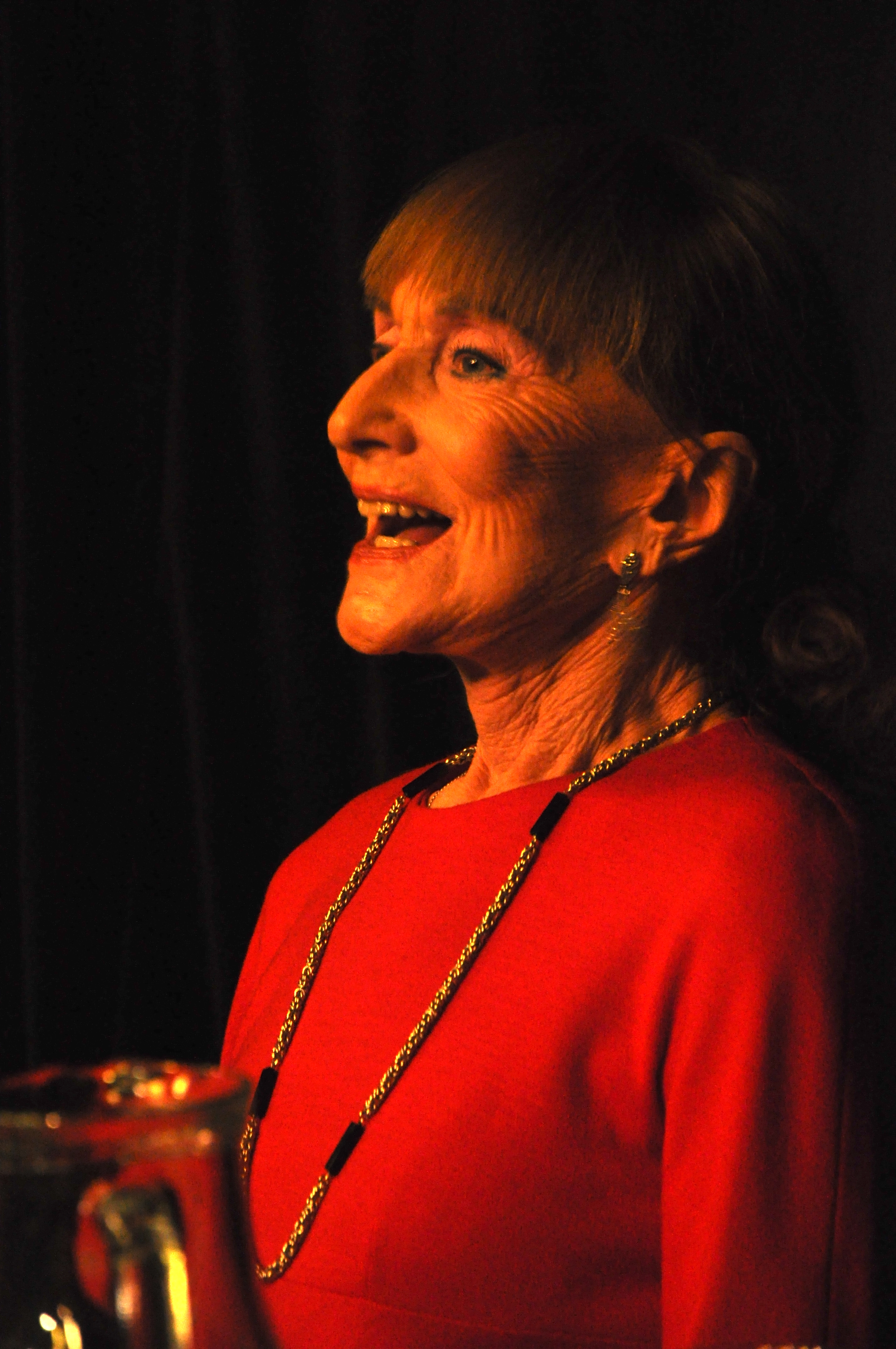
- Červená in 2012
- Born: 9 September 1925; Prague, Czechoslovakia
- Died: 7 May 2023 (aged 97); Prague, Czech Republic
- Occupations: Operatic mezzo-soprano; actress; writer
- Organizations: Oper Frankfurt; San Francisco Opera
- Title: Kammersängerin
- Father: Jiří Červený
- Relatives: Václav František Červený (great-grandfather)
- Awards: Alfréd Radok Award

Soňa Červená (9 September 1925 – 7 May 2023) was a Czech operatic mezzo-soprano, actress and writer. She had an international career as a singer from the 1950s, first at the Berlin State Opera in East Berlin and from 1962 in the West, mainly at the Oper Frankfurt and the San Francisco Opera. She was known for Bizet's Carmen, her signature role, and the title role in Der Rosenkavalier by Richard Strauss, but also performed in world premieres, and promoted Leoš Janáček's operas in Czech.

After her singing career, she turned to acting at the Thalia Theater in Hamburg where she worked with Robert Wilson. After the fall of the Iron Curtain she returned as a guest to her home country, starring as Emilia Marty in a Wilson production of The Makropulos Case at the National Theatre in Prague. She wrote an autobiography, and a biography of her great-grandfather, Václav František Červený, who was a notable brass instrument maker.

== Life and career ==
=== Family background ===
Born in Prague on 9 September 1925, Červená was the daughter of Czech writer Jiří Červený and Žofie Veselíková, and the great-granddaughter of brass instrument maker Václav František Červený. Her parents were imprisoned by the Nazis during World War II. Her mother died in a communist prison in 1948, the year of the communist coup d'état in Czechoslovakia. Červená learned about her mother's death, and with the help of a pathologist recovered her body to secretly bury her in the family grave in Prague. Červená told a reporter from The Los Angeles Times in a 1962 interview that she believed the communist authorities killed her mother.

=== Education, early career ===
Červená studied acting and singing before beginning her career in musical comedies at the age of eighteen. Because her family had no money to pay for singing lessons, she worked for three years in theater saving money to obtain them. She then studied voice with Robert Rozner and Lydia Wegner-Salmowá in Prague before beginning her career as a performer with an operetta ensemble in Prague. She made her professional opera debut in 1954 at the Janáček-Oper in Brno where she remained for the next three years. She had a major success there in the title role of Der Rosenkavalier by Richard Strauss. She repeated the role at the National Theatre in Prague.

She made her debut at the Berlin State Opera in East Berlin in 1958, again as the Rosenkavalier. She often performed there, and at the Komische Oper Berlin directed by Walter Felsenstein, until 1962, when she left the Eastern Bloc. Her roles at the State Opera included Handel's Dalinda in Ariodante and Onoria in Ezio, Orpheus in Gluck's Orpheus und Eurydike, Cherubino in Mozart's Die Hochzeit des Figaro, Frau Reich in Nicolai's Die lustigen Weiber von Windsor, Kontschakowna in Borodin's Fürst Igor, Olga in Tchaikovsky's Eugen Onegin, Erda and Rossweisse in Wagner's Der Ring des Nibelungen, the Second Maid in Elektra by Richard Strauss, a Kurtisane in Dessau's Die Verurteilung des Lukullus, and the title role of Jean Kurt Forest's Tai Yang erwacht. She was awarded the title Kammersängerin in 1960 for her portrayal of Orpheus, at the time the youngest woman earning the title.

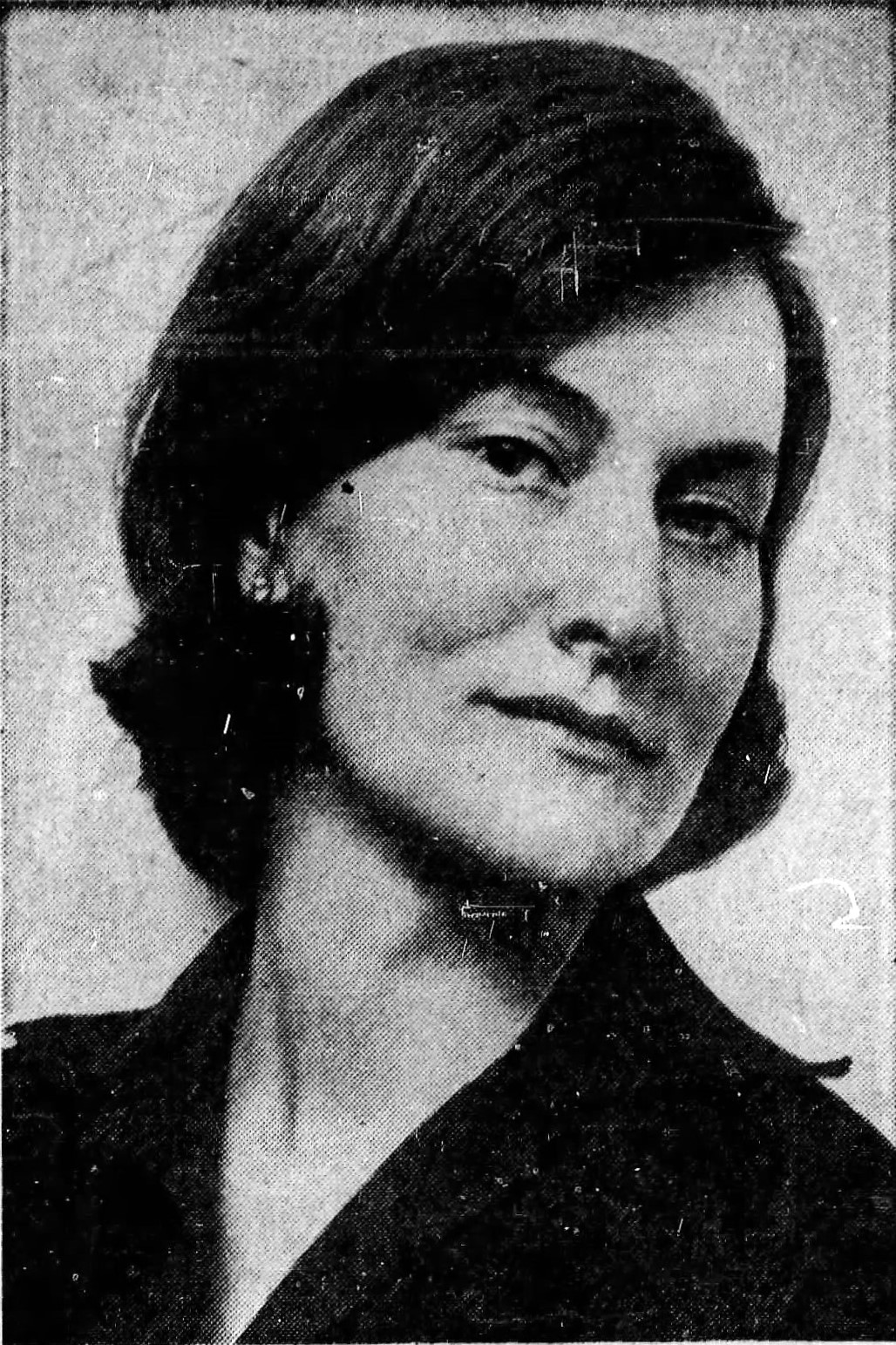
Červená c. 1963

She sang in a wide variety of guest performances, including the world premiere of Rudolf Wagner-Régeny's Das Bergwerk zu Falun at the Salzburg Festival in 1961, at the Semperoper, the Vienna State Opera, and the Prague Spring Festival. In 1961, she recorded Bizet's Carmen (which became her signature role) with the Leipzig Opera conducted by Herbert Kegel and sung in German.

=== Western Europe and the United States ===
Červená escaped to West Berlin in January 1962, and said that she could not sing in a country that was not free. She was first engaged at the Deutsche Oper Berlin and then became a principal artist at the Oper Frankfurt, taking residence there. She appeared there as Carmen in 1963. Her roles also included the Fortuneteller in Prokofiev's The Fiery Angel, and the Kabanicha in Janáček's Káťa Kabanová. The latter was staged in 1978 by Volker Schlöndorff in his first operatic production, starring Hildegard Behrens in the title role, and was presented at the Edinburgh Festival. She took part in the first production in Frankfurt of Luigi Nono's Al gran sole carico d'amore in 1977.

She appeared at La Scala in Milan, in Amsterdam and Paris, the Bayreuth Festival and the Glyndebourne Festival, as well as in Los Angeles and Chicago. She collaborated with conductors such as Pierre Boulez, Herbert von Karajan, Rafael Kubelík, Charles Mackerras and Francesco Molinari Pradelli. Červená made several appearances at the Bayreuth Festival, including as Floßhilde in Der Ring des Nibelungen in 1960, Rossweisse in 1966 and 1967, and as a Flower Maiden in Parsifal (1962–63 and 1966–67). She appeared as Countess Geschwitz in Alban Berg's Lulu in a 1966 production of the Staatsoper Stuttgart, directed by Wieland Wagner and alongside Anja Silja in the title role. It was also presented at the Edinburgh Festival, where she also performed as Baba the Turk in Stravinsky's The Rake's Progress in 1967, and as Carolina in Henze's Elegy for Young Lovers several times.

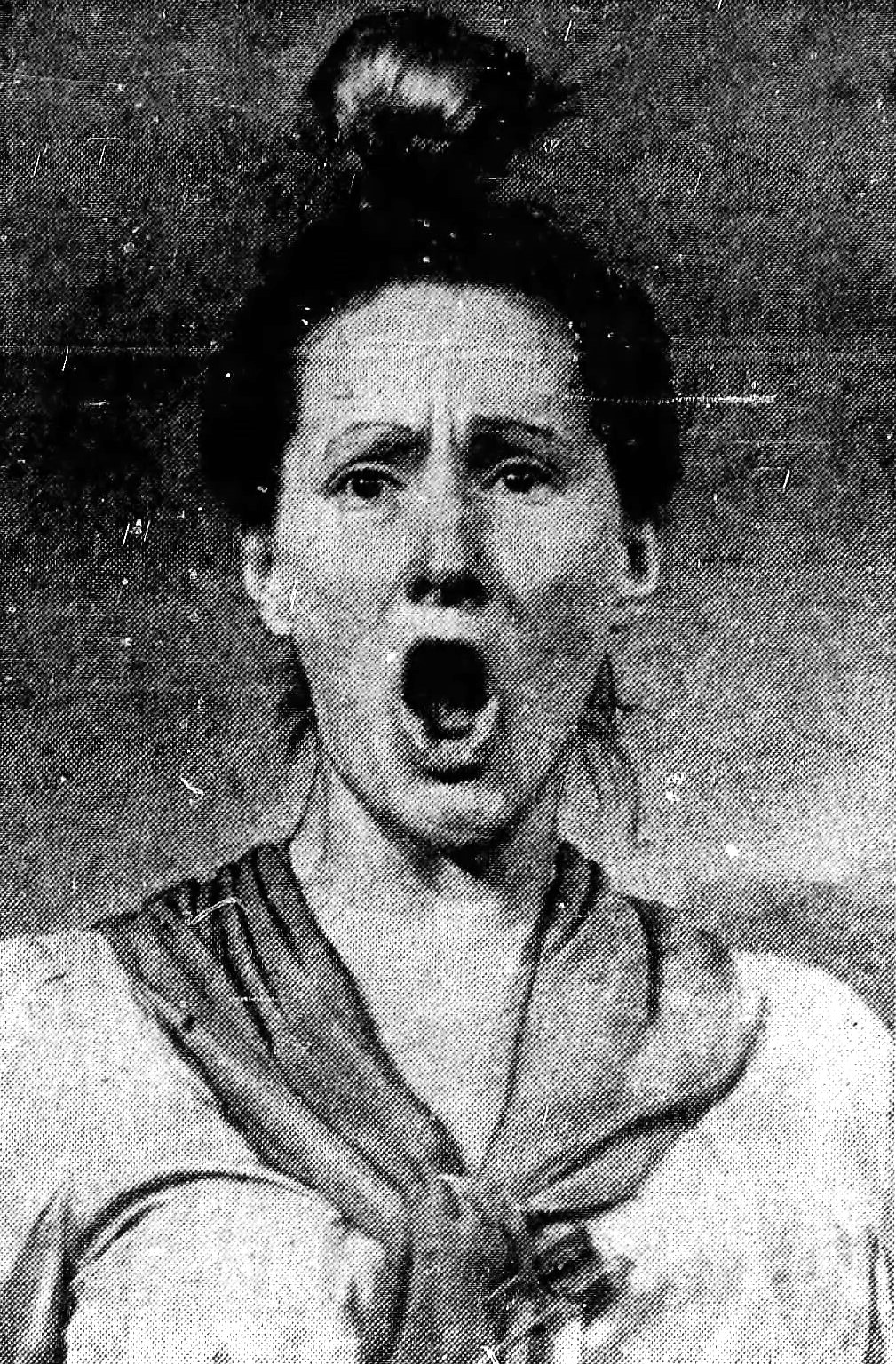
As Berta, 1963

Throughout the 1960s, 1970s, and 1980s, she traveled widely, performing all over the Western world. She appeared as Clairon at the 1963 and 1964 Glyndebourne Festivals. With the London Symphony Orchestra she performed as a soloist in Beethoven's Missa solemnis. In 1971 she made her debut at the Lyric Opera of Chicago as Herodias. In 1981 she sang in the world premiere of Antonio Bibalo's Ghosts at the Opernhaus Kiel. In 1983 she again portrayed Kabanicha, at La Monnaie. She was instrumental in promoting Janáček's operas in Czech.

==== San Francisco Opera ====
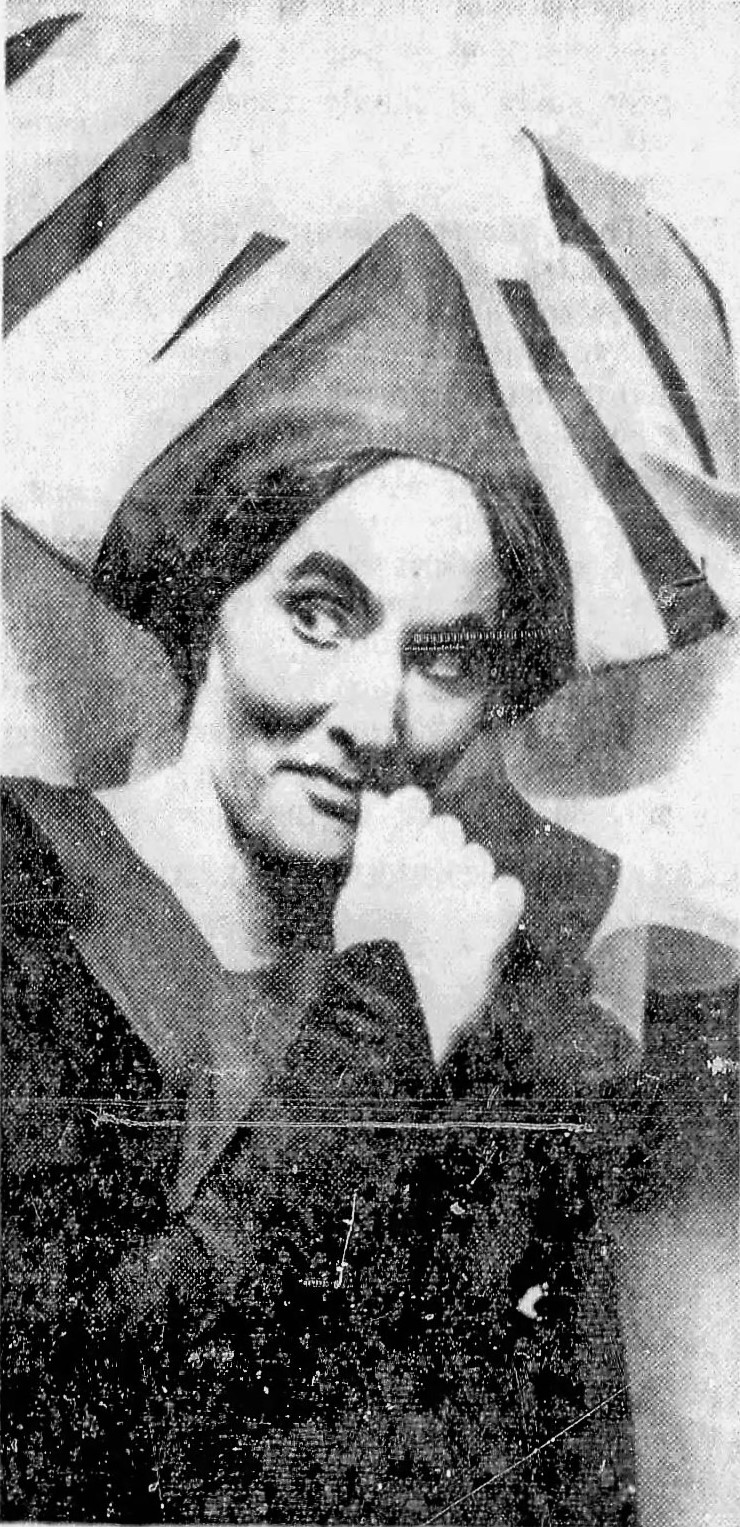
As Quickly, 1966

In 1962, Červená made her United States debut at the San Francisco Opera as Carmen. A review in the Oakland Tribune praised her performance for her acting ability, vocal flexibility and range, and her "adroit capacity of tone shading". The review in The Province from Vancouver, British Columbia, called Červená "magnificent" in the role and deemed the performance "the best Carmen San Francisco has ever had". She would go on to perform the role of Carmen more than 100 times. She returned almost annually to San Francisco through 1971 in roles in which she transformed from the dark-haired beauty Anna in Les Troyens by Berlioz, to the impish Quickly in Verdi's Falstaff, the provocative Innkeeper in Mussorgski's Boris Godunov, and to Countess Geschwitz again, which was described as an "ideal interpretation" by the Oakland Tribune. Her performance of Berta in Rossini's Il barbiere di Siviglia was noted as a "standout" comedic interpretation in a cast of comedians. Her versatility in drastically changing her appearance and lack of fear of appearing ugly, as well as her acting training and singing ability, gave her the opportunity to play varied characters.

Bay Area critics noted even her minor roles, calling Červená's performance as one of the evil step-sisters, Tisbe in Rossini's La Cenerentola, "excellent", and her role as the wife of a corrupt official in the United States premiere of Gunther Schuller's The Visitation, "most impressive". Other roles she performed in San Francisco included Azucena in Verdi's Il trovatore, Clairon in Capriccio by Richard Strauss, Countess de Coigny in Giordano's Andrea Chénier, as Rossweiße, Fricka and the First Norn in Wagner's Ring, Herodias in Salome by R. Strauss, Marcellina in Mozart's Le nozze di Figaro, the Marquise of Birkenfeld in Donizetti's La fille du régiment, Marthe Schwertlein in Gounod's Faust, and the mother in Charpentier's Louise. Her performance as Prince Orlofsky in Strauss's Die Fledermaus received a varied critical response. Kenneth Rexroth thought it was perfectly cast. He especially noted that Červená was not getting critical acclaim in the 1965 season, but described her singing as "full of color, character and throaty accents". Martin Bernheimer on the other hand, described Červená's Orlofsky as missing the essential tone for the caricature and noted her trouble with vocal descents and the English text. After a nine-year absence, Červená returned to San Francisco in 1980 to portray Countess Waldner in Arabella by R. Strauss, Flora in Verdi's La traviata, Mamma Lucia in Mascagni's Cavalleria Rusticana, and Starenka Buryjovka in Janáček's Jenůfa.

=== Acting career after retirement from opera ===
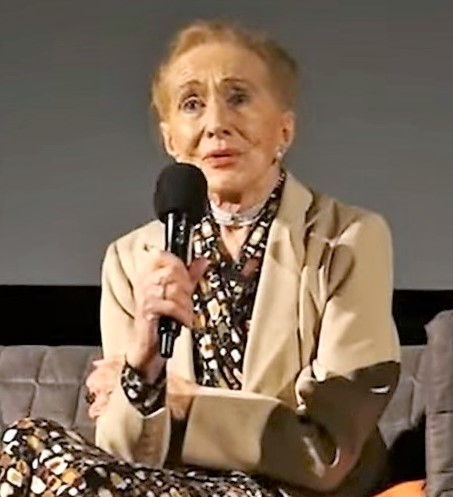
Červená in 2007

After retiring from the opera stage, Červená moved to Hamburg in 1989 and turned to acting at the Thalia Theater where she worked with director Robert Wilson. After the fall of the Iron Curtain she returned to her home country and starred as Emilia Marty in Karel Čapek's play The Makropulos Case, directed by Wilson, at the National Theatre in Prague.

Červená performed on 29 September 2022 in Jan Zástěra's oratorio Saint Ludmila at the Lateran Basilica in Rome on the occasion of the Czech presidency of the Council of the European Union.

== Personal life ==
Červená authored a memoir, published in 1999, Heimweh verboten – Mein Stück Theater- und Weltgeschichte (Homesickness Forbidden: My Piece of Theatre and World History). She also wrote a biography of her great-grandfather Václav František Červený, one of the most important brass instrument makers of the 19th century, entitled "Grüß Gott, Herr Cerven".

Červená died in a hospital in Prague on 7 May 2023, at age 97.

== Awards ==
Červená was awarded the title Kammersängerin in 1960. In 2004, she was honoured with a Czech Thalia Award. She was awarded the Alfréd Radok Award for Best Actress in 2008. In 2013, she received both the Gold Medal from the John F. Kennedy Center for the Performing Arts in Washington, and a Czech state decoration. The 26897 Červená asteroid is named after her.
