= Paulo Monteiro (artist) =

Brazilian painter

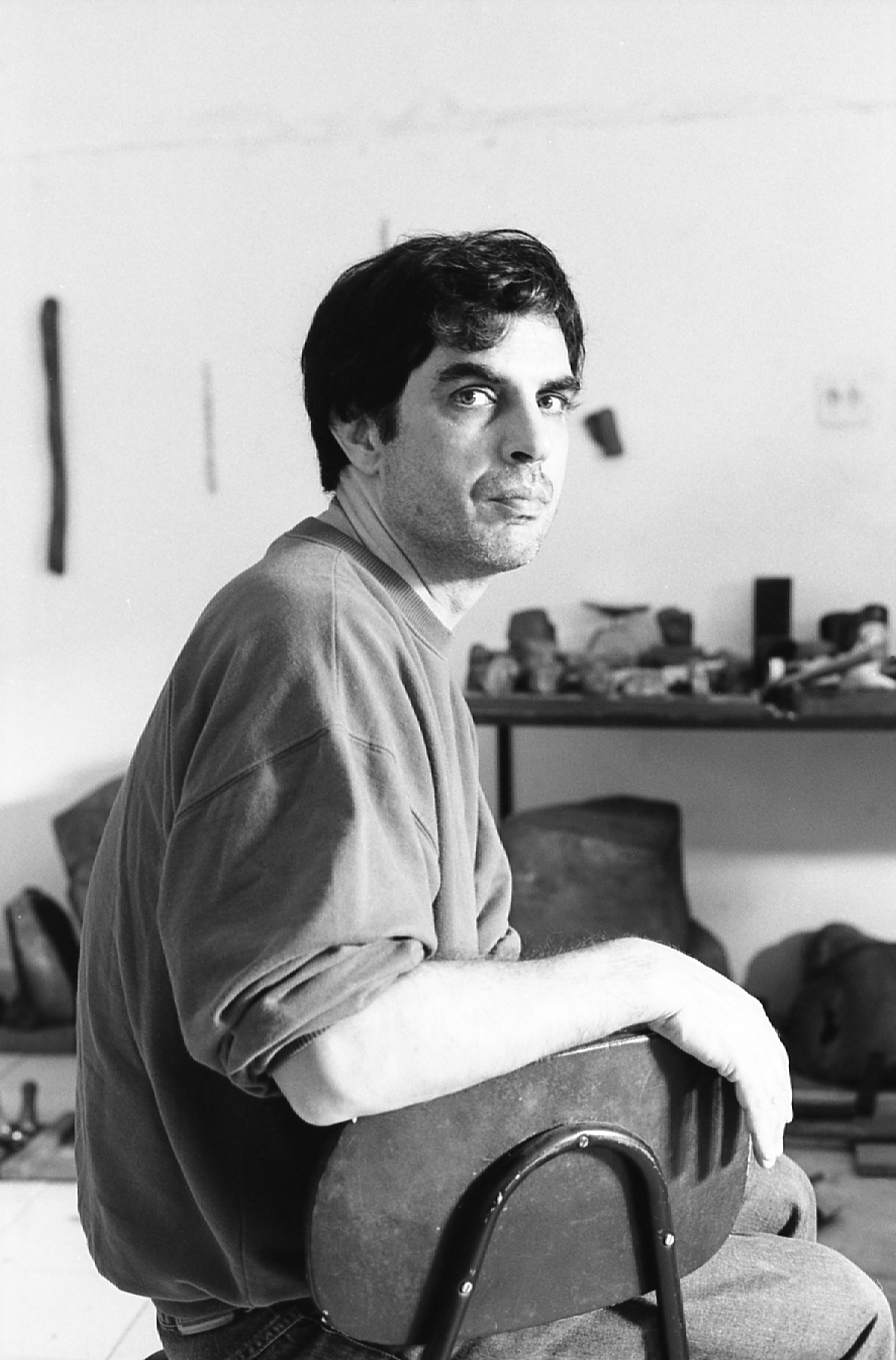
- Fotografia: Maycon Lima
- Born: Paulo Bacellar Mnonteiro; June 8, 1961; São Paulo, Brazil
- Known for: Painter, sculpture, printmaking, drawing
- Movement: Contemporary art

Paulo Monteiro is a Brazilian artist who was born in São Paulo in 1961. He is a painter, sculptor and designer. In the 80s he was one of the founders of "Casa7" group. Participated in two Biennales of São Paulo (1985 and 1994). Lives and works in São Paulo, Brazil. Some of his works are in important collections, Museum of Modern Art (MoMA), São Paulo Museum of Modern Art, Pinacoteca do Estado de São Paulo, Rio de Janeiro Museum of Modern Art, Niterói Contemporary Art Museum; Start Museum, Shanghai.

== 1970s ==
From 1977 Monteiro attended Colegio Equipe Secondary School in São Paulo; fellow students included Fabio Miguez, Antonio Malta, Rodrigo Andrade, Branco Melo, Nando Reis, Leda Catunda, together with the filmmaker Cao Hamburger and the writers, Augusto Massi and Arnaldo Antunes. Towards the end of the 1970s he contributed to magazines from the subculture of São Paulo, including Boca and Almanak 80 and created front cover designs for three unique editions of Papagaio. His drawings were influenced by George McMannus, Robert Crumb and Luiz Sa.

== 1980s ==
In 1981 he began to paint regularly, inspired by the late work of Philip Guston in the XVI Bienal of São Paulo. In 1983 he formed the group Casa 7 with Fabio Miguez, Rodrigo Andrade, Carlito Carvalhosa, Nuno Ramos and, initially, the painter, Antonio Malta. In 1985 the group was invited to exhibit at the XVIII Bienal of São Paulo and from that time it was known throughout Brazil.

In 1986 he began to produce three-dimensional sculpture, using lengths of pipe and wood. This work was shown in the II Bienal of Havana in Cuba. During the mid-1980s he met Mira Schendel, to whom he dedicated his first book of drawings, published in 1991. Earlier he had begun work at the Art Studio Raquel Arnaud, where he had his first individual exhibition of sculpture in 1987.

== 1990s ==
In 1991 he co-curated the Goeldi Collection, which had, as its first release, a book with eighteen drawings from Monteiro, accompanied by a text from Alberto Tassinari. Later the editors released the first monograph on the work of Amilcar de Castro and also a special edition of Nuno Ramos book Cujo. In 1992, Monteiro began to work at the Centro Cultural São Paulo, where he remained until 2010.

In 1993 he won first prize at the IV Bienal of Santos/SP and had an individual exhibition of sculpture, paintings and drawings in the Paulo Figueiredo Art Gallery in São Paulo.

He contributed to the XXII Bienal of São Paulo in 1994 with lead sculpture. In 1999 he was awarded the Bolsa Vitae de Artes Visuais.

== 2000s ==
From 2000 to 2009, Monteiro was once again painting, always exploring the margins and limits of shape. These paintings evolved, decreasing in gesture and culminating with a group of gouaches. Describing the art, Rodrigo Andrade states: “A very subtle sense of humour affirms the consciousness of its strangeness, of its nature — almost grotesque — and the colours emerge like the easiest thing in the world”.

In 2008 the Pinacoteca Estadual de São Paulo staged a retrospective of Monteiro's work, from 1989 to 2008, curated by Taisa Palhares and, with the partnership of the editors Cosac and Naify, the first monograph of Paulo Monteiro work was released.

== 2010s ==
In 2013 Monteiro exhibited his work at Mendes Wood Gallery in São Paulo. In the following year, the Museum of Modern Art, New York, acquired twelve of his artworks.
