= Alex Cerveny =

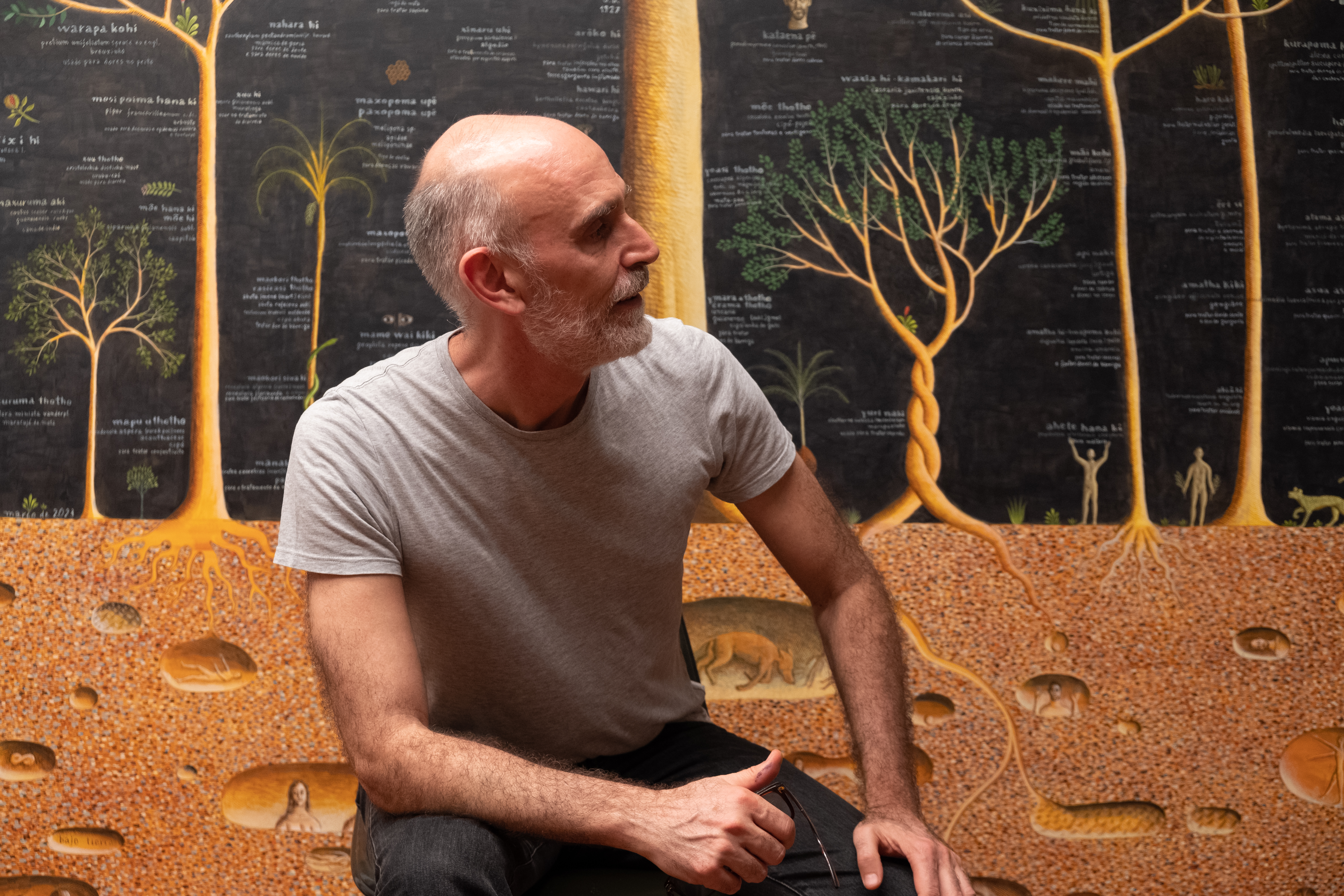
- Born: 1963 (age 62–63); São Paulo, Brazil
- Occupation: Artist
- Website: alexcerveny.com

Alexandro Júlio de Oliveira Cerveny (São Paulo, Brazil, 1963) is a Brazilian artist, printmaker, sculptor, illustrator, and painter. His works evoke a fantastic universe and explore an iconography that articulates historical references, everyday culture, and personal memories.

Cerveny participated in the 21st São Paulo Art Biennial in 1991 and exhibited in shows at the Fondation Cartier pour l'Art Contemporain, Triennale Milano, La Galleria Nazionale di Roma, Biennale of Sydney, and Power Station of Art Shangai. In 2023, he held the solo exhibition Mirabilia at Pinacoteca de São Paulo, which featured more than 100 works created during his 40-year career. His work is part of the collections of the Fondation Cartier pour l'Art Contemporain, Pinacoteca de São Paulo, São Paulo Museum of Modern Art, Rio de Janeiro Museum of Modern Art, Museu de Arte do Rio, Iberê Camargo Foundation, and Tamarind Institute.

== Career ==
=== Visual arts ===
Independently educated, Cerveny studied drawing and painting with Valdir Sarubbi from 1978 to 1982, metal engraving and printing techniques with Selma D’Affre from 1982 to 1986, and attended a free lithography course with Odair Magalhães at FAAP in 1982. In the early 1980s, he joined the Piolin Circus Arts Academy and the Picadeiro Circus School as a contortionist, an experience that strongly influenced his visual universe.

In 1987 and 1990, he participated in the Panorama da Arte Atual Brasileira (Panorama of Current Brazilian Art) at the São Paulo Museum of Modern Art and, in 1991, in the 21st São Paulo Art Biennial, the same year he won the Culture Secretariat Prize for the series Astronomia Babilônica. In the 2000s, he offered various art workshops and participated in educational projects in collaboration with institutions such as the CEDAC Educational Community, Tomie Ohtake Institute, SESC, and the Paraty International Literary Festival. In 2019, he released the book Todos os Lugares on the occasion of his solo exhibition of the same name, described by the artist as an "illustrated glossary of places, enriched with random and almost always true stories."

Cerveny participated in group exhibitions such as Siamo Foresta at Triennale Milano (2023), 23rd Biennale of Sydney: rīvus (2022), Planet B: Climate Change & the New Sublime at Palazzo Bollani (2022), and Nous les Arbres at Fondation Cartier pour l'Art Contemporain (2019). In 2023, he held the solo exhibition Mirabilia at Pinacoteca de São Paulo, which showcased more than 100 works created during his 40-year career, including paintings, engravings, ceramic tiles, and bronze sculptures.

Cerveny is represented by Millan in São Paulo.

=== Illustration ===
In addition to his career in visual arts, Cerveny also works as an illustrator, having collaborated for years with the newspaper Folha de São Paulo and illustrated books such as 50 Poemas Macabros by Vinicius de Moraes (Companhia das Letras, 2023), On the Origin of Species by Charles Darwin (Ubu Editora, 2018), The Decameron by Giovanni Boccaccio (Cosac Naify, 2013), for which he received the Jabuti Illustration Award in 2014, and The Adventures of Pinocchio by Carlo Collodi (Cosac Naify, 2012).

In 2005, his production as an illustrator was presented in the exhibition Desenhos de Ilustração at Estação Pinacoteca.

== Collections ==
- Fondation Cartier pour l'Art Contemporain, Paris, France
- Pinacoteca de São Paulo, São Paulo, Brazil
- São Paulo Museum of Modern Art, São Paulo, Brazil
- Rio de Janeiro Museum of Modern Art, Rio de Janeiro, Brazil
- Museu de Arte do Rio, Rio de Janeiro, Brazil
- Coleção de Arte da Cidade, São Paulo, Brazil
- Iberê Camargo Foundation, Porto Alegre, Brazil
- Tamarind Institute, Albuquerque, New Mexico, USA
- Museum of Contemporary Art of Paraná, Curitiba, Brazil
