= Jolana (guitar brand) =

Czech electric guitar brand

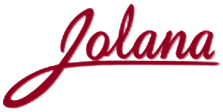
- Company type: Brand of NBE Corp.
- Industry: Musical instruments
- Founded: 1959
- Founder: Josef Růžička
- Fate: Company ceased; "Jolana" brand relaunched in 2003
- Headquarters: Hořovice, Czech Republic
- Area served: Europe, United States
- Products: Electric guitars, Basses
- Owner: NBE Corp
- Number of employees: 40
- Website: jolanaguitars.com

Jolana is a Czech brand of electric guitars and basses, manufactured by New Bohemian Electronics (NBE) company. It was also a Czechoslovak guitar manufacturing company from 1960 to near 1989. Especially during the 1960s, it gained popularity in the United Kingdom, with famous musicians such as George Harrison, Jimmy Page, Andrzej Ziółkowski / Boguslaw Andrew Ziolkowski (Stowarzyszenie Cnót Wszelkich / Budka Suflera), Romuald Lipko / Romuald Ryszard Lipko (Stowarzyszenie Cnót Wszelkich / Budka Suflera) and Eric Clapton using its guitar models.

New Bohemian Electronics (NBE), which acquired the rights for the Jolana brand in 2003.

== History ==
The history of musical instruments manufacturing in former Czechoslovakia started when engineer Ferdinand Machalek created the first piano pickup in the middle 1940s. The origins of the first electric guitars date back to 1953, when the Resonet factory managed by Josef Růžička designed the first instruments in the country. The company manufactured not only guitars but other wooden goods, including furniture. Designer Vladimir Vlček created the first model, a lap steel named "Akord" which came into production in 1954. It was followed by other Resonet's guitars, "Arioso" and "Arco". Those models were commercially successful, being awarded at the Expo 58 in Brussels.

The "Grazioso", a model based on the Fender Stratocaster, was an immediate success not only in Czechoslovakia but outside the country as well. The model was exported by Resonet under the name "Futurama", with notable musicians such as George Harrison, Jimmy Page and Eric Clapton among its users. The instrument's success was partly due to a UK embargo on US imports only lifted in 1959.

In 1959, a new guitar factory, Neoton, opened in Hradec Králové. Managed by Růžička, it was soon renamed "Jolana" – likely after Růžička's daughter's name–. The first Jolana guitar was made in 1960. Semi-acoustic models ("Diskant" and the successful "Tornado" in 1963, then followed by the "Alexandra") were also designed by Jolana, expanding its offer. Moreover, "Alexis" and "Pampero" (bass versions of Alexandra and Tornado models) came out in 1965. That same year, a new solid body guitar was introduced, the "Hurricane", with its bass version, "Typhoon", in 1965.

The Harmonika company was in charge of Tornado production in the town of Hořovice. By the late 1960s, three major factories produced electric guitars in the CSSR: ČSHN, Varhany Krnov and the aforementioned Harmonika. 1975 marked the beginning of production of Jolana guitars in the Harmonika Horovice factory. Jolana continued making electric guitars and basses until the end of the 1980s, developing models such as "Diamant" – a Gibson Les Paul copy.

Harmonika (later known as "Delicia") started to manufacture several models such as Cavallero, Tornado, Basora, Diskant 2, Marina 2, Onyx, Jantar, Strat, Studio and Studio Bass.

=== OEM Production ===
In 1988 Harmonika began Original Equipment Manufacturing production of Kramer Guitars under the direction of Schaller GmbH as Kramer was going through bankruptcy. Jolana produced the last Kramer models using left over Kramer parts (guitar bodies made by ESP Guitars) and original Schaller hardware even after the company's collapse in 1991.

In 1993, Delicia was acquired by "Bohemia Musico S.R.O.", becoming "Bohemia Musico Delicia". The company began OEM production of guitars for renewed foreign brands such as Epiphone, Hohner, Spector, American Showster, MTD and others.

In 2003, "New Bohemian Electronics Corp" (NBE), a manufacturing company established two years before, bought the brand "Jolana" to Delicia, which therefore ceased to produce guitars, focusing on other instruments. NBE is currently the largest manufacturer of electric string instruments in Europe. After that, NBE resumed the production of some Jolana guitar models (Grazioso, Tornado, Diamant), remaining active to the present day.

== Models ==
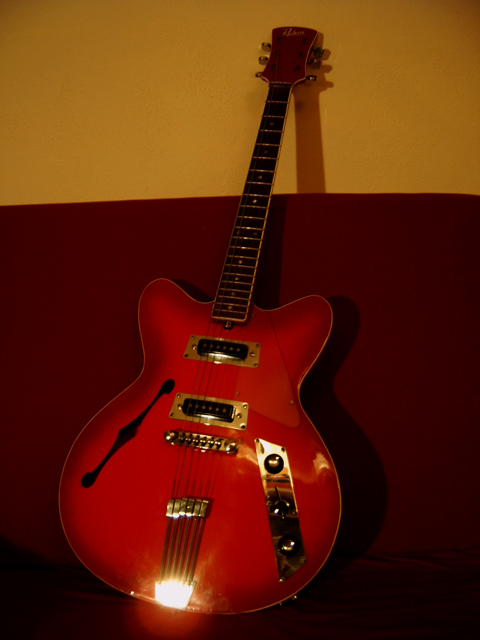
Semi-acoustic guitar model, Rubín

A peculiarity of some models is that the same body was used for guitar and bass, which reduced production costs. Nevertheless, the two versions differ in scale of their neck and the specific hardware.

1. Chord
2. Basso V
3. Neoton
4. Marina
5. Basora
6. Alexandra
7. Alexis II
8. Basso IV
9. Pedro
10. Star VII
11. Sirius
12. Star
13. Big Beat
14. Hurricane
15. Diskant
16. Alfa
17. Star IX
18. Basso IX
19. Basso X
20. Tornado
21. Graziela special II
22. Special
23. Rubin: Guitar + Bass
24. Kolorbas
25. Studio: Guitar + Bass
26. Diamant: Guitar + Bass
27. Onyx
28. Vikomt: Guitar + Bass
29. Iris: Guitar + Bass
30. Altro
31. Superstar: Guitar + Bass
32. Disco: Guitar + Bass
33. Galaxis : Guitar + Bass
34. Jantar: Guitar + Bass
35. D Bass
36. Strat
37. Proxima: Guitar + Bass
38. RK120
39. RK140
40. RK Bass
41. Typhoon
42. Uragan
