= Amati Kraslice =

Czech manufacturer of musical instruments

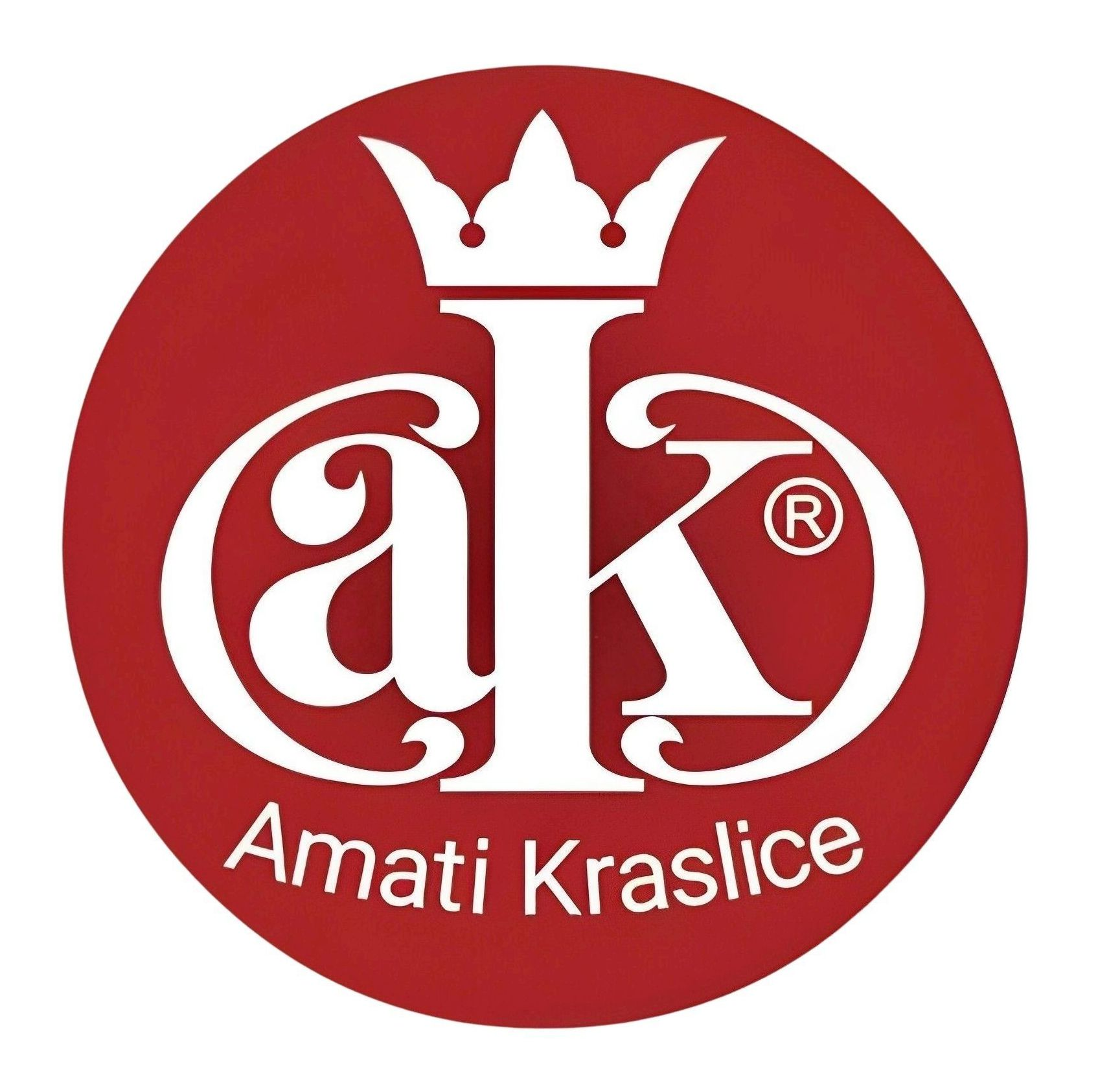

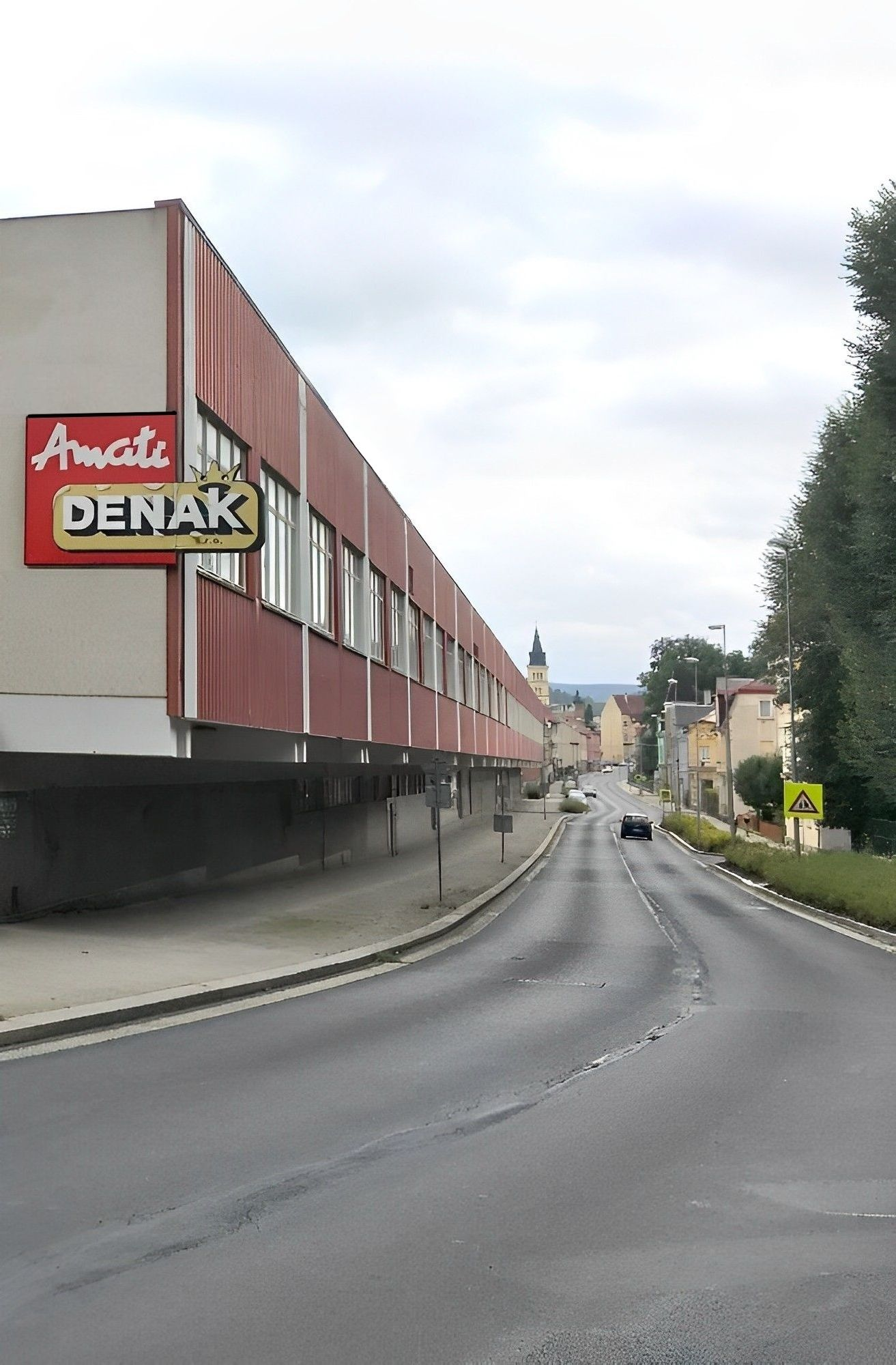
- Former factory building in Kraslice, 2020
- Company type: Cooperative
- Industry: Musical instruments
- Founded: 1948; 78 years ago
- Founder: State of Czechoslovakia (Ninth-of-May Constitution)
- Headquarters: Kraslice, Czech Republic
- Area served: Worldwide
- Products: Brass instruments; Woodwind instruments; Saxophones
- Owner: RIQ Investments
- Website: www.amati.cz

Amati Kraslice is a manufacturer of wind and percussion instruments based in Kraslice, Czech Republic. It was formed in 1948 as a national cooperative of several extant manufacturers, and privatised in 1993 after the dissolution of Czechoslovakia.

== History ==
Before World War II, the town of Kraslice was mostly German-speaking, like the rest of Sudetenland, and was known in German as Graslitz. The area and its towns around the border of Bohemia and Saxony became known as the Musikwinkel (lit. 'music corner'), famous for its concentration of historical, specialized musical instrument manufacturers. Kraslice housed 59 manufacturers before the war, among them Hüller & Co, Bohland & Fuchs, A.K. Hüttl, and Julius Keilwerth. During the war, much of the manufacturing capacity was converted to war-time use, and others had to halt production.

After the war, the newly restored government of President Beneš aimed to make the state of Czechoslovakia entirely Slavic, and initiated a large scale expulsion of ethnic Germans. Most of the German-speaking population of Kraslice was expelled to Germany. Many of the expelled instrument makers would continue their businesses in the adjoining German parts of the Musikwinkel area in what is now Vogtlandkreis, which includes the towns of Markneukirchen, Klingenthal, and Schöneck.

Meanwhile, the remaining musical instrument manufacturers in Kraslice (now mostly ethnic Czechs) were organized into a cooperative of musical instrument manufacturers, named Amati after the famous Amati family of violin makers. In 1948, it was nationalized by the newly elected communist regime, along with all other manufacturing and agriculture.

Amati was privatized in 1993 after the dissolution of Czechoslovakia and became one of the largest instrument manufacturers in Europe. It changed its name to Amati – Denak (Denak for dechové nástroje Kraslice, lit. 'wind instruments Kraslice'). The company owned the Amati, Stowasser, and V. F. Červený & Synové brands, which used to be independent companies themselves. The main factory of the company is located in the western part of the Czech Republic in Kraslice, and its Červený factory was located in Hradec Králové.

In 1994, Czech President Václav Havel presented his American counterpart, Bill Clinton, with an Amati tenor saxophone, on which Clinton played at the Reduta Jazz Club in Prague.

In 2016, Amati – Denak was purchased by British band instrument manufacturer Geneva Instruments. In 2020, Amati – Denak was declared insolvent and closed its Červený factory in Hradec Králové. In 2021, the organisation was purchased by Brno-based RIQ Investments for 26.5 million Kč and restructured as a cooperative with the name Amati Kraslice. As of 2025, Amati has between 100 and 199 employees.

== Products ==
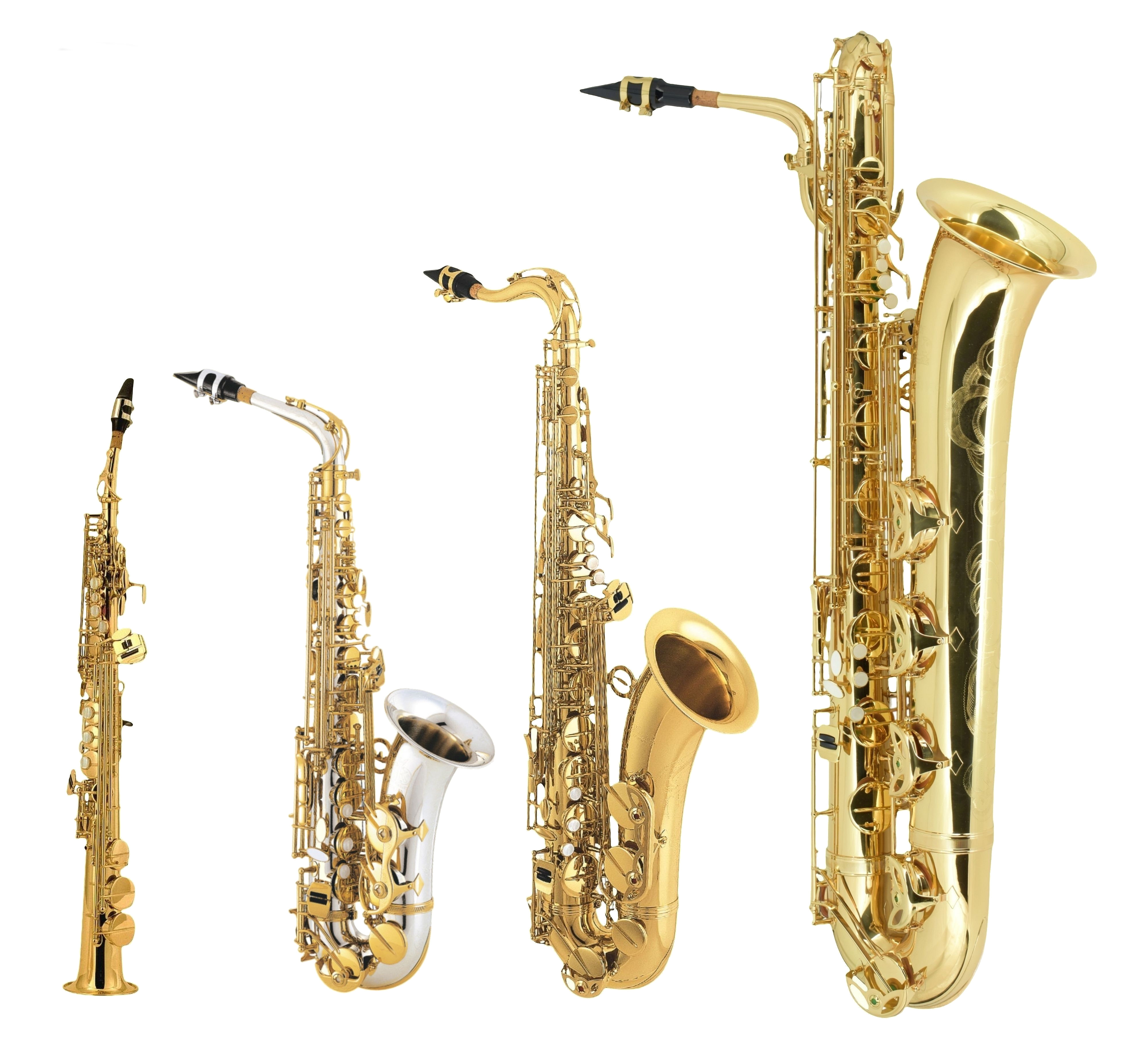
Saxophones by Amati; from left: soprano, alto, tenor, and baritone

Amati Kraslice manufactures wind musical instruments, clarinets, trumpets, flutes, bassoons, saxophones, tubas, instrument cases, stands, and other accessories. Amati also provides tours where visitors can see how their instruments are made, throughout the process.

== Distribution ==
Amati Kraslice distributes its products to the continents of Europe, America, Asia, Africa, and Australia.
