= 1818 in music =

This is a list of music-related events in 1818.

== Events ==
- April 12 – Heinrich Stölzel and Friedrich Blühmel patent the first brass instrument valve.
- June 10 – The Teatro Nuovo at Pesaro in the Papal States of Italy opens with a performance of Gioacchino Rossini's La gazza ladra conducted by the composer in the town of his birth (the theatre is later renamed in his honor).
- September – Soprano Giuditta Pasta makes her Venice début.
- October 12 – The first National Theatre Munich opens as a home for the Bavarian State Opera with a performance of Ferdinand Fränzl's Die Weihe.
- October 16 – The first work for the newly invented valved horn is played, Concertino für drei Waldhörner und ein chromatisches Ventilhorn, by composer-performer Georg Abraham Schneider.
- December 24 – The Christmas carol "Silent Night" (Stille Nacht) with words by the priest Josef Mohr set to music by organist Franz Xaver Gruber is first performed at St. Nikolaus parish church in Oberndorf bei Salzburg in Austria.
- date unknown
  - Johann Nepomuk Schelble founds the Society of St Cecilia at Frankfurt.
  - Beethoven receives the gift of a piano from Thomas Broadwood of the London manufacturers John Broadwood & Sons.

== Bands formed ==
- Besses o' th' Barn brass band is formed in Whitefield, near Manchester, England, by this date.

== Popular music ==
- "The Crimson Banner", words and music by William Blacker
- "Silent Night" (words by Joseph Mohr, music by Franz Xaver Gruber)
- "Thou Bonnie Wood of Craigielea" (words by Robert Tannahill, music by James Barr)

== Classical music ==
All of the following items are found in the IMSLP/Petrucci Music Library.

- George Anderson – The Battle of Waterloo
- Heinrich Baermann – Clarinet Concertino, Op. 29
- Ludwig van Beethoven – Piano Sonata in B flat "Hammerklavier" Op.106
- Bernhard Henrik Crusell – Clarinet Concerto No. 2, Op. 5
- Franz Danzi
  - Symphony in D major, P. 223
  - Concerto Concertant, P. 227
  - Clarinet Potpourri No. 2, P. 246
  - Flute Sonatina in D major, P. 257
  - Clarinet Sonata in B-flat major
- Friedrich Dotzauer – Oboe Quartet, Op. 37
- Federigo Fiorillo – 3 Duos, Op. 31
- Mauro Giuliani – Variations on "Deh! calma oh ciel" from Othello, Op. 101
- Johann Neopmuk Hummel – Adagio, Variationen und Rondo über ein russisches Thema, Op. 78
- Franz Krommer – String Trio, Op. 96
- Karol Józef Lipiński – Variations, Op. 5
- Sigismund Neukomm – Symphony, Op. 19
- George Onslow – 3 Piano Trios, Op. 14
- Anton Reicha – Wind Quintets, Op. 88
- Franz Schubert
  - Adagio in D-flat major, D. 505
  - 4 Polonaises, D. 599
  - 3 Marches héroïques, D. 602
  - Fantasy in C major, D. 605a
  - March in E major, D. 606
  - Rondo in D major, D. 608
  - Die Geselligkeit, D. 609
  - Trio in E major, D. 610
  - Piano Sonata No.10, D. 613
  - Sonata for Piano Duet, D. 617
  - Polonaise in B-flat major, D. 618a
  - 8 Variations on a French Song, D. 624
  - Piano Sonata No. 11, D.625
  - Blanka, D.631
  - 3 Marches militaires, D.733
  - 6 Grandes marches, D.819
  - Symphony No. 6
- Louis Spohr - String Quartet No. 11 in E, Op. 43
- Jan Václav Voříšek – 12 Rhapsodies, Op. 1

== Opera ==
- Michele Carafa – Berenice in Siria
- Gaetano Donizetti – Enrico di Borgogna
- Giovanni Pacini – Atala
- Gioacchino Rossini – Mosè in Egitto

== Births ==
- January 14 – Zacharias Topelius, lyricist and historian (died 1898)
- February 6 or August 7– Henry Litolff, keyboard virtuoso and composer (d. 1891)
- March 1 (2) – Giulio Briccialdi, composer (d. 1881)
- March 11
  - Antonio Bazzini, composer and violinist (died 1897)
  - Marius Petipa, Russian ballet dancer (died 1910)
- March 31 – Carolina Granberg, Swedish ballerina (d. 1884)
- April 6 – Aasmund Olavsson Vinje, lyricist and author (died 1870)
- April 19 – Manuel Saumell, composer (d. 1870)
- June 17 – Charles Gounod, composer (d. 1893)
- June 28 – Cesare Ciardi, composer and musician (died 1871)
- July 1 – Henrietta Treffz, operatic mezzo-soprano and first wife of Johann Strauss II (d. 1878)
- August 7 – Henry Charles Litolff, composer and virtuoso (died 1891)
- September 12 – Theodor Kullak, pianist, composer and music teacher (d. 1882)
- October 15 – Alexander Dreyschock, pianist and composer (d. 1869)
- October 21 – James Whiting Vose, piano manufacturer who founded Vose & Sons (d. 1904)
- October 26 – Stefano Golinelli, pianist and composer (d. 1891)
- Kurmangazy Sagyrbaev, Kazakh folk musician and composer (d. 1889)

== Deaths ==
- February 1 – Giuseppe Gazzaniga, composer (b. 1743)
- March 20 – Johann Nikolaus Forkel, music theorist (b. 1749)
- March 28 – Antonio Capuzzi, violinist and composer (b. 1755)
- April 11 – Carl Andreas Göpfert, composer and musician (born 1768)
- May 7 – Leopold Kozeluch, composer (b. 1747)
- May 10 – Greta Naterberg, folk singer (b. 1772)
- May 18 – Maddalena Laura Sirmen, violinist, singer and composer (b. 1745)
- August 25 – Elizabeth Billington, opera singer (b. 1768)
- October 22 – Joachim Heinrich Campe, lyricist and writer (born 1746)
- December – Mikhail Kerzelli, pianist, violinist and composer (b. c. 1740)
- December 31 – Jean-Pierre Duport, cellist (b. 1741)
