= Georgina Schubert =

German coloratura soprano and lieder composer (1840–1878)

Georgina (or Georgine) Schubert (28 October 1840 – 26 December 1878) was a German coloratura soprano and lieder composer who toured throughout Europe.

== Life ==
Schubert was born in Dresden to violinist and composer François Schubert and his wife, soprano Maschinka Schubert. She was not related to the better-known composer Franz Schubert. Her maternal grandparents were also musicians: Kapellmeister Georg Abraham Schneider and his wife, Dresden Court Opera singer Caroline Portmann. Schubert's first teacher was her mother. She later studied with Jenny Lind and Manuel Garcia.

Schubert sang at major venues in England (Alexandra Palace and Grosvenor House). She appeared at the Lyric Theater in Paris, and at venues in the Netherlands and throughout Europe. She sang the role of Dinorah in Giacomo Meyerbeer's Le Pardon de Ploermel more than 30 times.

== Compositions ==
Schubert composed at least 12 lieder:

- "Ave Maria" (text by Anonymous)
- "Barcarole" (text by Carlo Pepoli)
- "Der Muschel gleichen meine Leider" (text by Karl Egon Ebert)
- "Der traumende See" (text by Julius Mosen)
- "Die Heimath" (text by Anonymous)
- "Gondoliera" (text by Pietro Antonio Domenico Bonaventura Trapassi as Pietro Metastasio)
- "Ich mocht' ein Lied dir singen" (text by H. Weisser)
- "L'ame d'un ange" (text by Theodore Faullin de Banville)
- "Romance" (text by Anonymous)
- "Romanza" (text by Raniero de' Calzabigi)
- "Serenade" (text by Anonymous)
- "Wiegenlied" (text by Melchior von Diepenbrock)
