= Zu Mantua in Banden =

Official anthem of Tyrol

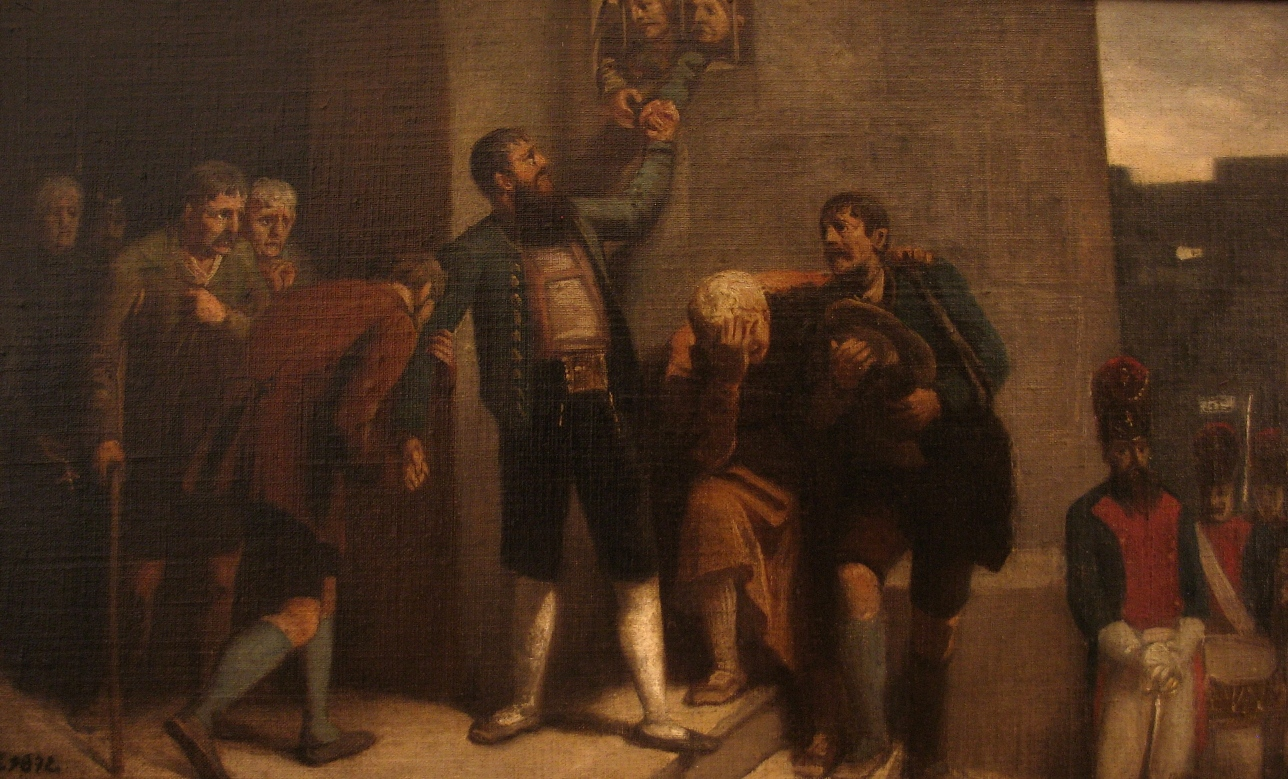
Hofer's last walk, Karl Karger, 1872

Zu Mantua in Banden (also known as the Andreas-Hofer-Lied) is one of the most popular folk songs and, since 1948, the official anthem of the current Austrian State of Tyrol, i.e. the Northern and Eastern part of the former County of Tyrol. The Landtag assembly of the Italian South Tyrol province on 29 October 2004 by majority has rejected its adoption about the Italian-speaking community. It is however, like the Bozner Bergsteigerlied, an unofficial anthem of the German-speaking community.

The lyrics were written by the German writer Julius Mosen in 1831, and the German composer Leopold Knebelsberger melodized them in 1844. The song deals with the death of Andreas Hofer, an innkeeper by trade, who was the leader of the Tyrolean Rebellion against the French and Bavarian occupation during the War of the Fifth Coalition in 1809. After Emperor Francis I of Austria had signed the Treaty of Schönbrunn, Hofer fought a losing battle. Betrayed and captured, he was executed by the personal command of Napoleon at Mantua in Italy on 20 February 1810 by the French forces.

The song originating from the Vormärz era became popular in the course of the veneration of Andreas Hofer as a protagonist of the Pan-German movement in the Austrian lands, especially aimed against Italian irredentism. Therefore, it has become subject to increasing criticism in recent years. Nevertheless, having official status as a regional anthem since 1948, it has been forbidden by law since 1972 with a fine of up to 2000 € possibly imposed, to sing parody versions of the song or to alter the lyrics otherwise in a way that might be insulting to the Tyrolean population. Originally, it was generally forbidden to sing different lyrics to the anthem's melody. However, a popular socialist song, Dem Morgenrot entgegen, is written to the melody of the Tyrolean anthem. Dem Morgenrot entgegen was sung at an event hosted by the SPÖ in 2004, which resulted in a legal complaint by the Tyrolean governor. The current legal situation was then established after an objection by the SPÖ at the Austrian Constitutional Court, which said the court has affirmed.

== Lyrics ==
The English lyrics are roughly translated.

Zu Mantua in Banden
Der treue Hofer war,
In Mantua zum Tode
Führt ihn der Feinde Schar.
Es blutete der Brüder Herz,
Ganz Deutschland, ach, in Schmach und Schmerz.
Mit ihm das Land Tirol,
Mit ihm das Land Tirol.

Die Hände auf dem Rücken
Der Sandwirt Hofer ging,
Mit ruhig festen Schritten,
Ihm schien der Tod gering.
Den Tod, den er so manchesmal,
Vom Iselberg geschickt ins Tal,
Im heil'gen Land Tirol,
Im heil'gen Land Tirol.

Doch als aus Kerkergittern
Im festen Mantua
Die treuen Waffenbrüder
Die Händ' er strecken sah,
Da rief er laut: "Gott sei mit euch,
Mit dem verrat'nen deutschen Reich,
Und mit dem Land Tirol,
Und mit dem Land Tirol."

Dem Tambour will der Wirbel
Nicht unterm Schlegel vor,
Als nun der Sandwirt Hofer
Schritt durch das finst're Tor,
Der Sandwirt, noch in Banden frei,
Dort stand er fest auf der Bastei.
Der Mann vom Land Tirol,
Der Mann vom Land Tirol.

Dort soll er niederknie'n,
Er sprach: "Das tu ich nit!
Will sterben, wie ich stehe,
Will sterben, wie ich stritt!
So wie ich steh' auf dieser Schanz',
Es leb' mein guter Kaiser Franz,
Mit ihm sein Land Tirol!
Mit ihm sein Land Tirol!"

Und von der Hand die Binde
Nimmt ihm der Korporal;
Und Sandwirt Hofer betet
Allhier zum letzten Mal;
Dann ruft er: "Nun, so trefft mich recht!
Gebt Feuer! Ach, wie schießt ihr schlecht!
Ade, mein Land Tirol!
Ade, mein Land Tirol!"

At Mantua bound
the loyal Hofer was.
At Mantua into death
his enemies him led.
With bleeding hearts his brothers were,
all of Germany was dishonoured and in pain
and with it its land Tyrol,
and with it its land Tyrol.

His hands on his back
the innkeeper Hofer strode
with calm and firm steps
death meant little to him.
Death, which he had himself sent sometimes
from Iselberg into the valley,
in the holy Land Tyrol,
in the holy land Tyrol.

But when, from the dungeon's bars
in fortified Mantua,
his brothers in arms' hands
outstretched he saw,
he loudly shouted: God be with you
and with the betrayed German Reich
and with the land Tyrol,
and with the land Tyrol.

The reel, it hardly wants to sound
from the stick of the drum,
when then innkeeper Hofer
strode out the dark dungeon's gate.
The innkeeper, though bound, is still free,
stood firmly upon the bastion's walls.
The man from the land Tyrol,
the man from the land Tyrol

When told to bend down on his knees,
he says: "I'll never do such a thing!
Want to die as I stand here
to die standing, as I fought!
As I stand here upon this mound,
long live my dearest Kaiser Franz
as should his land Tyrol,
as should his land Tyrol!

And from his arm the armband
takes off the corporal;
and the innkeeper prays
here for one last time;
then he shouts out loud: "Now hit me right,
fire well! oh dear, are you shooting poorly!"
Farewell, my land Tyrol,
farewell, my land Tyrol
