= Franz Schubert (violinist) =

German violinist and composer (1808–1878)

(Xaver) Franz Schubert (22 July 1808, Dresden – 12 April 1878, Dresden) was a violinist and composer.

After training with concertmaster Antonio Rolla in Dresden, Schubert studied violin with Charles Philippe Lafont in Paris and began working under the name François Schubert. He played in the Staatskapelle in Dresden beginning in 1823, where he became vice-concertmaster in 1838 and was concertmaster from 1847 to 1873.

The son of church composer Franz Anton Schubert (the Elder, 1768–1824), Schubert was married to the singer and actress Maschinka Schubert (1815–1882) who was the daughter of horn player and composer Georg Abraham Schneider. Their daughter was the opera singer and composer Georgina Schubert (1840–1878).

Franz Schubert composed concert pieces, études, and chamber music, but is largely known for the bagatelle The Bee, a perpetuum mobile for violin and piano – a piece that is often misattributed to Franz Schubert due to the similarity of the two men's names.

== Selected works ==
The Bee, Op. 13, No. 9
Performed by the Advent Chamber Orchestra

- 9 Études for violin solo, Op. 3
- Divertissement sur des motifs de l'opéra Lestocq d'Auber in D major for violin and piano, Op. 4 (1836)
- Souvenir de Norma, Variations in G major for violin and piano, Op. 5 (1837)
- 2 Nocturnes for violin and piano, Op. 7 (1844)
  1. Amour secret in B major
  2. La Sérénade in B♭ major
- Duo concertant sur des motifs de l'opéra Rienzi par Richard Wagner for violin and piano, Op. 8 (1845)
- Alpenrosen, Solo über Tyroler National-Lieder in E major for violin and piano (1853)
- La Napolitana, Solo sur des thèmes napolitains in A minor for violin and piano (or string quartet), Op. 12 (1853)
- Bagatelles, 12 Morceaux detachés for violin and piano, Op. 13 (published 1856–1862)
  1. Impromptu (1856)
  2. Cantabile (1856)
  3. Allegretto grazioso in A major (1856)
  4. Allegretto agitato in D minor (1857)
  5. Andantino in A♭ major (1857)
  6. Romanza espressiva (1857)
  7. Le Papillon (1859)
  8. Le Désir in G major (1859)
  9. L'Abeille (The Bee; Die Biene) in E minor (1860)
  10. Tyrolienne in E major (1862)
  11. Chant plaintif (1862)
  12. Barcarola in G minor (1862)
- Rêverie, Morceau de salon in G major for violin and piano, Op. 14
