= String instrument =

Class of musical instruments with vibrating strings

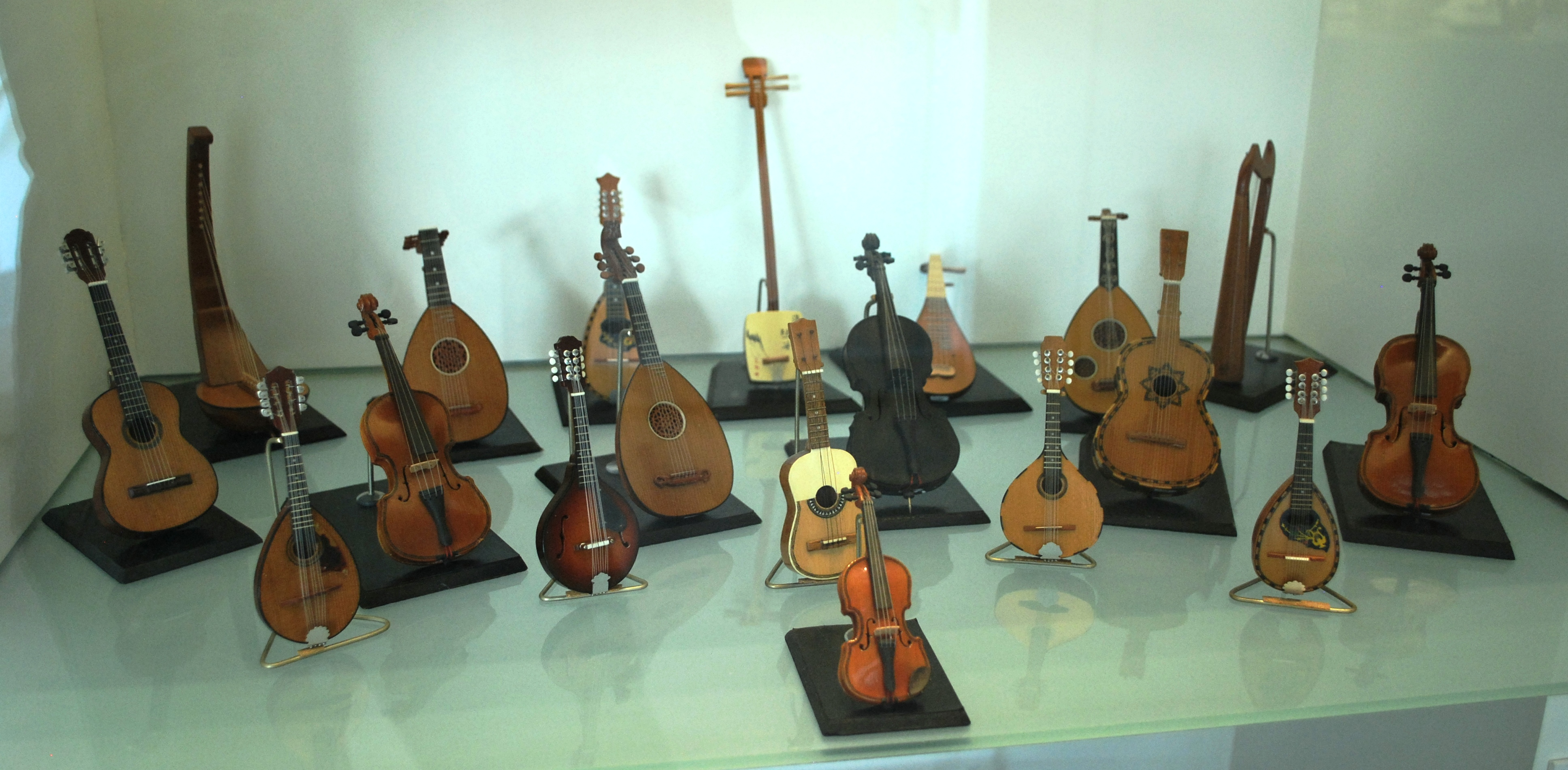
Various string instruments; mostly lute family instruments

In musical instrument classification, string instruments, or chordophones, are musical instruments that produce sound from vibrating strings when a performer strums, plucks, strikes or sounds the strings in varying manners.

Musicians play some string instruments, like guitars, by plucking the strings with their fingers or a plectrum (pick), and others by hitting the strings with a light wooden hammer or by rubbing the strings with a bow, like violins. In some keyboard instruments, such as the harpsichord, the musician presses a key that plucks the string. Other musical instruments generate sound by striking the string.

With bowed instruments, the player pulls a rosined horsehair bow across the strings, causing them to vibrate. With a hurdy-gurdy, the musician cranks a wheel whose rosined edge touches the strings.

Bowed instruments include the string section instruments of the orchestra in Western classical music (violin, viola, cello and double bass) and a number of other instruments (e.g., viols and gambas used in early music from the Baroque music era and fiddles used in many types of folk music). All of the bowed string instruments can also be plucked with the fingers, a technique called "pizzicato". A wide variety of techniques are used to sound notes on the electric guitar, including plucking with the fingernails or a plectrum, strumming and even "tapping" on the fingerboard and using feedback from a loud, distorted guitar amplifier to produce a sustained sound.

Some string instruments are mainly plucked, such as the harp and the electric bass. Other examples include the sitar, rebab, banjo, mandolin, ukulele, and bouzouki.

In the Hornbostel–Sachs scheme of musical instrument classification, used in organology, string instruments are called chordophones. According to Sachs,

Chordophones are instruments with strings. The strings may be struck with sticks, plucked with the bare fingers or a plectrum, bowed or (in the Aeolian harp, for instance) sounded by wind. The confusing plenitude of stringed instruments can be reduced to four fundamental type: zithers, lutes, lyres, and harps.

In most string instruments, the vibrations are transmitted to the body of the instrument, which often incorporates some sort of hollow or enclosed area. The body of the instrument also vibrates, along with the air inside it. The vibration of the body of the instrument and the enclosed hollow or chamber make the vibration of the string more audible to the performer and audience. The body of most string instruments is hollow, in order to have better sound projection. Some, however—such as electric guitar and other instruments that rely on electronic amplification—may have a solid wood body.

== Classification ==
In musicology, string instruments are known as chordophones. It is one of the five main divisions of instruments in the Hornbostel–Sachs scheme of musical instrument classification.

Hornbostel–Sachs divides chordophones into two main groups: instruments without a resonator as an integral part of the instrument (which have the classification number 31, also known as 'simple'); and instruments with such a resonator (which have the classification number 32, also known as 'composite'). Most western instruments fall into the second group, but the piano and harpsichord fall into the first. Hornbostel and Sachs's criterion for determining which sub-group an instrument falls into is that if the resonator can be removed without destroying the instrument, then it is classified as 31. The idea that the piano's casing, which acts as a resonator, could be removed without destroying the instrument, may seem odd, but if the action and strings of the piano were taken out of its box, it could still be played. This is not true of the violin, because the string passes over a bridge located on the resonator box, so removing the resonator would mean the strings had no tension.

Curt Sachs also broke chordophones into four basic subcategories, "zithers, lutes, lyres and harps."

- Zithers include stick zithers such as the musical bow, tube zithers with a tube as the resonator such as the valiha, raft zithers in which tube zithers are tied into a single "raft", board zithers including clavichord and piano and dulcimer, and long zithers (described as combination of half-tube and board zithers) including Se and Guzheng families.
- Lutes are stringed musical instruments that include a body and "a neck which serves both as a handle and as a means of stretching the strings beyond the body." The lute family includes not only short-necked plucked lutes such as the lute, oud, pipa, guitar, citole, gittern, mandore, rubab, and gambus and long-necked plucked lutes such as the tanbura, swarabat, bağlama, bouzouki, veena, theorbo, archlute, pandura, sitar, setar, but also bowed instruments such as the Yaylı tambur, rebab, erhu, and entire family of viols and violins.
- The lyre has two arms, which have a "yoke" or crossbar connecting them, and strings between the crossbar and the soundboard. Sachs divided this into the box lyre such as the Greek kithara and the bowl lyre which used a bowl on its side with skin soundboard.
- The harp which has strings vertical to the soundboard.

== Earliest string instruments ==
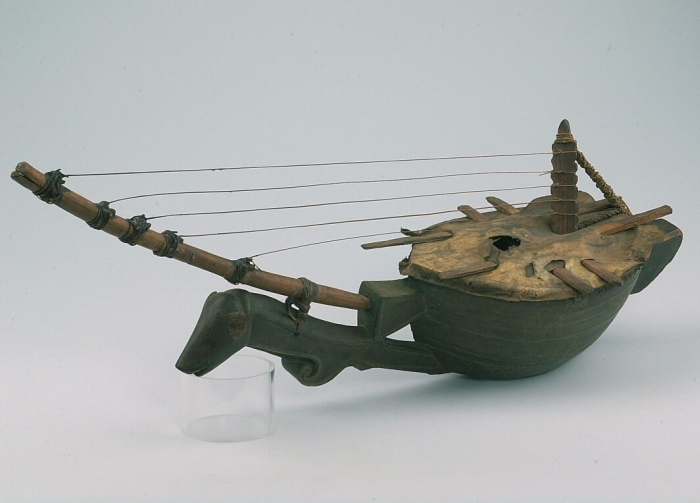
Bow Harp or Harp Lute, West Africa

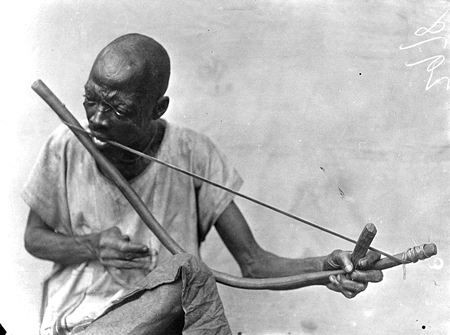
Musical bows have survived in some parts of Africa.

Dating to around c. 13,000 BC, a cave painting in the Trois Frères cave in France depicts what some believe is a musical bow, a hunting bow used as a single-stringed musical instrument. From the musical bow, families of stringed instruments developed; since each string played a single note, adding strings added new notes, creating bow harps, harps and lyres. In turn, this led to being able to play dyads and chords. Another innovation occurred when the bow harp was straightened out and a bridge used to lift the strings off the stick-neck, creating the lute.

This picture of musical bow to harp bow is theory and has been contested. In 1965 Franz Jahnel wrote his criticism stating that the early ancestors of plucked instruments are not currently known. He felt that the harp bow was a long cry from the sophistication of the civilizations of western Asia in 4000 BC that took the primitive technology and created "technically and artistically well-made harps, lyres, citharas, and lutes."

Archaeological digs have identified some of the earliest stringed instruments in Ancient Mesopotamian sites, like the lyres of Ur, which include artifacts over three thousand years old. The development of lyre instruments required the technology to create a tuning mechanism to tighten and loosen the string tension. Lyres with wooden bodies and strings used for plucking or playing with a bow represent key instruments that point towards later harps and violin-type instruments; moreover, Indian instruments from 500 BC have been discovered with anything from 7 to 21 strings. In Vietnam, a 2,000 year old, singularly stringed instrument made of deer antler was also discovered.

== Lutes ==
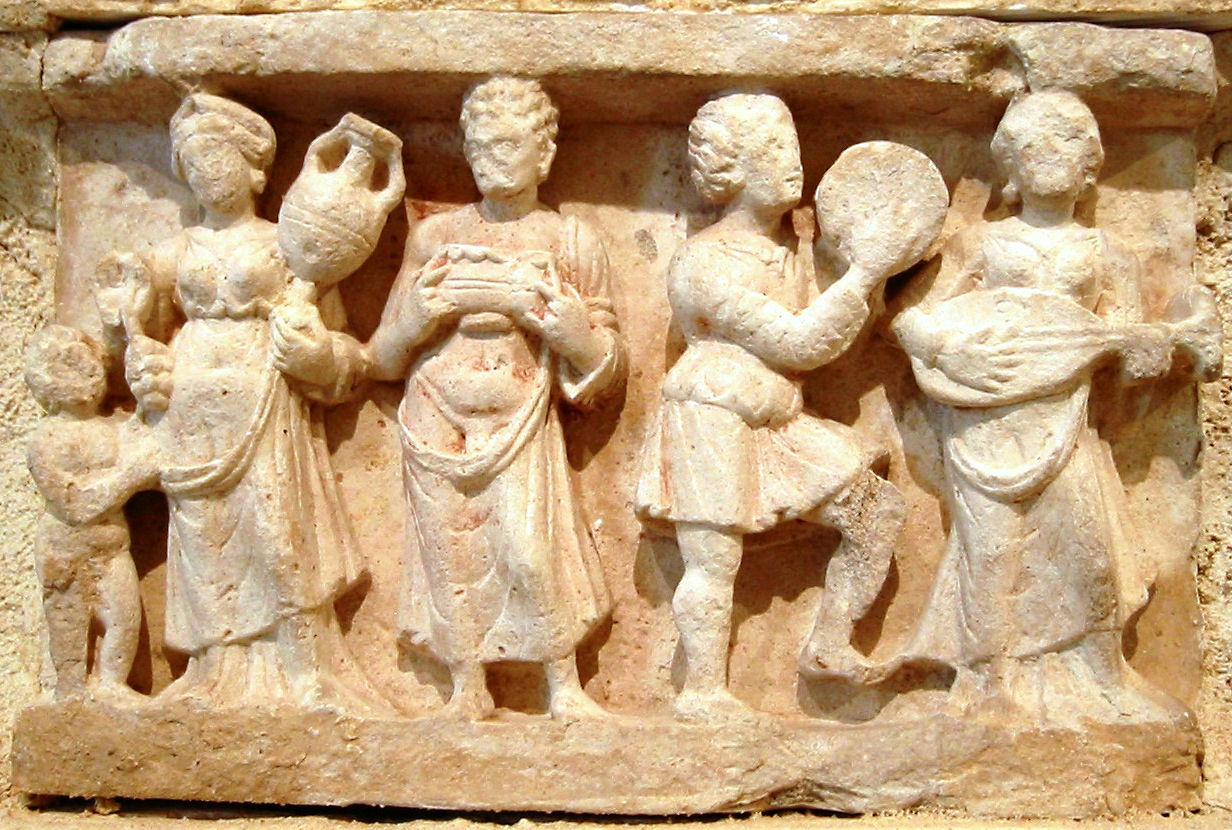
Hellenistic banquet scene from the 1st century AD, Hadda, Gandhara. Lute player far right.

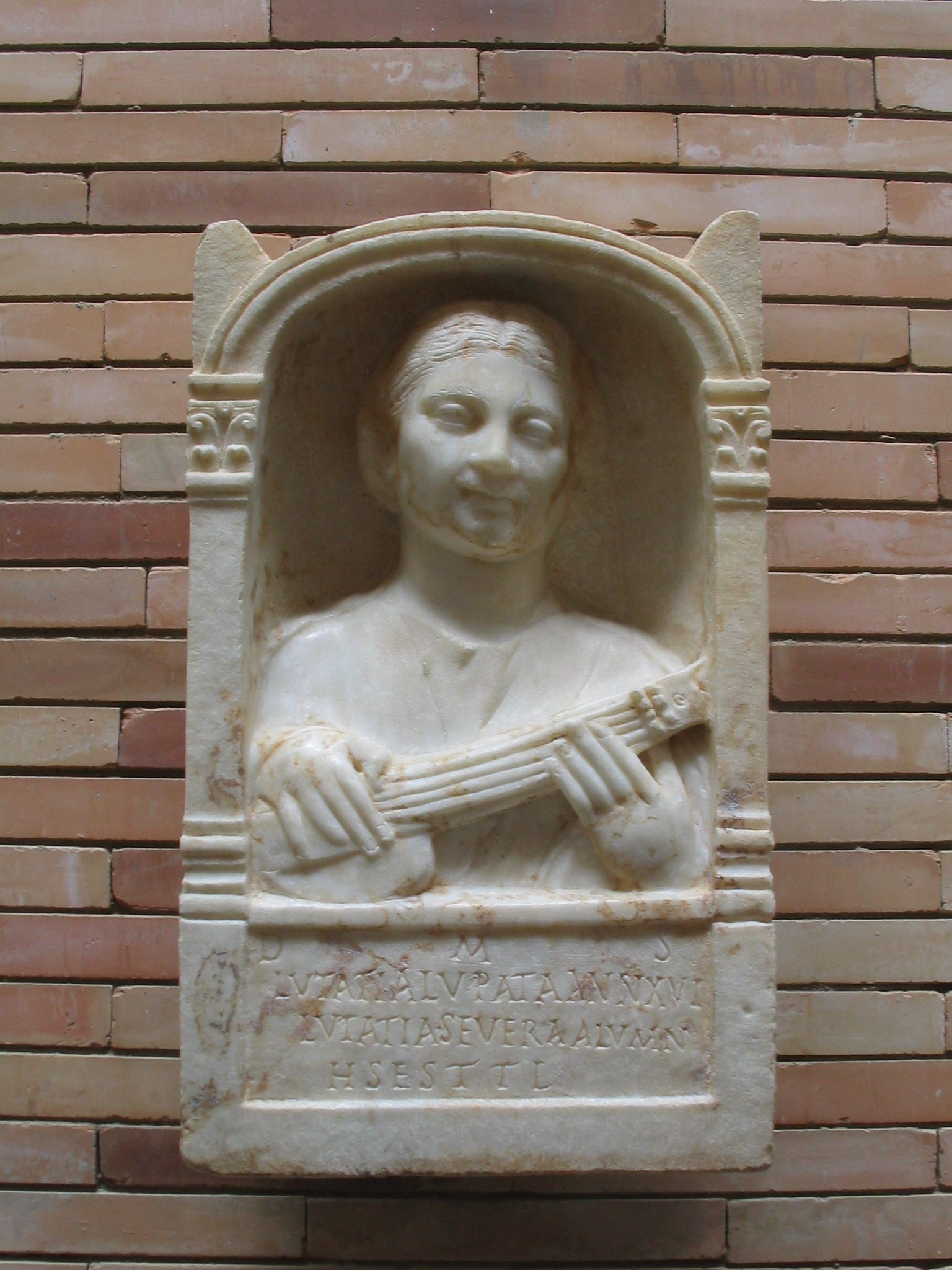
Spanish stele of a boy with a pandura.

Musicologists have put forth examples of that 4th-century BC technology, looking at engraved images that have survived. The earliest image showing a lute-like instrument came from Mesopotamia prior to 3000 BC. A cylinder seal from c. 3100 BC or earlier (now in the possession of the British Museum) shows what is thought to be a woman playing a stick lute. From the surviving images, theorists have categorized the Mesopotamian lutes, showing that they developed into a long variety and a short. The line of long lutes may have developed into the tamburs and pandura. The line of short lutes was further developed to the east of Mesopotamia, in Bactria, Gandhara, and Northwest India, and shown in sculpture from the 2nd century BC through the 4th or 5th centuries AD.

During the medieval era, instrument development varied in different regions of the world. Middle Eastern rebecs represented breakthroughs in terms of shape and strings, with a half a pear shape using three strings. Early versions of the violin and fiddle, by comparison, emerged in Europe through instruments such as the gittern, a four-stringed precursor to the guitar, and basic lutes. These instruments typically used catgut (animal intestine) and other materials, including silk, for their strings.

== Renaissance to modern ==
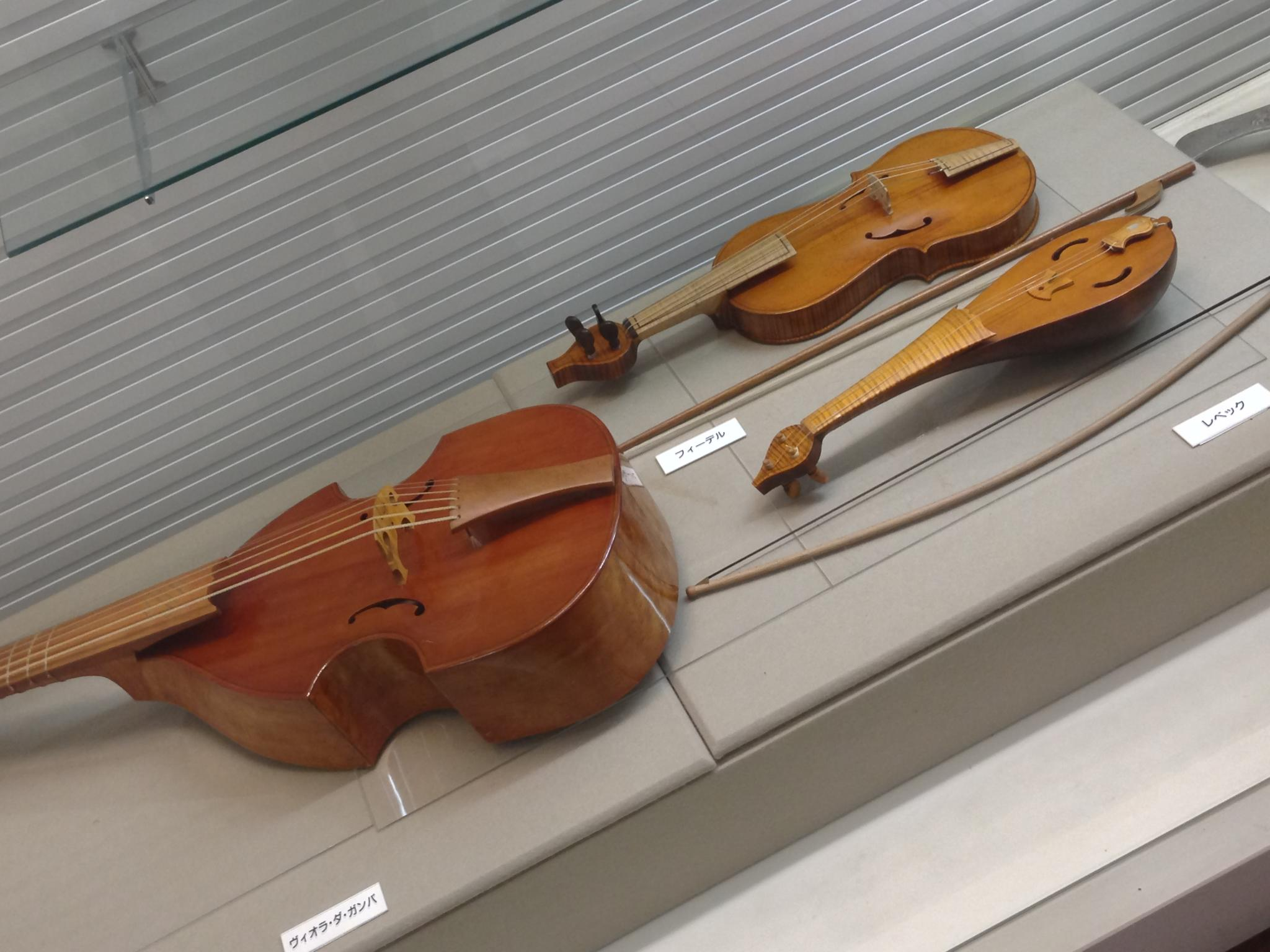
Viol, fidel and rebec (from left to right) on display at Amakusa Korejiyokan in Amakusa, Kumamoto, Japan

String instrument design was refined during the Renaissance and into the Baroque period (1600–1750) of musical history. Violins and guitars became more consistent in design and were roughly similar to acoustic guitars of the 2000s. The violins of the Renaissance featured intricate woodwork and stringing, while more elaborate bass instruments such as the bandora were produced alongside quill-plucked citterns, and Spanish body guitars.

In the 19th century, string instruments were made more widely available through mass production, with wood string instruments a key part of orchestras – cellos, violas, and upright basses, for example, were now standard instruments for chamber ensembles and smaller orchestras. At the same time, the 19th-century guitar became more typically associated with six-string models, rather than traditional five-string versions.

Major changes to string instruments in the 20th century primarily involved innovations in electronic instrument amplification and electronic music – electric violins were available by the 1920s and were an important part of emerging jazz music trends in the United States. The acoustic guitar was widely used in blues and jazz, but as an acoustic instrument, it was not loud enough to be a solo instrument, so these genres mostly used it as an accompaniment rhythm section instrument. In big bands of the 1920s, the acoustic guitar played backing chords, but it was not loud enough to play solos like the saxophone and trumpet. The development of guitar amplifiers, which contained a power amplifier and a loudspeaker in a wooden cabinet, let jazz guitarists play solos and be heard over a big band. The development of the electric guitar provided guitarists with an instrument that was built to connect to guitar amplifiers. Electric guitars have magnetic pickups, volume control knobs and an output jack.

In the 1960s, larger, more powerful guitar amplifiers were developed, called "stacks". These powerful amplifiers enabled guitarists to perform in rock bands that played in large venues such as stadiums and outdoor music festivals (e.g., Woodstock Music Festival). Along with the development of guitar amplifiers, a large range of electronic effects units, many in small stompbox pedals, were introduced in the 1960s and 1970s, such as fuzz pedals, flangers, and phasers, enabling performers to create unique new sounds during the psychedelic rock era. Breakthroughs in electric guitar and bass technologies and playing styles enabled major breakthroughs in pop and rock music in the 1960s and 1970s. The distinctive sound of the amplified electric guitar was the centerpiece of new genres of music such as blues rock and jazz-rock fusion. The sonic power of the loudly amplified, highly distorted electric guitar was the key element of the early heavy metal music, with the distorted guitar being used in lead guitar roles, and with power chords as a rhythm guitar.

The ongoing use of electronic amplification and effects units in string instruments, ranging from traditional instruments like the violin to the new electric guitar, added variety to contemporary classical music performances, and enabled experimentation in the dynamic and timbre (tone colour) range of orchestras, bands, and solo performances.

== Types of instruments ==
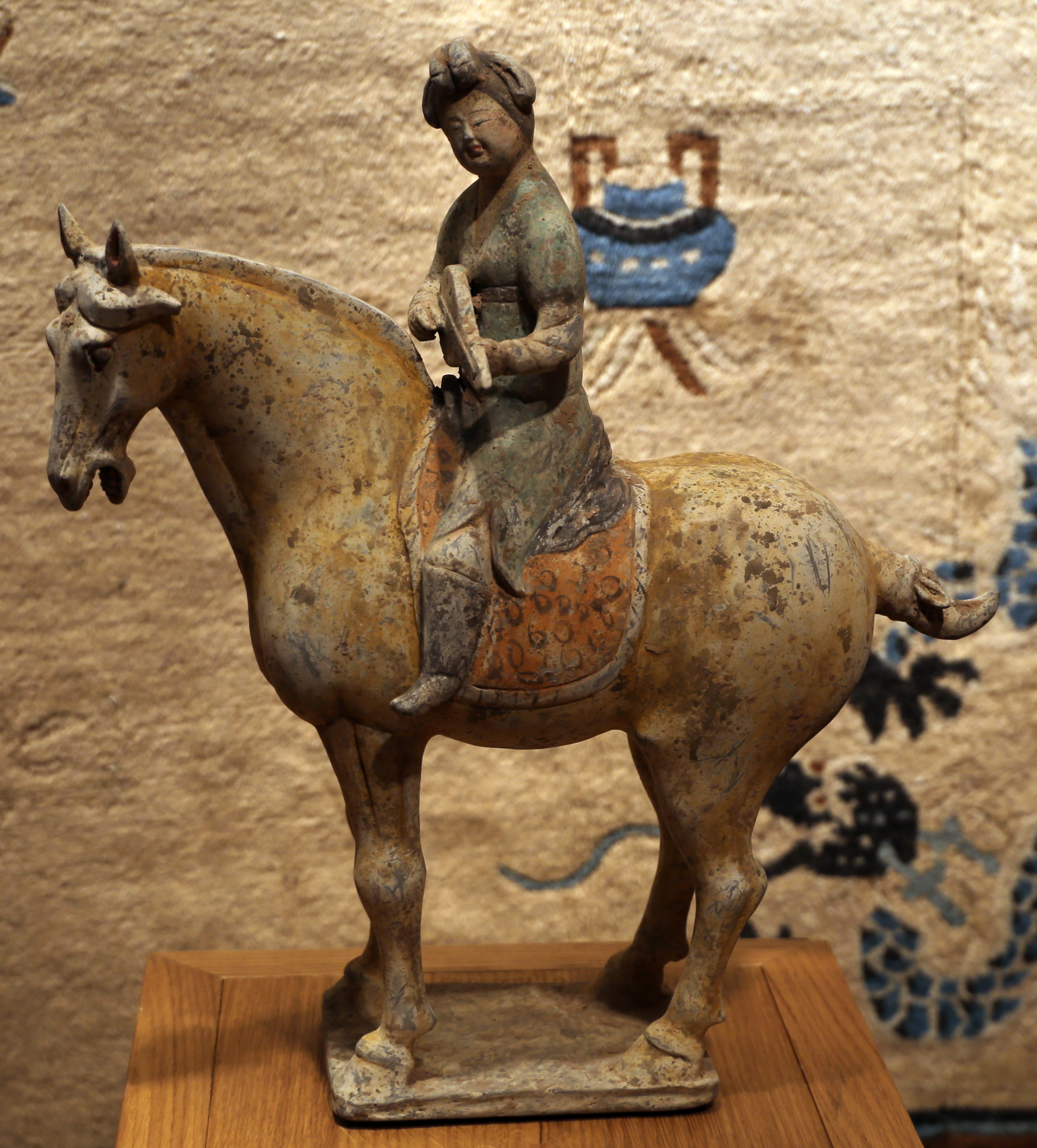
A woman playing some kind of string instrument while riding a horse, Tang dynasty

=== Construction ===
String instruments can be divided into three groups:

Lutes
Instruments that support the strings via a neck and a bout (gourd), for instance a guitar, violin, or saz
Harps
Instruments that contain the strings within a frame
Zithers
Instruments that have the strings mounted on a body, frame or tube, such as a guqin, cimbalom, autoharp, harpsichord, piano, or valiha

It is also possible to divide the instruments into categories focused on how the instrument is played.

=== Playing techniques ===
All string instruments produce sound from one or more vibrating strings, transferred to the air by the body of the instrument (or by a pickup in electronically amplified instruments). They are usually categorised by the technique used to make the strings vibrate (or by the primary technique, in the case of instruments where more than one may apply). The three most common techniques are plucking, bowing, and striking. An important difference between bowing and plucking is that in the former the phenomenon is periodic so that the overtones are kept in a strictly harmonic relationship to the fundamental.

==== Plucking ====
Plucking is a method of playing on instruments such as the veena, banjo, ukulele, guitar, harp, lute, mandolin, oud, and sitar, using either a finger, thumb, or quills (now plastic plectra) to pluck the strings.

Instruments normally played by bowing (see below) may also be plucked, a technique referred to by the Italian term pizzicato.

==== Bowing ====
Bowing (Italian: arco) is a method used in some string instruments, including the violin, viola, cello, and the double bass (of the violin family), and the old viol family. The bow consists of a stick with a "ribbon" of parallel horse tail hairs stretched between its ends. The hair is coated with rosin so it can grip the string; moving the hair across a string causes a stick-slip phenomenon, making the string vibrate, and prompting the instrument to emit sound. Darker grades of rosin grip well in cool, dry climates, but may be too sticky in warmer, more humid weather. Violin and viola players generally use harder, lighter-colored rosin than players of lower-pitched instruments, who tend to favor darker, softer rosin.

The ravanahatha is one of the oldest string instruments. Ancestors of the modern bowed string instruments are the rebab of the Islamic Empires, the Persian kamanche and the Byzantine lira. Other bowed instruments are the rebec, hardingfele, nyckelharpa, kokyū, erhu, igil, sarangi, morin khuur, and K'ni. The hurdy-gurdy is bowed by a wheel. Rarely, the guitar has been played with a bow (rather than plucked) for unique effects.

==== Striking ====
The third common method of sound production in stringed instruments is to strike the string. The piano and hammered dulcimer use this method of sound production. Even though the piano strikes the strings, the use of felt hammers means that the sound that is produced can nevertheless be mellow and rounded, in contrast to the sharp attack produced when a very hard hammer strikes the strings.

Violin family string instrument players are occasionally instructed to strike the string with the stick of the bow, a technique called col legno. This yields a percussive sound along with the pitch of the note. A well-known use of col legno for orchestral strings is Gustav Holst's "Mars" movement from The Planets suite.

==== Other methods ====
The aeolian harp employs a very unusual method of sound production: the strings are excited by the movement of the air.

Some instruments that have strings have an attached keyboard that the player presses keys on to trigger a mechanism that sounds the strings, instead of directly manipulating the strings. These include the piano, the clavichord, and the harpsichord. With these keyboard instruments, strings are occasionally plucked or bowed by hand. Modern composers such as Henry Cowell wrote music that requires that the player reach inside the piano and pluck the strings directly, "bow" them with bow hair wrapped around the strings, or play them by rolling the bell of a brass instrument such as a trombone on the array of strings. However, these are relatively rarely used special techniques.

Other keyed string instruments, small enough for a strolling musician to play, include the plucked autoharp, the bowed nyckelharpa, and the hurdy-gurdy, which is played by cranking a rosined wheel.

Steel-stringed instruments (such as the guitar, bass, violin, etc.) can be played using a magnetic field. An E-Bow is a small hand-held battery-powered device that magnetically excites the strings of an electric string instrument to provide a sustained, singing tone reminiscent of a held bowed violin note.

Third bridge is a plucking method where the player frets a string and strikes the side opposite the bridge. The technique is mainly used on electric instruments because these have a pickup that amplifies only the local string vibration. It is possible on acoustic instruments as well, but less effective. For instance, a player might press on the seventh fret on a guitar and pluck it at the head side to make a tone resonate at the opposing side. On electric instruments, this technique generates multitone sounds reminiscent of a clock or bell.

Electric string instruments, such as the electric guitar, can also be played without touching the strings by using audio feedback. When an electric guitar is plugged into a loud, powerful guitar amplifier with a loudspeaker and a high level of distortion is intentionally used, the guitar produces sustained high-pitched sounds. By changing the proximity of the guitar to the speaker, the guitarist can produce sounds that cannot be produced with standard plucking and picking techniques. This technique was popularized by Jimi Hendrix and others in the 1960s. It was widely used in psychedelic rock and heavy metal music.

== Changing the pitch of a vibrating string ==
There are three ways to change the pitch of a vibrating string. String instruments are tuned by varying a string's tension because adjusting length or mass per unit length is impractical. Instruments with a fingerboard are then played by adjusting the length of the vibrating portion of the strings. The following observations all apply to a string that is infinitely flexible (a theoretical assumption, because in practical applications, strings are not infinitely flexible) strung between two fixed supports. Real strings have finite curvature at the bridge and nut, and the bridge, because of its motion, is not exactly nodes of vibration. Hence the following statements about proportionality are approximations.

=== Length ===
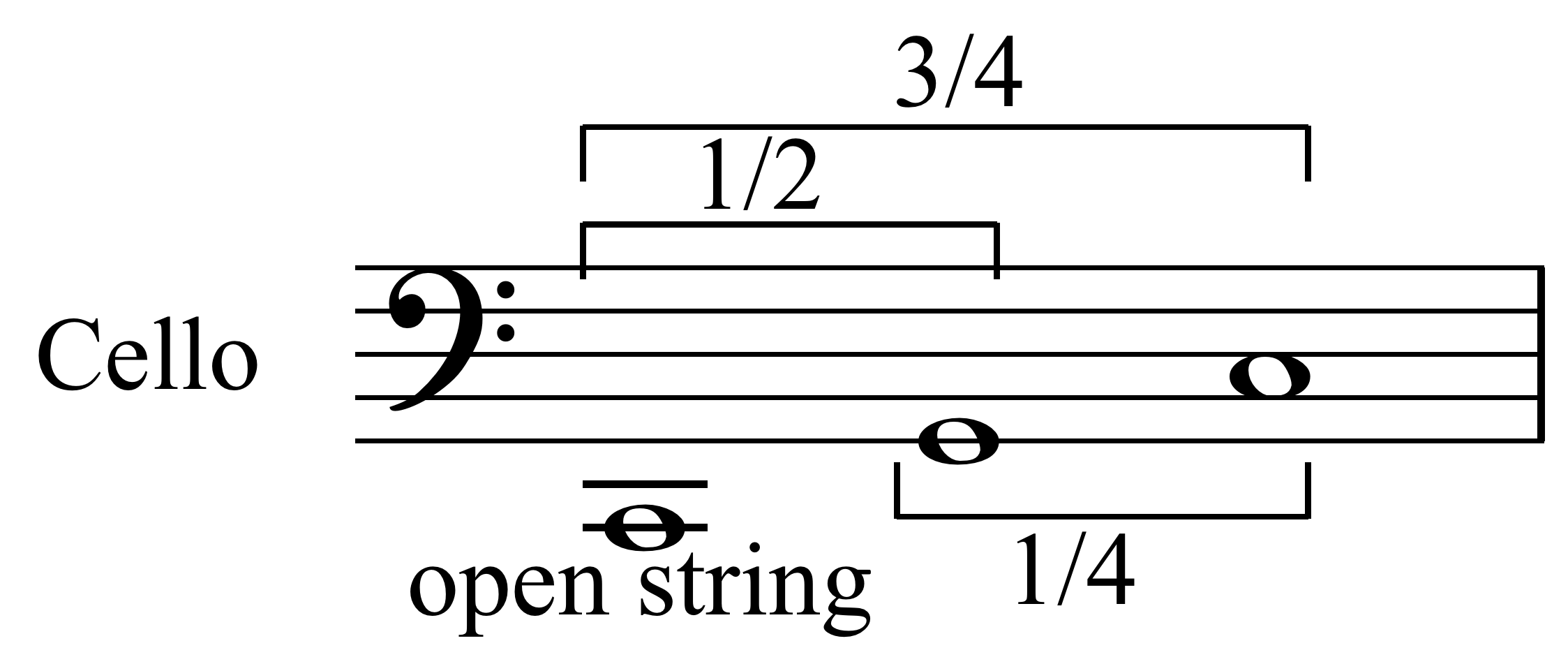
String fingering is proportional and not fixed, as on the piano

Pitch can be adjusted by varying the length of the string. A longer string results in a lower pitch, while a shorter string results in a higher pitch. A concert harp has pedals that cause a hard object to make contact with a string to shorten its vibrating length during a performance. The frequency is inversely proportional to the length:

$$f \propto \frac{1}{l}$$

A string twice as long produces a tone of half the frequency (one octave lower).

=== Tension ===
Pitch can be adjusted by varying the tension of the string. A string with less tension (looser) results in a lower pitch, while a string with greater tension (tighter) results in a higher pitch. Pushing a pedal on a pedal steel guitar raises the pitch of certain strings by increasing tension on them (stretching) through a mechanical linkage; release of the pedal returns the pitch to the original. Knee levers on the instrument can lower a pitch by releasing (and restoring) tension in the same way. A homemade washtub bass made out of a length of rope, a broomstick and a washtub can produce different pitches by increasing the tension on the rope (producing a higher pitch) or reducing the tension (producing a lower pitch). The frequency is proportional to the square root of the tension:

$$f \propto \sqrt{T}$$

=== Linear density ===
The pitch of a string can also be varied by changing the linear density (mass per unit length) of the string. In practical applications, such as with double bass strings or bass piano strings, extra weight is added to strings by winding them with metal. A string with a heavier metal winding produces a lower pitch than a string of equal length without a metal winding. This can be seen on a 2016-era set of gut strings for double bass. The higher-pitched G string is often made of synthetic material, or sometimes animal intestine, with no metal wrapping. To enable the low E string to produce a much lower pitch with a string of the same length, it is wrapped with many wrappings of thin metal wire. This adds to its mass without making it too stiff. The frequency is inversely proportional to the square root of the linear density:

$$f \propto {1 \over \sqrt{\mu}}$$

Given two strings of equal length and tension, the string with higher mass per unit length produces the lower pitch.

== String length or scale length ==
The length of the string from nut to bridge on bowed or plucked instruments ultimately determines the distance between different notes on the instrument. For example, a double bass with its low range needs a scale length of around 42 inches (110 cm), whilst a violin scale is only about 13 inches (33 cm). On the shorter scale of the violin, the left hand may easily reach a range of slightly more than two octaves without shifting position, while on the bass' longer scale, a single octave or a ninth is reachable in lower positions.

== Contact points along the string ==
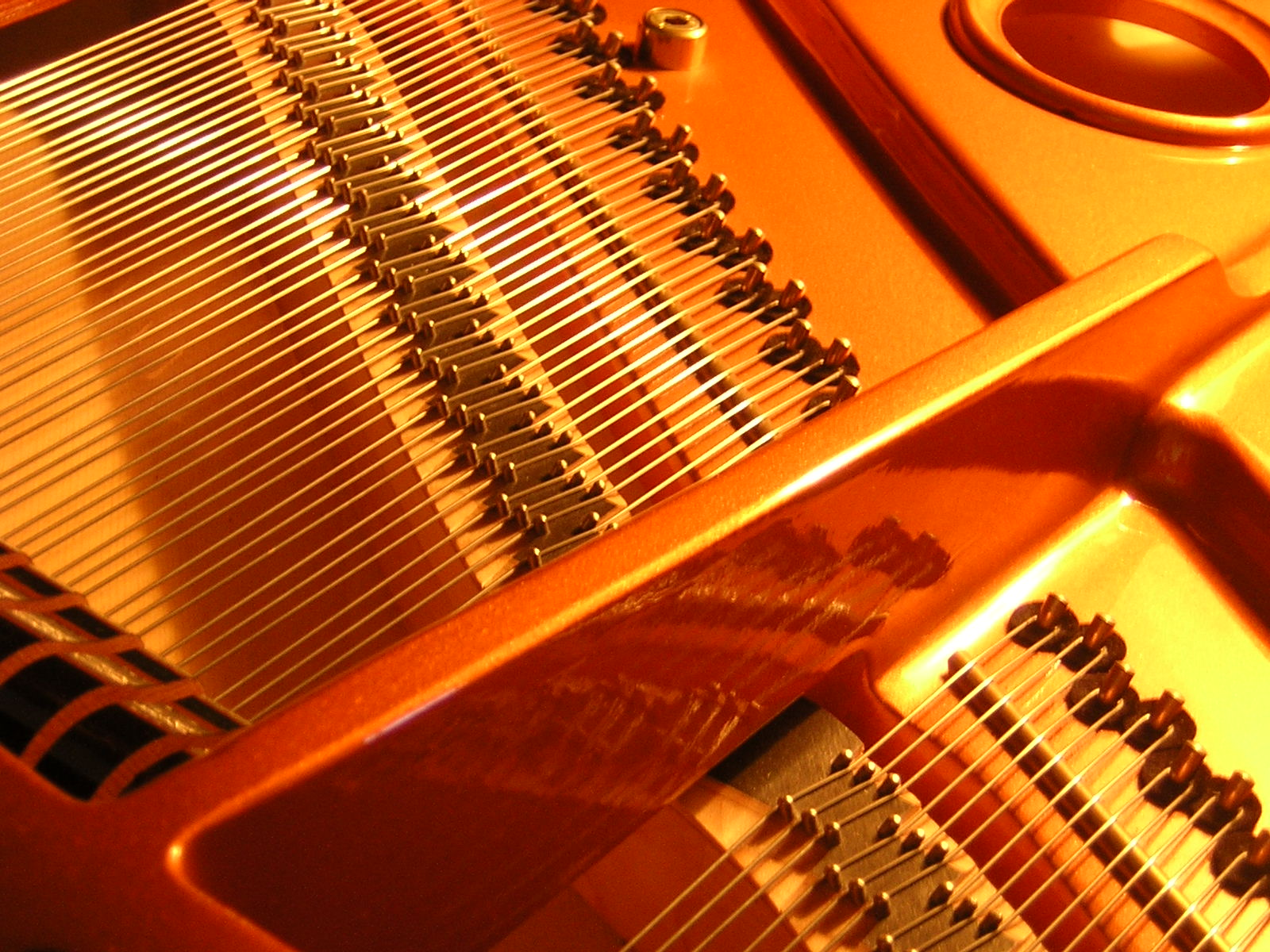
The strings of a piano

In bowed instruments, the bow is normally placed perpendicularly to the string, at a point halfway between the end of the fingerboard and the bridge. However, different bow placements can be selected to change timbre. Application of the bow close to the bridge (known as sul ponticello) produces an intense, sometimes harsh sound, which acoustically emphasizes the upper harmonics. Bowing above the fingerboard (sul tasto) produces a purer tone with less overtone strength, emphasizing the fundamental, also known as flautando, since it sounds less reedy and more flute-like.

Bowed instruments pose a challenge to instrument builders, as compared with instruments that are only plucked (e.g., guitar), because on bowed instruments, the musician must be able to play one string at a time if they wish. As such, a bowed instrument must have a curved bridge that makes the "outer" strings lower in height than the "inner" strings. With such a curved bridge, the player can select one string at a time to play. On guitars and lutes, the bridge can be flat, because the strings are played by plucking them with the fingers, fingernails or a pick; by moving the fingers or pick to different positions, the player can play different strings. On bowed instruments, the need to play strings individually with the bow also limits the number of strings to about six or seven; with more strings, it would be impossible to select individual strings to bow. (Bowed strings can also play two bowed notes on two different strings at the same time, a technique called a double stop.) Indeed, on the orchestral string section instruments, four strings are the norm, with the exception of five strings used on some double basses. In contrast, with stringed keyboard instruments, 88 courses are used on a piano, and even though these strings are arranged on a flat bridge, the mechanism can play any of the notes individually.

Similar timbral distinctions are also possible with plucked string instruments by selecting an appropriate plucking point, although the difference is perhaps more subtle.

In keyboard instruments, the contact point along the string (whether this be hammer, tangent, or plectrum) is a choice made by the instrument designer. Builders use a combination of experience and acoustic theory to establish the right set of contact points.

In harpsichords, often there are two sets of strings of equal length. These "choirs" usually differ in their plucking points. One choir has a "normal" plucking point, producing a canonical harpsichord sound; the other has a plucking point close to the bridge, producing a reedier "nasal" sound rich in upper harmonics.

== Production of multiple notes ==
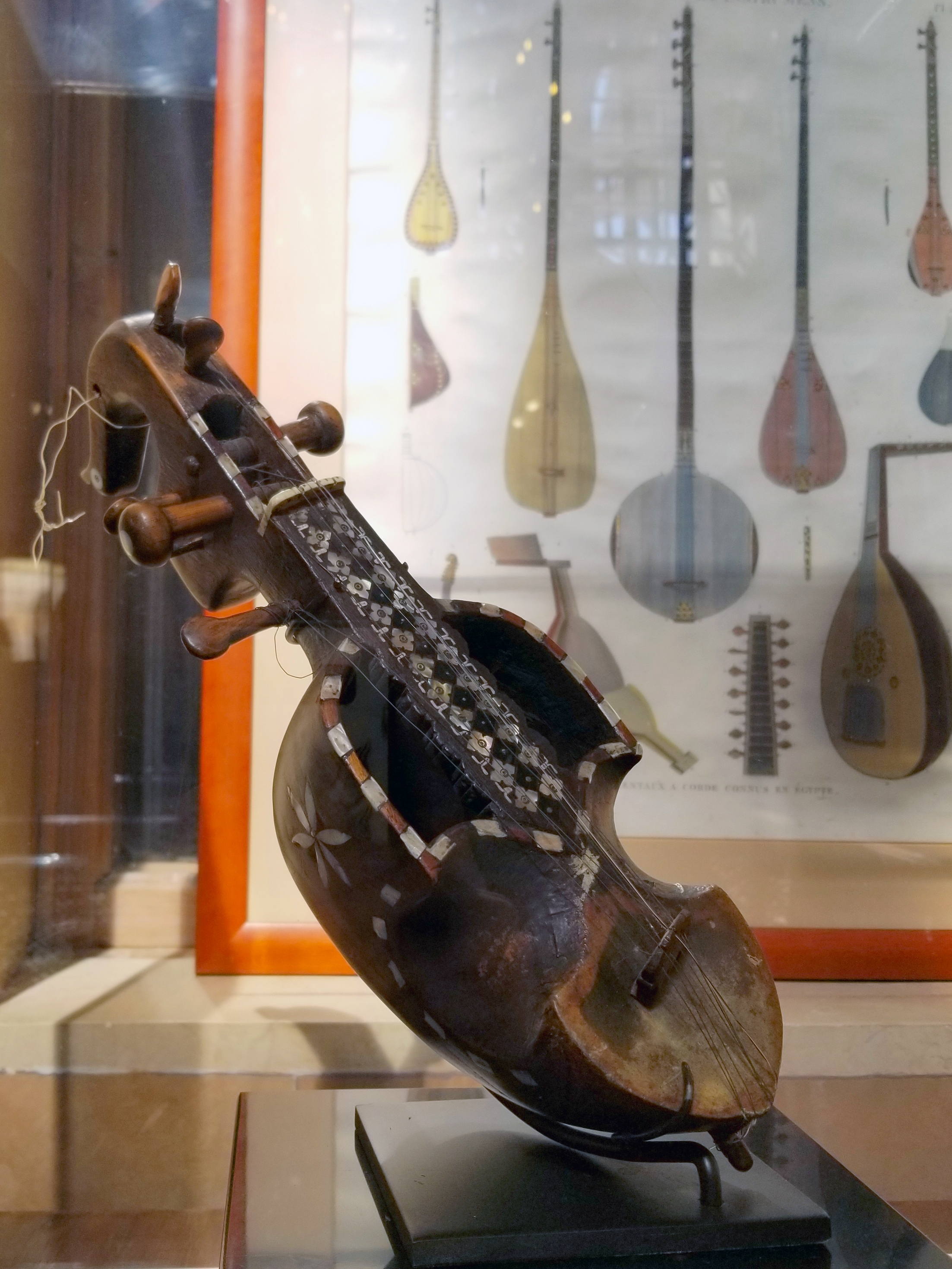
Arab string musical instrument on display at the Debbane Palace museum, Lebanon

A single string at a certain tension and length only produces one note. To produce multiple notes, string instruments use one of two methods. One is to add enough strings to cover the required range of different notes (e.g., as with the piano, which has sets of 88 strings to enable the performer to play 88 different notes). The other is to provide a way to stop the strings along their length to shorten the part that vibrates, which is the method used in guitar and violin family instruments to produce different notes from the same string. The piano and harp represent the first method, where each note on the instrument has its own string or course of multiple strings tuned to the same note. (Many notes on a piano are strung with a "choir" of three strings tuned alike, to increase the volume.) A guitar represents the second method—the player's fingers push the string against the fingerboard so that the string is pressed firmly against a metal fret. Pressing the string against a fret while plucking or strumming it shortens the vibrating part and thus produces a different note.

Some zithers combine stoppable (melody) strings with a greater number of "open" harmony or chord strings. On instruments with stoppable strings, such as the violin or guitar, the player can shorten the vibrating length of the string, using their fingers directly (or more rarely through some mechanical device, as in the nyckelharpa and the hurdy-gurdy). Such instruments usually have a fingerboard attached to the neck of the instrument, that provides a hard flat surface the player can stop the strings against. On some string instruments, the fingerboard has frets, raised ridges perpendicular to the strings, that stop the string at precise intervals, in which case the fingerboard is also called a fretboard.

Moving frets during performance is usually impractical. The bridges of a koto, on the other hand, may be moved by the player occasionally in the course of a single piece of music. Many modern Western harps include levers, either directly moved by fingers (on Celtic harps) or controlled by foot pedals (on orchestral harps), to raise the pitch of individual strings by a fixed amount. The Middle Eastern zither, the qanun, is equipped with small levers called mandal that let each course of multiple strings be incrementally retuned "on the fly" while the instrument is being played. These levers raise or lower the pitch of the string course by a microtone, less than a half step.

== Sympathetic strings ==
Some instruments are employed with sympathetic strings—which are additional strings not meant to be plucked. These strings resonate with the played notes, creating additional tones. Sympathetic strings vibrate naturally when various intervals, such as the unisons or the octaves of the notes of the sympathetic strings are plucked, bowed or struck. This system is used on the sarangi, the grand piano, the hardanger fiddle and the rubab.

== Sound production ==
=== Acoustic instruments ===
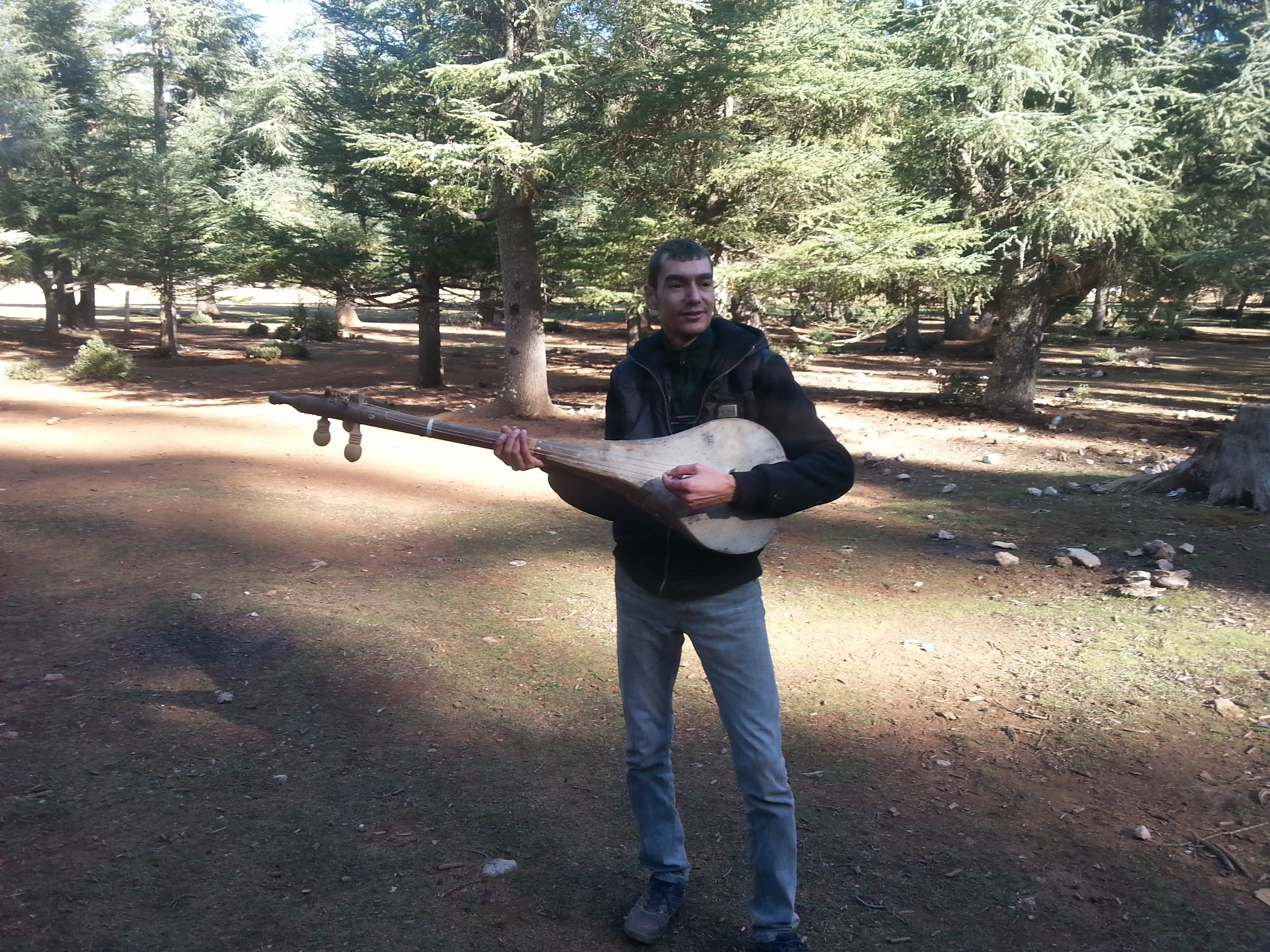
The Moroccan loutar uses a soundboard made of goatskin.

A vibrating string strung on a very thick log, as a hypothetical example, would make only a very quiet sound, so string instruments are usually constructed in such a way that the vibrating string is coupled to a hollow resonating chamber, a soundboard, or both. On the violin, for example, the four strings pass over a thin wooden bridge resting on a hollow box (the body of the violin). The normal force applied to the body from the strings is supported in part by a small cylinder of wood called the soundpost. The violin body also has two "f-holes" carved on the top. The strings' vibrations are distributed via the bridge and soundpost to all surfaces of the instrument, and are thus made louder by matching of the acoustic impedance. The correct technical explanation is that they allow a better match to the acoustic impedance of the air.

It is sometimes said that the sounding board or soundbox "amplifies" the sound of the strings. In reality, no power amplification occurs, because all of the energy to produce sound comes from the vibrating string. The mechanism is that the sounding board of the instrument provides a larger surface area to create sound waves than that of the string and therefore acts as a matching element between the acoustic impedance of the string and that of the surrounding air. A larger vibrating surface can sometimes produce better matching; especially at lower frequencies.

All lute-type instruments traditionally have a bridge, which holds the string at the proper action height from the fret/finger board at one end of the strings. On acoustic instruments, the bridge performs an equally important function of transmitting string energy into the "sound box" of the instrument, thereby increasing the sound volume. The specific design, and materials used in the construction of the bridge of an instrument, have a dramatic impact upon both the sound and responsiveness of the instrument.

Achieving a tonal characteristic that is effective and pleasing to the player's and listener's ear is something of an art and craft, as well as a science, and the makers of string instruments often seek very high quality woods to this end, particularly spruce (chosen for its lightness, strength and flexibility) and maple (a very hard wood). Spruce is used for the sounding boards of instruments from the violin to the piano. Instruments such as the banjo use a drum, covered in natural or synthetic skin, as their soundboard.

Acoustic instruments can also be made of artificial materials, such as carbon fiber and fiberglass (particularly the larger, lower-pitched instruments, such as cellos and basses).

In the early 20th century, the Stroh violin used a diaphragm-type resonator and a metal horn to project the string sound, much like early mechanical gramophones. Its use declined beginning about 1920, as electronic amplification through power amplifiers and loudspeakers was developed and came into use. String instrument players can electronically amplify their instruments by connecting them to a PA system or a guitar amplifier.

=== Electronic amplification ===
Most string instruments can be fitted with piezoelectric or magnetic pickups to convert the string's vibrations into an electrical signal that is amplified and then converted back into sound by loudspeakers. Some players attach a pickup to their traditional string instrument to "electrify" it. Another option is to use a solid-bodied instrument, which reduces unwanted feedback howls or squeals.

Amplified string instruments can be much louder than their acoustic counterparts, so musicians can play them in relatively loud rock, blues, and jazz ensembles. Amplified instruments can also have their amplified tone modified by using electronic effects such as distortion, reverb, or wah-wah.

Bass-register string instruments such as the double bass and the electric bass are amplified with bass instrument amplifiers that are designed to reproduce low-frequency sounds. To modify the tone of amplified bass instruments, a range of electronic bass effects are available, such as distortion and chorus.

== Symphonic strings ==
The string instruments usually used in the orchestra, and often called the "symphonic strings" or string section are:

- Violins (divided into two sections—first violins and second violins; these sections play exactly the same instruments; the difference is that the first violins play higher-register lines and the second violins play lower-register parts, accompaniment parts or counter-melodies)
- Violas
- Cellos
- Double basses

When orchestral instrumentation specifies "strings", it often means this combination of string parts. Orchestral works rarely omit any of these string parts, but often include additional string instruments, especially the concert harp and piano. In the Baroque orchestra from the 1600s–1750 (or with modern groups playing early music) harpsichord is almost always used to play the basso continuo part (the written-out bass line and improvised chords), and often a theorbo or lute or a pipe organ. In some classical music, such as the string quartet, the double bass is not typically used; the cello plays the bass role in this literature.

== See also ==
- "Essay on the fingering of the violoncello and on the conduct of the bow"
- List of string instruments
- Luthier (maker of stringed instruments)
- Musical acoustics
- Ravanahatha
- String instrument extended technique
- String instrument repertoire
- String orchestra
- Stringed instrument tunings
