= Julius Mosen =

German poet and author of Jewish descent

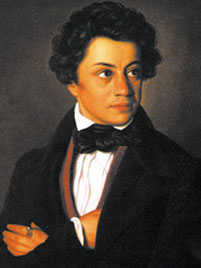
Julius Mosen, depiction by an unknown artist

Julius Mosen (8 July 1803 – 10 October 1867) was a German poet and author of Jewish descent, associated with the Young Germany movement, and now remembered principally for his patriotic poem the Andreas-Hofer-Lied.

== Life ==
Julius Mosen (Julius Moses) was born at Marieney in the Saxon Vogtland, the son of Johannes Gottlob Moses, the cantor and schoolmaster of Marieney. He studied at the Gymnasium in Plauen from 1817 to 1822, and afterwards studied law at the University of Jena. During a two-year-long visit to Italy, he received the inspiration that resulted several years later in his major works (Ritter Wahn, Cola Rienzi, Der Kongreß von Verona).

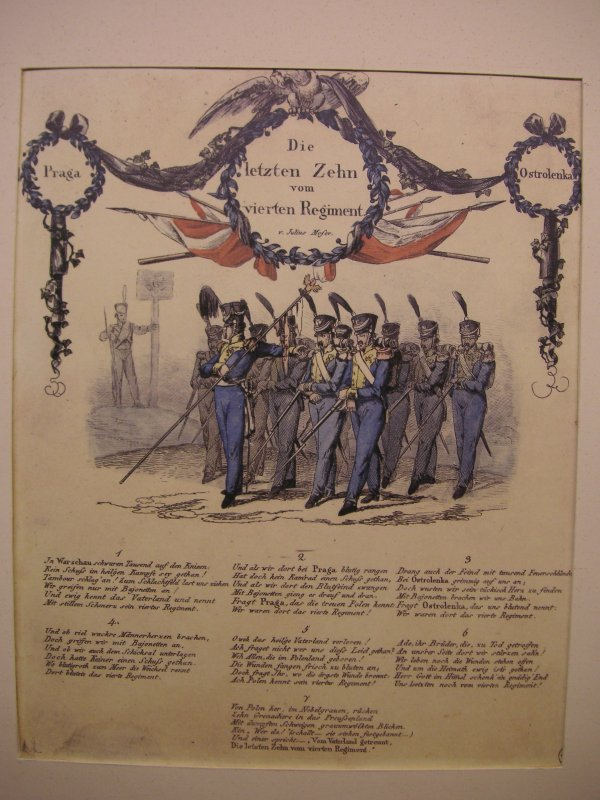
A steel engraving inspired by Mosen's "Die letzte zehn" poem

On his return, he finished his law studies at Leipzig, where he then worked as a lawyer. From 1835 to 1844 he was an independent advocate in Dresden. He had meanwhile shown great literary promise in his Lied vom Ritter Wahn (1831). This was followed by the more philosophical Ahasvar (1838), and by a volume of poems, Gedichte (1836, 2nd ed., 1843), among which Andreas Hofer and Die letzten Zehn vom vierten Regiment became popular. As an active freemason in Dresden he encountered several important literary figures, including Ludwig Tieck, Ludwig Uhland, Georg Herwegh, Richard Wagner and Gottfried Semper, and was soon himself reckoned to be among the best-known German poets.

He also wrote the historical plays Heinrich der Fünfte (Leipzig, 1836), Cola Rienzi, Die Bräute von Florenz, Wendelin und Helene and Kaiser Otto III (the four last being published in his Theater 1842). His tragedies were very well received and were performed at the Dresden court theatre (Dresdner Hofbühne). For his services to German theatre the faculty of Philosophy at the University of Jena awarded him an honorary doctorate.

In addition he tried his hand at fiction, in his only novel, the politico-historical Der Kongress von Verona (1842), and in a collection of short stories published in 1846, Bilder im Moose.

In 1844 the Grand Duke Paul Friedrich August von Oldenburg offered him the appointment of dramaturgist at the Court Theatre in Oldenburg, which he accepted, in the hope of putting into practice his vision of German national theatre. In the same year he had his family name changed from "Moses" to "Mosen" by Dresden ministerial decree. In 1846 he was stricken with paralysis as the result of a rheumatic illness, and after remaining bed-ridden for the rest of his life, died at Oldenburg on 10 October 1867. He was buried in the churchyard of St. Gertrude's Chapel (Gertrudenfriedhof) in Oldenburg.

Of his later works may be mentioned Die Dresdner Gemäldegallerie (1844), and the tragedies Herzog Bernhard (1855) and Der Sohn des Fürsten (1858). A collection of his works, Sämtliche Werke, appeared in 8 volumes in 1863 (a new edition was produced by his son, with a biography, in 6 volumes in 1880).

== Artistic work ==
His best-known poem is the text of the "Andreas-Hofer-Lied" ("Zu Mantua in Banden"), the present anthem of the Austrian Bundesland of the Tyrol. Robert Schumann wrote a lied using as lyrics his poem 'Der Nussbaum' (the walnut tree). German composer Georgina Schubert used his text for her lieder “Der traumende See.”

There are three principal themes in Mosen's life and work: love of the home country, the battle for freedom, and the now-destroyed German-Jewish symbiosis.

In Erinnerungen ("Memories"), he writes of the "dependency on the soil of home, the Vogtland" that draws and holds the gaze "as though yonder, far back in the distance beneath the sap-dripping pines, there where the mountains rise up like terraces in dark blue, some secret were hidden that lures us to it and that would gladly reveal itself to us". The Vogtländer for him are the "Saxon Tyrolese, only pleasanter, livelier, more persistent in the pursuit of their goal, but just as sober, if also rougher."

== Works ==
- Ritter Wahn, epic poem, 1831
- Gedichte, poems, 1836 (2nd ed 1843)
- Heinrich der Fünfte, drama, 1836
- Ahasvar, 1838
- Der Kongreß von Verona, novel, 1842
- Kaiser Otto der Dritte, drama, 1842
- Cola Rienzi, drama, 1842 (in Theater)
- Wendelin und Helene, drama, 1842 (in Theater)
- Kaiser Otto III, drama, 1842 (in Theater)
- Die Bräute von Florenz, drama, 1842 (in Theater)
- Die Dresdner Gemäldegallerie, 1844
- Bilder im Moose, collection of novellas, 1846
- Bernhard von Weimar, drama, 1855
- Der Sohn des Fürsten, drama, 1858
- Erinnerungen, autobiography
