= Georg Abraham Schneider =

German musician and composer (1770–1839)

- Born: 19 April 1770; Darmstadt, Germany
- Died: 19 January 1839 (aged 68); Berlin, Germany
- Occupations: Composer; Horn Player

Georg Abraham Schneider (19 April 1770 – 19 January 1839) was a German musician and composer.

== Biography ==
Schneider was born in Darmstadt, where he originally learnt music as a member of the city's alta cappella. From 1787 he played horn in the court orchestra of the nobel house Hessen-Darmstadt, then from 1795 for the Prussian royal court.

Schneider's compositions and performances focussed on the horn, and owe a stylistic debt to Haydn and Mozart. The invention of the valved horn by Heinrich Stölzel and Friedrich Blühmel was of great interest to Schneider, allowing the instrument to be played chromatically for the first time. In a report for the Allgemeine musikalische Zeitung in 1817, Schneider wrote; "Because of its full and strong, yet soft and attractive tone, the Waldhorn is an extremely beautiful instrument; but, as is well known, it has until now been far behind almost all other wind instruments in its development, being very restricted to its natural notes .... Herr Stölzel of Breslau has now completely removed these shortcomings .... He has simply provided his horn with two airtight valves, which are depressed with little effort by two fingers of the right hand, like the keys of the pianoforte, and restored to their previous position by the same two fingers with the help of attached springs; with these it is not only possible but also easy to produce a pure and completely chromatic scale from the lowest to the highest notes with a perfectly even tone. On this horn, therefore, there is no need to change from one key to another, and the same passage can be repeated immediately in a different key; even passages which previously were absolutely impossible to play on the normal horn can now be performed without difficulty." The development of these valves led to the development of the instrument now known as the French horn.

Schneider wrote the first work for valved horn, which was performed publicly in 1818. In 1820 he was promoted to royal director of music, then in 1825 appointed director of the Court Orchestra. In his later life he taught at the Prussian Academy of the Arts.

Schneider's daughter Maschinka married Dresden composer François Schubert (not related to Franz Schubert), and they had a daughter, singer and composer Georgina Schubert.

He died in Berlin in 1839.

== Discography ==
- Georg Abraham Schneider: Preußens Hofkapellmeister - Adorján Quartett, Label: Phil.harmonie
- Schneider: Flute Trios - Trio d'argent
- Georg Abraham Schneider: Three Flute Concertos - Gaby Pas-Van Riet (flute), Württemberg Chamber Orchestra Heilbronn; Johannes Moesus - Label: CPO
- Georg Abraham Schneider: 6 Solos for Viola, Op. 19 & Variations, Op. 44 (arranged for viola by Marco Misciagna) - Marco Misciagna, viola - Label: MM25, 2025
