= Karl Egon Ebert =

Czech-German poet (1801–1882)

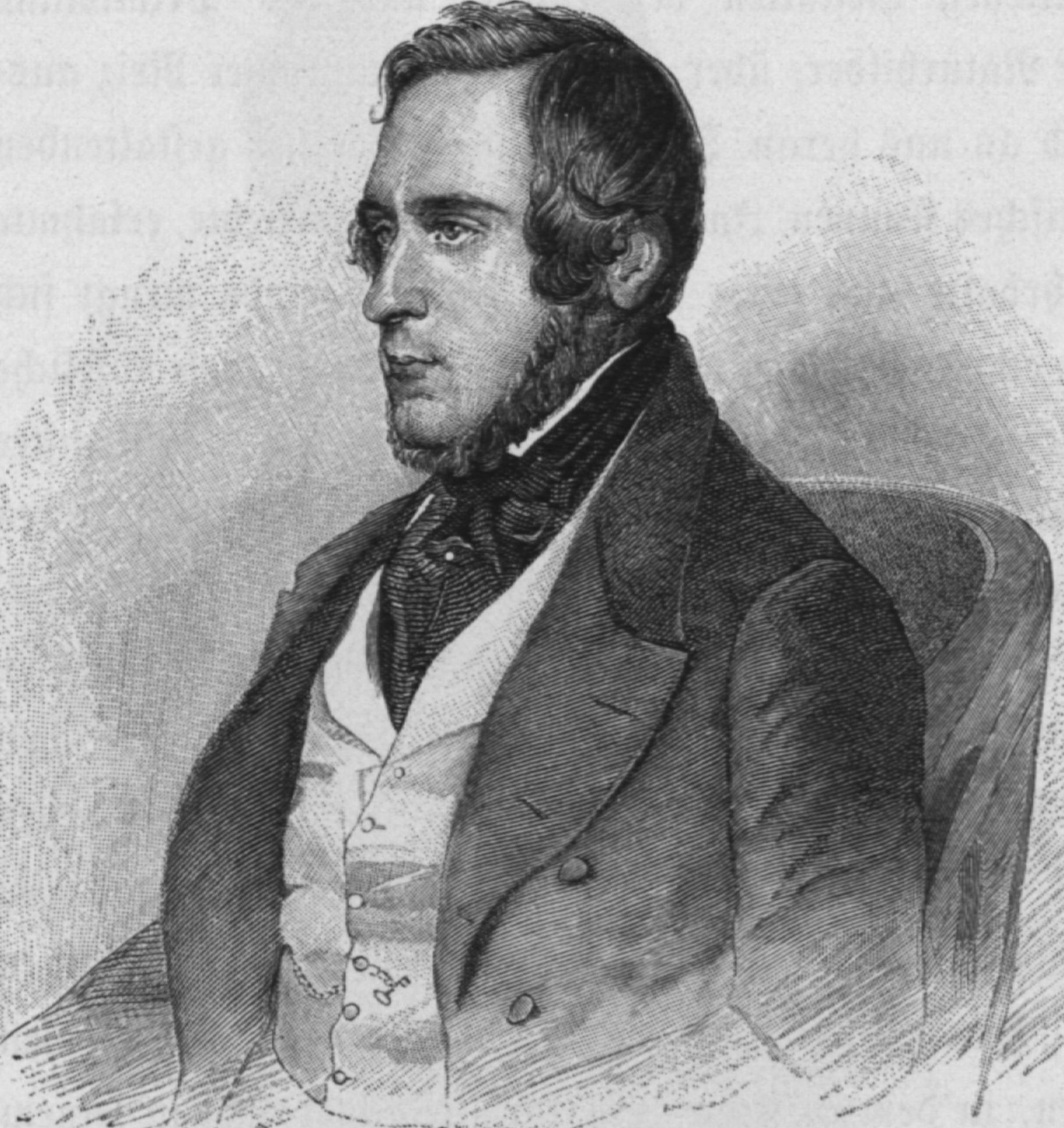
Ebert in 1850

Karl Egon Ebert (5 June 1801 – 24 October 1882) was a Czech-German poet.

== Life ==
Ebert was born on 5 June 1801 in Prague. He worked for the noble Fürstenberg family as a librarian and later as the administrator of their properties.

Although he was a German-language poet, he was a Czech patriot. He wrote about scenes from Czech history and mythology, and František Palacký was among his friends. His notable works include the heroic epic Vlasta. He was a supporter of close Czech-German cooperation and linguistic equality.

His poems, dramatic and lyric, are collected in seven volumes, and enjoy a wide popularity in his country. He composed a poem called Das erste Veilchen ("The First Violet"), which was set to music by Felix Mendelssohn.

German composer Georgina Schubert used Ebert's text for her lieder "Der Muschel gleichen meine Leider."

He died on 24 October 1882 in Smíchov (now part of Prague).
