= Johann Nepomuk Schelble =

German musician and composer

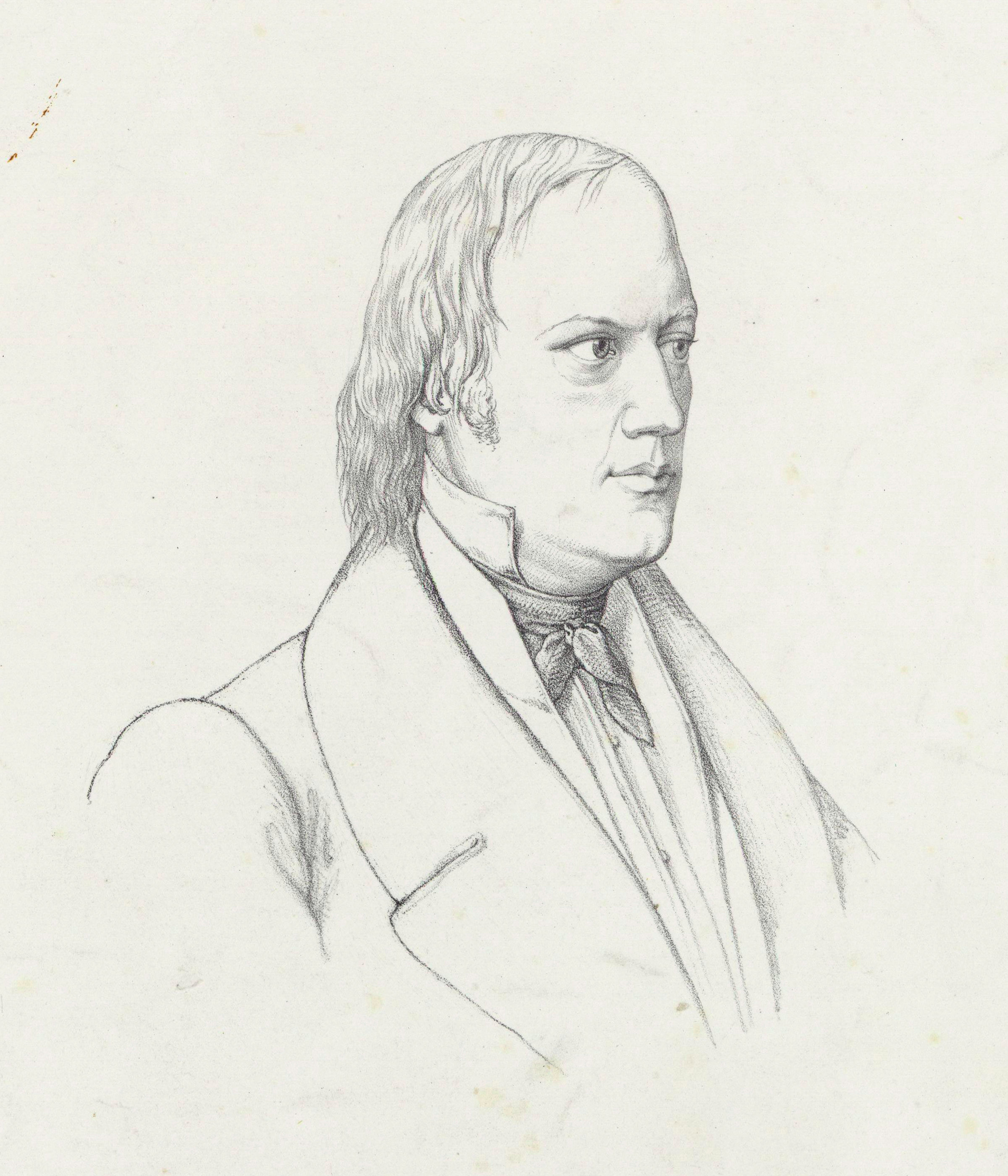
Johann Nepomuk Schelble

Johann Nepomuk Schelble (16 May 1789 – 6 August 1837), was a German conductor, composer, singer (tenor) and music teacher. Best known as the founding conductor of Cäcilienverein (the Choir of Saint Cecilia, known today as the Cäcilienchor Frankfurt), he also helped revive interest in the work of Johann Sebastian Bach.

== Biography ==
Johann Nepomuk Schelble was born in Hüfingen, a small town in the Black Forest in what is now the Schwarzwald-Baar District in the south of what would soon be the Grand Duchy of Baden but was still at that point part of the soon to end Holy Roman Empire. He was the second of 14 children and the only son of barrel painter Franz (or Franciscus) Joseph (Donat) Schelble (17 February 1762 – 13 February 1835) and Katharina Schelble née Götz (1 November 1760 – 4 April 1847),

The Schelble family had a history of musical interest. Katharina Götz, the daughter of a wealthy farmer, was both musically inclined and possessed a beautiful singing voice. Franz Josef Scheble had received instruction in Donaueschingen in both organ and piano playing, although he gave up his aspirations as a musician due to his poor singing voice; he continued to make pianos as a hobby. Both Franz Josef and his father Franz Xaver Scheble played violin in their church.

Katharina sang the first songs Johann was to hear, and he was to receive his initial instruction on the piano from his father. Even as a young child, he demonstrated a particular gift for music, and so it was only a question of time before the boy's talent developed and – despite the interruption of frequent wars – found its expression. On an Austrian piano-playing field trip, the 7-year-old boy became acquainted with the melodies of Mozart.

The vicar Eiselin was to become Schelble's first official teacher in singing. Fearing the discouragement of his other pupils due to the great advances Nepomuk was making, the curate dismissed him from his studies with the explanation that he “lacked talent.” In 1800, the young Schelble became a choir boy in the royal diocese of Obermarchtal, at the time an important Swabian monastery. Although the instruction he was to receive there was similarly pedantic and bore little in the way of real results, Schelble was nevertheless to receive his first deep impressions of what music could be: the nightly psalms of the monks accompanied by the organ playing of the famous “Contrapuntal” Sixt Bachmann remained indelibly etched in his memory.

At the age of 18, Schelble obtained a position as court and opera singer in Stuttgart, and having there begun the study of composition, he wrote an opera (Graf Adalbert) and other smaller pieces for voices or instruments; there too he was appointed teacher at the musical school of the city. Seven years later, in 1814, Schelble went to Vienna, where he made the acquaintance of Beethoven. Among other of his compositions during his stay is a Missa solemnis for four voices and orchestra.

Schelble's career next took him to Frankfurt, where in June 1816 Schelble entered into contract negotiations with the National Theater in Frankfurt. A letter of Schelble's to the singer Graff in Frankfurt states that he had definitely decided to leave the Imperial States. Frustrated with protracted negotiations, Schelble went to Berlin, where in 1818 his friend Clemens Brentano procured him a place as first tenor. There Schelble became even better known with Zelter and the Sing-Akademie zu Berlin.

A few years later, Schleble moved back to Frankfurt. There he began to give a weekly musical entertainment in his own house; these meetings were popular, and before long he was able to give them a permanent form under the title Cäcilienverein. Founded in 1818 and modeled off the Sing-Adademie, this society grew steadily, beginning with 21 members and growing to a hundred within a few years. The first concert given was the Magic Flute of Mozart; soon followed works by Händel, Mozart, Haydn and Beethoven, and after 1828 those of Bach, and earlier composers such as Palestrina, Pergolesi, etc.

In 1820, Schelble began what would prove to be a loving but childless marriage with Molli Müller, a young woman from Königsberg. Throughout his life, Schelble maintained close ties to his Hüfingen relatives, even acquiring a "small country estate" (Landgütchen) in 1824 or 1825, which he affectionately referred to as his "Tranquil Valley" (Ruhetal).

In 1822, the 13 year-old Felix Mendelssohn stayed with the Schelbles in Frankfurt upon returning from a trip to Switzerland and found a loving and paternal friend in Schelble. Mendelssohn visited Schelble often in Frankfurt and stayed with him. In 1831 Schelble commissioned Mendelssohn to write an Oratorio on behalf of the Society of St Cecilia. Mendelssohn chose as his subject St. Paul (oratorio).

In 1836, Schelble's health became impaired, and he returned to Hüfingen to recuperate. Mendelssohn took over conducting the choir, and Schelble wrote to him with great affection. Mendelssohn, whose father died about this time, wrote to Schelble in return: "You are the only friend who after such a loss can fill the place of my father".

Schelble's health failed to improve, and at the age of 48, he died in his wife's arms at the entrance to his house on Bräunlinger Straße in Hüfingen. In 1842, Schelble's widow married Georg Konrad, a man from Sankt Georgen im Schwarzwald, a town in Southwestern Baden-Württemberg, Germany found in the Schwarzwald-Baar-Kreis District.
