= Friedrich Blühmel =

German musician and inventor

Friedrich Blühmel (born 1777, died before 1845) was a German horn player and musical instrument builder. He is credited as one of the earliest inventors of brass instrument valves.

== Biography ==
Friedrich Blühmel initially worked as a coal miner, whilst also learning to play the violin and various woodwind instruments. In 1808 he started playing trumpet and horn and began calling himself a Berghautboist, an old German term for a mine musician, playing in a band in Waldenburg, Silesia.

Around 1813, Blühmel designed a valve system for brass instruments, apparently independently of his fellow horn player Heinrich Stölzel who created a similar system at around the same time.

Both inventors added two valves to the natural horn, allowing the instrument to play a full chromatic series. This allowed the horn to develop into a more useful melodic instrument, eventually becoming the instrument known today as the French horn.

In 1818, Friedrich Blühmel and Heinrich Stölzel registered a patent for their two-valve chromatic horn. This was expanded in 1819 to a three-valve system by the instrument builder Christian Friedrich Sattler in Leipzig.

The first trumpets with this valve system were built in 1820, with almost all brass instruments eventually including such systems during the following decades.
