= Blacker =

Blacker may refer to:

== People ==
- Carlos Blacker ("C.P. Blacker", 1895–1975), British war hero, psychiatrist and eugenicist
- Carmen Blacker (1924–2009), British scholar of the Japanese language, daughter of Carlos Blacker
- Cecil Blacker (1916–2002), British soldier and Adjutant-General to the Forces, father of Terence Blacker, great-grandson of William Blacker
- Charles Blacker Vignoles (1793–1875), British railway engineer, eponym of the Vignoles flat-bottomed rail
- Coit D. Blacker, 20th- and 21st-century American academic in international studies, Special Assistant for National Security Affairs to President Clinton
- David Blacker, 21st-century Sri Lankan Burgher author and creative director in advertising
- Eveline Dew Blacker (1884–1956), British architect
- George Blacker (antiquary) (1791–1871), Irish clergyman and antiquary
- George Blacker (obstetrician) (1865–1948), British–Irish obstetrician
- Harold Blacker (1889–1944), judge in British India
- Jeremy Blacker (1939–2005), British soldier, Master-General of the Ordnance
- Jesse Blacker (born 1991), Canadian professional ice hockey defenceman, playing for the Texas Stars of the American Hockey League
- Jim Blacker (born 1945), British professional footballer for Bradford City
- Kate Blacker (born 1955), British artist
- Maxwell Blacker (1822–1888), English cricketer
- Peter Blacker (born 1941), Australian Nationals politician in South Australia
- Robert R. Blacker (1845–1931), American lumberman, for whom the Manistee County Airport and Robert R. Blacker House are named
- Sarah Blacker (born 1983), American singer-songwriter
- Stewart Blacker (1887–1964), British soldier and inventor of several anti-tank weapons
- Terence Blacker (born 1948), British author and columnist, son of Cecil Blacker
- Thetis Blacker (1927–2006), British painter and singer
- Valentine Blacker (1778–1826), British East India Company soldier and Surveyor General of India
- William Blacker (1777–1855), British soldier and Commissioner of the Treasury of Ireland, an original member of the Orange Institution; great-grandfather of Cecil Blacker
- William Blacker (angler), 19th-century British angler, author of Blacker's Art of Fly Making
- William Blacker (politician) (1843–1913), Australian Liberal politician in South Australia
- Anthony Blacker Elliott (1887–1970), British–Irish clergyman, bishop in South India

== Other uses ==
- Blacker (security), a U.S. Department of Defense computer network security project
  - a slang term for an encryption device; see red/black concept
- Blacker (Transformers), a fictional character from the 1989 anime series Transformers: Victory
- Blacker, someone who creates Black MIDI music
- Blacker's Art of Fly Making, an 1842 book on angling by William Blacker
- Blacker Bombard, a World War II-era British anti-tank weapon invented by Stewart Blacker
- Blacker House at the California Institute of Technology
- Manistee County Blacker Airport (IATA: MBL, ICAO: KMBL), serving the American town of Manistee, Michigan, named for Robert R. Blacker
- Robert R. Blacker House, a 1907 residence in Pasadena, California, listed on the U.S. National Register of Historic Places in 1986
