= George Blacker =

George Blacker may refer to:

- George Blacker (antiquary) (1791–1871), Irish clergyman and antiquary
- Sir George Blacker (obstetrician) (1865–1948), British–Irish obstetrician

== See also ==
- George Black (disambiguation)
- Blacker (disambiguation)
- George Blackerby (1903–1987), American professional baseball player
