= Colonel Blacker =

Colonel Blacker may refer to:

- Lieutenant-Colonel Valentine Blacker (1778-1826), British Army officer
- Lieutenant-Colonel William Blacker (1777-1885), British Army officer
- Lieutenant-Colonel Stewart Blacker (1887–1964), British Army officer
