= The Crimson Banner =

Song
- Written: Lieutenant-Colonel William Blacker
- Published: 1818
- Songwriter: William Blacker

"The Crimson Banner" is a traditional Irish song, also known as "The Eighteenth of December" and "No Surrender!". Written by William Blacker in 1818, it is part of the Protestant Loyalist tradition.

The song celebrates the closing of the gates of the Ulster city of Derry to the approaching Jacobite Irish Army on 18 December 1688. Its lyrics also cover the subsequent Siege of Derry in 1689 when the Williamite forces held out until being relieved. The siege popularised the term "No Surrender!", which had previously been used by the defenders of Bandon earlier the same year.

The song's title refers to the crimson banner, a traditional gesture of defiance during sieges, which flew throughout the Derry campaign.

== Bibliography ==
- Allan Blackstock & Eoin Magennis. Politics and Political Culture in Britain and Ireland, 1750-1850: Essays in Tribute to Peter Jupp. Ulster Historical Foundation, 2007.
