= Parable of the drowning man =

Story of a religious man who refuses offers of rescue

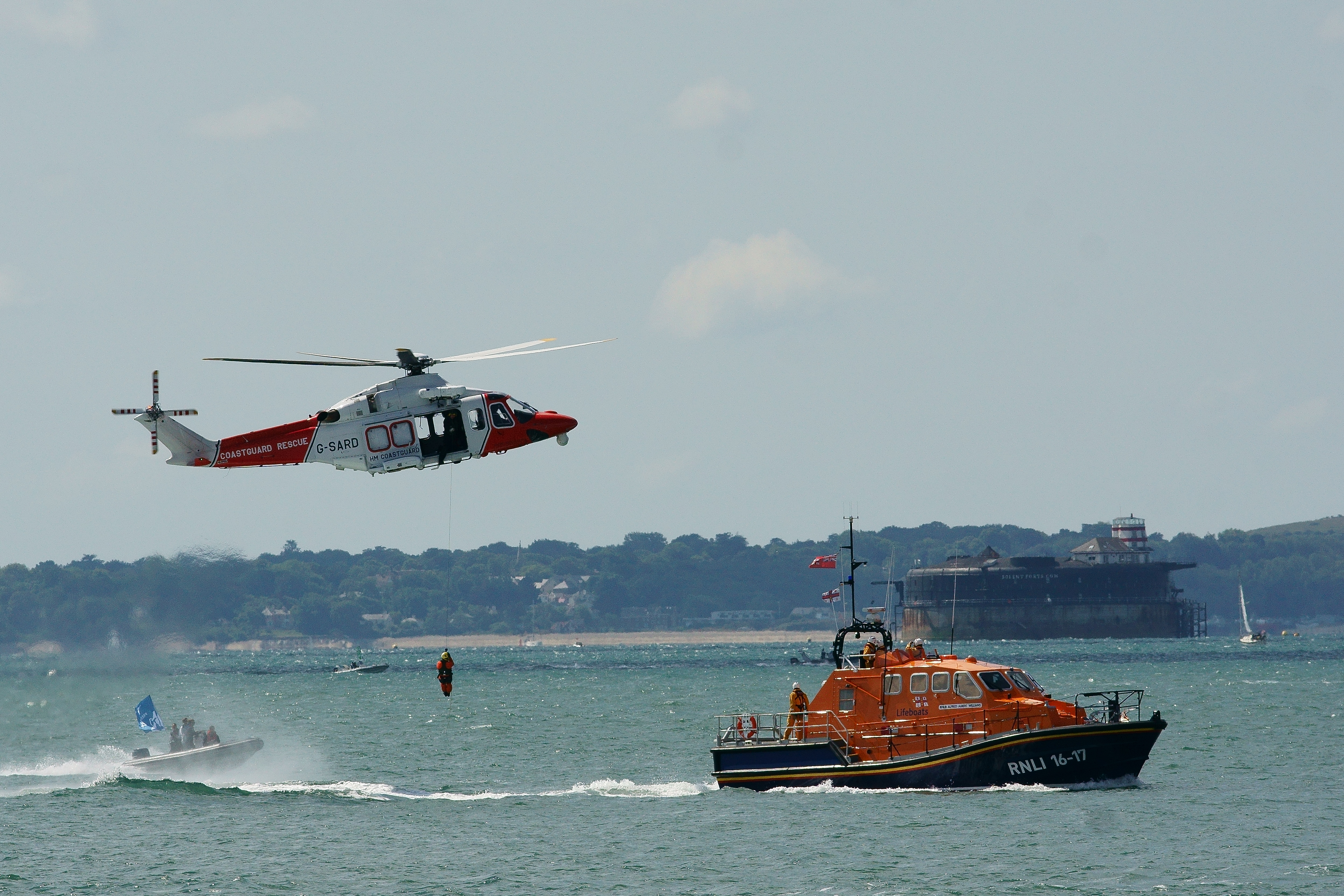
Two boats and a helicopter, the instruments of rescue most frequently cited in the parable, during a coastguard rescue demonstration

The parable of the drowning man, also known as Two Boats and a Helicopter, is a short story, often told as a joke, most often about a devoutly Christian man, frequently a minister, who refuses several rescue attempts in the face of approaching floodwaters, each time telling the rescuers that God will save him. He finally drowns in the flood and, standing before God, asks why he was not saved. God replies that He sent the rescuers that the man turned down.

Frequently retold within the American Protestant community (although Catholics tell the story as well, and Hindu, Buddhist, and Jewish versions have been recorded), the story is considered to reinforce the aphorism that "God helps those who help themselves" contrary to the idea that believers should passively await miracles. Outside of the religious context, it has been used by speakers and writers discussing marketing strategies, politics and workplace safety training. During the COVID-19 pandemic, modified versions, in which the religious man refuses several entreaties to wear a mask and later to get vaccinated, finding out after his death from the disease that God motivated those people as well, circulated among Christian communities to counter vaccine hesitancy. Several novelists, including Jeffery Deaver and Richard Ford, have had characters tell the story in their fiction; an episode of the TV series The Leftovers also takes its title from this story.

It is not known when the story was first told, although it is believed to date to the early or mid-20th century United States. Those who have considered its origins speculate that it might have started as a joke at the expense of Pentecostalism, an evangelical denomination that believes God still works miracles on Earth. A deeper reading has it as a way Christians reconciled a belief in an omnipotent God with the increasing ability of human technology to accomplish that which had previously seemed impossible.

== Synopsis ==
A typical version, as recounted on Psychology Today's website in 2009:

A storm descends on a small town, and the downpour soon turns into a flood. As the waters rise, the local preacher kneels in prayer on the church porch, surrounded by water. By and by, one of the townsfolk comes up the street in a canoe.

"Better get in, Preacher. The waters are rising fast."

"No," says the preacher. "I have faith in the Lord. He will save me."

Still the waters rise. Now the preacher is up on the balcony, wringing his hands in supplication, when another guy zips up in a motorboat.

"Come on, Preacher. We need to get you out of here. The levee's gonna break any minute."

Once again, the preacher is unmoved. "I shall remain. The Lord will see me through."

After a while the levee breaks, and the flood rushes over the church until only the steeple remains above water. The preacher is up there, clinging to the cross, when a helicopter descends out of the clouds, and a state trooper calls down to him through a megaphone.

"Grab the ladder, Preacher. This is your last chance."

Once again, the preacher insists the Lord will deliver him.

And, predictably, he drowns.

A pious man, the preacher goes to heaven. After a while he gets an interview with God, and he asks the Almighty, "Lord, I had unwavering faith in you. Why didn't you deliver me from that flood?"

God shakes his head. "What did you want from me? I sent you two boats and a helicopter."

=== Variants ===
In some versions the minister exhorts every rescuer to go to the aid of someone he perceives as more vulnerable first. In others the man questions the faith of those who would rescue him. Another version has the first rescuer come in a land vehicle, enforcing an order to evacuate; in some versions that start this way the helicopter is dispensed with in favor of the two boats. The divine figure at the end who delivers the punchline is also sometimes not God but St. Peter, in his capacity as the gatekeeper to heaven, or Jesus.

Novelist Richard Ford has a character in his 2006 The Lay of the Land tell a version he calls "the three boats story". The protagonist, instead of being threatened by a rising flood, is afloat in the ocean without a life preserver. Three boats come by, all of which he refuses in the belief divine intervention will be his salvation; God informs him after he drowns that the boats were his intervention.

Scholar David Cooper similarly records the parable as involving three boats, albeit taking place in the usual setting of a rising flood rather than the open sea. In the version he retells, the protagonist is also female. He also writes of a Jewish version, in which the protagonist is a rabbi who, after his death, angrily asks God why all his dutifully performed mitzvot did not move God to save him. "You schmuck!", God responds, in Yiddish. "I sent three boats!" (Note: Jewish humorist Leo Rosten also recounts the story with a rabbi as the protagonist; a 1997 British religious education textbook identifies a version with an entire family putting all their faith in God, and a neighbor's cart as the first rescue option, as "a Jewish parable".) In her book Replenishing the Earth, Kenyan environmentalist and Nobel Peace Prize winner Wangari Maathai retells the parable as "a popular Buddhist story", in which the protagonist appeals to Guanyin for intercession.

Some versions end with a reminder that the protagonist was actually not as faithful as he believed himself to be, since he failed to recognize the rescuers as God's promise being kept. Versions with St. Peter as the interlocutor have him telling the man he will be forgiven for his lack of faith right before the punchline. Ford's version goes farther, with the man being condemned to Hell for his faithlessness.

==== Global warming variants ====
This parable has been related to the issue of sea level rise in the context of climate change. It was specifically related by Al Gore to the residents of Tangier Island in 2018, an island in Chesapeake Bay which is threatened by the sea level rise.

==== COVID-19 variants ====
Early in the COVID-19 pandemic, commentators recognized the applicability of the parable to the situation. It was soon rewritten to directly address the challenges containing the disease posed.

In April 2020, as cases in New Orleans rose, a contributor to magazine The Big Easy rewrote the parable for the pandemic. In it, the man responds to speeches from politicians, celebrities and finally social media posts from his friends, all urging him to wear a mask in public, practice social distancing and regularly wash hands. He responds to all of them by invoking God's protection; however he is eventually infected and dies. As in the primary version, the man confronts God, who is at the head of a large group of people, over this failure. God rejoins that he moved all the public figures and the man's friends to make speeches and social media posts, but since the man failed to heed them he could not be saved from the disease. Noticing the people behind God, the man asks who they are; God tells him they are all those who died because the man failed to take any measures to prevent the spread of the virus.

The following year, after vaccines had been developed and became widely available, hesitancy to get vaccinated became almost as widespread, with many of those refusing the vaccine claiming religious objections and stating that their faith in God was sufficient protection from the virus. Updated variants of the COVID-19 version of the parable appeared in which the man's third and final chance to save himself is the vaccine.

== History ==
The origins of the parable are not known. It began to appear in print in the early 1980s, used by a speaker at the 1982 Law of the Sea conference to illustrate a point about missed opportunities, but it is believed to have been in circulation since at least the mid-20th century, possibly even earlier than that, when it may have taken place just with boats, before helicopters became widely used. James Hudnut-Beumler, a professor of American religious history at Vanderbilt University, speculates that it might have originated as a joke at the expense of Pentecostalism, an evangelical denomination which holds, contrary to most other Protestants, that God still works miracles on Earth. O. Wesley Allen, who teaches homiletics at Southern Methodist University's Perkins School of Theology, sees it having come about as a way for Christians "to make their faith make sense in relation to scientific knowledge. In some sense, this joke has its origins in that air."

The parable probably spread verbally at first, as televangelists used it in sermons on radio and television. Eventually it began being written down, and used outside of a religious context. By 2009 one writer joked that "it has been scientifically proven that the joke has been used in a sermon in every church on the planet at least once. Yet congregations still pretend to chuckle warmly when the minister trots it out again."

== Exegeses ==
"This story has many morals" Maathai writes:

... that divine providence takes many forms; that our community around us offers many examples of holiness in action; that we should not keep waiting for miracles to occur when human agency may be all that is needed; that we would be foolish to squander the opportunities that may be right in front of us in favor of the highly unlikely million-to-one chance

A common lesson taken from it is that God helps those who help themselves. "None of us can expect God to sit back and do it all for us," Margaret Erickson, a Ventura County, California, supervisor, said after retelling the parable while testifying in 1990 before the U. S. House Committee on Transportation and Infrastructure's subcommittee on investigation and oversight.

Seventh-day Adventist Richard O'Ffill, who warns Christians against so broadly applying that principle, since it eliminates the need for prayer, finds the parable useful in chastising the other extreme: Christians who pray with the hope that God will respond with a "magic wand". "Have you ever considered that what we call the laws of nature, or natural law, or Mother Nature are all really the laws of God?" he writes, addressing those people directly. "These laws that work from cause to effect have been established by God as the way that things will be."

Some writers focus on the difficulty a person might have in accepting help when it is offered. "Many people have trouble recognizing help when it is being offered," say Chip Sawicki and Vernon Roberts in their 2011 book The Gift of Success. "If you continue to refuse it, though, eventually people will stop offering." Following a 2019 retelling set in the Netherlands, the authors of a self-help book observe that "even good men are hard to save from themselves."

Per Allen, other commentators have seen the parable as essential to reconciling faith and science. "Science produced those boats and designed that helicopter is turning away from the natural law of the Puritans—our ability to reason", writes Shawn Lawrence Otto in his 2011 book Fool Me Twice: Fighting the War On Science in America. He quotes The Rev. Peg Chemberlin, then president of the National Council of Churches, to the effect that a proper understanding of science can make possible a better understanding of Scripture. "It is our ability to reason that will save us, not our blind faith", writes another author who quotes Galileo's statement that he did not believe that God gave humanity its intellectual capacities with the intent that it would not be used. Similarly, Richard H. Schwartz has written that "Jews are not supposed to rely on miracles", in response to the story.

Randall Smith, writing for Robert Royal's website The Catholic Thing, finds this approach dovetails with Church teachings. He writes that he uses the parable to illuminate St. Thomas Aquinas's understanding of the metaphysics of creation, that for God creation is a continuous act, for his students. "So too with God's actions in the world: God can and usually does work in and through natural causes. Natural causality in the universe and God's divine causality are not mutually exclusive."

Even atheists have found the story useful. A guest poster on Hemant Mehta's blog, Friendly Atheist, recounted it in 2011 and after noting the usual message that one should take action to solve one's own problems rather than leaving it all up to God, called believers "delusional" when they attribute all their successes to God. "We're capable of overcoming just about any tough situation" they wrote. "It requires perseverance and loved ones. God is nowhere in the equation."

The parable has also been invoked in secular contexts. Jay Conrad Levinson, the developer of guerilla marketing, told the story in his 1999 book Mastering Guerilla Marketing. "Your boats and your helicopter are in this book and in your heart", he counseled readers. "You must believe in your product so much that your hallmark is passion." Workplace safety consultant Michael Manning retells the story to reinforce the importance of training employees in safety standards to the fullest extent: "Safety training requires doing all you reasonably can to help others help themselves."

== Analyses ==
Randall Smith, in his The Catholic Thing post, took issue with the use of the parable by antitheists to rebut belief in God. Specifically he responded to a cartoon that had recently appeared on the website Politico showing a Texan praising the helicopter that had rescued him from the roof of his flood-endangered house in the wake of the recent Hurricane Harvey as angels sent by God while one of the rescuers said they were actually Coast Guardsmen sent by the government. He criticized the cartoonist's logic as misrepresentative of how most Christians think. "Christians who believe in the sacramentality of all creation have no trouble accepting that God can work in and through natural causes" Smith wrote. "It's the atheist who has to insist that, if a natural cause such as a Coast Guard rescuer is involved, then God can't be."

Matt Cardin, in Ghosts, Spirits and Psychics, a survey of the paranormal, attributes the parable to British rabbi Lionel Blue, commenting that it "illustrates some of the different understandings in Semitic religions of the ways in which God might act." Like Smith, he characterizes Aquinas's view of a miracle as "God acting against nature—although as nature is God's creation, miracles could be viewed as perfecting rather than violating the natural order." In contrast, Jewish theologian and philosopher Baruch Spinoza saw "God and nature as one and the same", writes Cardin. "What is contrary to nature is contrary to reason and therefore absurd. If God acts at all, he does so through his creation, not in opposition to it."

=== Skepticism about use to overcome COVID-19 vaccine hesitancy ===
Slate religion correspondent Molly Olmstead believes that invoking the parable to combat COVID-19 vaccine hesitancy might be counterproductive. A researcher who has studied the subject suggests that most evangelical Christians who invoke God's protection as a reason not to get vaccinated actually have other concerns they may not feel comfortable stating aloud, such as a belief the vaccine is a profit-making scheme, or simply do not trust secular institutions. University of California at San Diego professor John Evans, who also studies the politics of evangelical Christianity, agrees, noting that no major religious leaders have opposed the vaccine. "In conservative Protestantism, you're supposed to have a religious justification for most of the things you do, so you're going to come up with one", he told Olmstead.

SMU's Allen suggests those who invoke the parable in public writing are "using it as a hammer" that serves to validate pro-vaccine beliefs rather than persuade skeptics. Curtis Chang, a Christian pro-vaccine activist, observes that a Christian can both accept the lesson of the parable yet reject the idea that the vaccine is God's vehicle for saving the faithful, since the parable focuses on the rescue efforts of individuals, while the vaccines are the creation of institutions. "This is where the Christian blind spot comes in," he says, "thinking God only works through individuals or a church." Chang nevertheless believes that the parable can be a useful conversation opener for the Christian vaccine-hesitant, as long as it comes from someone, usually a similar faithful person or pastor, the listener trusts.

== In popular culture ==
In the final scene of "Take This Sabbath Day", episode fourteen of the first season of The West Wing aired in 2000, a priest played by Karl Malden delivers the parable to the Catholic President of the United States played by Martin Sheen, who was Emmy-nominated for the episode. This version of the story uses a radio broadcast rather than a boat as the first warning about the flood. The priest claims that God sent the President "a priest, a rabbi, and a Quaker" to counsel him and his staff to issue a last-minute commutation of a convict's death sentence, when the President could not find a reason to commute it on legal or political grounds and found no help from God when he prayed for wisdom. The prisoner is executed, putting the president in the position of the man who has drowned, having ignored the aid sent to him; the episode ends with him giving confession to the priest.

In the 2006 miniseries, The Ten Commandments, Moses recounts the parable to Joshua, who was reluctant to fight for the Israelites because he argued that if God parted the Red Sea for them, he could also fight their battle.

The eighth episode of the second season of the HBO television series Boardwalk Empire is titled "Two Boats and a Lifeguard". The parable is also retold with in the episode where a man denies being saved from a life guard, a rowboat and a steamboat.

The third episode of the first season of the HBO television series The Leftovers, in 2014, was called "Two Boats and a Helicopter". The parable is not referred to in the story, but critics believed it was an allusion to it, as the episode focused on an Episcopal priest trying to keep his church in a time when mainstream religion has been in decline after the unexplained disappearance of 2 percent of the world's population. At first it seems he will as he wins enough money gambling to pay off the mortgage, but an injury suffered in a fight defending two members of a cult prevents him from making the deadline, and he loses the church. "[J]ust as the two boats/helicopter parable reminds us, sometimes we can be mistaken about the voice of God", Vox observes.

Young Rose Sandford tells the story, citing the Aaron Sorkin version from West Wing episode 14, season 1, in the movie Leave the World Behind (film) (2023) when assessing the situation the family is in.

== See also ==
- "Footprints", another popular non-Biblical parable about God's role in everyday life.
- Impact of the COVID-19 pandemic on religion
- Theodicy, the theological problem of how God permits evil and misfortune to happen
