= Trust in God and keep your powder dry =

Maxim

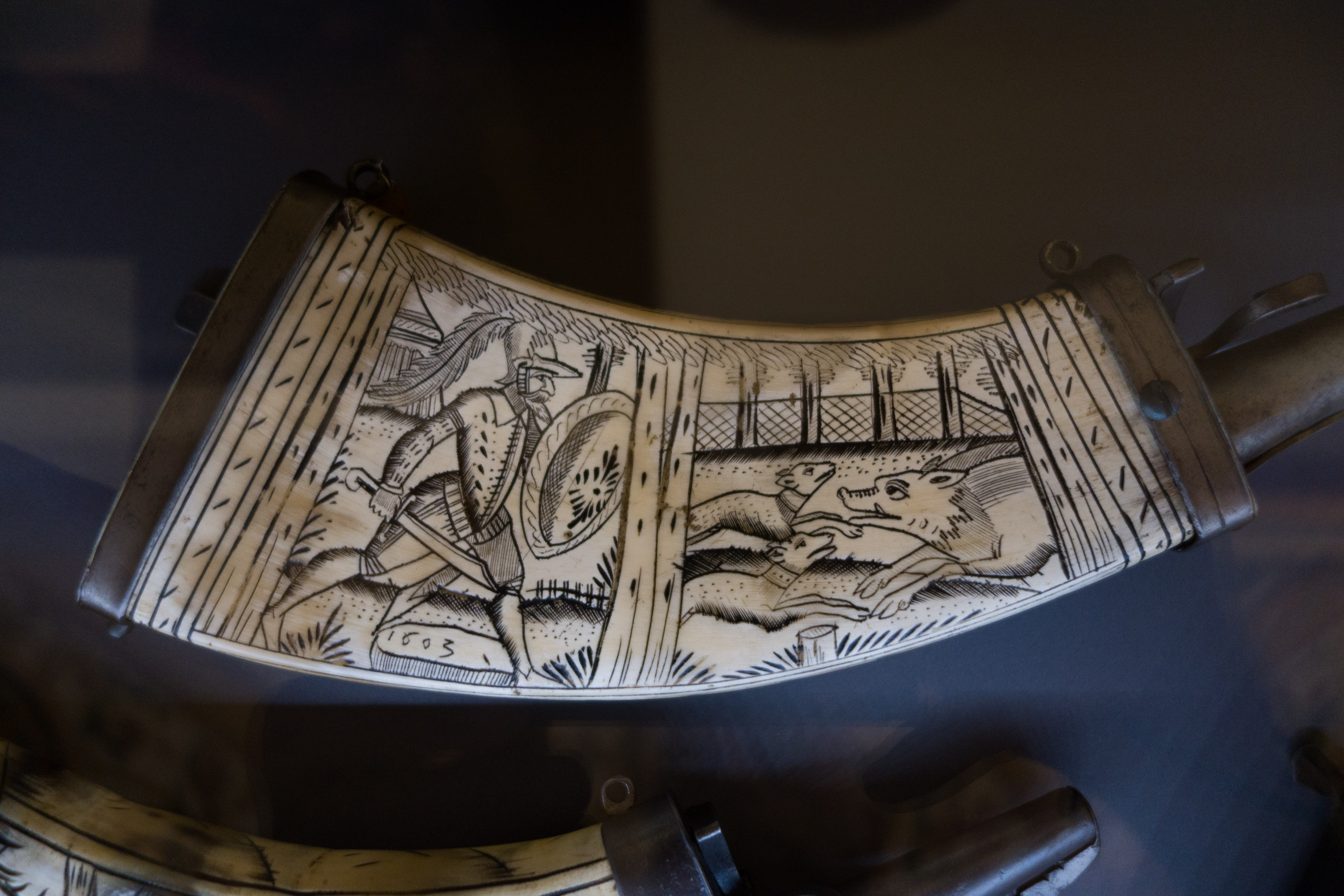
A 17th-century powder horn

"Trust in God and keep your powder dry" is a maxim attributed to Oliver Cromwell, but whose first appearance in print was in 1834 in the poem "Oliver's Advice" by William Blacker, with the words "Put your trust in God, my boys, and keep your powder dry!" The poem is a dramatic representation of Cromwell addressing his army during the invasion of Ireland. Edward Hayes, who edited the anthology in which the work first appeared, calls it a "well-authenticated anecdote of Cromwell".

== Background ==
The phrase means to "always be prepared to take action yourself if necessary". The allusion is to gunpowder which soldiers had to keep dry in order to be ready to fight when required. Bergen Evans suggested that the phrase combined piety and practicality. The book of Proverbs offers up the same idea in Proverbs 21:31, "The horse is made ready for the day of battle, but victory rests with the Lord."

The second half of the phrase is often used by itself, and forms the title of the 1945 film Keep Your Powder Dry as well as Margaret Mead's 1942 book And Keep Your Powder Dry: An Anthropologist Looks at America.

== See also ==
- Praise the Lord and Pass the Ammunition
- God helps those who help themselves
