= God helps those who help themselves =

Religious saying

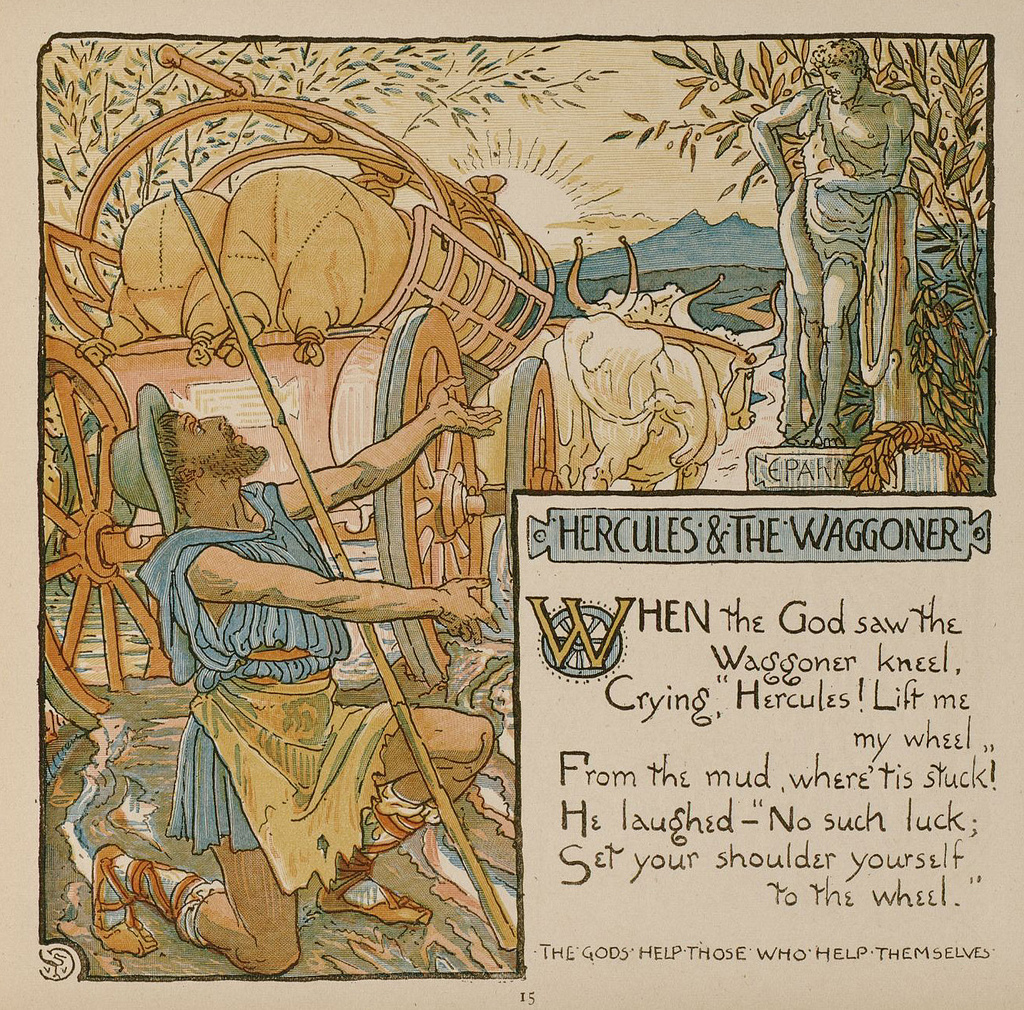
An illustration of the fable by Walter Crane in Baby's Own Aesop (1887)

The phrase "God helps those who help themselves" is a motto that emphasizes the importance of self-initiative and agency. The phrase originated in ancient Greece as "the gods help those who help themselves" and may originally have been proverbial. It is illustrated by two of Aesop's Fables and a similar sentiment is found in ancient Greek drama. Sophocles used it in the form of "No good e'er comes of leisure purposeless; And heaven ne'er helps the men who will not act", while Euripides portrays Orestes saying, "I think that Fortune watcheth o'er our lives, surer than we. But well said: he who strives will find his gods strive for him equally." Ovid's version of the phrase is "divinity helps those who dare" (audentes deus ipse iuvat).

Although it has been commonly attributed to Benjamin Franklin, the modern English wording appears earlier in Algernon Sidney's work. The phrase is often mistaken as a scriptural quote, though it is not stated in the Bible. Some Christians consider the expression contrary to the biblical message of God's grace and help for the helpless, and its denunciation of greed and selfishness. A variant of the phrase is addressed in the Quran (13:11).

== Origin ==
=== Ancient Greece ===
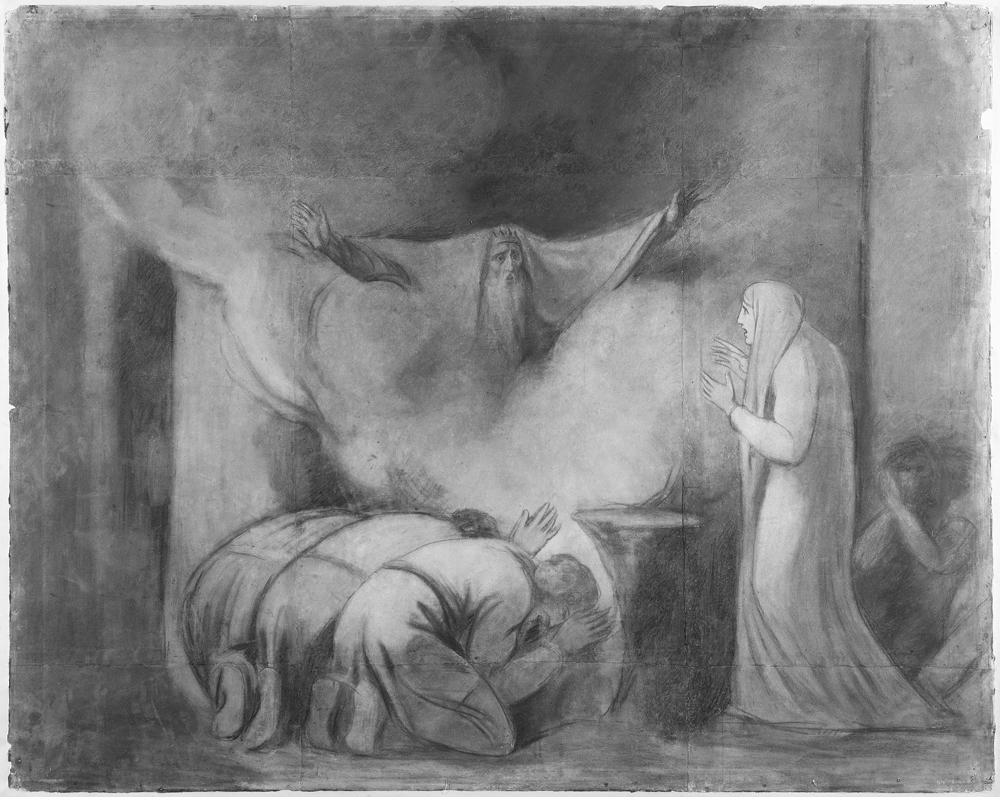
The ghost of Darius appearing to Atossa in Aeschylus's tragedy The Persians

The sentiment appears in several ancient Greek tragedies. Sophocles, in his Philoctetes (c. 409 BC), wrote, "No good e'er comes of leisure purposeless; And heaven ne'er helps the men who will not act."

Euripides, in the fragmentary Hippolytus Veiled (before 428 BC), mentions that, "Try first thyself, and after call in God; For to the worker God himself lends aid." In his Iphigeneia in Tauris, Orestes says, "I think that Fortune watcheth o'er our lives, surer than we. But well said: he who strives will find his gods strive for him equally."

A similar version of this saying "God himself helps those who dare," better translated as "divinity helps those who dare" (audentes deus ipse iuvat), comes from Ovid's Metamorphoses, 10.586. The phrase is spoken by Hippomenes when contemplating whether to enter a foot race against Atalanta for her hand in marriage. If Hippomenes were to lose, however, he would be killed. Hippomenes decides to challenge Atalanta to a race and, with the aid of Venus, Hippomenes was able to win the race.

The same concept is found in the fable of Hercules and the Wagoner, first recorded by Babrius in the 1st century AD. In it, a wagon falls into a ravine, or in later versions becomes mired, but when its driver appeals to Hercules for help, he is told to get to work himself. Aesop is also credited with a similar fable about a man who calls on the goddess Athena for help when his ship is wrecked and is advised to try swimming first. It has been conjectured that both stories were created to illustrate an already existing proverb.

The French author Jean de La Fontaine also adapted the first of these fables as Le chartier embourbé (Fables VI.18) and draws the moral Aide-toi, le ciel t'aidera (Help yourself and Heaven will help you too). A little earlier, George Herbert had included "Help thyself, and God will help thee" in his proverb collection, Jacula Prudentum (1651). But it was the English political theorist Algernon Sidney who originated the now familiar wording, "God helps those who help themselves", apparently the first exact rendering of the phrase. Benjamin Franklin later used it in his Poor Richard's Almanack (1736) and has been widely quoted.

=== Hebrew Bible ===
Several passages within the Tanakh imply a predispondence for blessing amongst those who work diligently for God, including:

- Deuteronomy 28:8 – The Lord will send a blessing on your barns and on everything you put your hand to.
- Proverbs 6:10–12 – A little sleep, a little slumber, a little folding of the hands to rest—and poverty will come on you like a bandit and scarcity like an armed man.
- Proverbs 12:11 – He who works his land will have abundant food, but he who chases fantasies lacks judgment.
- Proverbs 12:24 – Diligent hands will rule, but laziness ends in slave labor.
- Proverbs 13:4 – The sluggard craves and gets nothing, but the desires of the diligent are fully satisfied.
- Proverbs 21:31 – The horse is made ready for the day of battle, but victory rests with the Lord.

=== Talmud ===
In Ta'anit the Mishnah states:

The Gemara explains: Rav Adda bar Ahava holds in accordance with this statement, as Rabbi Yannai said: A person should never stand in a place of danger and say: A miracle will be performed for me, and I will escape unharmed, lest a miracle is not performed for him. And if you say that a miracle will be performed for him, they will deduct it from his merits.

=== New Testament ===
While the term does not appear verbatim in Christian scriptures, these passages are used to suggest an ethic of personal agency, and taking initiative:

- Colossians 3:23 – Whatever you do, work at it with all your heart, as working for the Lord, not for men.
- 1 Timothy 5:8 – If anyone does not provide for his relatives, and especially for his immediate family, he has denied the faith and is worse than an unbeliever.
- James 2:26 – For as the body without the spirit is dead, so faith without works is dead also.

Reliance upon God is strongly implied in addition to working hard.

There is also a relationship to the Parable of the Faithful Servant, and the Parable of the Ten Virgins, which has a similar eschatological theme: be prepared for the day of reckoning.

Conversely with agency, in other instances the Bible emphasises reliance on God and examples of Jesus serving or healing those who lacked the ability to help themselves, implying that self-reliance and reliance on God are complementary (See Mark 6:34; Mark 1:30–31; and Mark 10:46–52.)

=== Islamic texts ===
A passage with similar sentiments can be found in the Quran:

Indeed Allah will not change the conditions of a population until they change what is in themselves.

— Qur'an 13:11

Surely Allah is with those who shun evil and who do good deeds

— The Quran 16:128 Qur'an 16:128

Is there any reward for goodness except goodness?

— The Quran 16:128 Qur'an 55:60

It has a different meaning in that it implies that help in oneself is a prerequisite for expecting the help of God. An Arab proverb and reported saying of the Islamic prophet Muhammad with a similar meaning is "Trust in God But Tie Your Camel". According to Tirmidhi, one day Muhammad noticed a Bedouin leaving his camel without tying it. He asked the Bedouin, "Why don't you tie down your camel?" The Bedouin answered, "I placed my trust in Allah." At that, Muhammad said, "Tie your camel and place your trust in Allah."

=== Chinese idiom ===
The Chinese idiom 天道酬勤 (pinyin: tiān dào choú qín) also expresses a similar meaning, that "Heaven rewards the diligent".

=== Other historical uses ===
The French society Aide-toi, le ciel t'aidera (Help yourself and Heaven will help you too) played an important role in bringing about the July Revolution of 1830 in France.

The Canadian society Aide-toi, le Ciel t'aidera, founded by Louis-Victor Sicotte, is credited with introducing the celebration of Saint-Jean-Baptiste Day for French Canadians.

Aide-toi et Dieu t'aidera (Help yourself, and God will help you) was the motto on the ship's wheel of the famous UK-built Confederate sea raider CSS Alabama, captained by Raphael Semmes during the American Civil War.

== Contemporary views and controversy ==
The belief that this is a phrase that occurs in the Bible, or is even one of the Ten Commandments, is common in the United States. The beliefs of Americans regarding this phrase and the Bible have been studied by Christian demographer and pollster George Barna. To the statement "The Bible teaches that God helps those who help themselves", across a series of polls, 53% of Americans agree strongly, 22% agree somewhat, 7% disagree somewhat, 14% disagree strongly, and 5% stated they don't know. A poll in the late 1990s showed the majority (81%) believe the concept is taught by the Bible, another stating 82%, with "born-again" Christians less (68%) likely to agree than non "born-again" Christians (81%). Despite not appearing in the Bible, the phrase topped a poll of the most widely known Bible verses. Five percent of American teenagers said they believed that it was the central message of the Bible.

Barna sees this as evidence of Americans' growing unfamiliarity with the Bible and believes that it reflects a shift to values conflicting with the doctrine of Grace in Christianity and "suggests a spiritual self-reliance inconsistent with Christianity". Christian minister Erwin Lutzer argues there is some support for this saying in the Bible (2 Thessalonians 3:10, James 4:8); however, much more often God helps those who cannot help themselves, which is what grace is about (the parable of the Pharisee and the Publican, Ephesians 2:4–5, Romans 4:4–5). The statement is often criticised as espousing a Semi-Pelagian model of salvation, which most Christians denounce as heresy.

== See also ==
- Trust in God and keep your powder dry, a similar exhortation from Oliver Cromwell to his troops
  - Praise the Lord and Pass the Ammunition, a similar exhortation in World War II
- Parable of the drowning man, modern story often told with this as its moral
- Protestant work ethic – Social-theologic concept
- Prosperity theology – Material wealth-based Protestant belief
