= Hercules and the Wagoner =

Aesop's fable

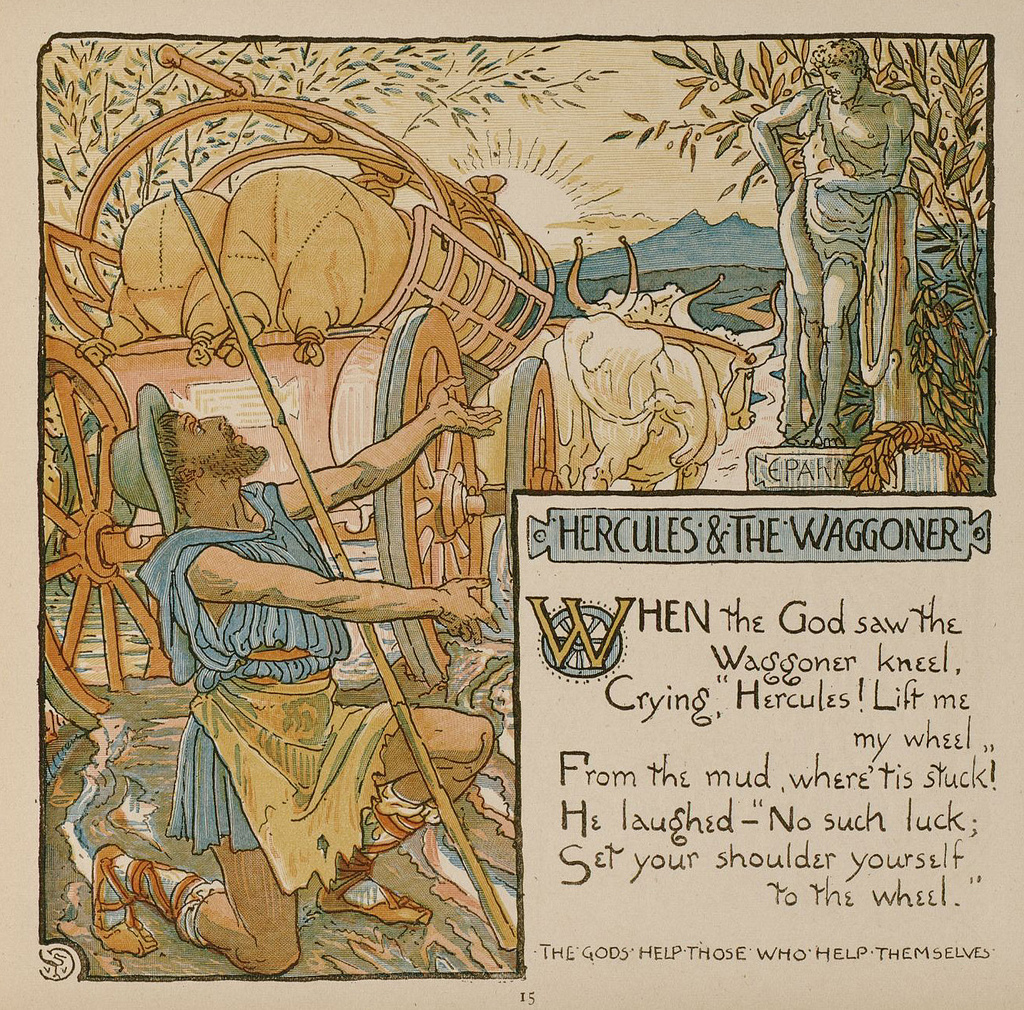
An illustration of the fable by Walter Crane in Baby's Own Aesop (1887)

Hercules and the Wagoner or Hercules and the Carter is a fable credited to Aesop. It is associated with the proverb "God helps those who help themselves", variations on which are found in other ancient Greek authors.

== The Greek proverb ==
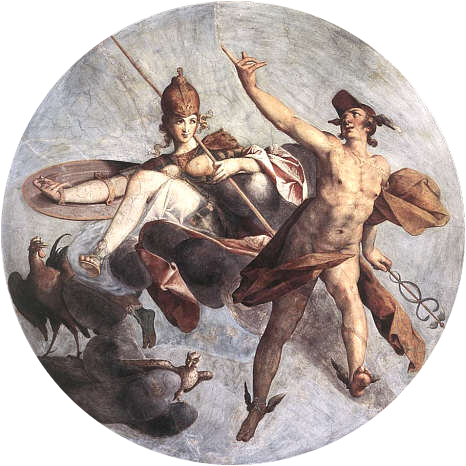
"Try first thyself, and after call the gods", Hermes and Athena in a Prague Castle fresco

A number of the fables credited to Aesop seem to have been created to illustrate already existing proverbs. The tale of Herakles and the Cowherd, first recorded by Babrius towards the end of the 1st century CE, is one of these. The rustic's cart falls into a ravine and he calls on the deified strongman for help, only to be advised by a voice from Heaven to put his own shoulder to the wheel first. In a variant recorded by the near contemporary Zenobius an ass founders in the mud, while in the later Latin of Avianus it is a cart drawn by oxen that gets stuck there. The fable appears as number 291 in the Perry Index. Another fable of the same tendency is numbered 30 in that index. It tells of a man who is shipwrecked and calls on the goddess Athena for help; he is advised by another to try swimming ('moving his arms') as well (Greek: "σὺν Ἀθηνᾷ καὶ σὺ χεῖρας κίνει").

Evidence that the advice on which they close is old and probably of proverbial origin is provided by its appearance in ancient Greek tragedies, of which only fragments now remain. In the Philoctetes (c. 409 BCE) of Sophocles appear the lines, "No good e'er comes of leisure purposeless; And heaven ne'er helps the men who will not act." And in the Hippolytus (428 BCE) of Euripides there is the more direct, "Try first thyself, and after call in God; For to the worker God himself lends aid."

== Later applications ==
When the theme was taken up in the Renaissance, it was the variant of the laden ass that slips in the mire that appeared earlier on in Guillaume La Perrière's emblem book, Le theatre des bons engins (1544) . Though prayer to God is piously recommended in the accompanying poem,

Yet while to Him you carry your trust,
Let your own hands tarry not at first.

Not long after, Gabriele Faerno included the story of Hercules and the Wagoner in his influential collection of Latin poems based on Aesop's fables that was published in 1563. Then in England Francis Barlow provided versions in English verse and Latin prose to accompany the illustration in his 1666 collection of the fables under the title "The Clown and the Cart". Two years later, a French version appeared in La Fontaine's Fables titled "The Mired Carter" (Le chartier embourbé, VI.18). The variation in this telling is that the god suggests various things that the carter should do until, to his surprise, he finds that the cart is freed. The first translation of this version was made by Charles Denis in 1754, and there he follows La Fontaine in incorporating the Classical proverb as the moral on which it ends: "First help thyself, and Heaven will do the rest."

The English idiomatic expression 'to set (or put) one's shoulder to the wheel' derived at an earlier date from the condition given the carter before he could expect divine help. Denis' translation apart, however, the link with the proverb "God helps those who help themselves" was slow to be taken up in English sources, even though that wording had emerged by the end of the 17th century. It was not there in Samuel Croxall's long 'application' at the end of his version, in which he stated that to neglect the necessity of self-help is 'blasphemy', that it is 'a great sin for a man to fail in his trade or occupation by running often to prayers', and that 'the man who is virtuously and honestly engaged is actually serving God all the while'. A century after the first appearance of his collection, the fables were reused with new commentaries in Aesop's fables: accompanied by many hundred proverbs & moral maxims suited to the subject of each fable (Dublin 1821). There it is titled "The Farmer and the Carter" and headed with the maxim 'If you will obtain, you must attempt'. At the end, a Biblical parallel is suggested with 'The soul of the sluggard desireth and hath nothing' from the Book of Proverbs (13.4). Later in that century, George Fyler Townsend preferred to end his new translation with the pithy 'Self-help is the best help'.
