= Harold Blacker =

British judge

Harold Alfred Cecil Blacker
- Born: 15 August 1889
- Died: 18 July 1944 (aged 54)
- Education: Queens' College, Cambridge
- Occupation: Judge
- Spouse: Barbara Graeme Leask (m. 1922)
- Children: Nina Graeme Blacker

Harold Alfred Cecil Blacker (15 August 1889 – 18 July 1944), styled Mr Justice Blacker, was a Puisne Judge in the High Court of Judicature, Lahore.

== Early years ==
Born in Fulham on 15 August 1889, Harold Blacker was the son of Major Latham Charles Miller Blacker and his wife, Emily Violet Mattei ("Contessa Emilia Mattei").

He was educated at Charterhouse (1903-1905), Bedford School (1905-1908), and at Queens' College, Cambridge, graduating as a Bachelor of Arts in 1911.

He joined the Indian Civil Service, and left England for India, on 20 October 1914. His first appointment was Assistant Commissioner in Sialkot.

== Military Officer ==
He was commissioned as a Second Lieutenant in the 1st Punjab Volunteer Rifles, "to fill an existing vacancy", on 1 April 1915. Given permission to commence active service, he was appointed a second lieutenant in the Indian Army Reserve of Officers [I.A.R.O.] on 23 August 1917, and was posted as an Assistant Recruiting Officer to Ferozepur. He was promoted on 1 November 1917 to the rank of temporary captain, but without the pay and allowances of that rank, while employed as Assistant Recruiting Officer. He was released from full-time military service, to resume civil employment on 13 December 1918. He formally relinquished his commission in the I.A.R.O. and was granted the rank of captain, with effect from 1 May 1922.

== Resumption of Indian Civil Service career ==
In December 1918, Blacker resumed his ICS career as Assistant Commissioner in Gurdaspur. He served on several other stations, before being appointed Political Assistant, and Commandant of the Border Military Police in Dera Ghazi Khan, in February 1920. Then, in November, 1922, he commenced duties as Registrar of the High Court of Judicature at Lahore. Thereafter he served several times as a District and Sessions Judge in Lahore.

== Judicial Appointments ==
In 1930, Blacker was appointed as President of a Special Tribunal constituted under the Criminal Procedure (Punjab Amendment) Act, 1930 (Punjab Act IV of 1930). The Tribunal – the so-called "Punjab Conspiracy Case Tribunal" – was established to try a large number of freedom fighters involved in the Atshi Chakkar group ("the Ring of Fire", formed in June 1930), charged with indulging in "terrorist activities to throw off the British power". It comprised three Commissioners (judges): Blacker (President of the Tribunal); Rai Bahadur Ganga Ram Soni; and Mr Mohammed Sleem. The case was prosecuted by Pandit Jwala Parshad. Sessions, held in the Central Jail in Lahore, commenced in December 1930:

"There sat the President of the Tribunal, Mr. H.A.C. Blacker, a man of calm observation with nothing conspicuous about him. He had been looking unobtrusively but continuously towards us since the time we were produced in the court. The youngest of the judges, Mr. Sleem, a well-known lawyer from Lahore, sat to the left of the President. He looked smart and vivacious. … His smiling self-confident attitude put in unfavourable contrast the bearing of the third and the oldest of the judges, Rai Bahadur Ganga Ram Soni. He was a retired Sessions Judge of about seventy with an austere face, gaunt and thin frame and a shaky head."

"[The] District and Sessions Judge of Lahore, Mr. Blacker (a civilian) […] later elevated to the High Court Bench […] was trying one of the famous conspiracy cases. As the trial was taking too long to finish, the British Governor wrote to him requesting an expeditious disposal of the case. The judge promptly issued a notice to the Governor requiring his presence the next day to answer a charge of contempt. And the Governor did present himself with a host of legal advisers and officials. He tendered an unconditional and unqualified apology."

The Tribunal delivered judgment, and the tribunal was wound up, on 13 December 1933. Two of the accused were sentenced to death, three to transportation for life, and 12 to rigorous imprisonment for terms ranging from two to seven years. Five were acquitted.

"[Defence counsel] was meanwhile busy with the judges who were finishing their business that day. He had requested them to recommend 'B' class treatment for us and to instruct the jail authorities to let us remain in the Lahore Jail till the decision of our appeal. The judges, while making both the recommendations, remarked, 'All these are well-behaved young men belonging to decent families and deserve better status!'"

Blacker was appointed as an Additional Judge in the High Court at Lahore in October 1934, but resumed duty as Registrar of the court in October, 1935. He sat as an acting member of the court in 1936 and 1937, before - on 23 December 1937 - being given a permanent appointment as Puisne Judge in the High Court of Judicature at Lahore.

Mr Justice Blacker died of a cerebral haemorrhage in Murree on 18 July 1944.

== Family ==
Blacker was married on 3 October 1922, in St Saviour's Church in Eastbourne to Barbara Graeme Leask, daughter of Dr. John Thomas Leask and his wife, Alice Maud Trute. They had one daughter, Nina Graeme Blacker.
