= Sarah Blacker =

American singer-songwriter (born 1983)

- Birth name: Sarah Emily Blacker
- Born: January 11, 1983 (age 42)
- Origin: Boston, Massachusetts, U.S.
- Genres: Indie pop
- Years active: 2009–present
- Website: www.sarahblacker.com

Sarah Blacker (born January 11, 1983) is an American singer-songwriter from Boston, Massachusetts.

== History ==
Raised in Wellesley, Massachusetts, Sarah Blacker graduated from Wellesley High School before completing a degree at the Berklee College of Music. A qualified music therapist as well as a classically trained singer, she worked full-time in music therapy upon graduating – from which she took a short break to record her first album, but has since returned to on a part-time basis.

"The Only Way Out is Through" was Blacker's first album. Co-produced with Rob Loyot, the album was released in 2009. This was followed in 2011 with Come What May, her second album. Primarily recorded at 37’ Productions Studio, much of the album was produced by Sean McLaughlin, who also played bass on the tracks. Blacker viewed the album as being more true to her own view of how the album should sound than "The Only Way Out is Through", in part because she felt that she had accepted more direction in the studio on her first album. Reviews were positive, with Aimsel Ponti describing her voice as "radiant", while Matt Lambert in Performer Magazine described her voice on the album as "enchanting".

This was followed with a self-published EP, Perfectly Imperfect. In late 2012, Blacker started a successful PledgeMusic campaign to raise funds to release her third studio album.

In 2013, she won the title of 'Female Performer of the Year' in the New England Music Awards and was nominated for the Boston Music Awards in the Singer/Songwriter of the Year category, as well as being nominated in the same category for the annual Limelight Magazine awards. The same year saw one of her songs, "Smell of Caramel", featured in the intro of Season 6, Episode 9 of the MTV series, Jersey Shore. In 2013 she was once again nominated for the Limelight awards, only this time in the best music video category.

In 2015, Blacker released her third studio album, In Waves via ILS Music / Caroline / Universal Music Group.

== Discography ==
- The Only Way Out is Through (2009)
- Come What May (2011)
- Precious Little Things - EP (2012)
- In Waves (2015)
