= David Blacker =

Sri Lankan author

David Blacker is a Sri Lankan author.

In the early 1990s, as a 19-year-old, Blacker served in the 6th Sri Lanka Sinha Regiment of the Sri Lanka Army at Elephant Pass, seeing action in the regiment's heroic defense of the base. In 2001, after being wounded in battle, he went to Europe and took a part-time designing job. Blacker began to write in his spare time, and soon produced A Cause Untrue, a tale of Sri Lankan war. Blacker said that while personal experience formed the basis of the novel, the plot was entirely fabricated.

In 2004 the novel in manuscript form was short-listed for the Gratiaen Prize, which led to its publication in 2005. Subsequently, the book won Best Novel at the 2006 State Literary Awards and was on the 2007 long list for the International Dublin Literary Award.

Blacker's blog, the Blacklight Arrow, was one of the most popular Sri Lankan websites during the war, and Dr Dayan Jayatillake, Sri Lanka's former permanent representative to the UN in Geneva is quoted as saying “The Blacklight Arrow was way ahead in analysing and projecting the war as it unfurled this time. I have read and met commentators on military and strategic/security affairs from the UK, US, India, Russia and Israel and this guy Blacker is world class, and would be recognised as such except he’s too damn lazy to write. His knowledge of world military history is enormous. As a member of the International Expert Panel of Security Index, the top journal of security studies out of Moscow, I can safely say I know of no Sri Lankan or Sri Lankan-born analyst of military affairs who is better.”

Articles from Blacker's blog have also been reproduced in the Times of India and Sri Lanka's Sunday Island.

Blacker lives in Sri Lanka and is a creative director and works in advertising.
