= Maxwell Blacker =

English cricketer and clergyman

Personal information
- Full name: Maxwell Julius Blacker
- Born: 6 June 1822; Marylebone, Middlesex, England
- Died: 11 June 1888 (aged 66); Pimlico, Westminster, England
- Batting: Unknown

Domestic team information
- Years: Team
- 1841: Oxford University

Career statistics
Competition	First-class
Matches	1
Runs scored	28
Batting average	28.00
100s/50s	–/–
Top score	23
Catches/stumpings	–/–
- Source: Cricinfo, 22 January 2020

Maxwell Julius Blacker (6 June 1822 — 11 June 1888) was an English first-class cricketer and clergyman.

The son of Valentine Blacker, he was born in June 1822 at Marylebone. He was educated at Eton College, before going up to Merton College, Oxford. While studying at Oxford, he made a single appearance in first-class cricket for Oxford University against the Marylebone Cricket Club at Lord's in 1841. Batting twice in the match, he ended Oxford's first-innings of 157 all out unbeaten on 5, while in their second-innings he was dismissed for 23 runs by Henry Walker.

Upon graduating from Oxford he took holy orders in 1848, taking his first ecclesiastical post as curate of North Cove, Suffolk from 1848–49. He moved to Brussels in 1850, where he was a chaplain until 1856, marrying Emily Georgina Daveney at Antwerp during his first year in Belgium. Returning to England, he took up the post of curate at St Mary-the-Less in Lambeth in 1859, before becoming the chaplain of St Peter’s Home, Brompton from 1863–68. Blacker died at Pimlico in June 1888.
