= Thetis Blacker =

English painter and singer

- Born: 13 December 1927; Holmbury St Mary, Surrey, England
- Died: 18 December 2006 (aged 79); Bramley, Surrey, England
- Education: Chelsea School of Art
- Known for: Painting, batik
- Notable work: Apocalypse, Arbor Cosmica, A Bestiary of Mythical Creatures, The Creation, and Search for the Simurgh
- Patrons: Henry Dyson

Ann Thetis Blacker (13 December 1927 – 18 December 2006) was an English painter and singer. She was noted for her richly coloured pictures, especially using the batik wax-resist fabric dyeing process.

Blacker was born in Holmbury St Mary, Surrey, England. She was the daughter of Carlos Paton Blacker, a psychiatrist, and granddaughter of Carlos Blacker, a friend of Oscar Wilde. Blacker intended to be a singer and studied with the German mezzo-soprano singer Elena Gerhardt in London. She appeared in the chorus at Glyndebourne opera in the 1950s and sang the role of "Mother Goose" in The Rake's Progress by Igor Stravinsky. When her singing career was cut short by vocal issues in the mid-1950s, Blacker turned her focus to painting. She studied at the Chelsea School of Art in London and was taught by the wife of the artist Leonard Campbell Taylor, Brenda Moore.

In 1970, Blacker became a Churchill Fellow and visited India, Indonesia, Iran, Malaysia, Singapore, and Thailand. She worked at the Batik Research Institute in Yogyakarta, Indonesia. She went on to visit Bali and Peru, influencing her style of brightly coloured symbolic pictures using batik dyed fabric. A number of cathedrals and churches in the United Kingdom, the rest of Europe, and the United States commissioned her work including a series of five major pieces based on mythical themes: Apocalypse (at St Andrew's House), Arbor Cosmica, A Bestiary of Mythical Creatures, The Creation (at Winchester Cathedral), and Search for the Simurgh.

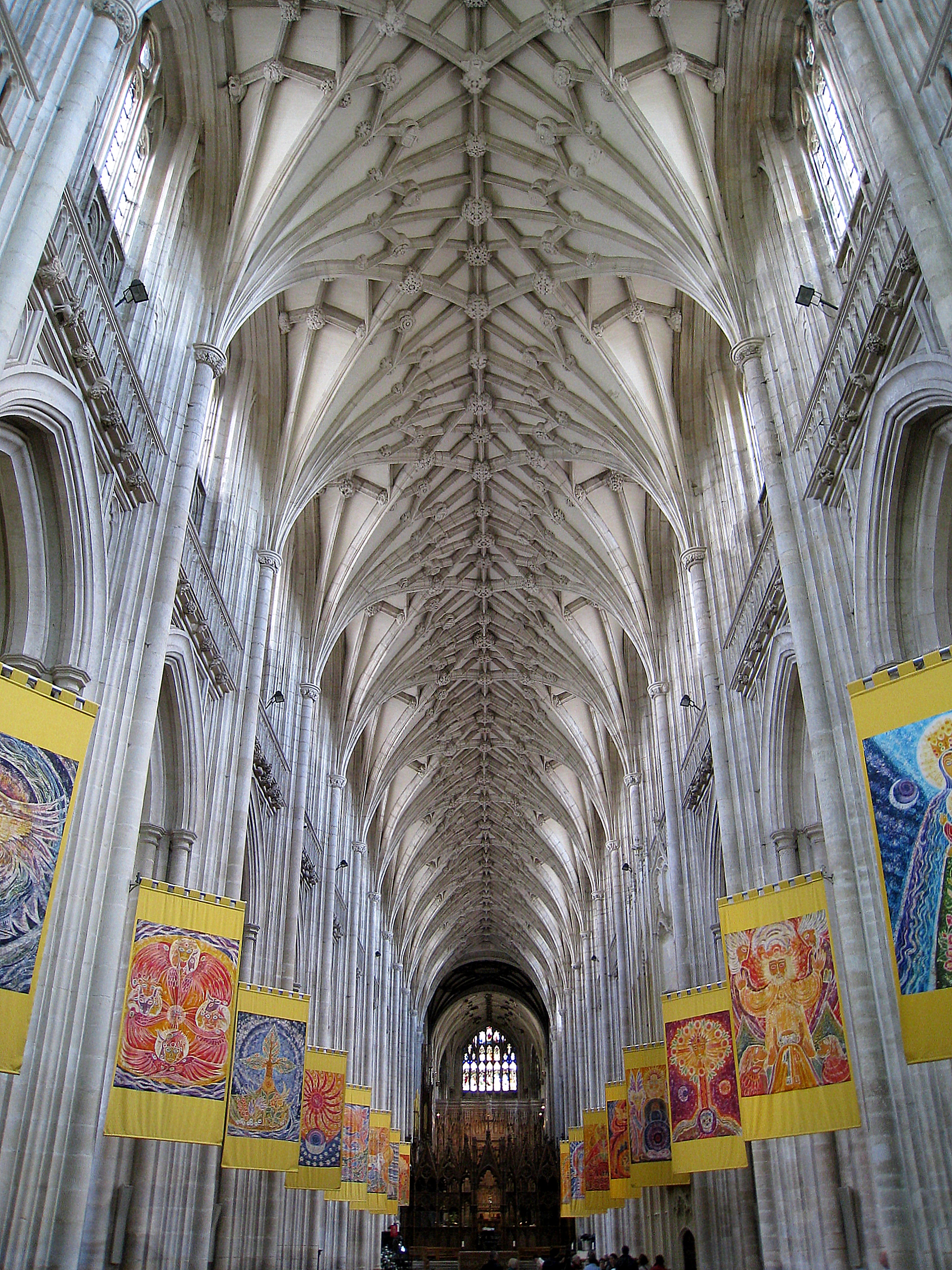
The Nave, Winchester Cathedral with batik festival banners by Thetis Blacker

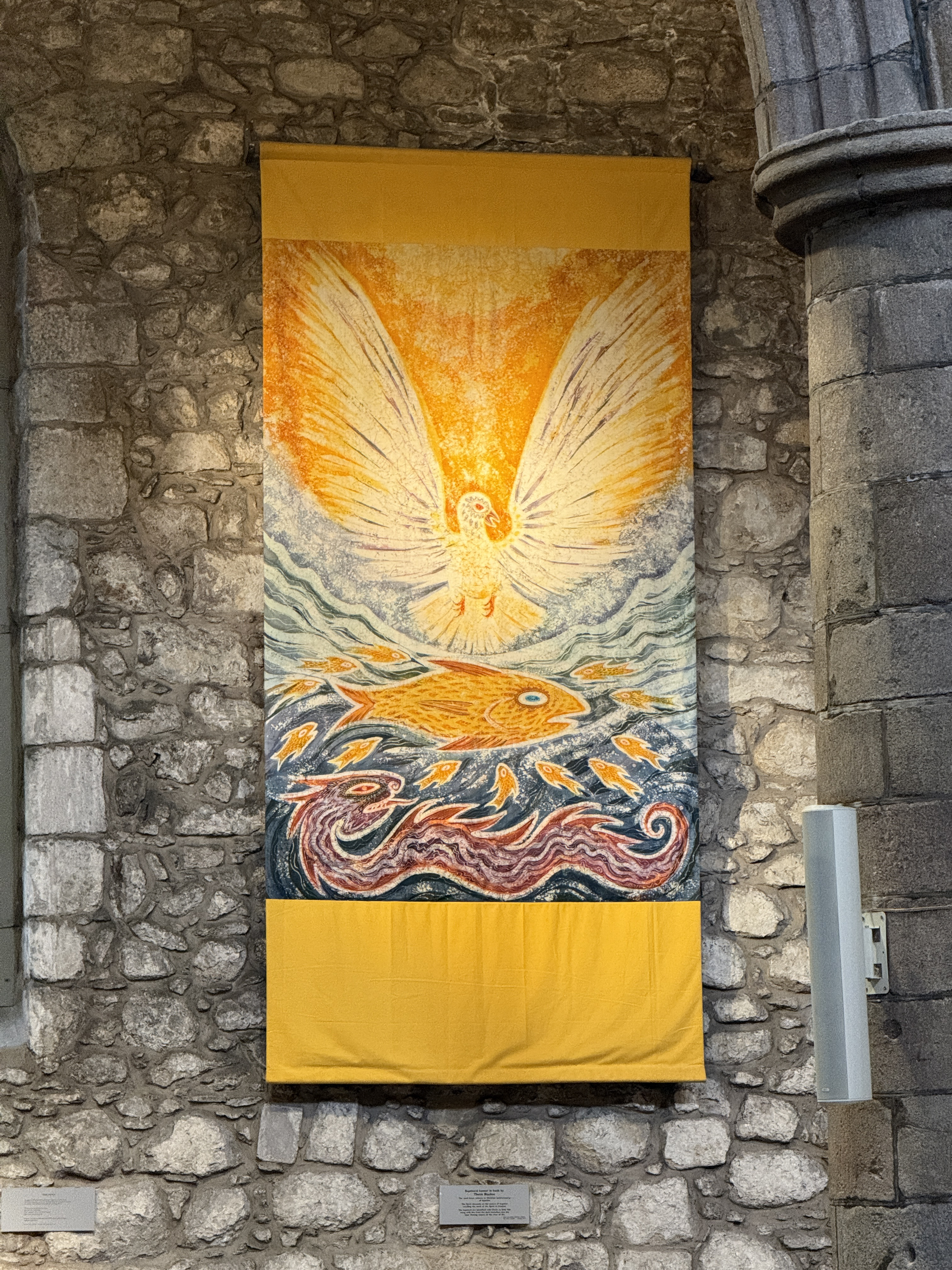
St Machar's Cathedral

In 1993 she provided the illustrations for The Birds Who Flew Beyond Time written by Anne Baring.

Blacker received commissions for artworks at:

- St Machar's Cathedral, Aberdeen (1991) a baptismal banner
- St George's Chapel, Windsor (1997), with an exhibition there in 2000;
- St Albans Abbey;
- Three works in Grey College Chapel at the University of Durham (The Creation of Darkness and Light, Imago Aquarium, and Imago Lucis);
- A Phoenix in the dining hall of Grey College, Durham (2000);
- Banners of St Cuthbert and St Oswald at Durham Cathedral (2001).

Blacker's work was exhibited at Glyndebourne in 2005. Her dealer was Henry Dyson and she died in Bramley, Surrey in 2006.
