= Jim Blacker =

English footballer

Personal information
- Full name: James Arthur Blacker
- Date of birth: 10 August 1945 (age 81)
- Place of birth: Leeds, England
- Position: Full back

Youth career
- Middleton Parkside

Senior career*
Years	Team	Apps	(Gls)
1962–1965	Bradford City	21	(0)
Total		21	(0)
- * Club domestic league appearances and goals

James Arthur Blacker (born 10 August 1945) is an English former professional footballer who played as a full back.

== Career ==
Born in Leeds, Blacker played for Middleton Parkside and Bradford City. For Bradford City, he made 21 appearances in the Football League.

== Sources ==
- Frost, Terry (1988). Bradford City A Complete Record 1903-1988. Breedon Books Sport. ISBN 0-907969-38-0.
