= Carmen Blacker =

British Japanologist

Carmen Blacker OBE FBA
- Blacker in 1961
- Born: 13 July 1924; Kensington, London, England
- Died: 13 July 2009 (aged 85); Cambridge, England
- Education: School of Oriental and African Studies; Somerville College, Oxford
- Spouse: Michael Loewe (m. 2002)

Carmen Blacker OBE FBA (13 July 1924 – 13 July 2009) was a British Japanologist. She was a lecturer in Japanese at the University of Cambridge.

== Life ==
Blacker was born in Kensington in 1924. Her parents were Carlos Paton Blacker and Helen Maud (born Pilkington).

By the age of 12 she had a book about Japanese grammar. In 1942 she began attending the School of Oriental and African Studies (SOAS) in London, from where she was recruited by the codebreakers at the Government Code and Cypher School, Bletchley Park. She left because she saw no benefit in the work, for which she was paid two pounds a week because she was a young woman. She met the Orientalist and sinologist Arthur Waley at Bletchley Park, and he inspired her to study Chinese in her spare time. In 1944 she arranged to receive lessons in Japanese from Major General Francis S. G. Piggott.

After graduating from SOAS in 1947 she began her studies at Somerville College, Oxford. In 1952 she began visiting Japan. In 1955 she was appointed an assistant lecturer at the University of Cambridge and in 1958 she became University Lecturer in Japanese Studies. She visited Japan in the summer vacations to study Buddhism, staying with Osaragi Jiro in Kamakura, where she practised zazen. She also became interested in shugendō. Her book The Catalpa Bow: A Study of Shamanistic Practices in Japan (1975) was a result of these visits and was partly based on her extensive fieldwork, during which she participated in Kaihōgyō and ascetic life in Japan.

Blacker was elected a Fellow of the British Academy in 1989. She was awarded the Minakata Kumagusu Prize in 1998.

Blacker was a member of the Folklore Society, and served as its President from 1982 to 1984. As President she delivered two addresses: “The Exiled Warrior: The Legend and its Ramifications in Japan” and “Minakata Kumagusu: A Neglected Japanese Genius”.

She married her longtime partner, the Chinese scholar Michael Loewe, in 2002. She had met Loewe at Bletchley Park.

Blacker died in a nursing home in Cambridge on 13 July 2009, her 85th birthday.

== Works ==
- The Japanese Enlightenment: A Study of the Writings of Fukuzawa Yukichi, 1964
- The Catalpa Bow: A Study of Shamanistic Practices in Japan, three editions 1975, 1986, 1999
- Ancient Cosmologies, 1975
- Divination and Oracles, 1981
- Collected Writings of Carmen Blacker, 2000.
- Women and Tradition: A Neglected Group of Folklorists, 2000 (with H. R. Ellis Davidson)
- The Straw Sandal, translation of a novel by Santō Kyōden, 2008

== Collection of essays about Blacker's life and work ==
Carmen Blacker, Scholar of Japanese Religion, Myth and Folklore: Writings and Reflections, edited by Hugh Cortazzi, Folkestone, Kent: Renaissance Books, 2017 (since made an imprint of Amsterdam University Press).
