= Carlos Blacker =

British psychiatrist (1895–1975)

Carlos Paton ('C.P.') Blacker
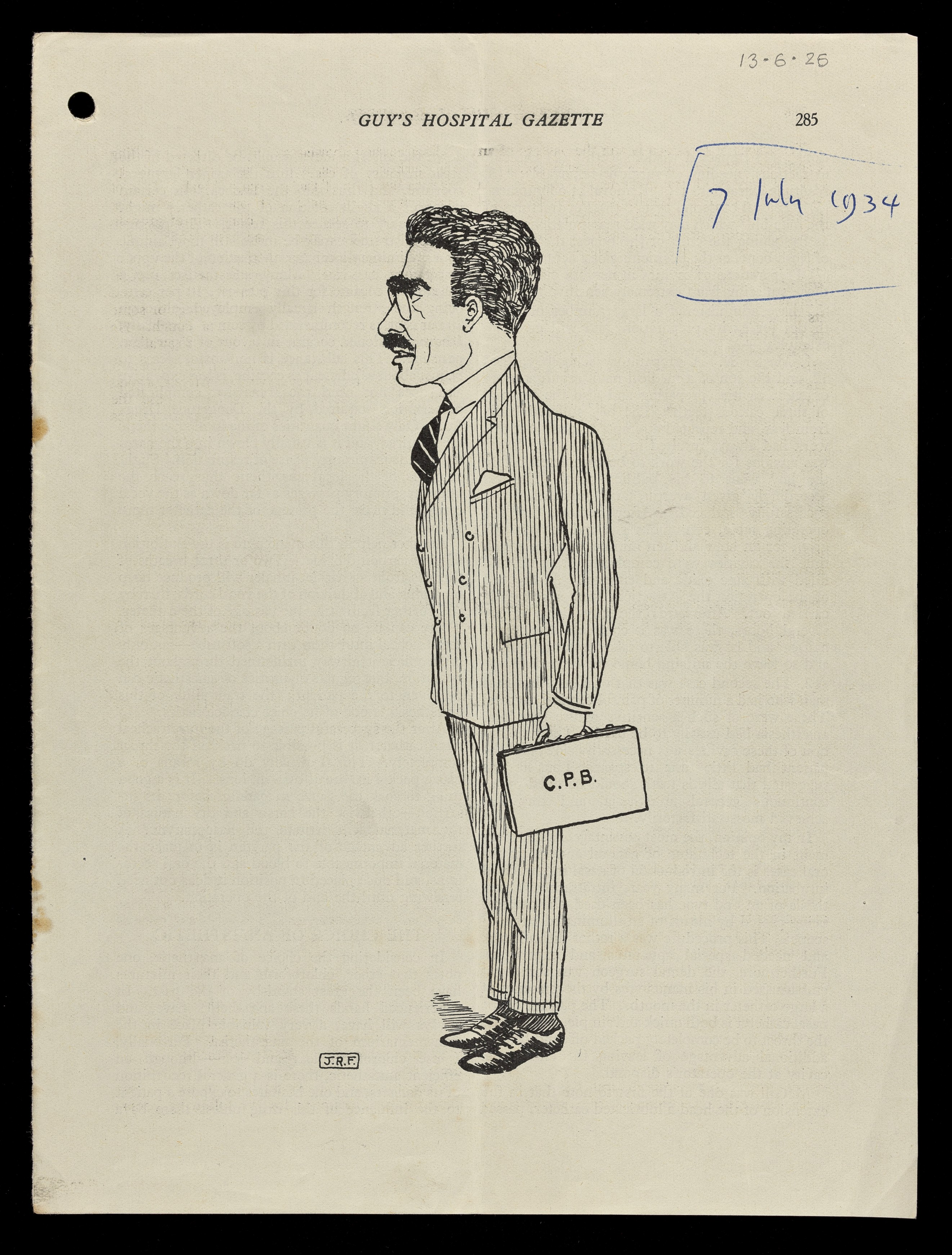
- Cartoon of Carlos Paton Blacker
- Born: 8 December 1895; Paris, France
- Died: 21 April 1975
- Education: Eton College; Balliol College, Oxford
- Spouse: Helen Maud Pilkington
- Children: Carmen Blacker, Ann Thetis Blacker
- Awards: Galton Medal of the Eugenics Society
- Scientific career
- Fields: Family planning, Eugenics
- Workplaces: Guy's Hospital, Maudsley Hospital

Carlos Paton Blacker MC GM FRCP (8 December 1895 – 21 April 1975), also known as C. P. Blacker, was an eminent war hero, psychiatrist and eugenicist who worked with R.A. Fisher and Lionel Penrose. He was the elder son of Carlos Blacker (c.1859-1928) and his wife Caroline (`Carrie`) nee Frost.

== Early life ==
Blacker was educated at Eton and Oxford where he attained distinction in biology under the tutelage of Julian Huxley. He served with the Coldstream Guards during World War I, was twice mentioned in dispatches, and was awarded the Military Cross for action in which he was involved on 15 September 1916. Twelve months previously he had lost his only sibling, a brother Robin, at Loos. Robin had also been an officer in the Coldstream Guards. C. P. felt that war was dysgenic because it killed people who tended to be above the physical average and deterred thoughtful people from parenthood. He was deeply shaken by his war experience and, in coming to terms with it, with the loss of his brother and many of his contemporaries, acknowledged a debt to Freud's writings, which stimulated in him an interest in psychiatry.

Qualifying in medicine in 1925, Blacker became a registrar in Guy's Hospital's psychiatric department for three years and continued his study at the Maudsley Hospital. He later became a part-time member of its teaching staff and was later the first chairman of the newly established Simon Population Trust.

In 1943, on active service, Blacker was awarded the George Medal. The official citation read:

A corporal had walked into a minefield and was killed. A Guards officer and a sergeant who had laid the mines at that point walked into the minefield to bring back the corporal's body. Captain Blacker warned them of the risk, but the sergeant, confident that he knew the positions of the mines, went on with the officer. The sergeant was killed when he stepped on a mine and the officer was seriously wounded. With no knowledge of the mine pattern and no one to help, Captain Blacker went immediately to the rescue of the wounded officer. The officer was saved and recovered from his wounds.

From 1931 to 1952, Blacker was secretary of the Eugenics Society and he gave it a new focus on birth control and population planning. His appointment as Secretary was "not without some misgivings of [Leonard] Darwin, its chairman. The differences in outlook, aspirations and in judgement of these two men during their partnership in office in the Eugenics Society led to tensions which have been ably traced by Richard Soloway. Two prominent issues here were Darwin's reluctance to endorse Blacker's deep-rooted conviction that research and provision of contraception should be a major feature in the Eugenic Society's strategy to reduce the fecundity of the lower, less able classes and his disagreement with Blacker's aspiration to redirect more of the Eugenic Society's effort from education and propaganda to research and promotion of contraception."

Carmen Blacker (1924-2009), a scholar in the Japanese language and Ann Thetis Blacker (1927–2006), the painter and singer, were daughters of Carlos Blacker.

== Sources ==
- Carlos Paton Blacker's personal papers archive is available for study at the Wellcome Collection (some of the material is digitised and digitally accessible via the website).
