= Kate Blacker =

British artist (born 1955)

Kate Blacker (born 1955) is a British artist.

Kate Blacker studied at the Camberwell School of Art and the Royal College of Art.

Her work is in the permanent collection of the Tate Gallery.
