= William Blacker =

British Army officer (1777–1855)

- Born: 1 September 1777; Armagh, Kingdom of Ireland
- Died: 25 November 1855 (aged 78); County Armagh, Ireland
- Burial place: Old Seagoe Cemetery
- Spouse: Anna Ferguson (m. 1810)
- Relatives: Valentine Blacker; George Hill (uncle); Cecil Blacker
- Military career
- Branch: Army
- Service years: 1801–
- Rank: Lieutenant Colonel
- Units: 60th Regiment, 1801; Armagh Militia; Seagoe Corps of Yeomanry

Lieutenant Colonel William Blacker (1 September 1777 – 25 November 1855) was an officer in the Armagh Militia and Seagoe Corps of Yeomanry, Commissioner of the Treasury of Ireland and author. His published work is sometimes attributed under the names Fitz Stewart or Colonel Blacker.

== Life and career ==
Born in Carrickblacker House, in the Oneilland East barony in County Armagh, he entered Trinity College Dublin in the 1790s. Blacker was a participant at the Battle of the Diamond. There, Blacker became one of the original members of the Orange Institution. After earning his degree, Blacker obtained a commission in the 60th Regiment of Foot, then serving in the West Indies, on 3 July 1801, but poor health compelled him to return home. Joining the Armagh Militia, he was promoted to the rank of major on 7 February 1806, and to his final rank of lieutenant colonel on 5 November 1812. In 1816 his uncle Sir George Hill, 2nd Baronet, appointed Blacker to the Commission of the Treasury of Ireland. He was confirmed Lord Dublin and was the great-grandfather of Sir Cecil Blacker, Commandant of Horse.

In 1829, he inherited the family estate upon his father's death. He resigned his military office shortly after and retired to Carrickblacker House. Blacker was buried in Portadown in the Old Seagoe Cemetery.

=== Writings ===
Both William Blacker and his relative Valentine Blacker were lieutenant colonels and published authors. Because some works were published pseudonymously, the two are sometimes confused or conflated in texts. In The Dublin University Magazine, where his work often appeared, they wrote, "We know not why Colonel Blacker has chosen not to own himself the author of some papers which in the pages of our own Magazine have excited attention of which any man might feel proud."

Blacker authored a popular poem on military service, Oliver's Advice, originally published in 1834 under his occasional pseudonym, "Fitz Stewart." The poem was widely anthologized. The poem popularized a phrase attributed to Oliver Cromwell as part of a "well-authenticated anecdote." Each stanza ends with a variant of the line, "put your trust in God, my boys, and keep your powder dry." The line appeared in Bartlett's Familiar Quotations attributed to Colonel Blacker.

His 1818 song "The Crimson Banner" commemorates the Siege of Derry during the Williamite War in Ireland.
