= Valentine Blacker =

British East India Company officer (1778–1826)

Valentine Blacker CB
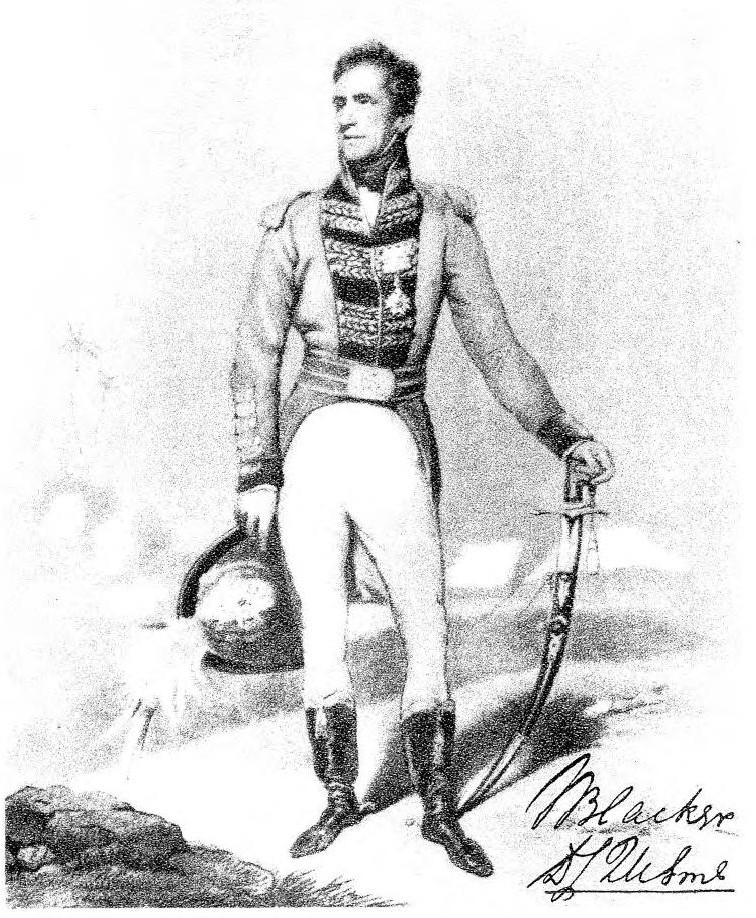
- Born: 19 October 1778; Armagh, Kingdom of Ireland
- Died: 4 February 1826 (aged 47); Calcutta, British India
- Burial place: South Park Street Cemetery, Calcutta
- Military career
- Allegiance: United Kingdom
- Branch: Madras Army, East India Company
- Service years: 1798–1826
- Rank: Lieutenant-colonel
- Unit: 1st Madras Native Cavalry
- Conflicts: Fourth Anglo-Mysore War; Battle of Mallavelly; Polygar Wars (WIA); Second Anglo-Maratha War; Travancore-British War; Battle of Quilon; Anglo-Nepalese War; Third Anglo-Maratha War; Battle of Mahidpur; Battle of Thalner
- Awards: Companion of Most Honourable Military Order of the Bath
- Other work: Surveyor General of India

Lieutenant-Colonel Valentine Blacker CB (19 October 1778 – 4 February 1826) was an officer in the East India Company's Madras Army, and later Surveyor General of India.

== Life and career ==
Blacker was born in Armagh, Northern Ireland where his family has an ancestral home in the barony of Oneilland East. He obtained a commission in the Madras Cavalry in 1798, was made a cornet in 1799, and aide-de-camp to a Colonel Stevenson in the Wayanad district in 1800, and quartermaster-general in 1810. He served in Deccan, 1817, and was promoted to lieutenant colonel. His son, Maxwell, was born in June 1822.

Blacker took over from John Hodgson as Surveyor General of India in 1823. In this capacity he made substantial contributions to the ongoing Trigonometrical Survey of India. He was stationed in Calcutta from 1823 until his death there from a fever in 1826. He was buried in South Park Street Cemetery in Calcutta. Andrew Waugh said that "Blacker, with the exception of Colonel George Everest, was the ablest and most scientific man that ever presided over this expensive department".

=== Writings ===
Blacker and his relative William Blacker were both lieutenant colonels and published authors. Because some of the work was published pseudonymously, the two are sometimes confused or conflated in texts.

His correspondence with his father concerning military and political news, as well as his observations about Indian life and culture, was published in 1798.

Blacker published a history of the Third Anglo-Maratha War, including discussion of the Battle of Khadki, in 1821.
