= George Blacker (antiquary) =

Irish clergyman and antiquary

George Dacre Blacker (1791–1871) was a Church of Ireland clergyman and antiquary.

== Biography ==
Blacker was born in Dublin in 1791, as the elder son of James Blacker, magistrate of Dublin and armiger (i.e. a person entitled to use a heraldic achievement). He entered Trinity College Dublin on 5 October 1806, aged sixteen. In 1809, he was elected a scholar of the college, proceeding to a BA in 1811 and an MA in 1858.

For several years, he was curate of St Andrew's Church, Dublin, chaplain of the Dublin Corporation, and rector of Taghadoe. In 1840, he became prebendary in St Patrick's Cathedral and the vicar of Maynooth. Blacker wrote three works on local history, all printed for private circulation: Castle of Maynooth (1853; 2nd ed., 1860), Castle of Kilkea (1860), and A Record of Maynooth Church (1867). He also wrote Types and Prophecies Relating to Messiah (1829).

Blacker died on 23 May 1871 at his home (in The Glebe, Maynooth), unmarried. He was buried four days later in the Leinster mausoleum, at the expense of the local parish. He left less than £3000 in his will.
