= George Blacker (obstetrician) =

Irish-born British obstetrician

Sir George Francis Blacker CBE FRCP FRCS (23 October 1865 – 21 May 1948) was an Irish-born British obstetrician.

Blacker was born in Dublin, the son of Commissary-General Latham William Blacker and Harriette Demaine Blacker (née Smith). He was educated at Cheltenham College and University College, London. He qualified as a doctor in 1890 and in 1891 won the gold medal in the University of London MBBS examination. Two years later he also won the gold medal in the MD examination. He became an obstetrician at University College Hospital. He also lectured on obstetrics and served as dean of the Medical School for several years. He was president of the Radium Institute and was elected a Fellow of the Royal College of Surgeons of England (FRCS) in 1902.

Blacker was commissioned into the Royal Army Medical Corps in 1915 and served in Egypt until 1916, when he resigned his commission. He was appointed Commander of the Order of the British Empire (CBE) in January 1920 for his war work and was knighted in the 1923 Birthday Honours.
